= Pike29 Memorial Track =

Hiking track in New Zealand

- Track construction in June 2018
- Length: 11.6 km (7.2 mi)
- Location: Paparoa National Park, New Zealand
- Established: February 2024
- Designation: Great Walk (as part of the Paparoa Track)
- Trailheads: Moonlight Tops, Pike River Mine
- Use: Tramping, Trail running
- Surface: dirt, rock
- Website: Department of Conservation

The Pike29 Memorial Track is a hiking track located near the Paparoa National Park in the Grey District of the South Island of New Zealand. The track was created as a memorial for the 29 miners who lost lives in the Pike River Mine disaster. The track is a branch of the Paparoa Track, the tenth Great Walk created. Both tracks were originally scheduled to open in 2018. The Pike29 Memorial Track opened in February 2024, four years after the Paparoa Track. The Pike River Mine portal features a memorial and interpretation centre.

== Track history ==
Acting Conservation Minister, Nick Smith, announces track construction contractors on 19 July 2017 in Blackball (Note: At 0:10 minutes, the video shows that the announcement happened on 17 August 2019 but this is wrong; the minister was in Blackball on 19 July 2017 to announce the construction partners)

In November 2010, a methane explosion at the Pike River Mine killed 29 men and entombed them. Family members of the men then worked with government and asked for a visitor centre to be built, and a new track built to Great Walks standard be constructed that linked the Pike River Mine site on the eastern side of the Paparoa Range with Punakaiki on the West Coast. This was to serve as a memorial but also as a source of income from tourism, compensating for the loss of income to the region of the mine. In his role as acting (Note: Smith stood in for Conservation Minister Maggie Barry on all matters relating to the Pike River Mine as Barry is a cousin of Bernie Monk who acts as spokesperson for some of the family groups) Conservation Minister, Nick Smith and family representatives announced on 29 January 2015 that the track would be built and that the land around the mine would be added to the existing Paparoa National Park. The Department of Conservation had been tasked with a feasibility study and prior to that work having been completed, it was estimated that a 20 km (12 mi) track would be built. Some families regard the area as sacred and maintain that people should not cycle or walk across the mine site; they were opposed to the track construction. Smith confirmed the track on 15 November 2015, confirmed that it would go from Blackball to Punakaiki, and that 45 km (28 mi) of new track would be built. It would connect existing tracks—the Croesus Track and the Pororari River Track—and a side track would be built to the Pike River Mine site. At the mine, a visitor centre and a memorial were to be built. It was confirmed that the main track could also be used for year-round mountain biking, which is unusual for National Parks (Note: No other purpose-built tracks in National Parks are available for year-round mountain biking, but summer restrictions apply elsewhere. Mountain biking is unrestricted in National Parks only on old tracks that are legal road, for example the Rameka Track in Abel Tasman National Park.) but was favoured by the family group to maximise the tourism potential for the West Coast. It was announced that 3,971 ha (9,810 acres) would be added to the national park. The side track to the Pike River Mine—named Pike29 Memorial Track—was to be 11.6 km (7.2 mi) long and at the time, it was expected for the tracks to open at the end of 2018. Two 20-bunk huts on the Paparoa Track were part of the proposal. The arrangements were formalised in March 2017 through amending the Paparoa National Park Management Plan as construction activity in a National Park is otherwise not permitted. Track construction was to start later that autumn and the huts were to be started the following summer, with a construction budget of NZ$10m. The name of Paparoa Track was chosen by the family group of the deceased miners.

It was not until July 2017 (i.e. winter) that construction did start, as announced by Smith in mid-July 2017. The projected track opening had shifted to April 2019 by then. Three different companies were tasked with building sections of the overall project, with Nelmac Limited assigned to one section of the Paparoa Track (from the bushline above the Moonlight Tops Hut to the junction with the Pike29 Memorial Track) and the Pike29 Memorial Track.

Conservation Minister Eugenie Sage officially opening the Paparoa Track

After the change to Labour Government later in 2017, part of the tourism support package announced in December 2017 by the Minister of Tourism, Kelvin Davis, went to Blackball in support of the tracks under construction.

The Paparoa Track was officially opened on 1 December 2019 and after a major slip had been repaired, the track was fully open on 1 March 2020. However, some time after the Pike River Recovery Agency was established, the contractor was removed from the Pike29 Memorial Track. The contractor returned in February 2022. The track officially opened in February 2024.

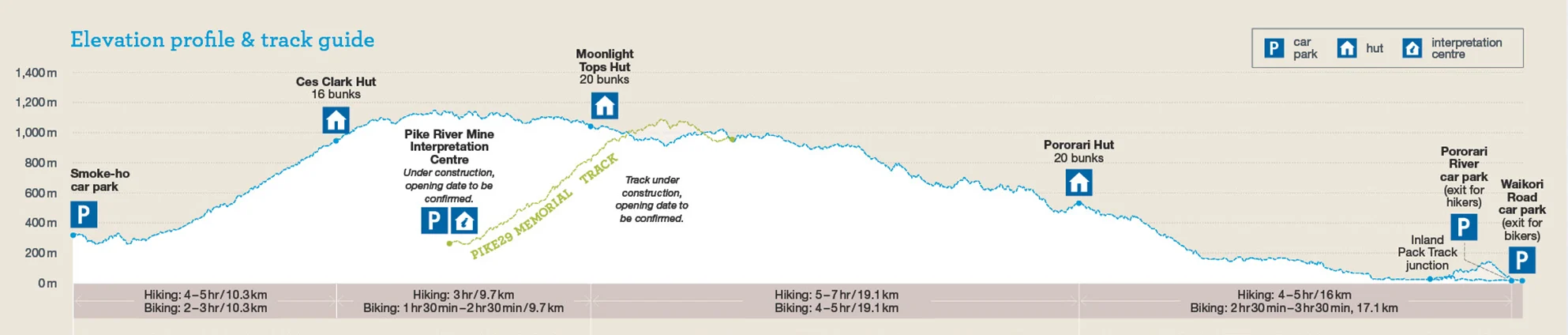
Paparoa and Pike29 Memorial tracks elevation profiles
