= Paparoa Track =

Hiking and mountain biking track in New Zealand

Coordinates: 42.2138°S 171.4383°E

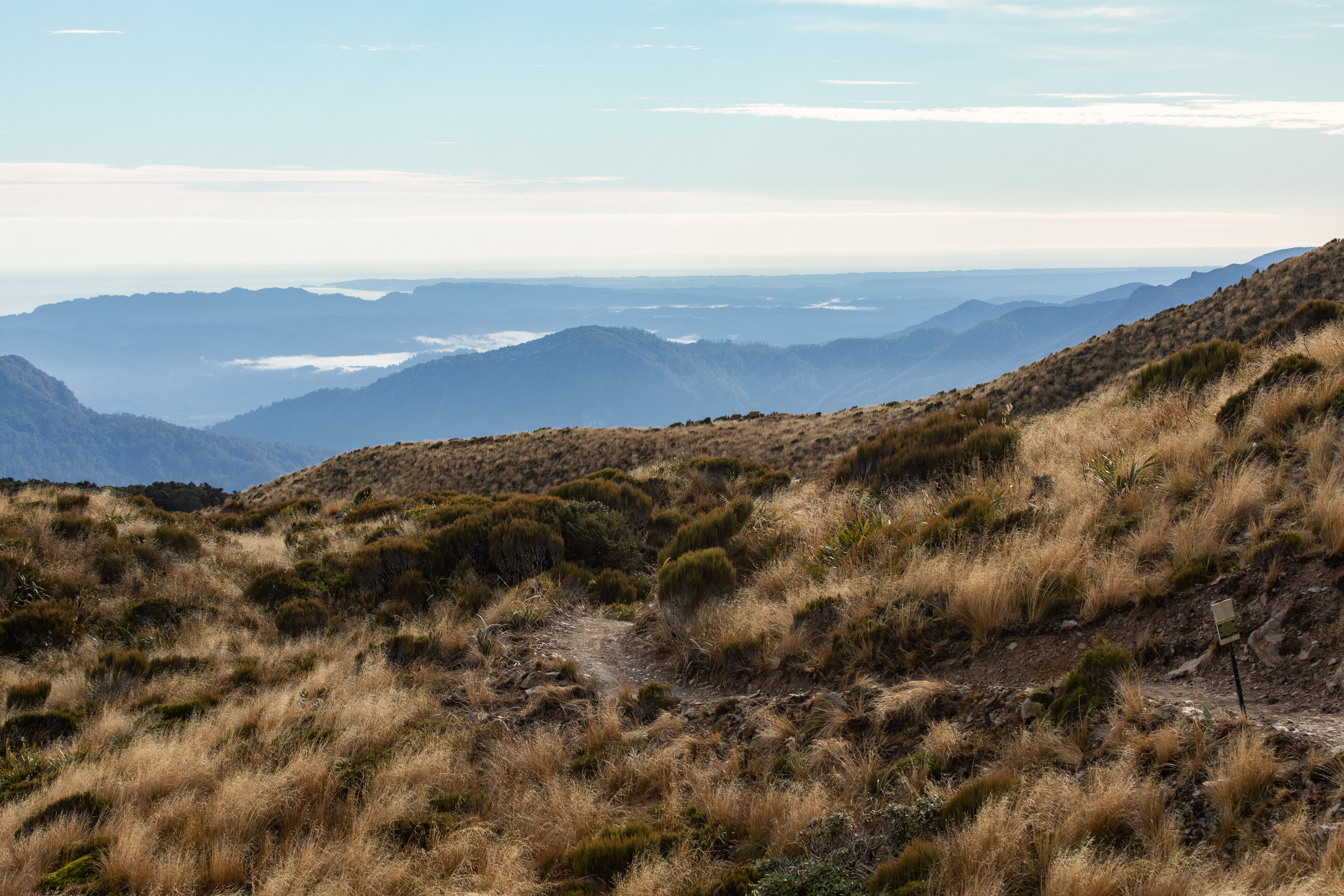
- Moonlight Tops on the Paparoa Track
- Length: 55.7 km (34.6 mi)
- Location: Paparoa National Park, New Zealand
- Designation: Great Walk
- Trailheads: Blackball, Punakaiki
- Use: Tramping, Trail running, Mountain biking
- Difficulty: medium
- Season: Summer to autumn
- Months: Late October to late April. Possible to walk in winter months too, but for experienced hikers only
- Sights: Sunsets, limestone cliffs, beech forests
- Hazards: Extremely cold temperatures, rain, wind, snow, flooding, steep slopes
- Surface: dirt, rock
- Website: Department of Conservation

The Paparoa Track is a 55.7 km (34.6 mi) shared hiking and mountain biking track in Paparoa National Park on the South Island of New Zealand. The track was created as a memorial for the 29 miners who lost their lives in the Pike River Mine disaster. The track is the tenth Great Walk to be created and has been fully open since 1 March 2020. It was the first addition to the Great Walks in 25 years.

== Gold mining history ==
From around 1864, there was a gold rush in the Paparoa foothills, leading to the establishment of the town of Blackball. The gold was found in quartz reefs, requiring ore-crushing machinery for extraction. Following the discovery of a reef high in the mountains above Blackball, the Croesus Gold Mining Company was formed in 1896, to attract the investment necessary to pay for the machinery and the development of a mine. In 1901, the Garden Gully Company took over the operation and in 1904 they moved a large stamper battery into the range. Insufficient gold was recovered to make the operation viable, and the company was dissolved two years later.

One of the legacies of this early gold mining activity is the Croesus Track, which crosses the Paparoa Range from Blackball in the Grey Valley to Barrytown on the Tasman Sea Coast. The Croesus Track fell into disuse after mining ceased, but in the 1970s, a team led by Ces Clark, a Blackball resident and Forest Service ranger, set about re-opening the track. The first section of the Paparoa Track, starting from the Blackball end, follows the Croesus Track to top of the Paparoa Range. A new hut on the bush edge is named in honour of Ces Clark.

== Track history ==
Acting Conservation Minister, Nick Smith, announces track construction contractors on 19 July 2017 in Blackball (Note: At 0:10 minutes, the video shows that the announcement happened on 17 August 2019 but this is wrong; the minister was in Blackball on 19 July 2017 to announce the construction partners)

In November 2010, a methane explosion at the Pike River Mine killed 29 men and entombed them. Family members of the men then worked with government and asked for a visitor centre to be built, and a new track built to Great Walks standard be constructed that linked the Pike River Mine site on the eastern side of the Paparoa Range with Punakaiki on the West Coast. This was to serve as a memorial but also as a source of income from tourism, compensating for the loss of income to the region of the mine. In his role as acting (Note: Smith stood in for Conservation Minister Maggie Barry on all matters relating to the Pike River Mine as Barry is a cousin of Bernie Monk who acts as spokesperson for some of the family groups) Conservation Minister, Nick Smith and family representatives announced on 29 January 2015 that the track would be built and that the land around the mine would be added to the existing Paparoa National Park. The Department of Conservation had been tasked with a feasibility study and prior to that work having been completed, it was estimated that a 20 km (12 mi) track would be built. Some families regard the area as sacred and maintain that people should not cycle or walk across the mine site; they were opposed to the track construction. Smith confirmed the track on 15 November 2015, confirmed that it would go from Blackball to Punakaiki, and that 45 km (28 mi) of new track would be built. It would connect existing tracks—the Croesus Track and the Pororari River Track—and a side track would be built to the Pike River Mine site. At the mine, a visitor centre and a memorial were to be built. It was confirmed that the main track could also be used for year-round mountain biking, which is unusual for National Parks (Note: No other purpose-built tracks in National Parks are available for year-round mountain biking, but summer restrictions apply elsewhere. Mountain biking is unrestricted in National Parks only on old tracks that are legal road, for example the Rameka Track in Abel Tasman National Park.) but was favoured by the family group to maximise the tourism potential for the West Coast. It was announced that 3,971 ha (9,810 acres) would be added to the national park. The side track to the Pike River Mine—named Pike29 Memorial Track—was to be 9 km (5.6 mi) long and at the time, it was expected for the tracks to open at the end of 2018. Two 20-bunk huts—Moonlight Tops Hut and Pororari River Hut—were part of the proposal. The arrangements were formalised in March 2017 through amending the Paparoa National Park Management Plan as construction activity in a National Park is otherwise not permitted. Track construction was to start later that autumn and the huts were to be started the following summer, with a construction budget of NZ$10m. The name of Paparoa Track was chosen by the family group of the deceased miners.

It was not until July 2017 (i.e. winter) that construction did start, as announced by Smith in mid-July 2017. The projected track opening had shifted to April 2019 by then. From the existing Croesus Track to the Moonlight Tops Hut and beyond to the bush line near Mount Anderson, a team from the Department of Conservation built the track. Nelmac Limited built the next section from here up to the junction with the Pike29 Memorial Track, and was also given the contract to build the Pike29 Memorial Track. Westport-based and Buller District Council-owned Westreef Services built the track from the junction with the Pike29 Memorial Track to the Inland Pack Track where it connects to the existing Pororari River Track. Punakaiki residents raised concerns that the settlement is already struggling with high tourist numbers (at the time, the 100 permanent residents received 450,000 visitors per year) and that another major attraction would add to the pressure. Suspension bridges were built across all major waterways. The surveying work needed to identify a suitable route meeting the 6.5 degree slope limit for mountain biking took 72 trips over 8 months.

Conservation Minister Eugenie Sage officially opening the Paparoa Track

After the change to Labour Government later in 2017, part of the tourism support package announced in December 2017 by the Minister of Tourism, Kelvin Davis, went to Blackball in support of the tracks under construction. In September 2018, DOC announced that the track opening was delayed until September 2019.

In November 2018, the government invested NZ$3.5m from its Regional Economic Development Fund on an upgrade of the road from Blackball to the start of the Croesus Track, which is also used by the Paparoa Track. The official opening of the track was delayed until 1 December 2019 and cost had risen to NZ$12m, with the official opening event the previous day in Blackball officiated by Eugenie Sage as the Minister of Conservation. However, a slip that had occurred two weeks prior made the middle section of the track between the two new huts impassable, hence usage was only possible from either end. When Westreef Services tried to repair the slip, another slip occurred and took with it their digger but it was able to be recovered. It was not until 1 March 2020 before the track was open for its full length.

The Paparoa Track was the first new Great Walk added in decades. The last Great Walk that had been added was the Kepler Track in Fiordland which opened in February 1988.

== Route ==
A video by DOC about the track (1:31 min)

=== Smoke-ho car park to Ces Clark Hut ===
The first 10.3 kilometres (6.4 mi) section of the track from the southern end begins at the Smoke-ho car park around 4 km north of Blackball. The route follows Blackball Creek along the historic Croesus Track, used by gold miners to access mining sites high in the Paparoa Range. The current track passes some historic remnants of mining, and retains some of the original stonework. The Ces Clark hut is on the bushline at an elevation of 940 m (3,080 ft). From near the top of the climb, there is a side track to Garden Gully hut and the remains of a quartz stamping battery.

=== Ces Clark Hut to Moonlight Tops Hut ===
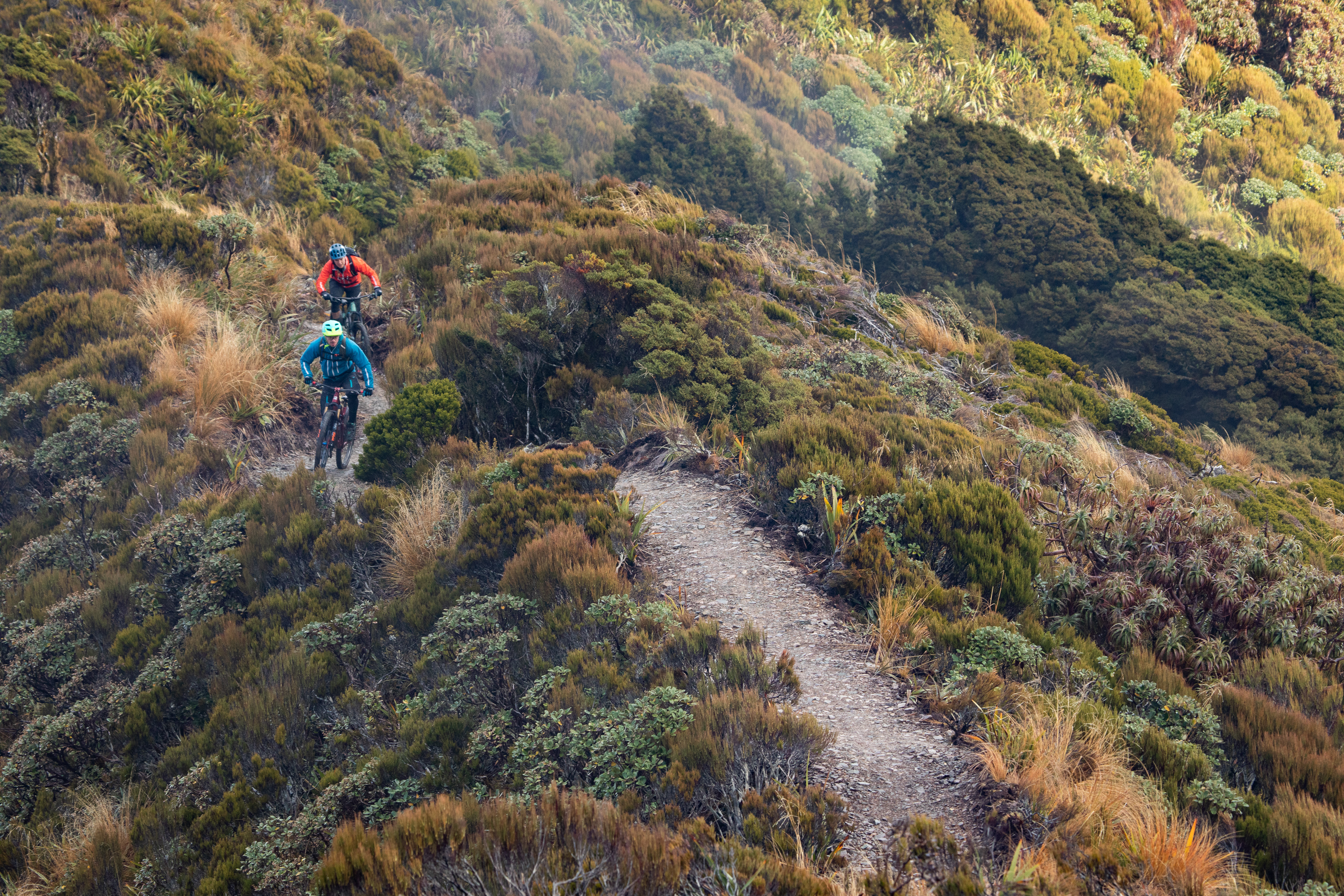
Mountain bikers on Moonlight Tops

The next 9.7 kilometres (6.0 mi) section of the trail climbs through tussock and alpine scrub to the main ridgelines of the Paparoa Range, heading north and then north-west along ridgelines to the Moonlight Tops hut at over 1,000 m elevation. This hut is a popular over-night stay with mountain bikers, and is the mostly heavily booked hut on the track.

=== Moonlight Tops Hut to Pororari Hut ===
The 19.1 kilometres (11.9 mi) descent from the high ridgelines of the Paparoa ranges begins by traversing 2 km along the top of a large sandstone escarpment with steep cliffs, above the headwaters of the Punakaiki River. From a point below Mt Hawera, the track turns north-west and descends ridges above Tindale Creek to reach Pororari Hut.

=== Pororari Hut to Punakaiki ===
The final 16 kilometres (9.9 mi) of the track follows a route along the Pororari River to a junction where the Inland Pack Track turns left. This is the exit route for mountain bikers, and the trail traverses a saddle between the Pororari and Punakaiki River to finish at a suspension bridge across the Punakaiki River, at the end of Waipori Road leading to State Highway 6. Walkers completing the Paparoa Track walk down the Pororari River track from the junction, passing through the river gorge with its limestone escarpments and dense forest. The walking track finishes at State Highway 6 at Punakaiki.

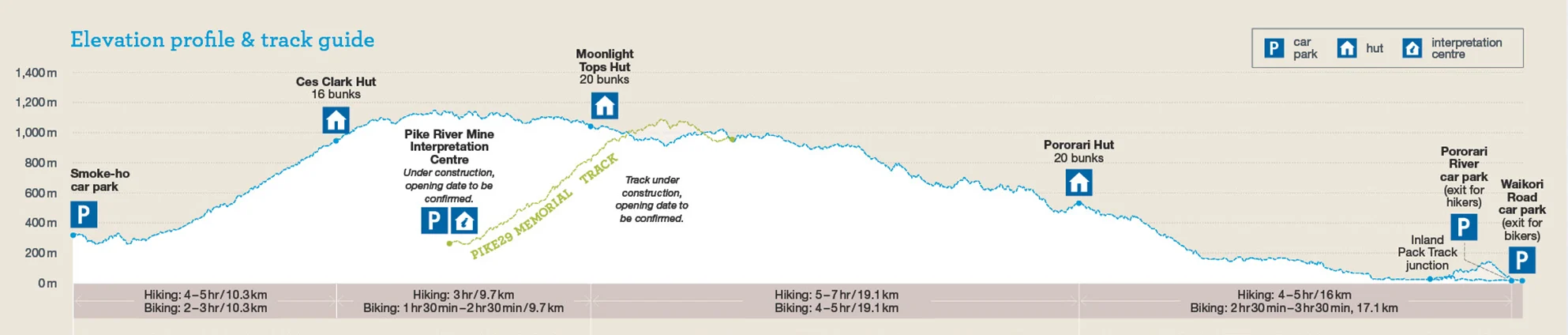
Paparoa and Pike29 Memorial tracks elevation profiles

Paparoa Track impressions

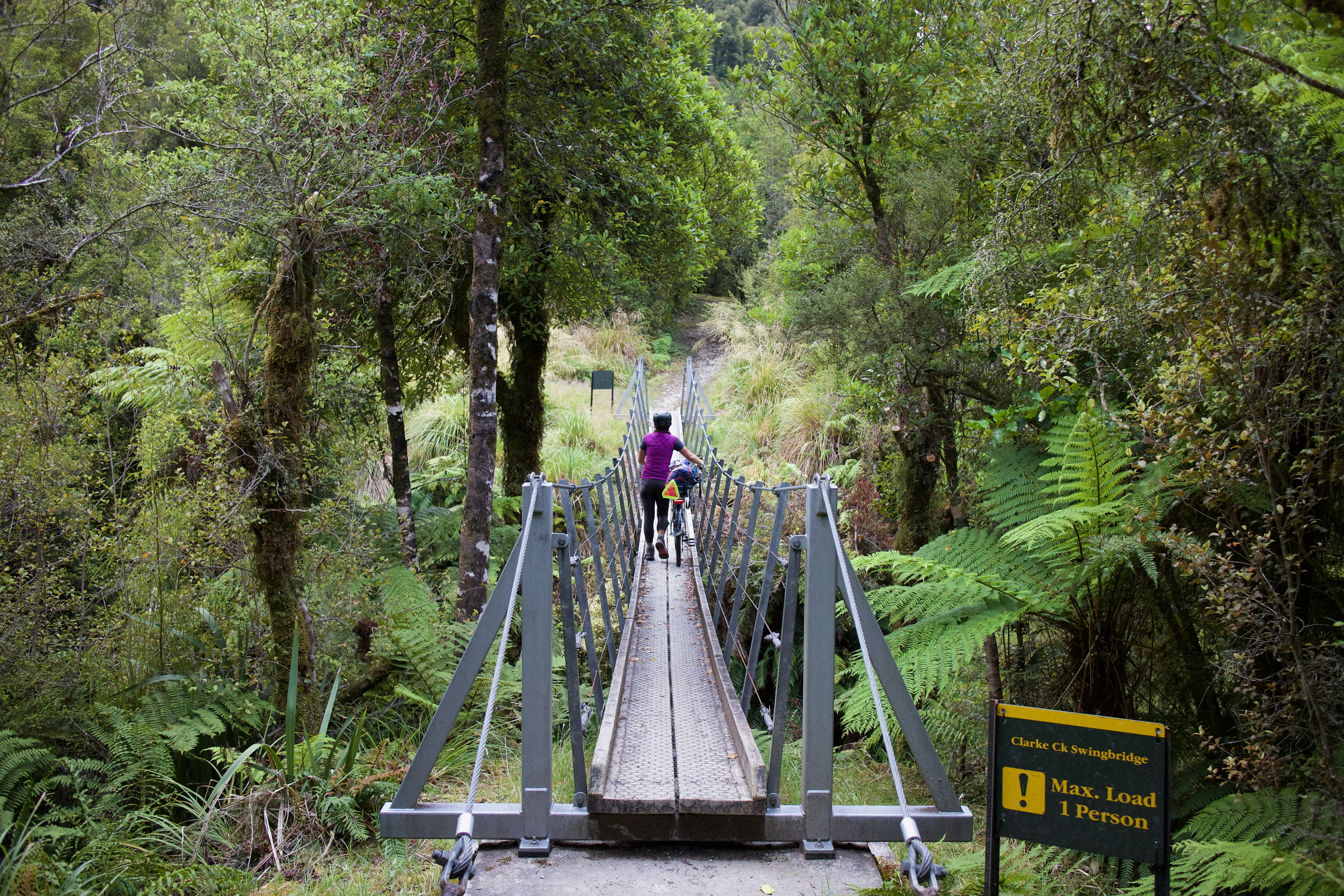
Bridge over Clarke Creek on the Croesus Track

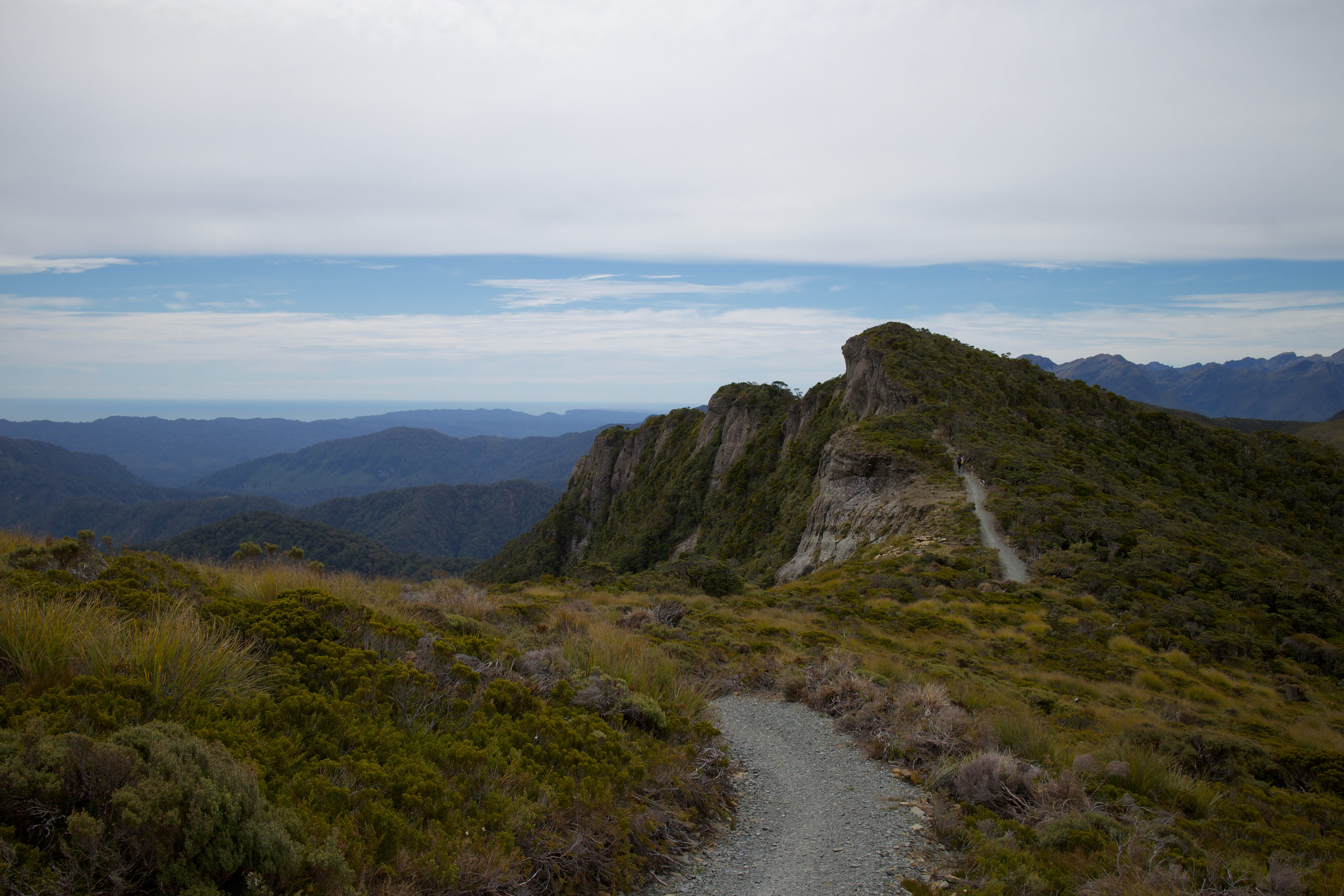
Ridgeline view

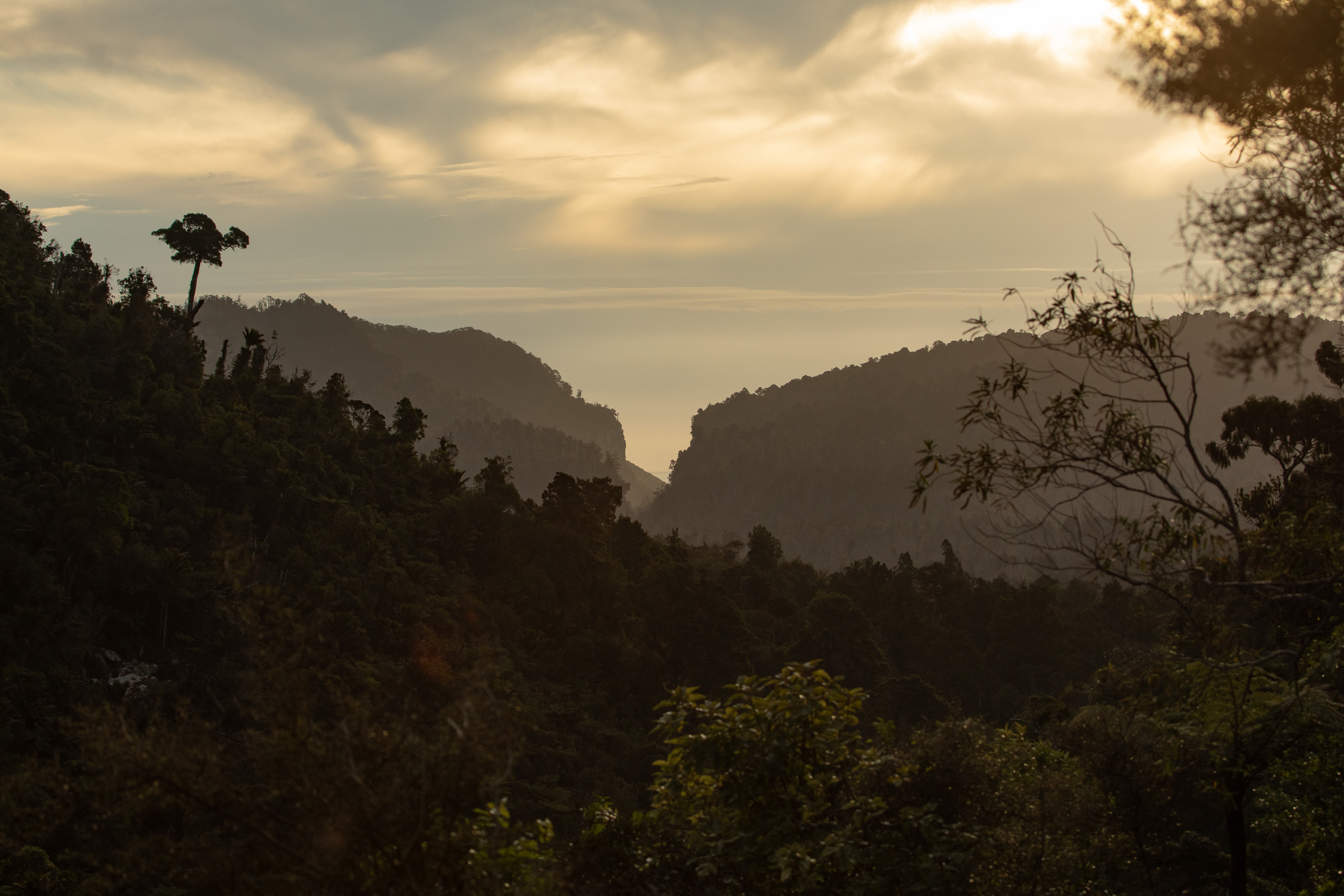
Pororari gorge

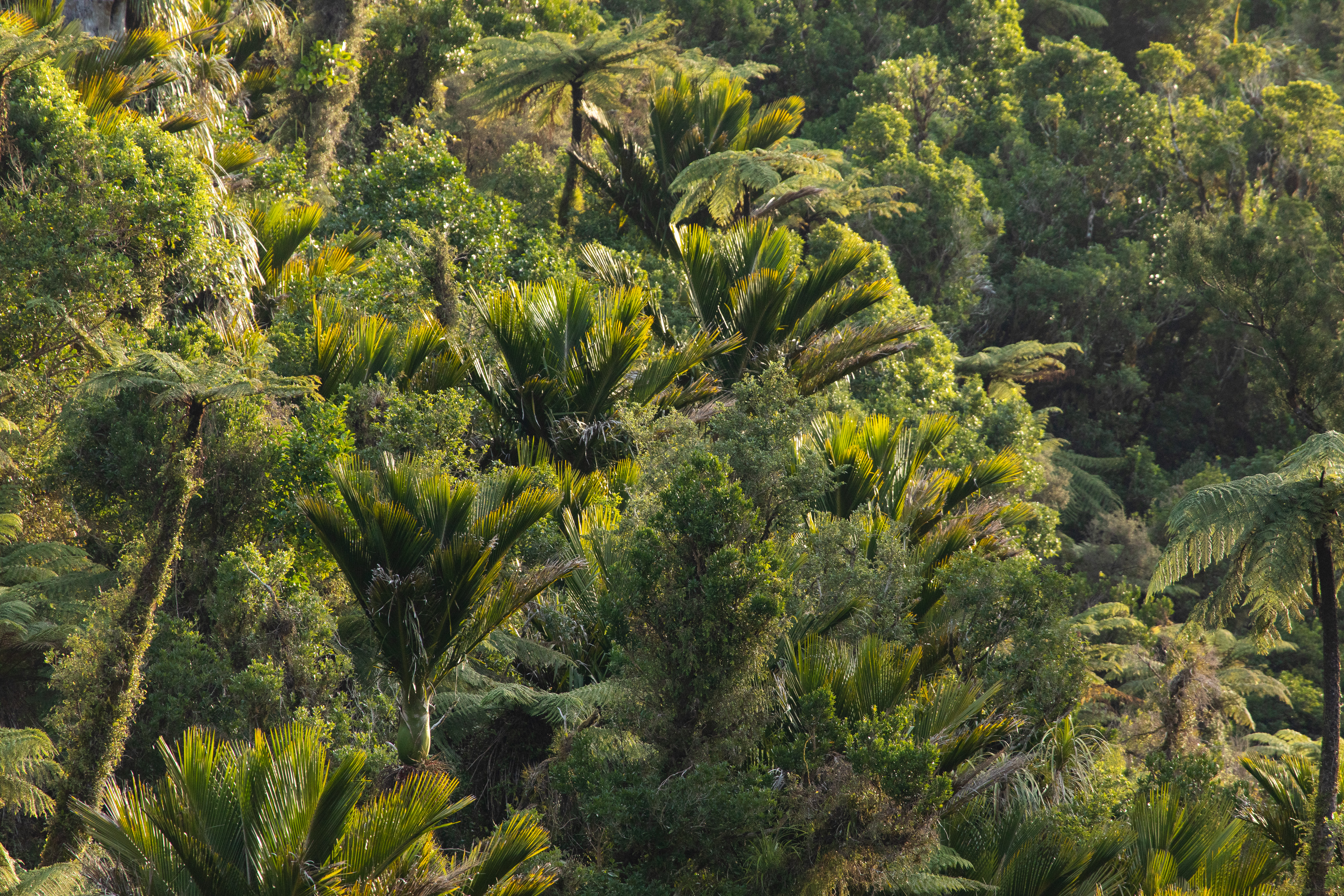
Dense forest of nikau and ferns
Paparoa Track huts

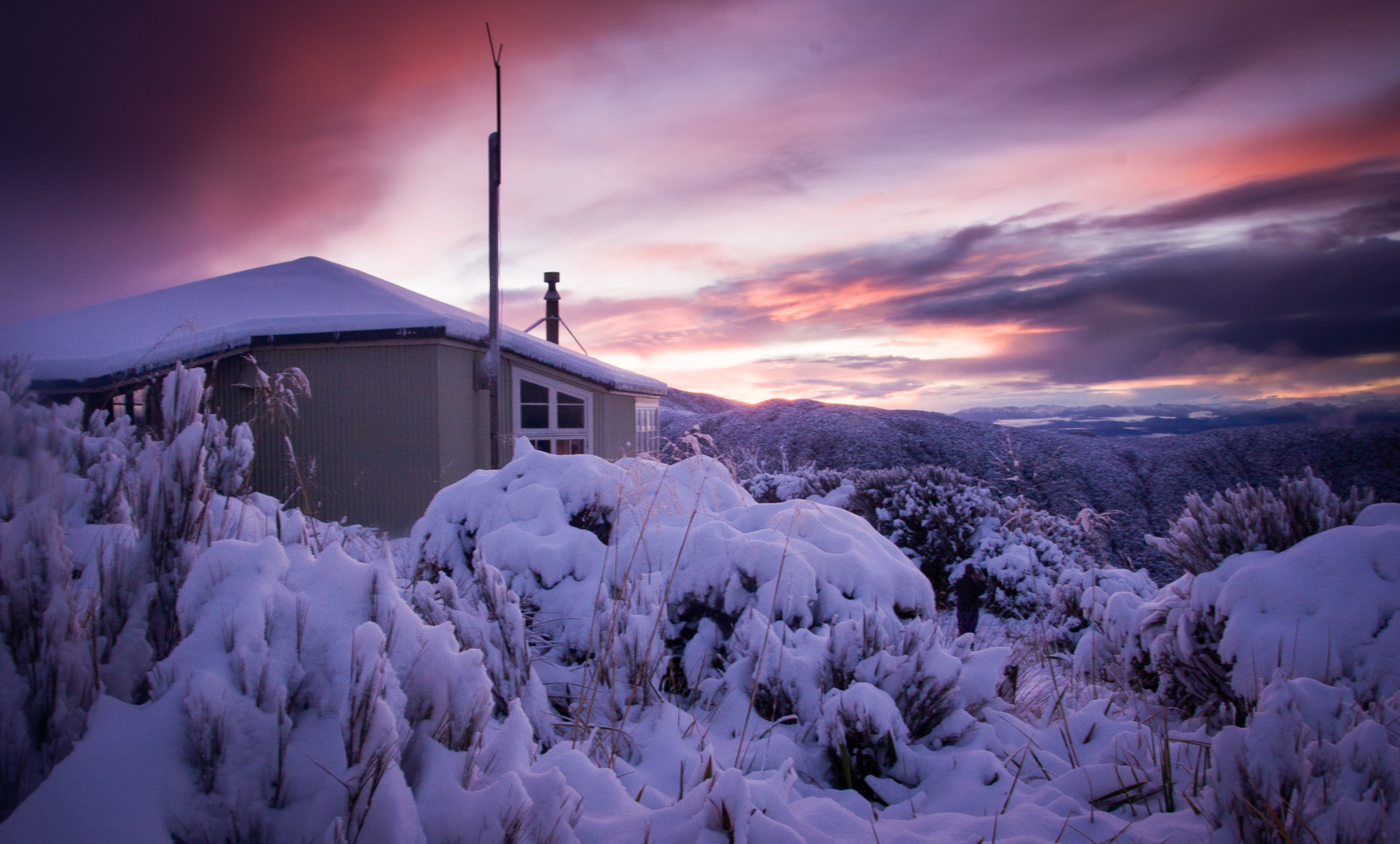
Ces Clark Hut

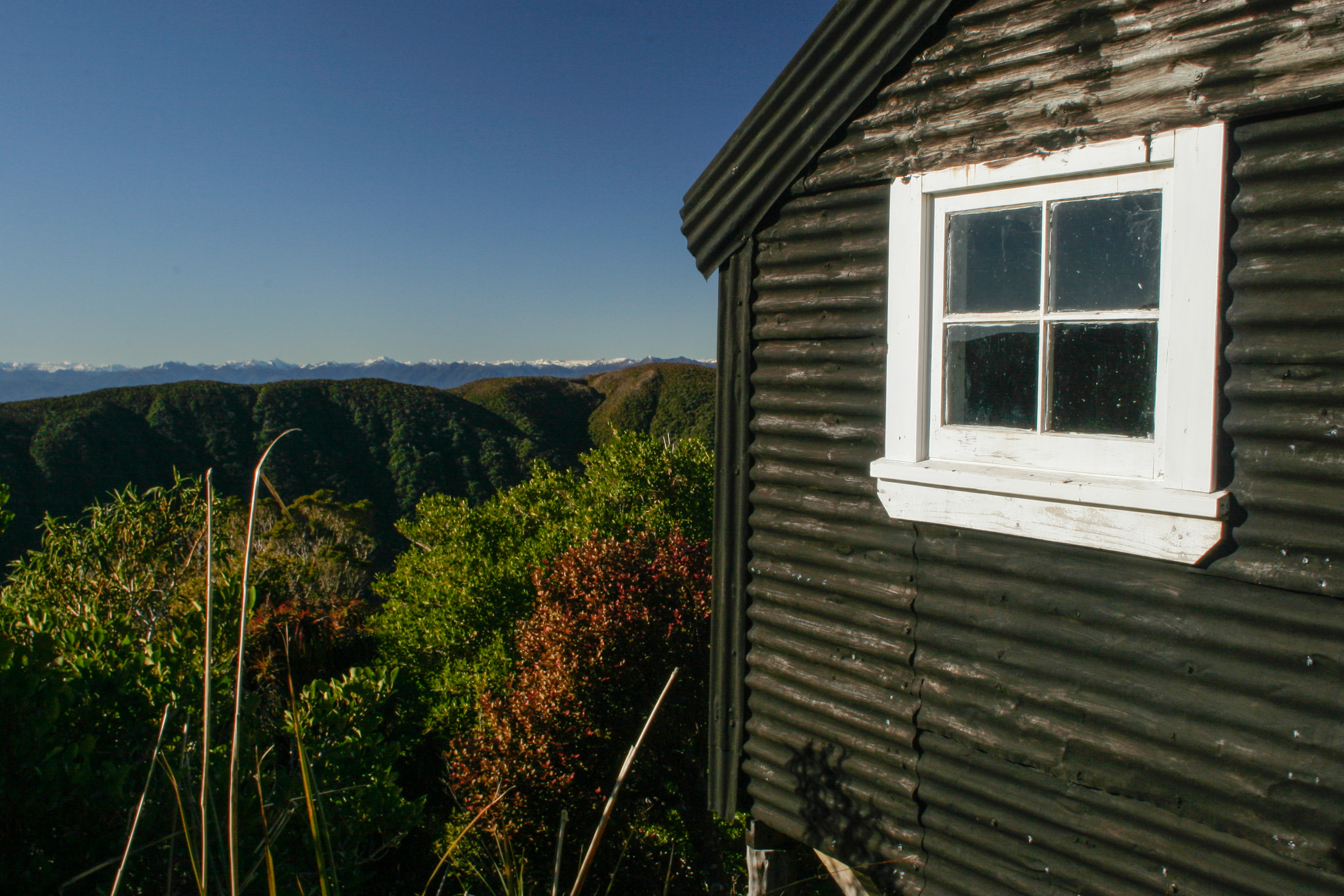
Croesus Top Hut, a historic hut not open to the public

Construction of Moonlight Hut (video 3:10 min)

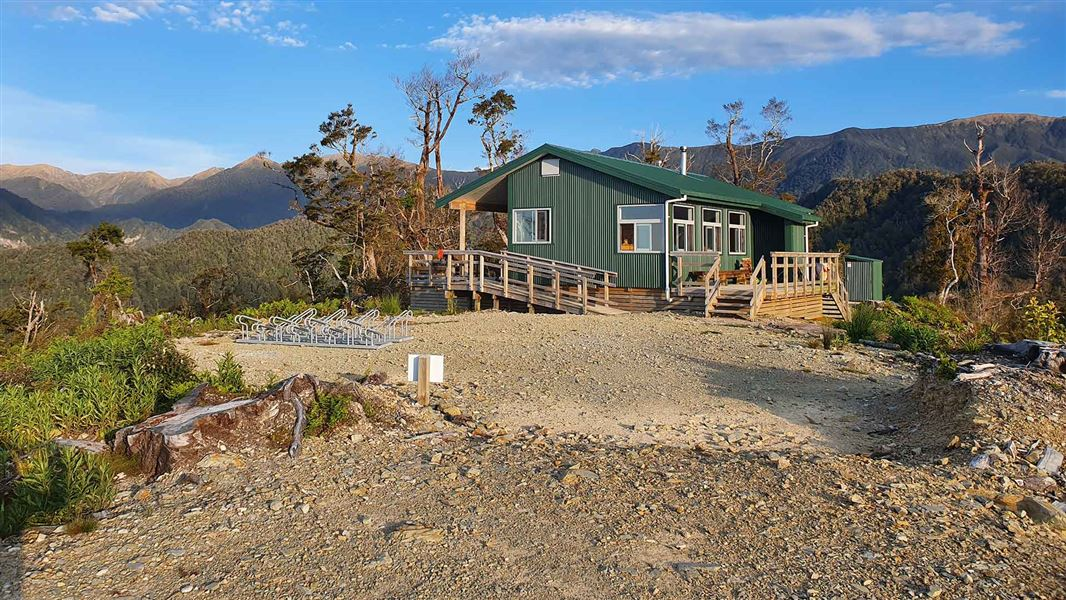
Pororari Hut

== Pike29 Memorial Track ==
The Pike29 Memorial Track is an additional 10.8 km (6.7 mi) side track that leads down from the Paparoa Track to the Pike River Mine Portal. The track opened in February 2024. At the mine there is a memorial and interpretation centre.
