= Croesus Track =

Historic miners trail in Paparoa National Park, New Zealand

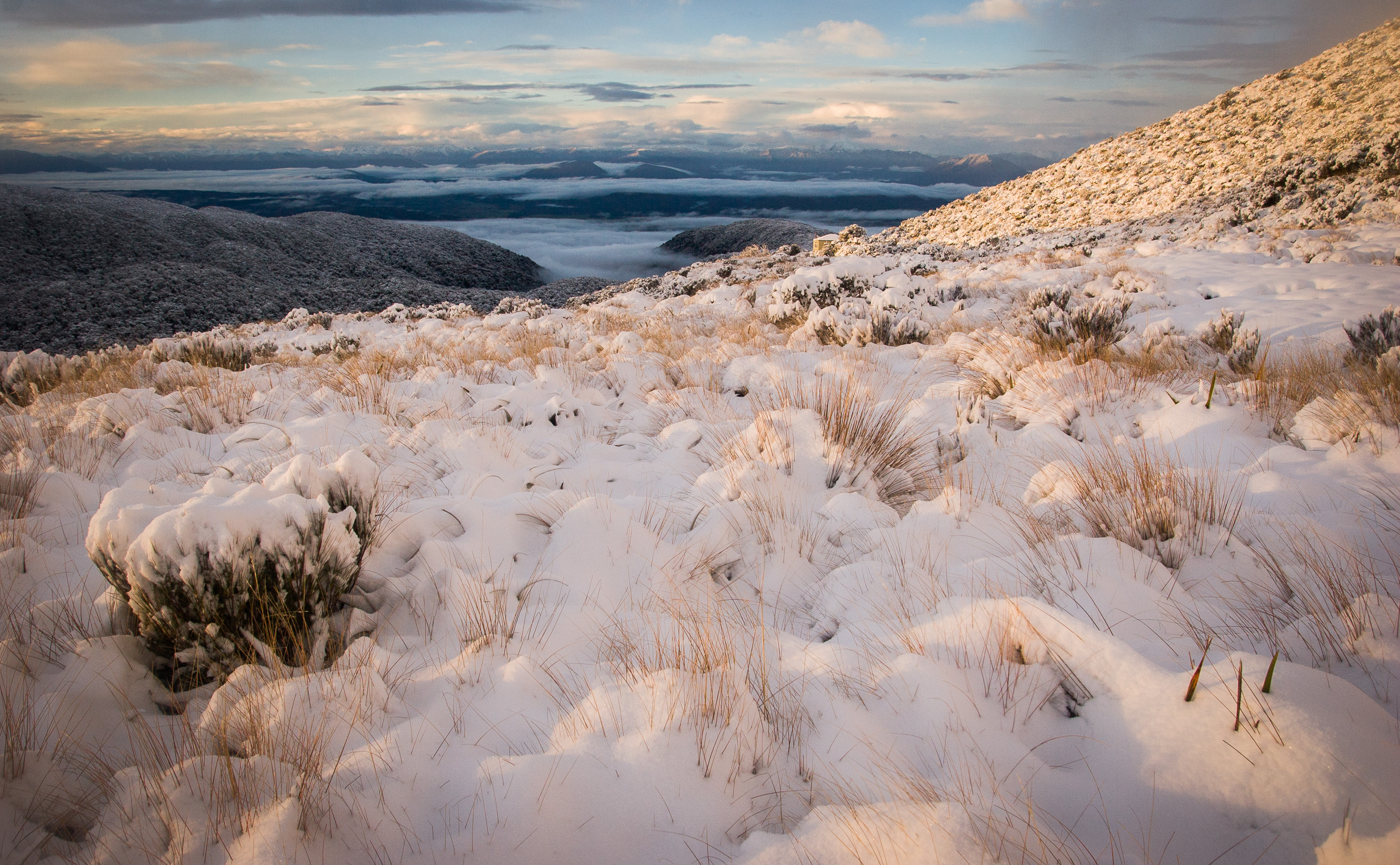
- View from Ces Clark hut on the Croesus Track
- Length: 22.1 km (13.7 mi)
- Location: Paparoa National Park, New Zealand
- Trailheads: Blackball, Barrytown
- Use: Tramping, Trail running
- Difficulty: medium
- Season: Summer to autumn
- Months: Late October to late April. Possible to walk in winter months too, but for experienced hikers only
- Sights: Sunsets, limestone cliffs, beech forests
- Hazards: Extremely cold temperatures, rain, wind, snow, flooding, steep slopes.
- Surface: dirt, rock

The Croesus Track is a 22.1 km (13.7 mi) historic miners trail to the south of Paparoa National Park in the Grey District of South Island of New Zealand. The route crosses the Paparoa Range from Blackball in the Grey Valley to Barrytown on the Tasman Sea coast. The first section, starting from the Blackball end, is shared with the Paparoa Track which follows the route of the Croesus Track to top of the Paparoa Range. This section is shared-use between hiking and mountain biking.

== History ==
From around 1864, there was a gold rush in the Paparoa foothills, leading to the establishment of the town of Blackball. Miners first developed a rough track up Blackball Creek to access prospecting sites. This track was gradually improved into the pack track now known as the Croesus Track between 1881 and 1899, and reached the Paparoa tops.

The gold was found in quartz reefs, requiring ore-crushing machinery for extraction. Following the discovery of a reef high in the mountains above Blackball, the Croesus Gold Mining Company was formed in 1896, to attract the investment necessary to pay for the machinery and the development of a mine. In 1901, the Garden Gully Company took over the operation and in 1904 they moved a large stamper battery into the range. Insufficient gold was recovered to make the operation viable, and the company was dissolved two years later.

The Croesus Track fell into disuse after mining ceased, but in the 1970s, a team led by Ces Clark, a Blackball resident and Forest Service ranger set about re-opening the track. A new hut on the bush edge is named in honour of Ces Clark.

The first section of the Paparoa Track, starting from the Blackball end, follows the Croesus Track to top of the Paparoa Range.
