= Four Mile River =

Four Mile or Tiropahi River
- Route of the Four Mile or Tiropahi River
- Mouth of the Four Mile or Tiropahi River Four Mile River (New Zealand)
- Native name: Tiropahi (Māori)

Location
- Country: New Zealand
- Region: West Coast
- District: Buller

Physical characteristics
- Source: Paparoa Range
  - coordinates: 42°03′13″S 171°31′34″E
- Mouth: Tasman Sea
  - location: =
  - coordinates: 41°57′21″S 171°24′43″E

Basin features
- Progression: Four Mile River → Tasman Sea
- Tributaries
  - left: Waggon Creek, Doubtful Creek

The Four Mile River, also called the Tiropahi River, is a river in the Buller District of New Zealand. It arises in the Paparoa Range and flows north-west skirting the northern boundary of the Paparoa National Park to the Tasman Sea at Needle Point.
