= Blackball Museum of Working Class History =

Museum in Blackball, New Zealand

Mahi Tupuna – Blackball Museum of Working Class History
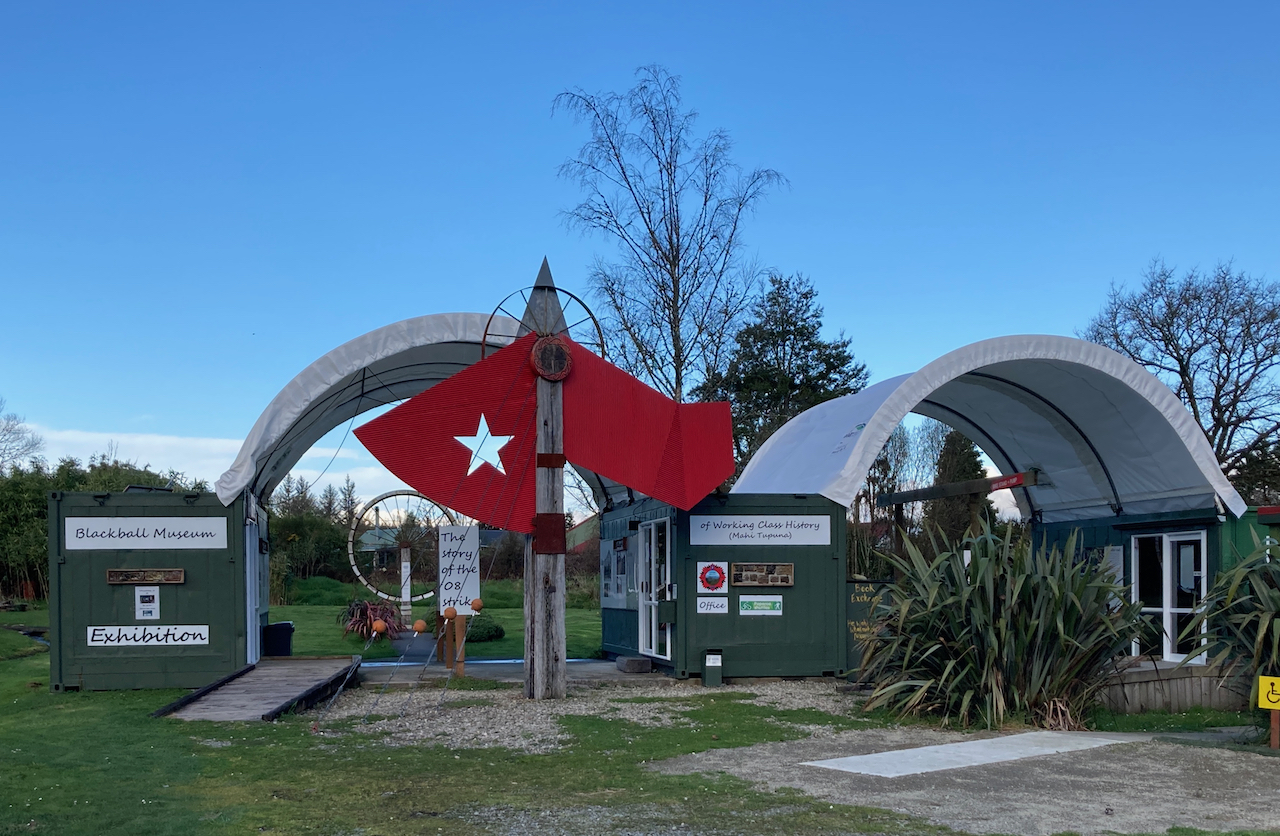
- Established: 1 May 2010
- Location: 26 Hart Street; Blackball, New Zealand
- Coordinates: 42°21′51.6″S 171°24′47.5″E
- Type: Social history
- Website: www.blackballmuseum.org.nz

Blackball Museum of Working Class History (Mahi Tupuna) is a museum in Blackball, a small town on the West Coast of New Zealand, that opened in May 2010. The collection celebrates the role of working people in creating the nation and its wealth.

== History ==
The Blackball Museum of Working Class History Charitable Trust received funding in 2002 from the New Zealand Lottery Grants Board, the Blackball Residents' Association and the West Coast Development Trust to investigate the feasibility of a museum. The feasibility study was launched in 2003. While the project was under development, the trust engaged in historical work such as recording oral histories of local residents. In February 2010, the museum sponsored a memorial to the 1908 coal miners' strike. The museum opened on May Day (International Workers' Day; 1 May) 2010.

== Collection ==
The museum's exhibits describe the 1908 miners' strike, which led to the formation of a federation of miners, which became the Federation of Labour in 1909. There is a permanent exhibition on Blackball’s coal mining history and a changing exhibition on an issue related to the area, or on a political issue. The museum also includes a memorial wheel dedicated to those who have died at work in New Zealand, with a special section for the 29 miners who died in the Pike River Mine disaster of 19 November 2010. The memorial is the site of an annual ceremony to commemorate the disaster. The museum also hosts an annual Mayday Ceremony and forum.
