= Kiri Allan =

New Zealand politician (born 1984)

The Honourable Kiri Allan
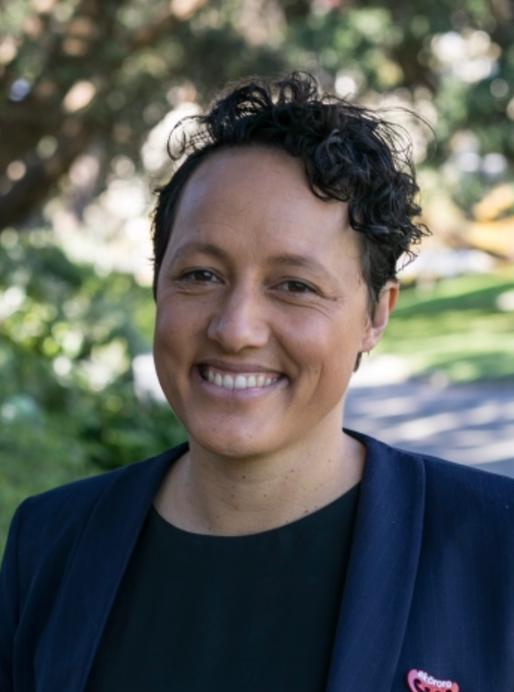
- Allan in 2019

51st Minister of Justice
- In office 14 June 2022 – 24 July 2023
- Prime Minister: Jacinda Ardern; Chris Hipkins
- Preceded by: Kris Faafoi
- Succeeded by: Ginny Andersen

Minister for Regional Development
- In office 1 February 2023 – 24 July 2023
- Prime Minister: Chris Hipkins
- Preceded by: Stuart Nash (as Minister for Economic and Regional Development)
- Succeeded by: Kieran McAnulty

14th Minister of Conservation
- In office 6 November 2020 – 14 June 2022
- Prime Minister: Jacinda Ardern
- Preceded by: Eugenie Sage
- Succeeded by: Poto Williams

27th Minister for Emergency Management
- In office 6 November 2020 – 14 June 2022
- Prime Minister: Jacinda Ardern
- Preceded by: Peeni Henare
- Succeeded by: Kieran McAnulty

Member of the New Zealand Parliament for East Coast
- In office 17 October 2020 – 14 October 2023
- Preceded by: Anne Tolley
- Succeeded by: Dana Kirkpatrick

Member of the New Zealand Parliament for Labour party list
- In office 23 September 2017 – 17 October 2020

Personal details
- Born: Kiritapu Lyndsay Allan; 1984 (age 41–42) Te Karaka, New Zealand
- Party: Labour
- Spouse: Natalie Coates (m. 2016; div. 2022)
- Children: 1
- Profession: Lawyer

Kiritapu Lyndsay Allan (/ˈkɪri ˈælən/, Māori pronunciation: [ˈkiɾiˌtapʉ]; born 1984) is a New Zealand lawyer and former politician. She was a member of Parliament (MP) in the New Zealand House of Representatives from 2017 to 2023, representing the Labour Party in the East Coast electorate.

Allan was a junior minister in the second term of Jacinda Ardern's Sixth Labour Government and a senior minister under Ardern's successor, Chris Hipkins. She held the positions of Minister for Emergency Management and Minister of Conservation from November 2020 to June 2022 and was Minister of Justice from June 2022 until July 2023.

In June 2023, concerns about how Allan treated her staff were raised. She took time off from her parliamentary duties after a relationship breakup and, on 24 July 2023, resigned from her ministerial roles after she was arrested for careless driving the previous night. In May 2024, Allan pleaded guilty and was convicted of two charges of careless driving and failing to accompany a police officer.

== Early life ==
Allan was born in Te Karaka, of Ngāti Ranginui and Ngāti Tūwharetoa descent. She is the ninth of ten children and was named after her grandmother. As a baby, she was whāngai – given to an aunt and uncle, Gail and David Allan, who lived in Paengaroa. She was raised in a Pentecostal Christian community, which she said contributed to her perspective on helping others. Her family were cleaners and agricultural workers who experienced layoffs due to the "Rogernomics" reforms in the 1980s. Some family members had experiences with the criminal justice system and Allan later said that criminal justice reform was a motivator for her to enter both law and politics.

Allan, who is lesbian, struggled with her church's teachings about her sexuality as a teenager and wrote in 2022 about her experiences undergoing conversion therapy. After being outed at 16, she was "ejected from the household for a time" and ultimately left the church when she was 18. She later joined the Rātana church.

Allan moved to Auckland at age 10; her secondary schooling was at Auckland Girls’ Grammar in Kahurangi, the reo Māori unit. She left high school at 16 and started work at a KFC franchise in West Auckland. She also joined the Service & Food Workers Union at that time. At 17, she hitchhiked south and took her next job as a cherry picker in Blenheim.

Returning to Auckland, she began university study at Unitec, studying Māori language and tikanga. The next year, she enrolled at Victoria University of Wellington where she studied law and politics, and joined the Labour Party. She decided on law because of advice from former University of Otago law professor Mark Henaghan, whom Allan befriended while working in a bar, and joined Labour after her politics lecturer Margaret Clark told her that joining a political party would teach her how politics worked.

During her university studies she interned with Prime Minister Helen Clark and later for Māori lawyer Annette Sykes.

== Legal career ==
After finishing her law degree, Allan was a judge's clerk for a period before taking a role at law firm ChenPalmer, where she worked for two years. Later she joined Kāhui Legal, a specialist law firm focussed on issues related to Māori development in Whakatāne before standing as Labour candidate for the East Coast in 2017.

== Member of Parliament ==
New Zealand Parliament
Years	Term	Electorate	List	Party
2017–2020	52nd	List	21	Labour
2020–2023	53rd	East Coast	25	Labour

Allan stood for Labour in the East Coast electorate in the 2017 election and was placed 21 on Labour's party list. The former deputy prime minister, Sir Michael Cullen, and his wife, the former MP Lady Anne Collins were Allan's campaign chairs and political mentors. She came second to Anne Tolley in the election, but entered Parliament via the party list. In her maiden speech on 9 November 2017, Allan recalled the first time she saw the Beehive at age 17 and recited a poem she had written at the time.

In her first term in Parliament, Allan was a member of the finance and expenditure committee and the primary production committee. She was also elected a junior whip of the Labour Party. She joined the Epidemic Response Committee during the COVID-19 pandemic. She was also the chair of Labour's rural caucus.

In 2018, she launched the down-to-earth political podcast Authorised By with Green Party MP Chlöe Swarbrick. She got on well with Swarbrick and they both felt the average Kiwi on the street was detached from politics. By the end of the year, Allan was labelled a strong performer among backbenchers in Parliament and a potential future minister.

The 52nd Parliament voted on several conscience issues. Allan generally maintained a progressive voting record, voting in support of the third readings of the End of Life Choice Bill and Abortion Legislation Bill. She had previously voted against the End of Life Choice Bill in the second reading, due to concerns that it did not sufficiently protect vulnerable people, and supported efforts by Jenny Marcroft to ensure the bill would be voted on in a binding referendum.

Ahead of the 2020 New Zealand general election, Allan was ranked at 25 on Labour's party list and was selected to contest the East Coast electorate again. Tolley retired, leaving the seat open. Amid a landslide nationwide victory for the Labour party, Allan defeated new National Party East Coast candidate Tania Tapsell by 6,331 votes to win her second term in Parliament and her first as an electorate representative. After the election, Allan was one of several MPs who received petitions calling on the government to change the laws related to Māori wards and constituencies.

== Minister in the Sixth Labour Government ==
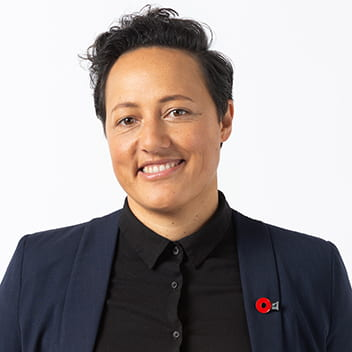
Electoral portrait, 2020

On 2 November 2020, prime minister Jacinda Ardern announced Kiri Allan would enter Cabinet during her second term in parliament, becoming Minister for Conservation and Minister for Emergency Management. In addition, Allan also assumed associate ministerial responsibilities in the Arts, Culture and Heritage and Environment portfolios.

Allan gained prominence in early 2021 when she fronted emergency management press conferences about tsunami threats following repeated severe earthquakes in the Kermadec Islands that led to the largest evacuation in New Zealand history. Allan's authoritative yet informal communication style was marked out for further praise when it was revealed she had a medical examination that later confirmed a stage 3 cervical cancer diagnosis on the same morning as the disaster. She took three months leave to seek treatment and was eventually declared cancer-free.

As conservation minister, Allan oversaw the continued roll-out of the Jobs for Nature employment scheme and implementation of the government's biodiversity strategy. She announced a review of the Wildlife Act 1953 in December 2021. One week later, as Minister for Emergency Management, Allan also announced work to modernise emergency management legislation. As Associate Minister for Arts, Culture and Heritage, Allan was responsible for a new law that marked the celebration of Matariki with a public holiday starting from 2022.

In a June 2022 reshuffle, Allan was promoted from her existing roles to instead be Minister of Justice. She also joined the government's economic ministerial group as an Associate Minister of Finance. Following Jacinda Ardern's resignation as prime minister in January 2023, Allan was speculated to be a Labour leadership candidate, but declined to run and instead co-nominated senior minister Chris Hipkins' successful candidacy. Hipkins, as the new prime minister, continued Allan in the justice portfolio, promoted her to tenth in the Cabinet, and also appointed her as Minister for Regional Development and Associate Minister of Transport. She was a lead minister in the response to Cyclone Gabrielle in the Gisborne and Bay of Plenty regions.

As justice minister, Allan was a highly active legislator. At one point it was reported that of the 26 government bills being considered by committees, she was responsible for six of them. She led the government's work on electoral reform, sponsoring legislation on electoral finance reform, broader voter eligibility for New Zealanders living overseas, and reform of the Māori Electoral Option. A bill to lower the voting age to 16 was considered after the Crown lost in Make It 16 Incorporated v Attorney-General but was ultimately not progressed. In judicial system reform, Allan completed the government's long-promised repeal of three-strikes sentencing law, which had been linked to the over-incarceration of Māori, and also increased access to legal aid. Allan also led proposals related to the sale and supply of alcohol, hate speech, counter-terrorism, name suppression, surrogacy, and lobbying.

Heading into the 2023 general election, the government was criticised as being "soft on crime". In response, the government adopted "tougher" youth justice policies such as the creation of a new offence for ram-raiding, which Allan announced on 18 July 2023. Allan later said these policies were not aligned with her personal values and contributed to a mental health breakdown soon after.

In mid-2023, Allan was involved in a number of personal and professional scandals including making inappropriate comments about Radio New Zealand hiring practices and allegations of bullying within her ministerial offices (see: Controversies). Ultimately, Allan resigned from her ministerial roles and declined to seek re-election after being arrested for careless use of a motor vehicle and refusing to accompany a police officer when she crashed her ministerial car the night of 23 July 2023. In exit interviews the next year, Allan revealed that she had intended to end her life that night.

On 11 September 2023, Allan was granted the use of the honorific prefix The Honourable for life, in recognition of her term as a member of the Executive Council.

== Controversies ==
=== Radio New Zealand speech ===
Allan made a controversial speech at Radio New Zealand's (RNZ) Wellington office on 31 March 2023 as part of the farewell event for departing employee Māni Dunlop, who was her fiancée at the time. Dunlop had been a front runner to take over Susie Ferguson's role on Morning Report, but resigned when the role was offered to Ingrid Hipkiss. Commentators have suggested the reason Dunlop wasn't offered the role was because she was engaged to Allan, a senior Cabinet Minister, which would make it difficult for her to cover crime and justice related stories.

However, at the farewell event, Allan chose to comment on RNZ's alleged inability to retain Māori employees and suggested the senior leadership team needed to look into it. Allan later acknowledged that her comments might have been interpreted as giving RNZ instruction on how to manage its staff or organisation, which Ministers are not allowed to do. She later apologised and stated that was not her intent. Three months later, it was reported that Allan and Dunlop were no longer in a relationship.

=== Meng Foon donations ===
During the 2020 general election campaign, Allan received donations from Meng Foon, the former mayor of Gisborne and current Race Relations Commissioner, including a rent subsidy from one of Foon's companies for the lease of Allan's electoral office in a storefront previously occupied by Foon's wife. When Allan became justice minister two years later, she gained ministerial responsibility for Foon in his role as Commissioner. The donations were revealed in April 2023. While Allan did make the necessary declarations of the donations under electoral law, she was criticised for not proactively identifying a conflict of interest between her and Foon, although she later corrected that. Ministerial responsibility for the Race Relations Commissioner was transferred to the associate justice minister, Deborah Russell, before Foon resigned in June 2023 for failing to declare other conflicts of interests.

=== Bullying allegations ===
In June 2023, concerns were raised by the heads of two government agencies—the Department of Conservation (DOC) and the National Emergency Management Agency (NEMA)—about how Allan had treated her staff in her Cabinet office. This followed information that someone on secondment from DOC working in her office left early "due to the working relationships in the office". Allan responded to the allegations saying that no one had laid a formal complaint about her behaviour. On 3 July, Allan was on leave, with both her and Prime Minister Chris Hipkins confirming that she was not on mental health leave. The prime minister reminded ministers about the need to treat their staff with respect and stated that he would discuss her workplace issues with her after he had returned from his trip to Europe.

On 14 July, Hipkins confirmed that Allan would return from leave on 17 July to resume her ministerial duties, and that she would also receive extra coaching to help her promote a "positive work environment." Allan also issued an apology for her past behaviour and offered to speak to anyone who wanted to talk to her individually. She also resolved to promote a positive workplace environment.

=== Criminal charges and resignation of portfolios ===
On 23 July 2023, Allan was arrested for careless use of a motor vehicle and refusing to accompany a police officer, after crashing her ministerial car into a parked car. Following the incident, Allan was located approximately 500 metres away from the crash site. She was also issued an infringement notice for having excess breath alcohol. Allan acknowledged she was still struggling with mental health issues, and resigned her ministerial portfolios the following morning. In a statement, she acknowledged that she was unable to juggle her personal difficulties "with the pressure of being a Minister". Allan's portfolios were subsequently allocated to other ministers, with Ginny Andersen assuming her justice portfolio. On 25 July, Allan announced that she would not contest the 2023 New Zealand general election but would remain MP for East Coast until October 2023. She also apologised to Hipkins, her cabinet colleagues, and constituents.

Hipkins described the incident as an "absolute tragedy", stating that "had I been able to foresee this, of course there would have been more things that we might have been able to do." National Party leader Christopher Luxon expressed support for Allan but criticised the Prime Minister for allegedly failing to set expectations for his Cabinet ministers. Similar sentiments were echoed by ACT Party leader David Seymour, who criticised the Labour Government's recent turnover of cabinet ministers. By contrast, Te Pāti Māori co-leader Debbie Ngarewa-Packer claimed that Allan was the latest in a series of Māori women MPs who had not been looked after in Parliament. National MPs Sam Uffindell and Todd Muller expressed sympathy and support for Allan.

On 30 November 2023, Allan confirmed that she would be pleading not guilty to a charges of careless driving and failing to accompany a police officer on the grounds that she did not have access to a lawyer. In rationalising her decision, Allan stated that her sole purpose was to ensure that the police and the public "have certainty about when the right to legal counsel is available."

On 22 May 2024, Allan pleaded guilty to both charges of careless driving and failing to accompany a police officer. Allan was initially expected to face a judge-alone trial on the charge of failing to accompany a police officer. Judge Brooke Gibson convicted her on both charges but discharged her on the second charge. She was fined NZ$300 for careless driving and ordered to pay NZ$5,296 for damage done to the vehicle. Allan did not attend sentencing proceedings but was represented by her lawyer Christopher Stevenson, who agreed with the summary of facts that Allan had refused to accompany a police officer multiple times despite being advised that a lawyer would be made available at a "practical time".

== Personal life ==
Allan married Natalie Coates in 2016 after same-sex marriage was legalised in New Zealand. They had a baby just before the 2017 election, of whom fellow Labour MP Tāmati Coffey is the biological father. Allan brought the baby to Parliament. Allan and Coates divorced in May 2022. Allan had a previous relationship with another Labour Party MP, Meka Whaitiri.

In April 2021, Allan announced she would be taking medical leave from parliament after being diagnosed with stage 3 cervical cancer. In December 2021 she announced that after treatment she was cancer-free and encouraged others to have regular testing for different forms of cancer.

In 2022, Allan became engaged to RNZ National presenter Māni Dunlop, but they broke up in 2023. In June 2023, Allan took leave from Parliament following the breakup. On 3 July, Allan went on leave again. This decision followed concerns raised by public servants about her management style and her relationships with staff in her office.

On 23 July 2023, Allan was involved in a car crash in Wellington, and was charged with careless driving and refusing to accompany a police officer. She also received an infringement offence for excess breath alcohol. The following day, Allan resigned from all ministerial portfolios. Prime minister Chris Hipkins, noted that Allan's behaviour was related to the break-down of her relationship with Dunlop. On 4 September, Allan revealed that she had been diagnosed with attention deficit hyperactivity disorder and post-traumatic stress disorder. In 2024, she revealed she had intended to end her life the night of her car accident.

After exiting Parliament, Allan announced in October 2023 she is writing a book to be published by Penguin and launched her own lobbying consultancy. The consultancy was registered two weeks after she resigned as justice minister, and while she was still an MP; Allan was criticised for contributing to the perception of a "revolving door" between politics and lobbying that she was responsible for regulating while justice minister.

Political offices
Preceded by Eugenie Sage	Minister of Conservation; 2020–2022	Succeeded by Poto Williams
Preceded by Peeni Henare	Minister for Emergency Management; 2020–2022	Succeeded by Kieran McAnulty
Preceded by Stuart Nash as Minister for Economic and Regional Development	Minister for Regional Development; 2023	Succeeded by Kieran McAnulty
Preceded by Kris Faafoi	Minister of Justice; 2022–2023	Succeeded by Ginny Andersen
New Zealand Parliament
Preceded by Anne Tolley	Member of Parliament for East Coast; 2020–present	Incumbent
