= Paparoa National Park =

National park in New Zealand

- IUCN category II (national park)
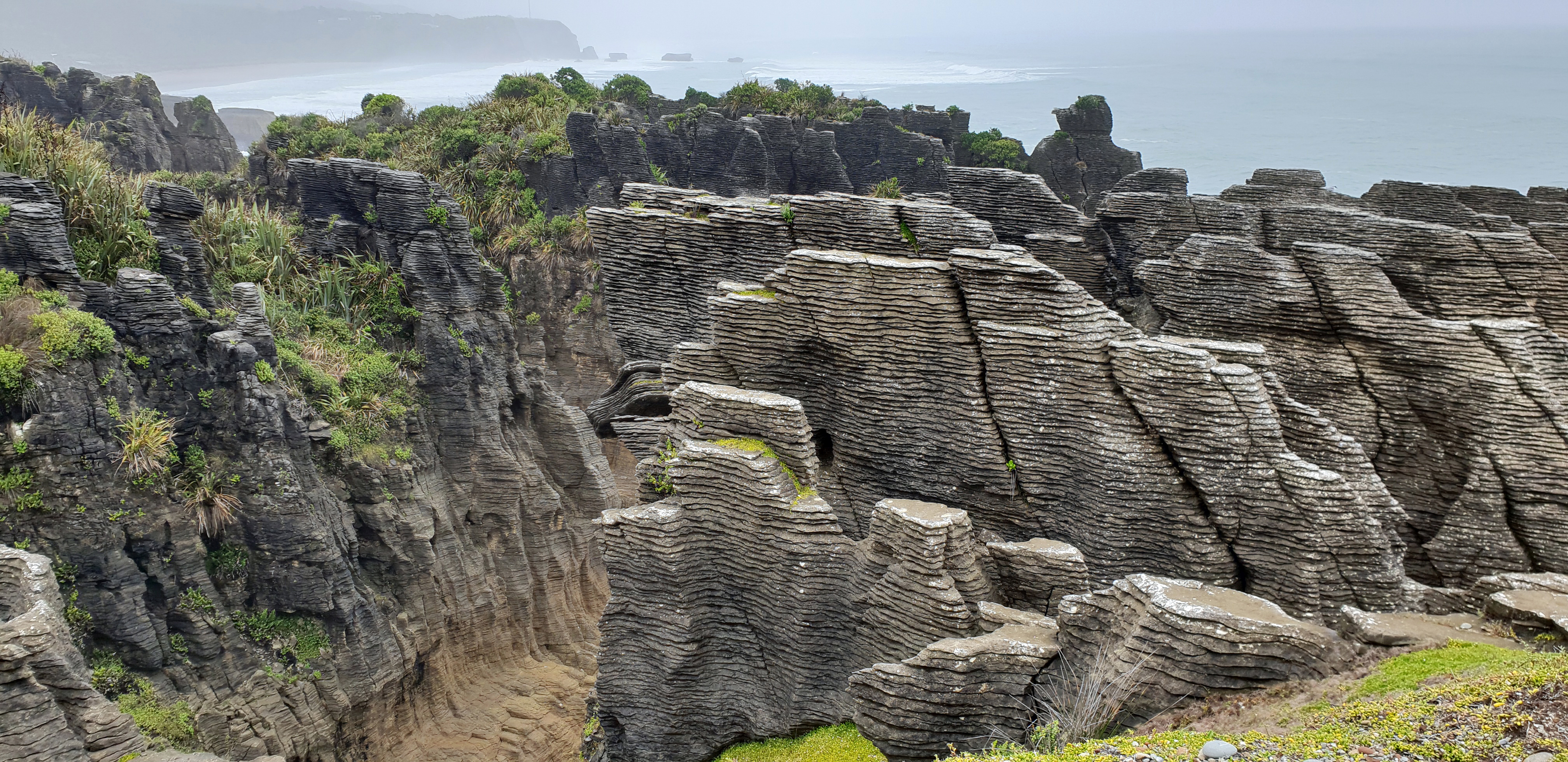
- Pancake Rocks
- Interactive map of Paparoa National Park
- Location: West Coast, New Zealand
- Coordinates: 42°5′S 171°30′E
- Area: 429.7 km^{2} (165.9 sq mi)
- Established: 1 January 1987
- Governing body: Department of Conservation

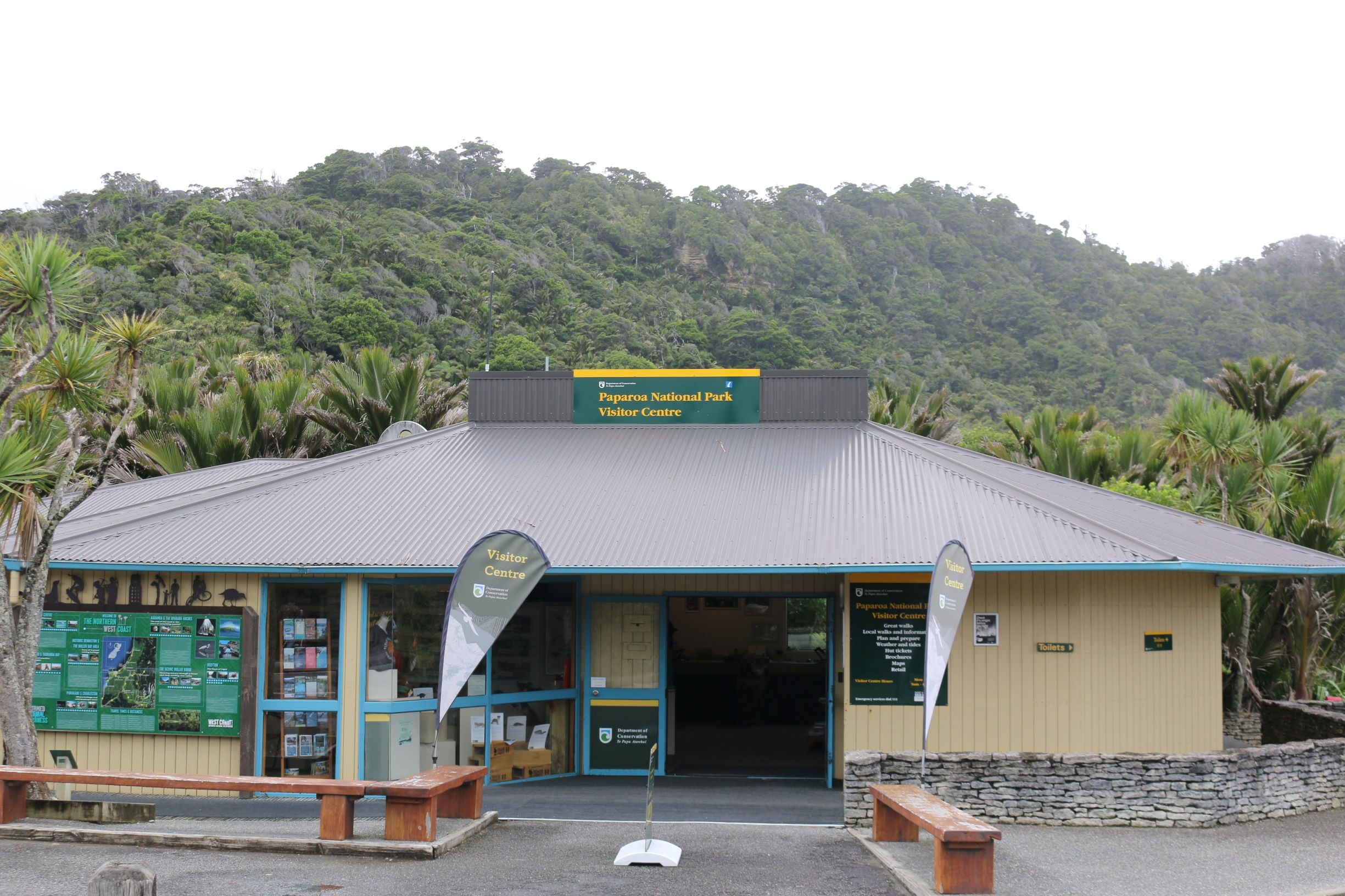
Paparoa National Park Visitor Centre (2021)

Paparoa National Park is on the west coast of the South Island of New Zealand. The park was established in 1987 and encompasses 430 km^{2} (170 sq mi). The park ranges from or near the coastline to the peaks of the Paparoa Range. A separate section of the park lies to the north and is centred at Ananui Creek. The park protects a limestone karst area. The park contains several caves, of which Metro Cave / Te Ananui Cave is a commercial tourist attraction. The majority of the park is forested with a wide variety of vegetation. The park was the site of the 1995 Cave Creek disaster, where fourteen people died as a result of the collapse of a scenic viewing platform.

The Paparoa Track, one of New Zealand's Great Walks, runs through the park.

The small settlement of Punakaiki, adjacent to the Pancake Rocks and Blowholes tourist attraction, lies on the edge of the park. The park is also located near the towns of Westport, Greymouth, and Barrytown.

== History ==
=== Park establishment ===
In 1976, the Federated Mountain Clubs had identified the northern part of the Paparoa Ranges as a potential wilderness area. In 1979, the Native Forest Action Council proposed a 130,000-hectare national park encompassing the northern Paparoa Ranges and surrounding land to the north and east. This eventually led the National Parks and Reserves Authority to identify the western Paparoa Range as a prospective national park. Meanwhile, a joint proposal by the Department of Scientific and Industrial Research and the National Museum succeeded in having a core area of great ecological significance – the forests of the lowland karst syncline – gazetted as the Pororari Ecological Area in 1979.

The initial proposal for a large park incorporating the wilderness area was rejected, but after seven rounds of submissions and help from other environmental groups, including the Royal Forest and Bird Protection Society, an area of 30,327 hectares was gazetted as Paparoa National Park on 23 November 1987.

=== Expansion ===
Following the liquidation of Pike River Coal, Solid Energy acquired its assets. The government then purchased the 3,580 hectares (8,800 acres) of land around the Pike River Mine. The environment minister, Nick Smith, announced on 15 November 2015 that 3,580 ha of land would be added to the Park.

== Geography ==
=== Location ===
Paparoa National Park is located in the northern West Coast region of the South Island, between the Buller River (Kawatiri) and the Grey River (Māwheranui). It includes the western side of the Paparoa Range and some separate eastern sections along the Inangahua River. The park covers the catchment areas of the Punakaiki, Pororari and Fox (Potikohua) rivers and Bullock Creek (Punungairo), and also the Metro / Te Ananui cave system and the southern side of the Tiropahi River catchment.

== Geology ==
=== Landforms ===
The park has unusually diverse geology with a wide variety of coastal, lowland, and mountain landforms. The major geological structures that form the park are the Barrytown syncline, the Punakaiki anticline, the Paparoa Tectonic Zone, the Cape Foulwind fault, and the Hawera fault. Most of the land area of the park is mountainous. The eastern side of the main range has deep glaciated valleys that run north and south, with towering bluffs and cirques, hanging valleys, and truncated spurs. The western coastline is known for its spectacular, varied scenery and accessibility.

=== Mountains ===
The Paparoa mountains were uplifted during the late Pliocene or early Quaternary periods. Mt Lodge, the highest mountain in the park at 1,447 metres (4,747 ft), has rocks that are the oldest in New Zealand. Over the last 10 million years, the movement of the Alpine Fault has separated the predominantly granite and gneiss rocks of the Paparoas from their original neighbours, so that they now more closely resemble the rocks in Fiordland, far to the southwest, than to the relatively nearby main range of the Southern Alps.

=== Karst ===
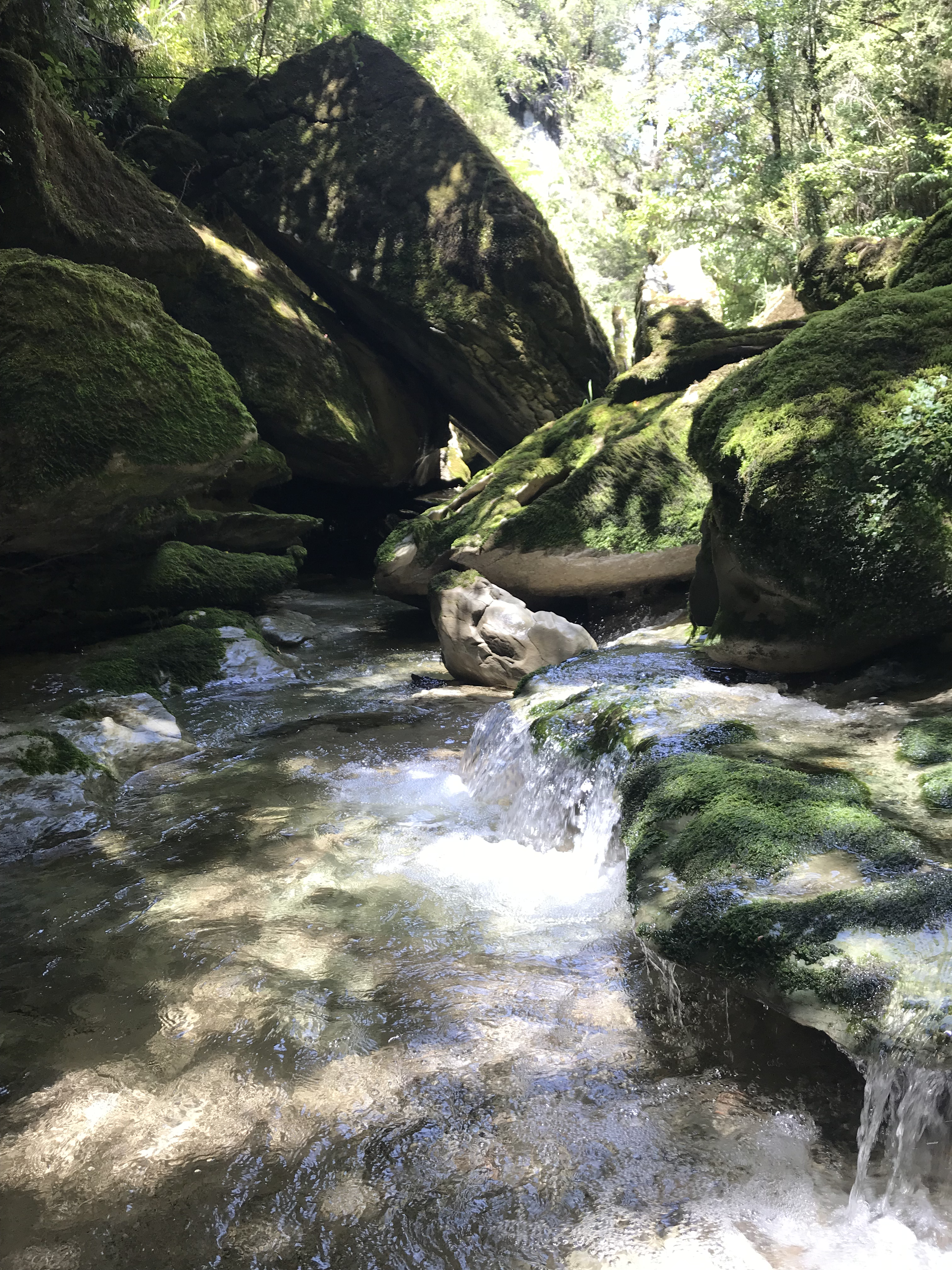
Cave Creek resurgence

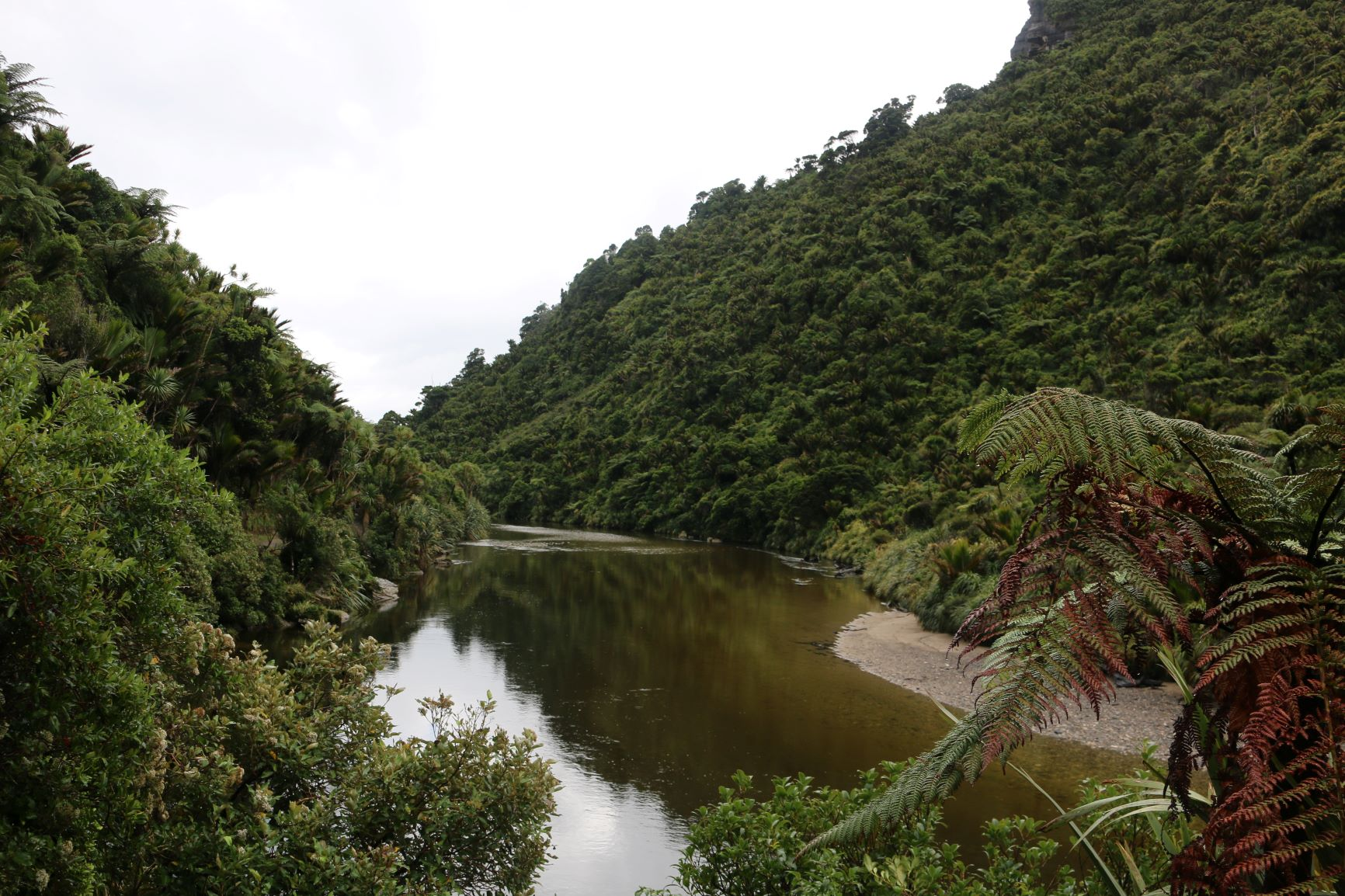
Pororari River Track

Rivers flowing from the Paparoa Ranges pass through the limestone syncline, creating subterranean waterways and extensive cave systems, which are among the park's features. The main rivers are the Fox, Pororari and Punakaiki. Another of the rivers is Cave Creek, site of the 1995 Cave Creek disaster. A complex cave system feeds Cave Creek.

Upstream of the Xanadu and Taurus Major sinkholes, on Bullock Creek (the most northerly on the west coast, others being near Ross and Fox Glacier), a polje of up to about 1 km (0.62 mi) square and 1 m (3 ft 3 in) deep can form after heavy rain. Bush felling and drainage took place in the polje from the 1870s, but the wetland ecology has been undergoing restoration since 1986. The other large polje in this country is at Lake Disappear in Waikato.

The river gorges, confined by high, forest-crowned limestone cliffs, provide access to the park's karst interior. However, in many tributaries, the gorges are narrow and steep, with waterfalls. Dry, mossy streambeds, karren, sinkholes (or dolines), blind valleys and basins where water emerges from caves or vanishes into sinks are all indicators of the complex subterranean system beneath. Intricate systems of shafts, passages, and caverns have been slowly formed by the continual effects of water through the soluble limestone. The forest ensures this process continues by supplying decaying vegetation that adds to the acidity of the flowing water. The largest single feature in the karst region is the Barrytown syncline. Limestone is exposed on both flanks of the syncline, with more recent gravels and mudstones occupying the low-lying area in between. These more easily erodible rocks overlie interstratal karst. The majority of known cave systems are on the western side of the limestone syncline, where underground drainage patterns are concentrated along horizontal lines of weakness in the bedding planes.

=== Coastal region ===
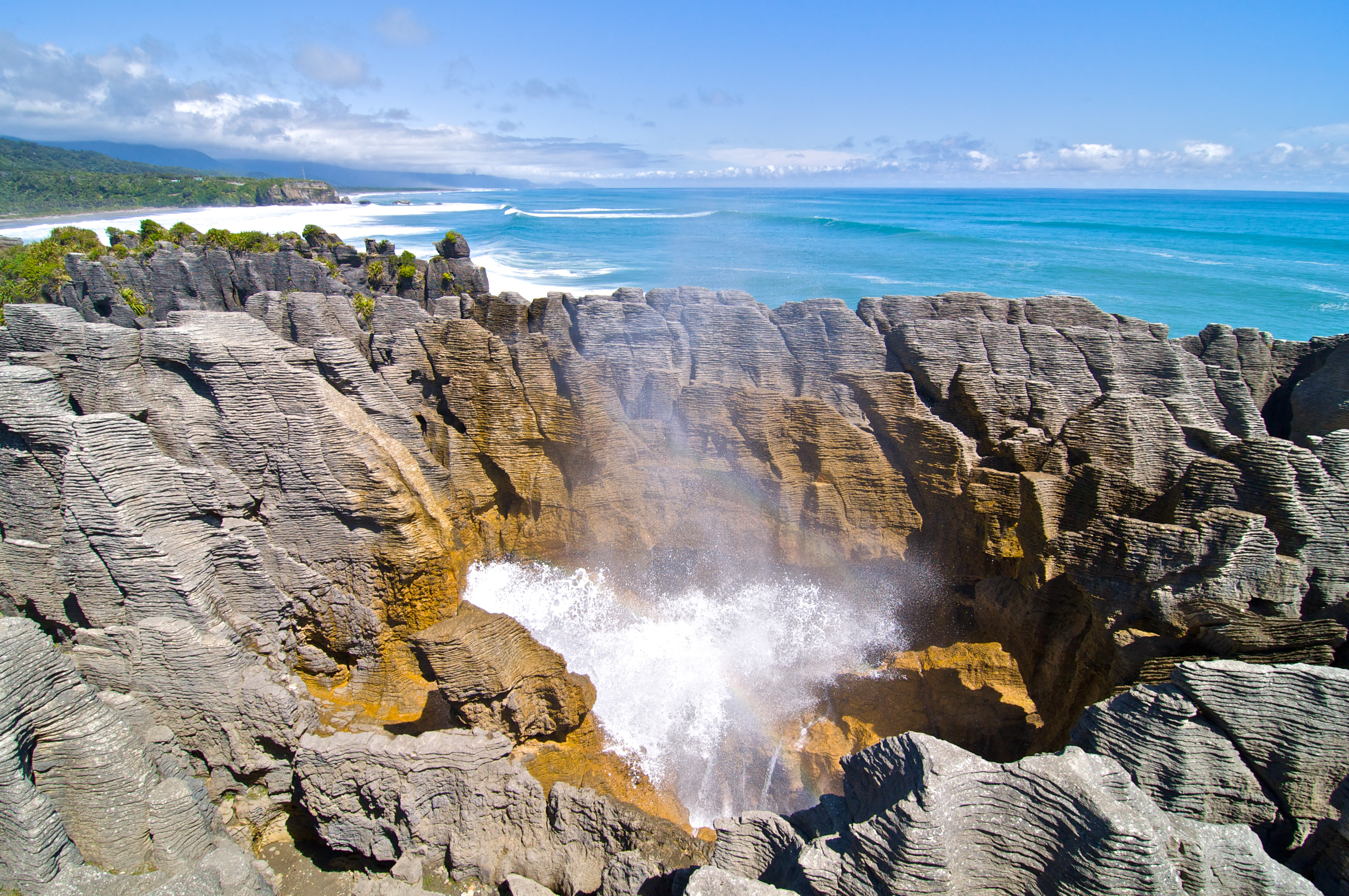
The "Pancake Rocks" at Paparoa National Park

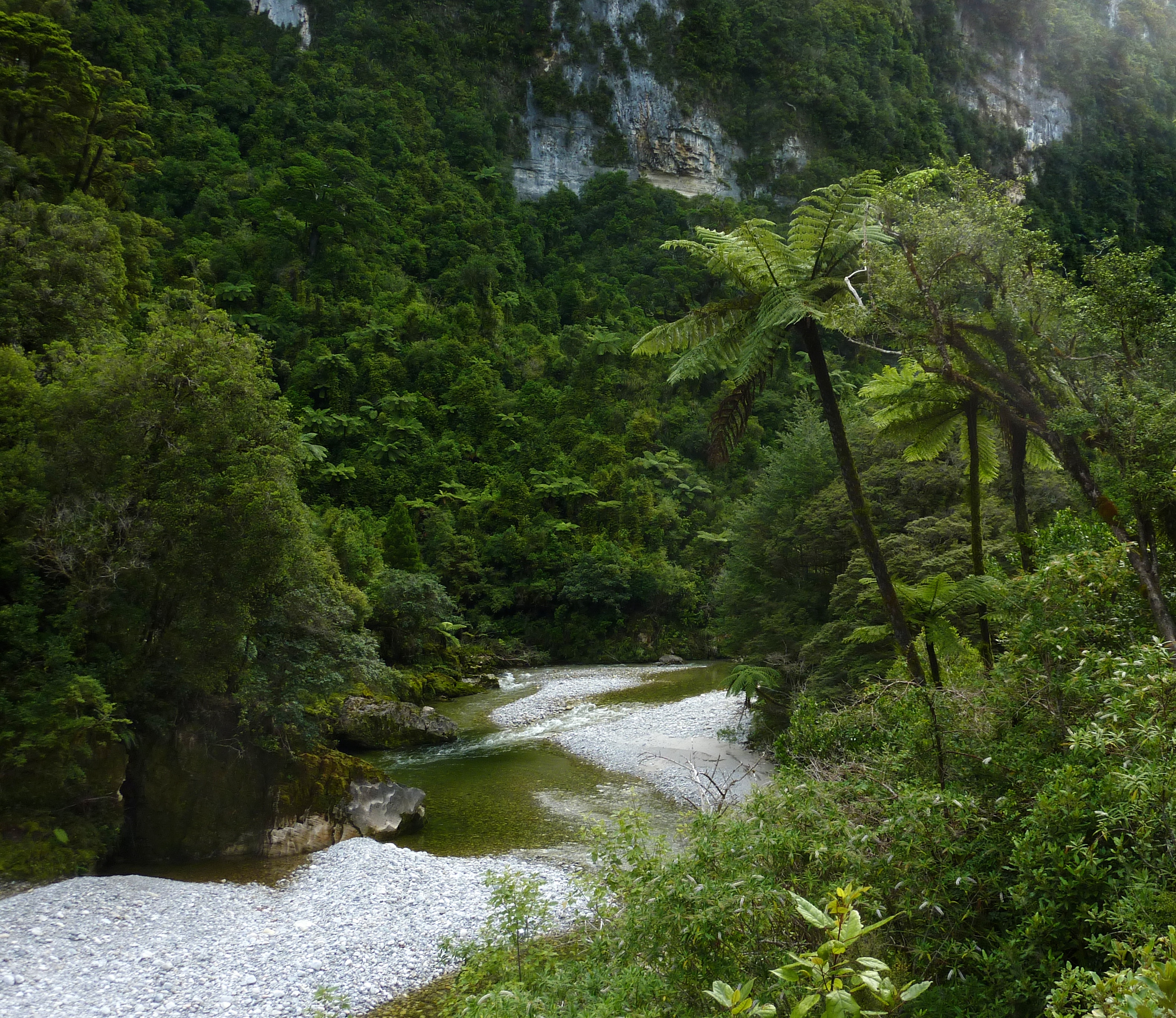
Fox River- Paparoa National Park

The Paparoa coastline is characterised by high cliffs cut away by waves from the Tasman Sea, with indented coves and sandy beaches. There are small islands offshore and rock pillars. These terraces were once islands, which became part of the mainland when New Zealand was uplifted quite recently in its geological history. The most well-known feature of the coastal region is the Pancake Rocks and Blowholes at Dolomite Point, near Punakaiki, where evenly layered stacks of platey limestone have been eroded in places to form surge pools and blowholes.

== Ecology ==
=== Fauna ===
Bird habitats within the park range from the coastline to the peak of the Paparoa Ranges. Several species, such as tūī, bellbirds, kākā, kererū (New Zealand pigeon), and parakeets, migrate from winter habitat in the lower forests to summer habitat in the upland forests.

A significant feature of the coast is the colony of the rare seabird, the Westland petrel (tāiko), located on densely forested terraces just south of the Punakaiki River. The Westland petrel breeding site at Punakaiki has been identified as an Important Bird Area by BirdLife International.

Large colonies of New Zealand fur seals have been established in adjacent areas around Westport, such as at Cape Foulwind. Rare southern elephant seals and leopard seals also visit. Hector's dolphins (some of the highest population densities in the nation) and some other dolphins including killer whales can be observed close to shores as well. For whales, their number is still very small, but various species have been observed.

== Conservation and human interaction ==
=== Protection from mining ===
Although Paparoa National Park is protected from mining under Schedule 4 of the Crown Minerals Act, there have been proposals to allow some mining within its borders. On 22 March 2010, Gerry Brownlee (Minister of Energy and Resources) and Kate Wilkinson (Minister of Conservation) released a discussion paper including a proposal to remove 7,058 hectares of land from Schedule Four of the Crown Minerals Act 1991, including the Inangahua sector of Paparoa National Park. The area of the Inangahua sector included in this proposal was 3,315 hectares, or 8 per cent of the park. The proposed change would remove the prohibition on mining for the area concerned. On 26 March 2010, a spokesman for Gerry Brownlee said that opencast mining in Paparoa National Park could not be ruled out.

On 20 July 2010, in a joint statement by Brownlee and Wilkinson, the Government announced that it had received 37,552 submissions on its discussion paper, and that it had decided not to remove any land from Schedule 4 of the Crown Minerals Act for further mineral exploration or extraction. Ms Wilkinson said the government had agreed to continue with its proposal to add 14 areas with a total of 12,400 hectares of land to Schedule 4, including 240 hectares of Paparoa National Park (the northwest addition).

=== Activities ===
The park is a popular location for tramping, walking, and viewing scenery and caves. The Truman Track, located 3 kilometres (1.9 mi) north of Punakaiki, provides access from State Highway 6 to a headland via a short walk through coastal forest of ferns, nīkau palms, podocarps and rātā, with flax nearer the coastline. The Paparoa Track is another popular route.

==== Paparoa Track and Pike29 Memorial Track ====
A 55 km (34 mi) walkway, the Paparoa Track from Blackball to Punakaiki and the Pike29 Memorial Track were constructed through the park as a memorial to the 29 miners lost in the 2010 Pike River Mine disaster. Most of the families of the victims approved, but there has been some criticism because Solid Energy decided in 2014 that it was too risky to re-enter the mine to recover any remains from the mine.

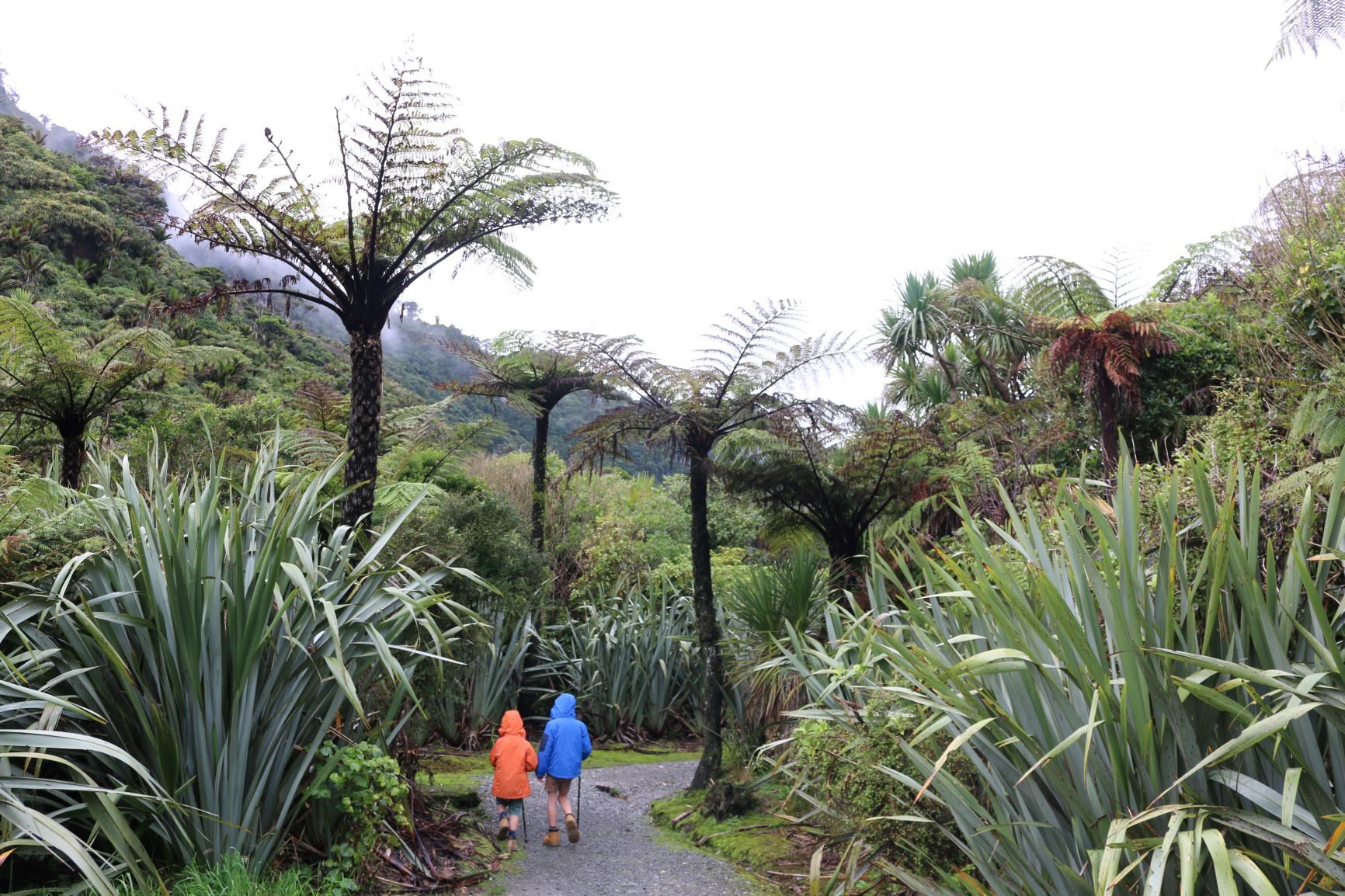
Paparoa Track (Pororari river)

The formation of the Paparoa Track has been a catalyst for the emerging adventure sports community on the West Coast with events such as The Paparoa which features trail running and mountain biking over the track. The event is based on the region's mining history and also celebrates the exceptional female adventure athletes it has produced, such as Casey Brown, Ruth Croft, and Emily Miazga.

== See also ==
- National parks of New Zealand
- Forest parks of New Zealand
- Regional parks of New Zealand
- Protected areas of New Zealand
- Conservation in New Zealand
