= Eugenie Sage =

New Zealand politician (born 1958)

The Honourable Eugenie Sage
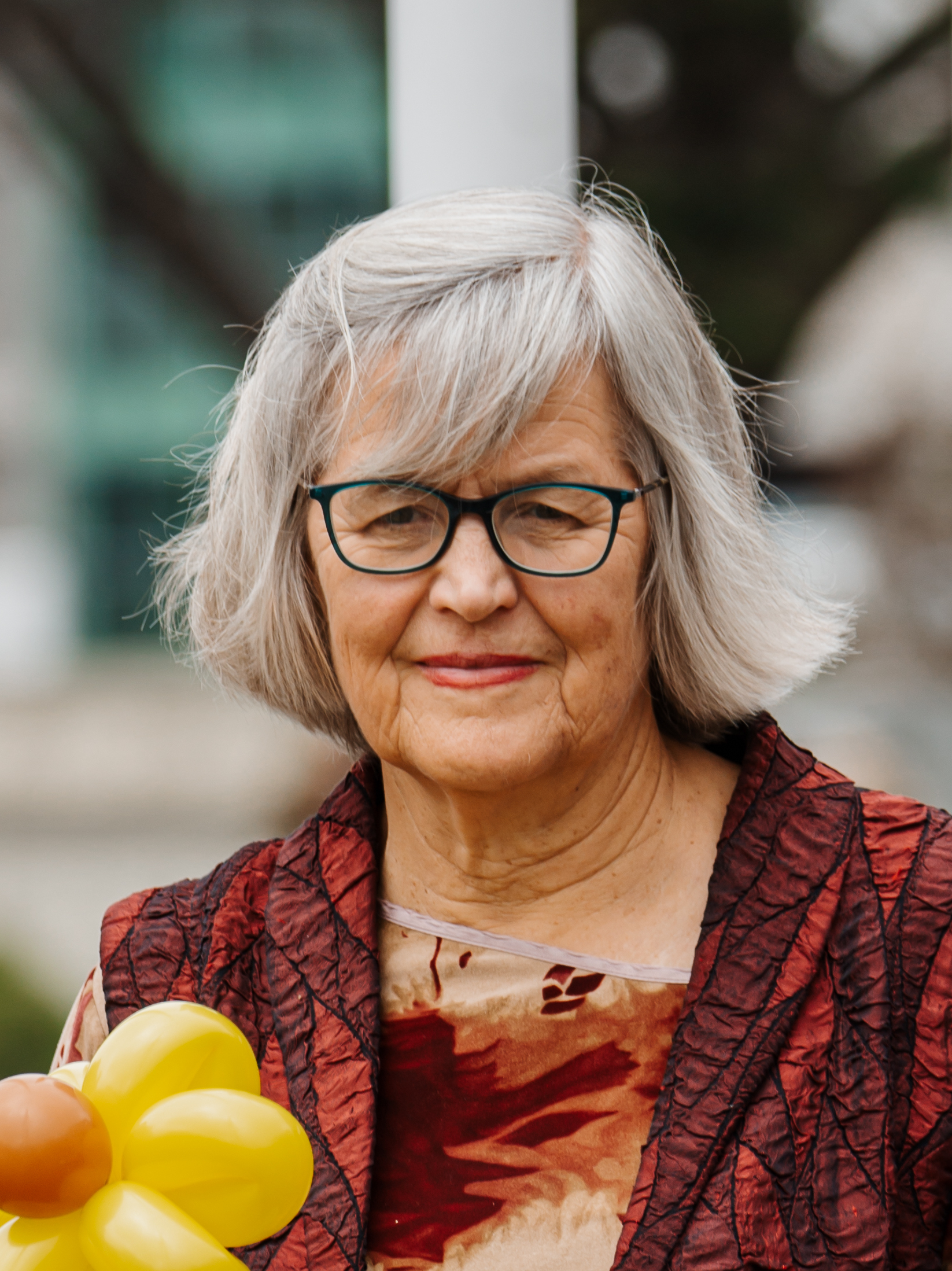
- Sage in 2023

13th Minister of Conservation
- In office 26 October 2017 – 6 November 2020
- Prime Minister: Jacinda Ardern
- Preceded by: Maggie Barry
- Succeeded by: Kiri Allan

16th Minister for Land Information
- In office 26 October 2017 – 6 November 2020
- Prime Minister: Jacinda Ardern
- Preceded by: Mark Mitchell
- Succeeded by: Damien O'Connor

Member of the New Zealand Parliament for Green party list
- In office 10 December 2011 – 14 October 2023

Personal details
- Born: 1958 (age 67–68) Auckland, New Zealand
- Party: Green
- Relations: Pat Suggate (father-in-law)
- Website: Green Party profile

Eugenie Meryl Sage (born 1958) is a New Zealand environmentalist and former politician. She was a Green Party Member of Parliament in the New Zealand House of Representatives from 2011 to 2023.

Sage served as Minister of Conservation, Minister for Land Information and Associate Minister for the Environment from 2017 to 2020, in the first term of the Sixth Labour Government.

== Early life ==
Sage was born in Auckland, the first of four children to parents Meryl (née Williams) and Tony Sage, who was a chartered accountant. She attended St Cuthbert's College, Auckland. Between secondary school and university, Sage worked as a cleaner and kitchen hand at an Auckland retirement village and rest home. At the University of Auckland, Sage studied arts and law, wrote for Craccum and participated in environmental activism. After graduation, she went on to study journalism at the University of Canterbury, earning a post-graduate diploma in 1984.

Sage's long-time partner is Richard Suggate, a former Department of Conservation manager.

== Career ==
Before holding elected office, Sage had a career in communications and environmentalism. Her first professional role was working as a communications officer for the New Zealand Forest Service based on the West Coast. From 1984 to 1990 she worked at Parliament in Wellington as a research officer for the New Zealand Labour Party and as a press secretary for Helen Clark. At the time that Sage worked in her office, Clark was the Minister of Conservation and the Department of Conservation had been newly established.

Moving to Christchurch in 1990, Sage worked as a freelance journalist and later as a field officer and spokesperson for Forest & Bird from 1993 until 2007. Working for Forest & Bird, she gained a public profile advocating against the environmental impacts of logging, mining, and dairy farming.

== Local government career ==
Sage contested and won the Selwyn–Banks Peninsula constituency of Environment Canterbury (the Canterbury Regional Council) at the 2007 local elections. Sage's defeat of the incumbent, former Selwyn mayor Bill Woods, was described as one of the election's biggest surprises. Sage was one of four new councillors elected who had campaigned on a "pro-water" platform. She was aligned with the centre-left bloc of councillors who supported Sir Kerry Burke in the council's leadership elections in October 2007 and September 2009.

On the council, Sage was assigned responsibility for pest management and oversaw measures to control weeds, possums, and wild goats. Water was a major issue during the 2007–2010 council term as the council looked to agree a new regional water strategy. At the same time, dairy farming was continuing to intensify in the region and the council had been ranked last among 84 councils in terms of resource consent processing in 2009. A review of the council was initiated by environment minister Nick Smith and local government minister Rodney Hide which recommended the council be replaced with commissioners and a new Canterbury Water Authority be established. Sage described the government's decision as acting in the interests of agribusiness and irrigation lobbyists. She lost her councillor position on 1 May 2010 when the council was disestablished, but was appointed as a community member to the Selwyn-Waihora Zone Water Management Committee of Canterbury Water Management Strategy (CWMS) in October 2010.

== Member of Parliament ==
New Zealand Parliament
Years	Term	Electorate	List	Party
2011–2014	50th	List	6	Green
2014–2017	51st	List	4	Green
2017–2020	52nd	List	4	Green
2020–2023	53rd	List	6	Green

Sage contested the Selwyn electorate at the 2011 general election for the Green Party. Although she did not win the electorate, she was ranked at sixth on the party's list. The Green Party received sufficient votes to return 14 list members and Sage entered Parliament for the first time.

In her maiden statement delivered on 15 February 2012, Sage said she would not have run for parliament if the Environment Canterbury regional council had not been replaced with commissioners. She also spoke of her ambitions to create new marine protected areas around the Kermadec Islands and in the Ross Sea, and to enact stronger plant and water conservation laws.

Sage was re-elected as a list MP three years later after unsuccessfully contesting the Port Hills electorate. In addition to her caucus responsibilities as her party's spokesperson on Christchurch, conservation, the environment, land information, local government, resource management issues, and water, she served as deputy chairperson of the local government and environment committee from 2011 to 2014 and as a member of that committee from 2014 to 2017.

=== Minister in the Sixth Labour Government, 2017–2020 ===
During the 2017 election, Sage contested Port Hills for a second time, coming third place. She was re-elected to Parliament on the Green Party list.

Following the formation of the Sixth Labour Government, Sage assumed the ministerial portfolios for Conservation and Land Information, and Associate Minister for the Environment. In her two main positions, Sage was responsible for the two government agencies—the Department of Conservation and Land Information New Zealand—which managed more than one-third of New Zealand's land area. As Associate Minister for the Environment, Sage had responsibility for waste and oversaw the phase-out of single-use plastic bags in New Zealand. She acted as Minister for Women in 2018 when Julie Anne Genter took maternity leave.

As Conservation Minister, Sage led the development of Te Mana o te Taiao, the Aotearoa New Zealand Biodiversity Strategy, began a governance review of Fish & Game New Zealand, and initiated a controversial cull of imported Himalayan tahr on conservation land which resulted in her receiving death threats and was eventually scaled down. She established the $1.2 billion Jobs For Nature programme as part of the government's COVID-19 relief efforts and opened the Paparoa Track Great Walk in 2020. However, she failed to deliver a planned and funded drylands park in the Mackenzie Basin or a proposed prohibition on mining on conservation land. The latter was reportedly due to Government parties disagreeing on the policy.

As Land Information Minister, Sage had a decision-making role related to overseas ownership of New Zealand land. She was criticised by former Green MP Sue Bradford for approving "nearly every" application despite Green Party policy opposed to the practice of foreign land ownership; Sage said she did not have discretion under the law to decline many applications. Sage also attracted criticism for disagreeing with Labour ministers on some overseas investment decisions where joint decision-making was required; on one occasion after she had refused to agree to the expansion of a gold mine in Waihi a new application by the same company for the same land was referred to different ministers for a final decision. A review into the Overseas Investment Act was initiated in April 2019 but Labour's Associate Finance Minister David Parker was assigned responsibility for the review.

=== Final term and retirement ===
During the 2020 New Zealand election that was held on 17 October, Sage was re-elected to Parliament on the party list. She also contested the Banks Peninsula electorate and came third place behind Labour's Tracey McLellan and National's Catherine Chu. She was not retained as a minister in the Government's second term and was instead appointed chairperson of Parliament's environment committee as part of the cooperation agreement between the Labour Party and the Green Party. She was also appointed the Green Party spokesperson for conservation, emergency management, the environment, forestry, land information, three waters, and oceans and fisheries. On 9 November 2020, Sage was granted retention of the title "The Honourable" for life, in recognition of her term as a member of the Executive Council.

A member's bill in Sage's name was drawn from the ballot and introduced into Parliament in August 2022. The Crown Minerals (Prohibition of Mining) Amendment Bill would prevent new permits being granted on conservation land and prevent all coal-mining permits from being granted on any land from 2025. Four years prior, when Sage was Conservation Minister, the Government had indicated it would not grant new permits for mining on conservation land. Public consultation on the issue was intended to be carried out from September 2018; however, in early 2020 Sage acknowledged that it had not been possible for Labour, the Greens and New Zealand First to agree on a discussion document. The policy was not progressed before the 2020 election and was dropped when Labour was re-elected without requiring Green Party support. Sage's member's bill was considered in 2023 but was defeated at first reading.

In late November 2022, Sage convinced the Labour Party to support a Green Party amendment that the Water Services Bill set a 60% parliamentary threshold for privatising public water assets. This entrenchment clause was controversial and attracted criticism from the opposition National and ACT parties, and the New Zealand Law Society. In early December 2022, Leader of the House and Labour MP Chris Hipkins announced that the anti-privatisation entrenchment clause would be removed. Due to the removal of the anti-privatisation clause, Sage and her fellow Green MPs withdrew their support for the Water Services Entities Bill, which passed with the sole support of the Labour Party on 7 December 2022.

In late December 2022, Sage announced she would not be contesting the upcoming 2023 election. Following the 2023 general election, Sage concluded her 12-year term as an MP.

== Political views ==
Sage has generally voted consistently with socially progressive positions. She voted in support of the Marriage (Definition of Marriage) Amendment Act 2013, End of Life Choice Act 2019, and Abortion Legislation Act 2020.

Political offices
Preceded by Maggie Barry	Minister of Conservation; 2017–2020	Succeeded by Kiri Allan
Preceded by Mark Mitchell	Minister for Land Information; 2017–2020	Succeeded by Damien O'Connor
