= Minister of Conservation (New Zealand) =

New Zealand minister of the Crown

- Coat of arms of New Zealand

- Flag of New Zealand

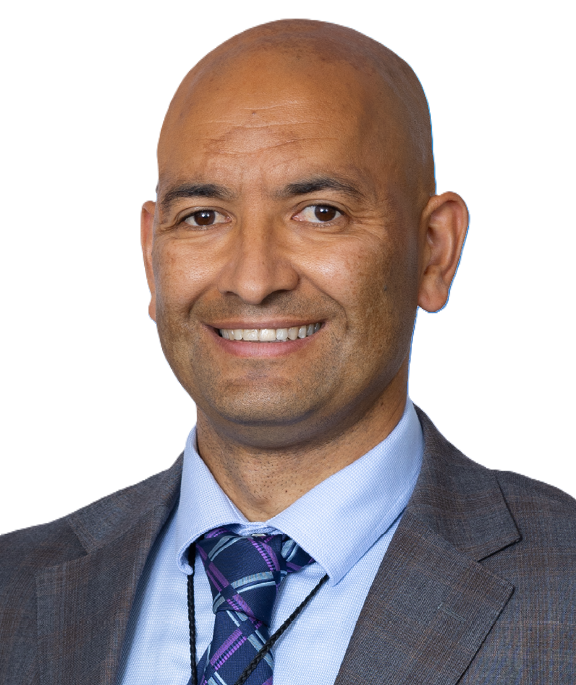
- Incumbent; Tama Potaka since 27 November 2023
- Department of Conservation
- Style: The Honourable
- Member of: Executive Council
- Reports to: Prime Minister of New Zealand
- Appointer: Governor-General of New Zealand
- Term length: At His Majesty's pleasure
- Formation: 1 April 1987
- First holder: Russell Marshall
- Salary: $288,900
- Website: www.beehive.govt.nz

The minister of conservation is a minister in the New Zealand Government with responsibility for promoting conservation of the natural and historic heritage of New Zealand.

The current minister is Tama Potaka.

== History ==
The role of Minister of Conservation was established in 1987 alongside the formation of the Department of Conservation and the passage of the Conservation Act 1987.

== Responsibilities ==
The minister leads the government's work on conservation issues and is responsible for advocating on behalf of conservation outcomes in the natural resources sector. In that way, the minister works closely with the Minister for the Environment, the Minister of Energy and Resources, the Minister for Oceans and Fisheries, the Minister for Biosecurity, the Minister for Land Information, the Minister of Local Government, the Minister of Tourism and the Minister of Agriculture.

As the responsible minister for the Department of Conservation, the minister's portfolio overseas 30% of the land area in New Zealand. In addition to the Conservation Act 1987, the minister is responsible for the Wildlife Act 1953, the Marine Reserves Act 1971, the Wild Animal Control Act 1977, the Marine Mammals Protection Act 1978, and the National Parks Act 1980. The minister has functions under the Resource Management Act 1991, including the New Zealand Coastal Policy Statement, approving regional coastal plans developed by local authorities, and acting as the local authority for the Kermadec and Subantarctic Islands.

The minister is responsible for acquiring land for conservation purposes, recommending the creation of national parks, granting concessions for activities on public conservation land, and establishing marine mammal sanctuaries and marine reserves.

The minister oversees and appoints members of the 15 regional conservation boards, the 29 reserves boards, the Fish & Game Council (and regional Fish & Game Councils), the Game Animal Council, the Game Bird Habitat Trust Board, the New Zealand Conservation Authority, and Predator Free 2050 Limited.

The Loder Cup awarded for conservation is presented by the minister.

== List of ministers ==
Key

Labour National Alliance Green

No.	Name	Portrait	Term of office		Prime Minister
1	Russell Marshall		1 April 1987	24 August 1987	Lange
2	Helen Clark		24 August 1987	30 January 1989	Lange
3	Philip Woollaston		30 January 1989	2 November 1990	Lange
3	Philip Woollaston		30 January 1989	2 November 1990	Palmer
3	Philip Woollaston		30 January 1989	2 November 1990	Moore
4	Denis Marshall		2 November 1990	30 May 1996	Bolger
5	Simon Upton		30 May 1996	16 December 1996	Bolger
6	Nick Smith		16 December 1996	10 December 1999	Bolger
6	Nick Smith		16 December 1996	10 December 1999	Shipley
7	Sandra Lee		10 December 1999	15 August 2002	Clark
8	Chris Carter		15 August 2002	31 October 2007	Clark
9	Steve Chadwick		31 October 2007	19 November 2008	Clark
10	Tim Groser		19 November 2008	27 January 2010	Key
11	Kate Wilkinson		27 January 2010	22 January 2013	Key
(6)	Nick Smith		22 January 2013	8 October 2014	Key
12	Maggie Barry		8 October 2014	26 October 2017	Key
12	Maggie Barry		8 October 2014	26 October 2017	English
13	Eugenie Sage		26 October 2017	6 November 2020	Ardern
14	Kiri Allan		6 November 2020	14 June 2022	Ardern
15	Poto Williams		14 June 2022	1 February 2023	Ardern
15	Poto Williams		14 June 2022	1 February 2023	Hipkins
16	Willow-Jean Prime		1 February 2023	27 November 2023	Hipkins
17	Tama Potaka		27 November 2023	present	Luxon

== See also ==
- Conservation in New Zealand
