= Blackball, New Zealand =

Town in the South Island of New Zealand

Blackball
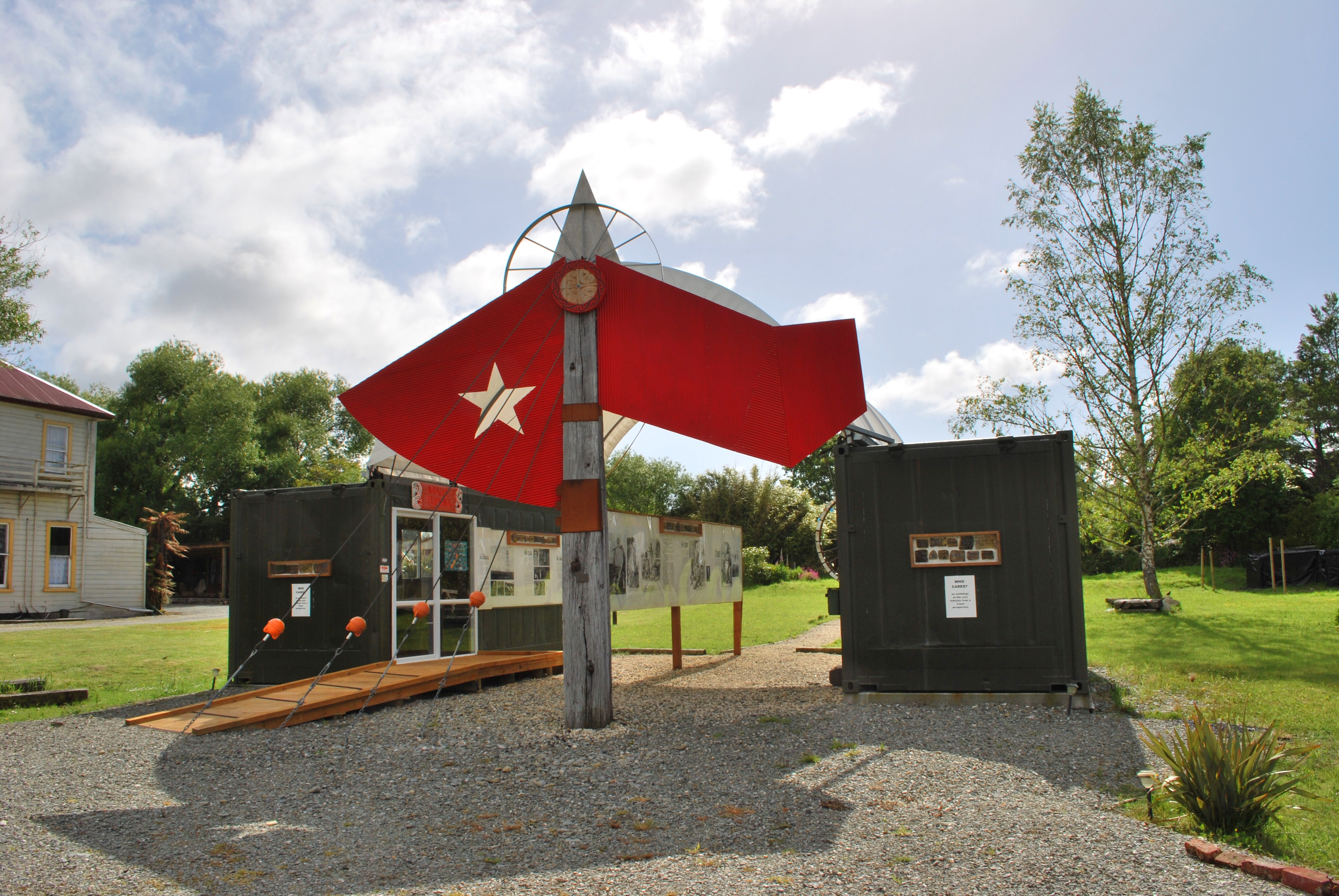
- Blackball Miners Strike Memorial
- Interactive map of Blackball
- Coordinates: 42°22′0″S 171°24′46″E
- Country: New Zealand
- Region: West Coast
- District: Grey District
- Ward: Eastern
- Electorates: West Coast-Tasman; Te Tai Tonga

Government
  - Territorial authority: Grey District Council
  - Regional council: West Coast Regional Council
  - Mayor of Grey: Tania Gibson
  - West Coast-Tasman MP: Katie Milne
  - Te Tai Tonga MP: Mananui Ramsden

Area
  - Total: 1.94 km^{2} (0.75 sq mi)

Population (June 2025)
  - Total: 310
  - Density: 160/km^{2} (410/sq mi)
- Local iwi: Ngāi Tahu

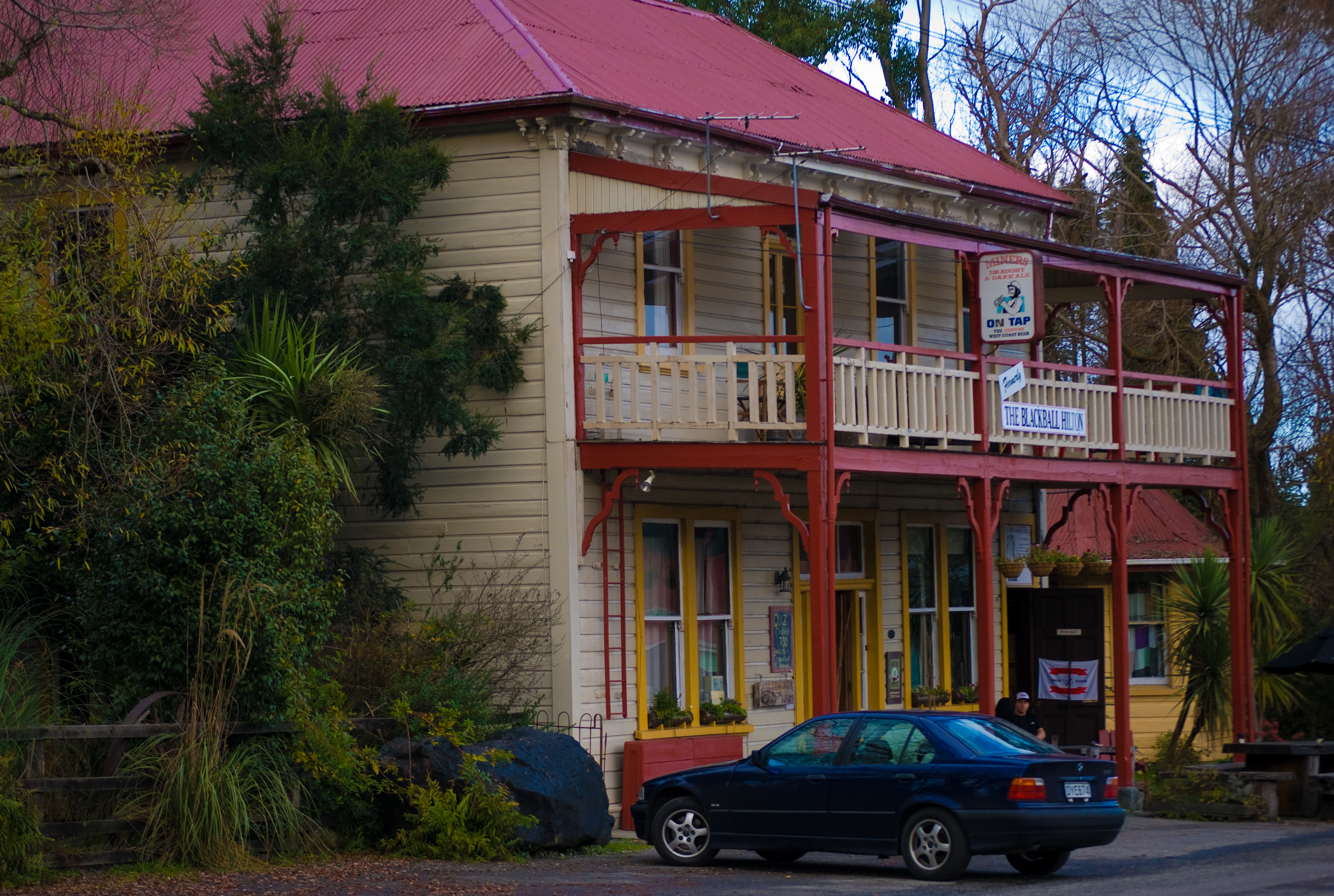
The hotel known as "Formerly the Blackball Hilton"

Blackball is a small town on the West Coast of the South Island of New Zealand, approximately 29 km from Greymouth. Elevation is approximately 100 metres.

Blackball was a centre of New Zealand radicalism and workers' militancy. It is credited as the birthplace of (the predecessors of) the New Zealand Labour Party, which followed the 1908 miners 'cribtime' strike, at ten weeks the longest in New Zealand history. In the 1913 Great Strike, Blackball miners were the last to return to work, in 1914. During the strike they had picketed miners in nearby Brunner and had burnt down the secretary of the 'arbitration' (strikebreaker) union's home. In 1925 the headquarters of the Communist Party of New Zealand moved to Blackball from Wellington. The pit closed in 1964.

== History ==
The gold rush in the Moonlight district in 1864–65 heralded the birth of Blackball. In November 1865, a gold nugget was found in what was later called Blackball Creek but it was not until 1866 that gold in payable quantities was found in upper Blackball Creek. At the time, this area was known as Garden Gully but as gold continued to be found, it became known as Croesus.

Blackball was founded in 1893 following the establishment of a nearby mine. The town was named after the Black Ball Shipping Line, which leased land in the area to mine for coal.

As the number of gold miners continued to increase, the difficulties of supplying them with food multiplied. The Plateau (later to be known as Blackball) was used as an over-night stop in the two-day journey from Greymouth. Huts and small store sheds gradually formed a small township which became known as Blackball.

The Blackball lodge of the United Ancient Order of Druids was formed originally in 1906 and like most other organisations of its day has ceased to exist in Blackball.

In its heyday Blackball had a Lodge of the Oddfellows Order. The Oddfellows Hall was a major centre of community activity and social life. On 7 June 1941 the Blackball Lodge No 80 of the Royal Antediluvian Order of Buffaloes was opened in the Oddfellows Lodge Hall.

Blackball Workingmen's Club is one of the few old community organisations left in the town. Both the Oddfellows Lodge and the Buffaloes Lodge closed long ago.

By 1964 the mine had closed.

Since 2018 a community-led programme has been restoring Blackball's heritage.The programme has received $1.9 million from the Department of Internal Affairs to help carry out this work. This involved the restoration of a coal mine chimney and a 5.5 km (3.4 mi) aerial ropeway used to transport coal.

== Demographics ==
Blackball is described by Stats NZ as a rural settlement and covers 1.94 km^{2} (0.75 sq mi). It had an estimated population of 310 as of June 2025, with a population density of 160 people per km^{2}. Blackball is part of the larger Barrytown statistical area.

Historical population
Year	Pop.	±% p.a.
2006	315	—
2013	276	−1.87%
2018	276	+0.00%
2023	300	+1.68%

Blackball had a population of 300 in the 2023 New Zealand census, an increase of 24 people (8.7%) since the 2018 census, and an increase of 24 people (8.7%) since the 2013 census. There were 165 males and 132 females in 147 dwellings. 3.0% of people identified as LGBTIQ+. The median age was 56.0 years (compared with 38.1 years nationally). There were 27 people (9.0%) aged under 15 years, 36 (12.0%) aged 15 to 29, 165 (55.0%) aged 30 to 64, and 72 (24.0%) aged 65 or older.

People could identify as more than one ethnicity. The results were 90.0% European (Pākehā); 12.0% Māori; 2.0% Pasifika; 3.0% Asian; 1.0% Middle Eastern, Latin American and African New Zealanders (MELAA); and 6.0% other, which includes people giving their ethnicity as "New Zealander". English was spoken by 99.0%, Māori by 2.0%, Samoan by 1.0%, and other languages by 4.0%. No language could be spoken by 1.0% (e.g. too young to talk). New Zealand Sign Language was known by 3.0%. The percentage of people born overseas was 12.0, compared with 28.8% nationally.

Religious affiliations were 23.0% Christian, 1.0% Buddhist, 3.0% New Age, and 3.0% other religions. People who answered that they had no religion were 56.0%, and 13.0% of people did not answer the census question.

Of those at least 15 years old, 21 (7.7%) people had a bachelor's or higher degree, 147 (53.8%) had a post-high school certificate or diploma, and 93 (34.1%) people exclusively held high school qualifications. The median income was $27,100, compared with $41,500 nationally. 6 people (2.2%) earned over $100,000 compared to 12.1% nationally. The employment status of those at least 15 was 102 (37.4%) full-time, 48 (17.6%) part-time, and 9 (3.3%) unemployed.

== Education ==
A school opened in Blackball in 1895. It was replaced by a new school in 1931, which celebrated its centenary in 1995. Paparoa Range School, based at Dobson, has a classroom at Blackball.

== Railway ==
Blackball was the terminus of the New Zealand Railways Department's Blackball Branch, a branch line from the Stillwater–Westport Line. The line was approved in 1901, construction began in 1902 under the auspices of the Public Works Department, trains first ran in 1909, and it was officially opened on 1 August 1910. Private interests constructed a steep extension from Blackball into the Paparoa Ranges that employed the Fell mountain railway system to aid braking. This extension was later taken over by the State Mines Department and was known as the Roa Incline.

Passenger services operated to Blackball until 1940, primarily for the benefit of miners. Coal was the mainstay of the railway, and when tonnages dropped to an unsustainable level the Roa Incline closed on 25 July 1960. Trains to Blackball became increasingly infrequent, and when a flood destroyed two spans of the line's bridge over the Grey River on 21 February 1966, the Railways Department viewed repairs as unjustifiably expensive and closed the line. Blackball's station building had been destroyed by fire in 1955.

== Notable places ==
Blackball is home to five historic places registered with Heritage New Zealand: The Blackball coal mine chimneys, registered as category 1; the Blackball mine return air vent and fan chamber, registered as category 1; Formerly The Blackball Hilton, a hotel which changed its name from The Blackbill Hilton following threats of legal action from the Hilton Hotels & Resorts company, registered as category 2; the Blackball Community Centre, registered as category 2; and the Miners Bath House, registered as category 2.

The Blackball Museum of Working Class History opened in the town on 1 May 2010, in order to "celebrate the role working people have played in creating the infrastructure and wealth of a nation, [and] the part working people have played in creating society".

== Literature ==
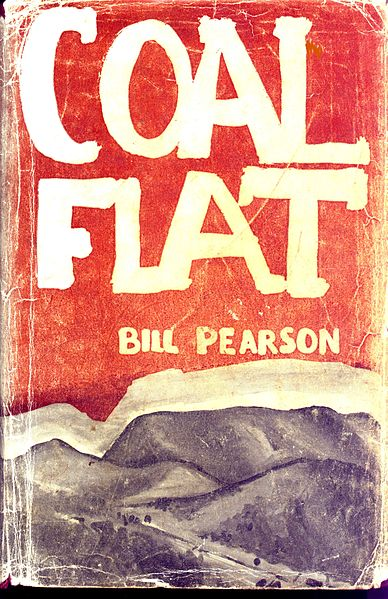
Cover of Bill Pearson's 1963 novel, Coal Flat.

Blackball has a unique literary inheritance: for a small town, it has managed to attract more than its share of literary representations. Bill Pearson's Coal Flat (1963) is a major New Zealand novel in the dated social realist tradition. Pearson had taught in the town as a probationary teacher in 1942, and had formed a friendship with the publican's family. His book caused some consternation amongst the local people, as they tried to "spot the character" and identify who Pearson had based his characters on. Pearson died in 2002.

Eric Beardsley's Blackball '08 is an historical novel published in 1984. Beardsley used the historic 1908 Crib Time strike as the basis for a story that fleshed out the drama of what was a key moment in New Zealand trade union history. He published his biography Sliding down the Hypotenuse in 2011.

Jeffrey Paparoa Holman wrote The Late Great Blackball Bridge Sonnets, a collection of poetry published in 2004, which contains poems based around the railway bridge that linked the community with the outside world. The poems also mention people and features of the town, which Holman recalls from his childhood in Blackball during the 1950s and 1960s.

Paul Maunder, who lives in the town, is a playwright who has written and staged a number of plays about the town and working-class history.

Stevan Eldred-Grigg, who spent the first six years of his life in the town and now lives there once more, is a novelist and historian who has recently published a memoir about family life in 1950s Blackball.
