= Paparoa Range =

Mountain range in New Zealand

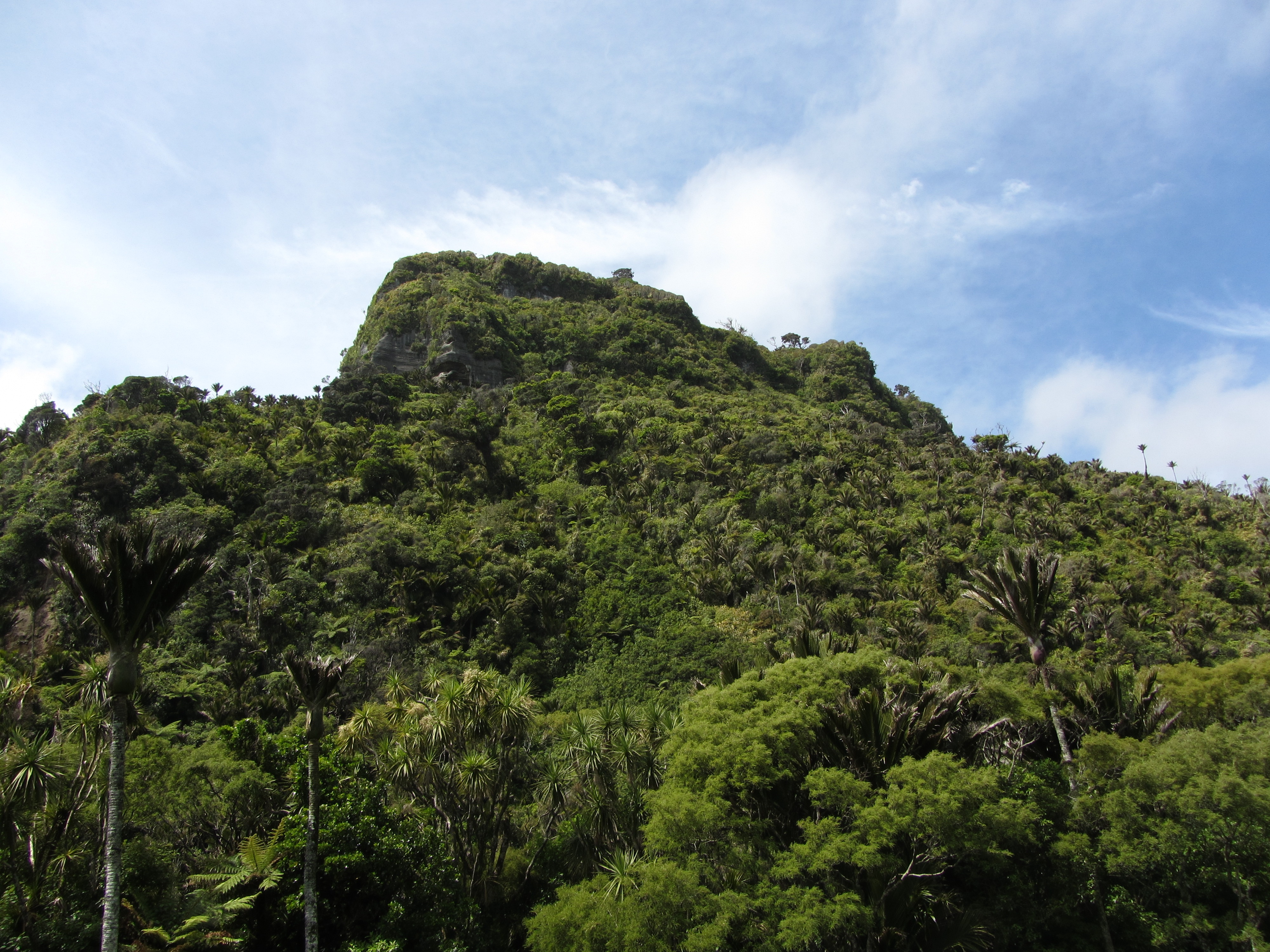
- Paparoa Range

Highest point
- Peak: Mount Uriah
- Elevation: 1,525 m (5,003 ft)
- Coordinates: 42°01′08″S 171°38′35″E

Dimensions
- Length: 70 km (43 mi)

Naming
- Etymology: Named by Ngāti Wairangi, translated as "the broad back" or "the rocky ridge"
- Native name: Te Paparoa (Māori)

Geography
- Location within New Zealand
- Range coordinates: 42°0′S 171°35′E

The Paparoa Range is a mountain range in the West Coast region of New Zealand's South Island. It was the first New Zealand land seen by a European – Abel Tasman in 1642. Part of the range has the country's highest protection as a national park; the Paparoa National Park was established in 1987. Within that park, the Cave Creek disaster occurred in 1995.

== History ==
The Dutch explorer Abel Tasman was the first (known) European to come to New Zealand (Aotearoa), which he named Staten Landt, and he first encountered it on 13 December 1642. Tasman had 110 men under his command and was travelling with two ships, the Heemskerck and the Zeehaen. It is believed that the ships were off Punakaiki and if so, it was the Paparoa Range that they saw.

Significant coal deposits have been found in the Paparoa Range, with the Blackball Branch/Roa Incline and the Rewanui Branch railways built to provide access to the mines. Although these branch lines are now closed, they were famous for their usage of the Fell mountain railway system to aid braking for trains descending the Inclines (though this was not a full use of the Fell system like the North Island's Rimutaka Incline).

Some of the range is protected as the Paparoa National Park, which was established in 1987. Within this park, the 1995 Cave Creek disaster occurred.

Two Grey Valley residents, Trevor Johnston and Kevin Dash, became the first people to traverse the length of the Paparoa Ranges from north to south in mid-1986. They later wrote a book about the experience, Touch the Wilderness.

== Flora and fauna ==
Numerous species of flora and fauna are found in the Paparoa Range, as well as lower slopes and valleys below. One of the significant understory elements of the floral palette is the fern Blechnum discolor.

== Geography ==
It is located along the coast between the Buller and Grey Rivers, with the Inangahua River to the east. The highest peak in the Paparoa Range is Mount Uriah at 1,525 m (5,003 ft), and a number of other peaks are higher than 1,200 m (3,900 ft). The Papahaua Range north of the Buller Gorge is a geological continuation of the Paparoa Range. The southern part of the range is located in Grey District and the northern part in Buller District. Some of the peaks are on the boundary of the two districts.

== Named peaks ==
Many of the named peaks commemorate scientists, with this theme started by Julius von Haast. These include the Buckland Peaks (named after William Buckland), Mount Faraday (Michael Faraday; named by von Haast), Mount Curie (Marie Curie), Mount Mendel (Gregor Mendel), Mount Pasteur (Louis Pasteur), Mount Einstein (Albert Einstein), Mount Rutherford (Ernest Rutherford), Mount Euclid (Euclid), Mount Fleming (Alexander Fleming), Mount Lavoisier (Antoine Lavoisier), Mount Kelvin (William Thomson, 1st Baron Kelvin; named by the botanist William Trownson), Mount Copernicus (Nicolaus Copernicus), Mount Galileo (Galileo Galilei) and Mount Davy (Humphry Davy; named by von Haast).
