= Bullock Creek (New Zealand) =

Creek in New Zealand

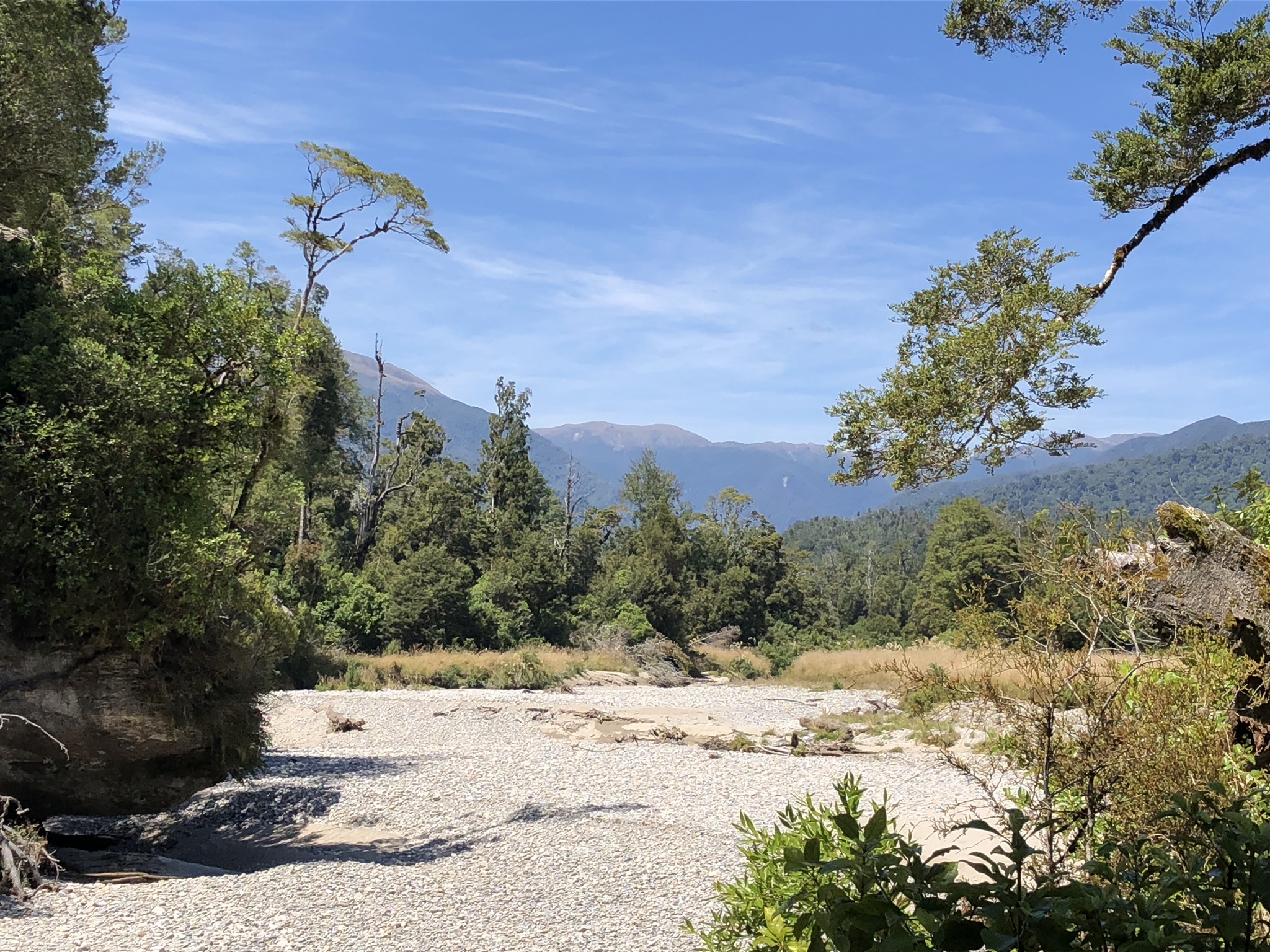
- View towards the polje area
- Route of the Bullock Creek
- Mouth of the Bullock Creek Bullock Creek (New Zealand) (New Zealand)
- Native name: Punungairo (Māori)

Location
- Country: New Zealand
- Region: West Coast
- District: Buller

Physical characteristics
- Source: Paparoa Range
  - coordinates: 42.1235°S 171.5225°E
- Mouth: Pororari Lagoon
  - coordinates: 42°06′02″S 171°20′26″E
  - elevation: 4 m (13 ft)

Basin features
- Progression: Bullock Creek → Pororari Lagoon → Tasman Sea
- Tributaries
  - right: Bovis Creek
- Waterbodies: Taurus major submergence

Bullock Creek or Punungairo is a river valley in the Paparoa National Park, located just north of Punakaiki on the West Coast of New Zealand. It includes a rare and nationally significant polje, a large, flat-floored depression within karst limestone. The Bullock Creek polje is New Zealand's only example of this type of landform.

== Access ==
Bullock Creek Road leaves State Highway 6 around 2 kilometres (1.2 mi) north of the visitor centre at Punakaiki. It is a 6 kilometres (3.7 mi) long gravel road that provides access to the polje area and to the mid-point of the Inland Pack Track. The road is prone to flooding and washouts during heavy rain. The end of Bullock Creek Road also provides access to the walking track to Cave Creek / Kotihotiho. Cave Creek is most known for the 1995 Cave Creek disaster, in which 14 people died following the collapse of a viewing platform.

== Geography ==
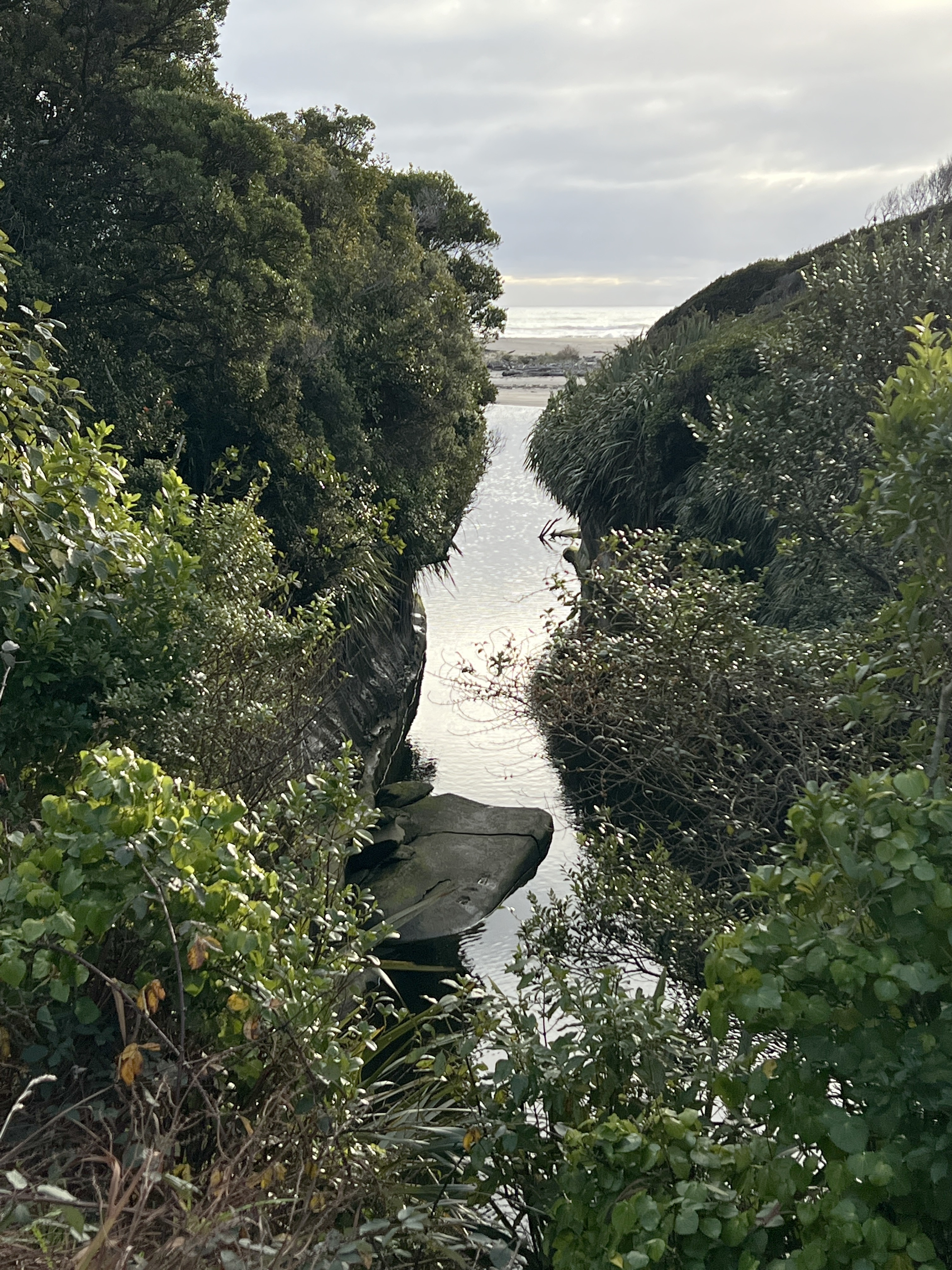
The mouth of the Bullock Creek as it enters the Pororari Lagoon

The tributaries of Bullock Creek, Pororari River to the south, and Fox River to the north all drain from high up on the Paparoa Range. However, comparison of the longitudinal profile of elevation of Bullock Creek with that of Pororari River and Fox River shows a marked difference. Bullock Creek rises steeply between 2 and 4 km in from the coast. A landslide has impounded the flow of the river and caused alluvium to build up, raising the elevation by 60 m. This has increased the hydraulic gradient from Bullock Creek to the Pororari River leading to increased subterranean flows. The entire flow of Bullock Creek can sink underground at the Taurus Major submergence, close to the end of the Bullock Creek road. The water flows 1.5 km underground to a resurgence in the Cave Creek canyon. The underground flows are an example of river capture. The flow of water underground from Bullock Creek to Cave Creek was demonstrated in 1974 with a fluorescein dye test proving the connection.

=== Caves ===
There are many caves in the Bullock Creek area, formed as a result of karst erosion. The main Bullock Creek caves (named Telluris and Winding Staircase) are former submergence caves of Bullock Creek and are part of a larger system named Xanadu. In dry conditions, Bullock Creek submerges entirely at the Taurus Major Submergence, where the stream meets limestone on the west side of the Punakaiki syncline. In flood conditions, the river overflows at the first submergence and then floods a series of smaller submergences further down the valley. Many of the caves are flooded during and after heavy rain.

=== The polje ===
Bullock Creek includes a rare and nationally significant polje, a large enclosed depression with steep sides and a flat floor, caused by subsidence in a karst region. The Bullock Creek polje is New Zealand's only example of this type of landform. In its West Coast Conservation Management Strategy 2010–2020, the Department of Conservation stated that a desired outcome would be for the Bullock Creek polje to become a wetland designated under the Ramsar Convention.

== History ==
Early settlers moved into the polje area in 1874 and began felling the forest and clearing native wetland vegetation to plant pasture for grazing. A series of drains were constructed across the wetland, and by around 1900 there was only 100 hectares (250 acres) of wetland vegetation remaining. The entire area is prone to inundation in heavy rainfall, as water from underground passages overflows and re-emerges at the surface. Despite the construction of the drains, the area remained very wet. Dairy farming in the area continued beyond the 1960s, and a Field Day was held onsite on 25 June 1969 for farmers from the Grey Valley Farm Improvement Club. However, in 1986, when farming was no longer economic, the area was transferred into public ownership as conservation land.

In April 2014, Cyclone Ita brought very strong winds to the West Coast along with heavy rain. The storm caused widespread damage and led to the closure of parts of the Inland Pack Track for two years. In 2016, the section of the track between Fox River and Bullock Creek was re-opened after the clearance of around 400 fallen trees.

== Conservation ==
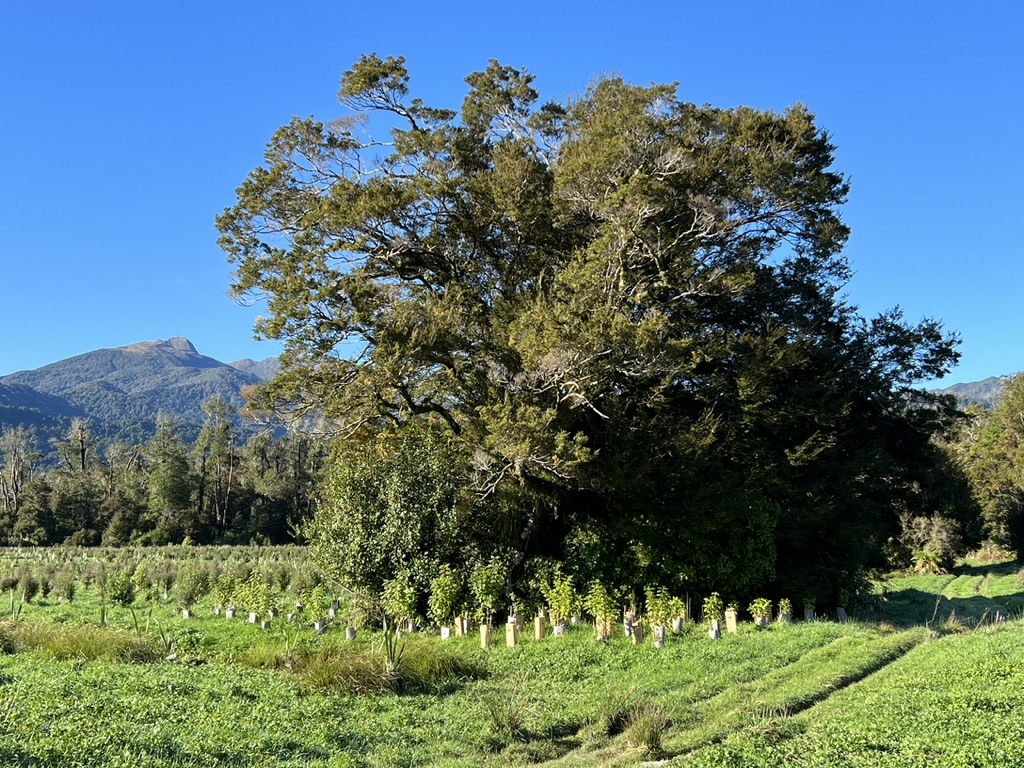
Restoration planting by Conservation Volunteers New Zealand around a remnant beech tree

In 2020, the Minister of Conservation, Kiri Allan announced projects in Paparoa National Park that included conserving the Bullock Creek polje. The work was to be led by Conservation Volunteers New Zealand and the Department of Conservation. Planting in the area began in 2020, with support from Te Uru Rākau, the One Billion Trees programme.

The Bullock Creek Farm Conservation Area is surrounded by Paparoa National Park, but as at 2022 is not part of the National Park. The Conservation Area includes the Kotihotiho/Cave Creek resurgence and Punungairo/Bullock Creek polje. The Paparoa National Park Management Plan 2017 describes the possibility of adding this unique area to the Park to protect its values.

== Rock climbing ==
The Bullock Creek valley has become a popular location for sport climbing, with 88 routes as at 2022. The first routes were developed in 1985–86, but larger scale development did not occur until 2014. The crags are mostly north-facing, and accessed from the true left of Bullock Creek. Some names given to popular crags include: The Aboretum, The Coloseum and Hanging Gardens.

== Gallery ==
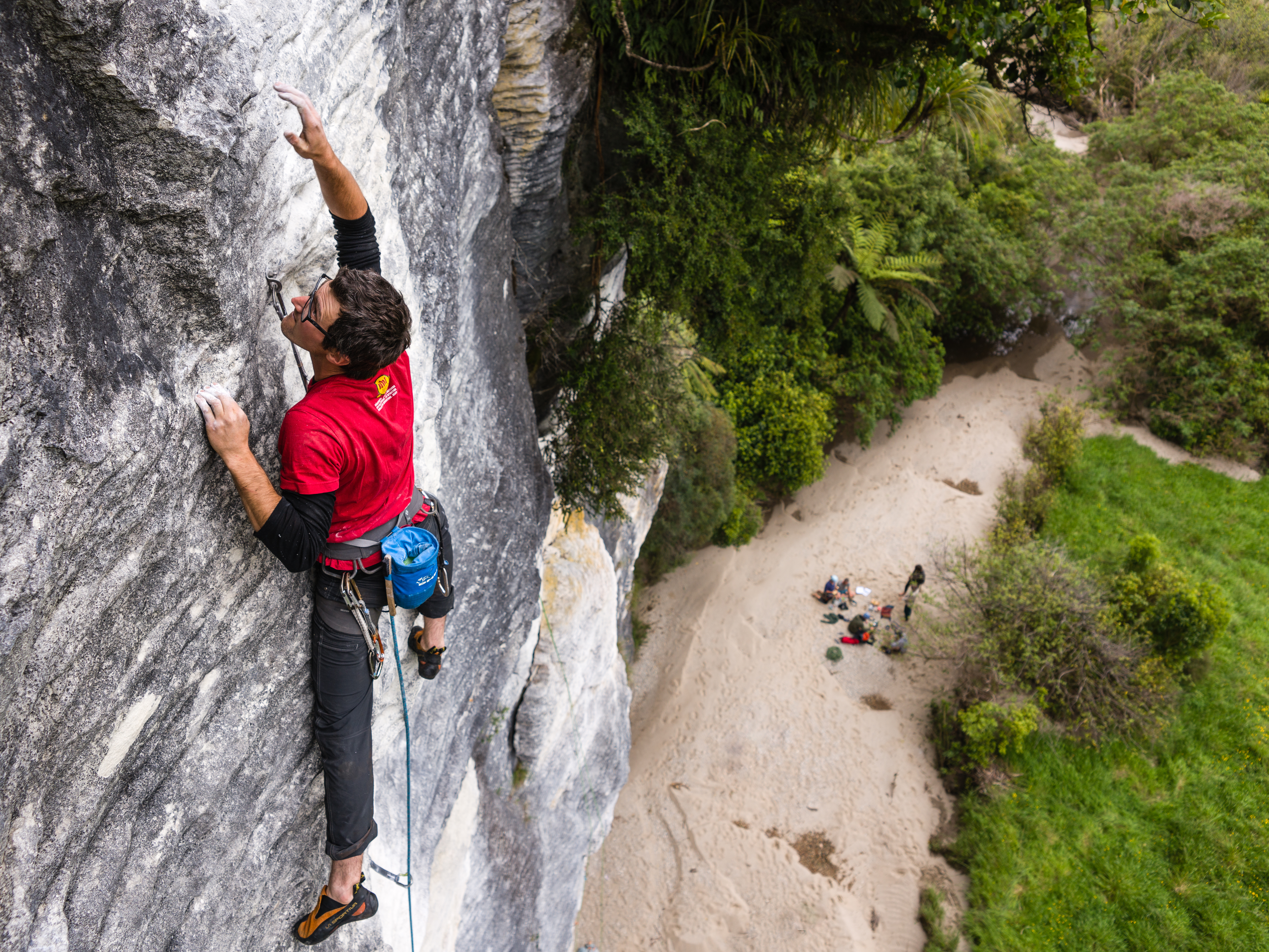
Climbing at Hanging Gardens, Bullock Creek, Paparoa National Park

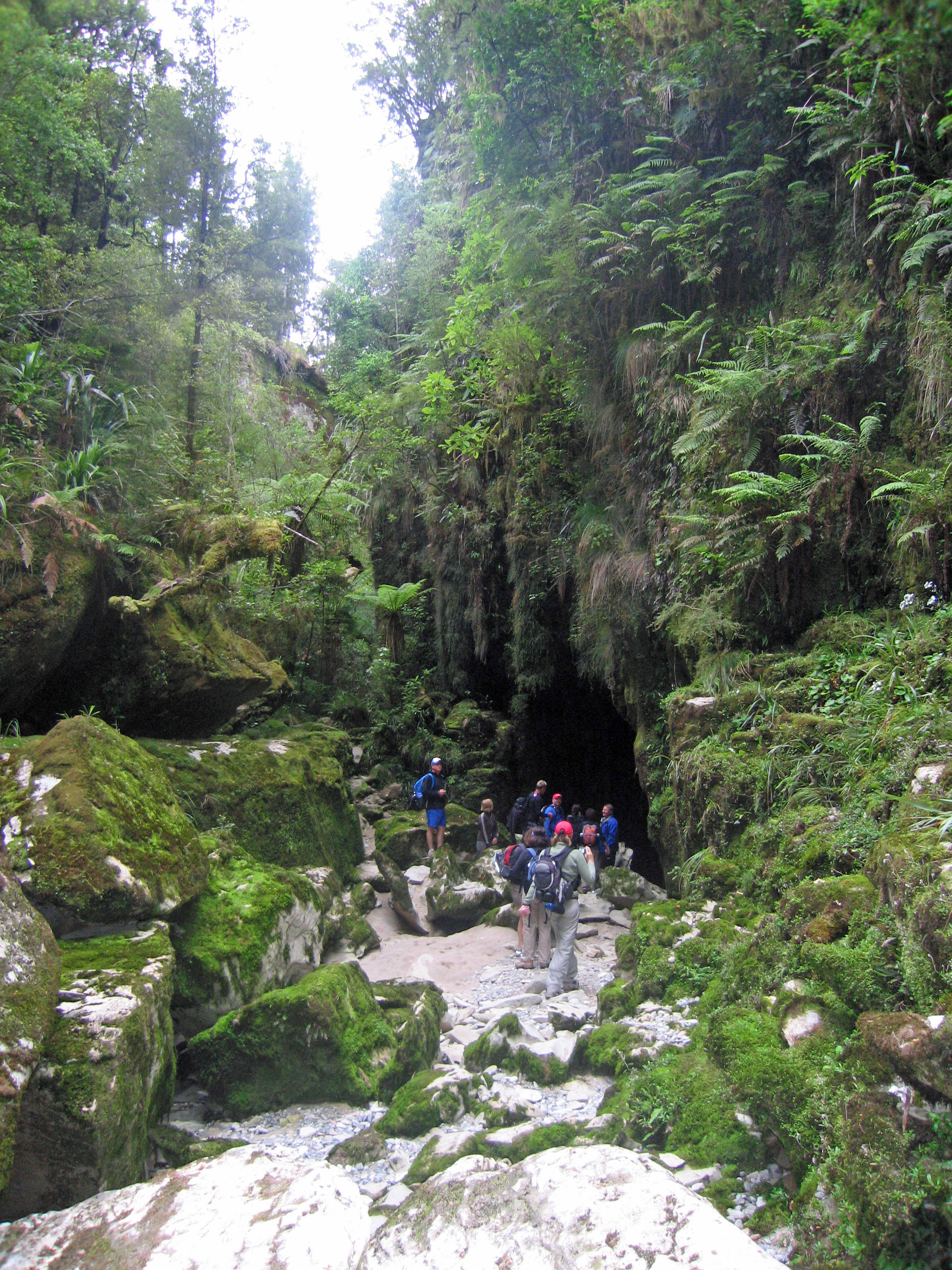
Caving group at Bullock Creek

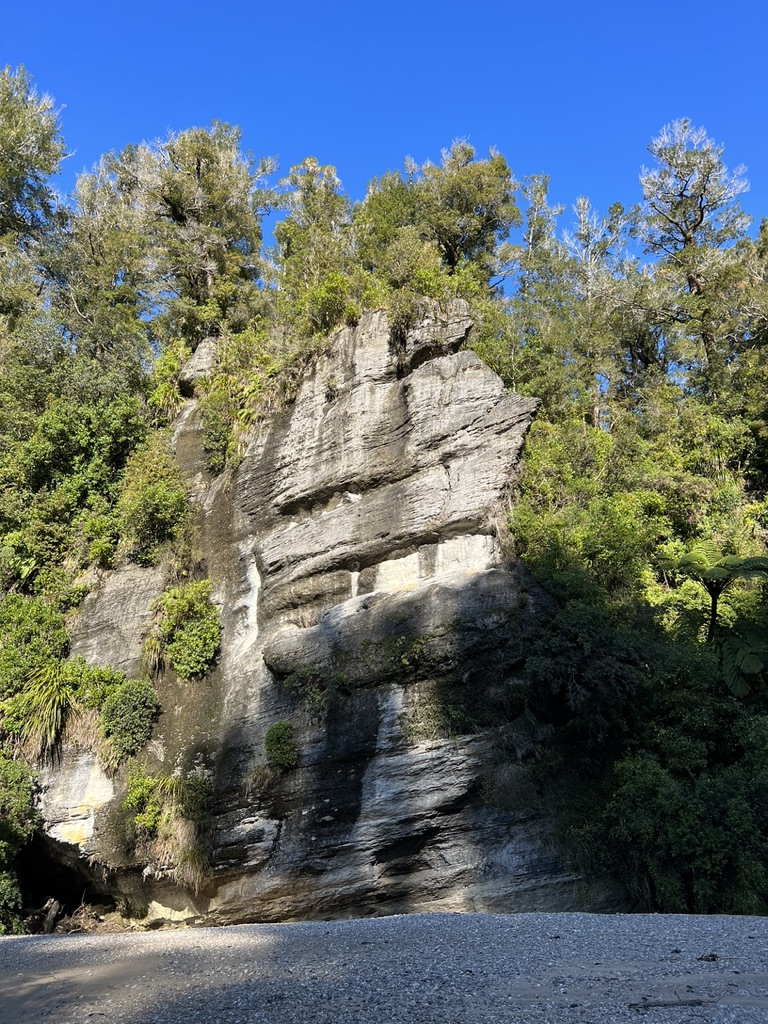
Limestone bluffs along the Bullock Creek

== See also ==
Lake Disappear (Waikato polje)
