= Mummery =

Mummery may refer to:

== Carnivals ==
- Christmas Mummering
- Performance of a Mummers' play.
- Mummers Parade

== Other ==
- Mummery (surname)
- Mount Mummery
- Mummery Cliff
- Mummery tent
- Mummer (disambiguation)
