= Ballroom Overhang =

Limestone outcrop in New Zealand

- Limestone
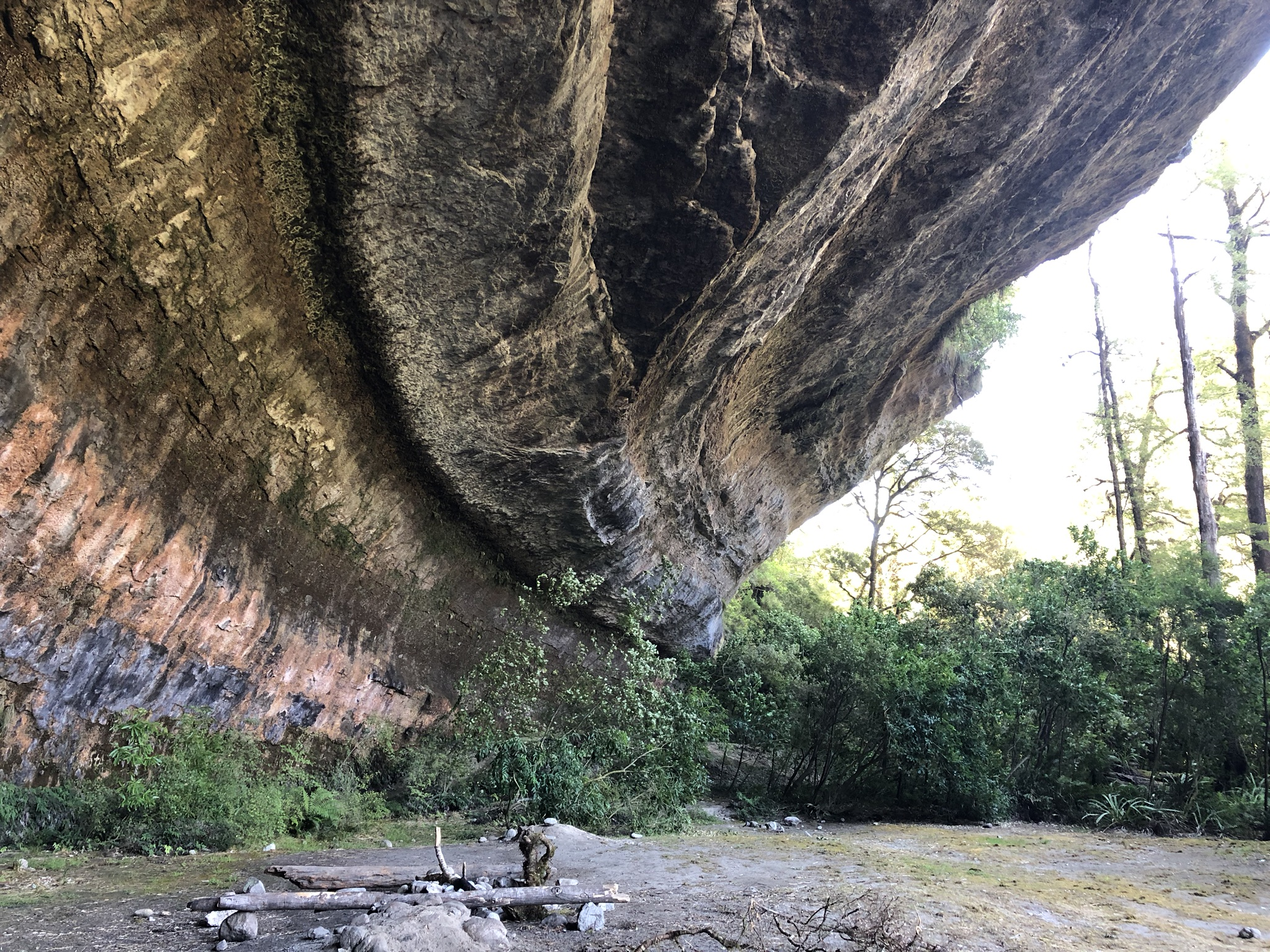

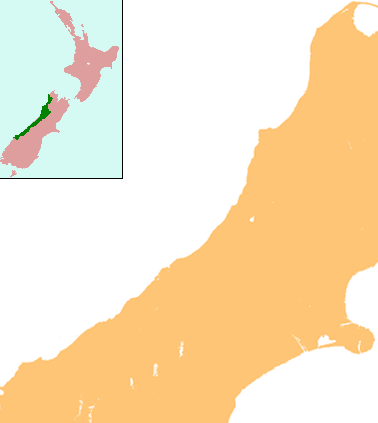
- Coordinates: 42°02′36″S 171°26′37″E
- Location: Paparoa National Park
- Elevation: 100 m
- Topo map: BS19, BS20

The Ballroom Overhang is a large limestone outcrop on the Fox River in Paparoa National Park, in the Buller District of New Zealand. The Ballroom Overhang provides a sheltered place for resting or overnight camping. The overhang is 10 m (33 ft) at its highest point, 100 m (330 ft) long, and 30 m (98 ft) at its widest point.

In suitable conditions, the 12 kilometres (7.5 mi) hike to the Ballroom Overhang and back can be made as return day trip from the coast road. However, it involves multiple river crossings, and these are likely to be impassable during or after heavy rain. The route to the Ballroom Overhang is classified as an advanced tramping track by the Department of Conservation. The Ballroom Overhang can be reached from the Inland Pack Track, and is approximately 500 metres (1,600 ft) upstream from the junction of Fox River and Dilemma Creek. This part of the route requires several river crossings.
