= Aronson Corner =

Aronson Corner (80°29′S 20°56′W) is the cliffed extremity of a snow-capped ridge between Mummery Cliff and Chevreul Cliffs in Pioneers Escarpment, Shackleton Range. It was photographed from the air by the U.S. Navy, 1967, and surveyed by the British Antarctic Survey, 1968–71. In association with the names of pioneers of polar life and travel, it was named by the United Kingdom Antarctic Place-Names Committee after Louis V. Aronson, American founder of the Ronson Corporation, who in about 1910 developed the first practical petrol lighter, known originally as the "trench match."
