= Crown Organisations (Criminal Liability) Act 2002 =

Act of Parliament in New Zealand

New Zealand Parliament
- Royal assent: 17 October 2002
- Commenced: 18 October 2002
- Administered by: Minister of Justice

Legislative history
- Bill title: Crown Organisations (Criminal Liability) Bill
- Introduced by: Phil Goff
- First reading: 3 May 2001
- Passed: 9 December 2004
- Status: Current legislation

The Crown Organisations (Criminal Liability) Act 2002 is an Act of Parliament in New Zealand. It was passed into law on 8 October 2002 in the Parliament of New Zealand. The Act changed the existing law to enable Crown organisations - Crown entities, government departments, or government-related organisations - to be prosecuted for offences under the Building Act and the Health and Safety in Employment Act 1992. While Crown organisations were required to comply with both pieces of legislation since their enactment, it was not previously possible to prosecute those organisations for offences committed under either Act.

The Act is designed "to protect society and the individual from harm or danger arising from actions of the Crown by ensuring that there are mechanisms to hold the Crown responsible and accountable for its actions [and to] meet the principle that the Crown should in general be subject to the law and the same legal processes as anyone else." It is administered by the Ministry of Justice.

== Background ==
The Act was created in response to a Commission of Inquiry into the Cave Creek disaster, headed by District Judge Graeme S. Noble. Cave Creek is a small stream in Paparoa National Park. A viewing platform was erected by the Department of Conservation (DOC) in April 1994, which looked out over a 30-metre chasm with a view of where the creek emerges from a cave system below. The commission discovered that the cantilevered platform had been constructed by well-intentioned but unqualified volunteers without on-site plans or formal building approval. The platform was highly unsafe, especially with large numbers of people on it. On 28 April 1995 the platform collapsed, resulting in the deaths of 14 people. Although DOC took responsibility for the accident, there were no prosecutions due to a loophole in New Zealand law that prevented government departments from being held liable in such a situation. In his report Judge Noble recommended that the Crown's exemptions from the Building Act and the Health and Safety in Employment Act should both be removed.
