= Mountain Education Centre of New Zealand =

Former education centre in New Zealand

The Mountain Education Centre of New Zealand (MECNZ) was formally a division of Tai Poutini Polytechnic, located in Wānaka, New Zealand. Tai Poutini Polytechnic continues to run the Ski Patrol Programme from its Wānaka Campus.

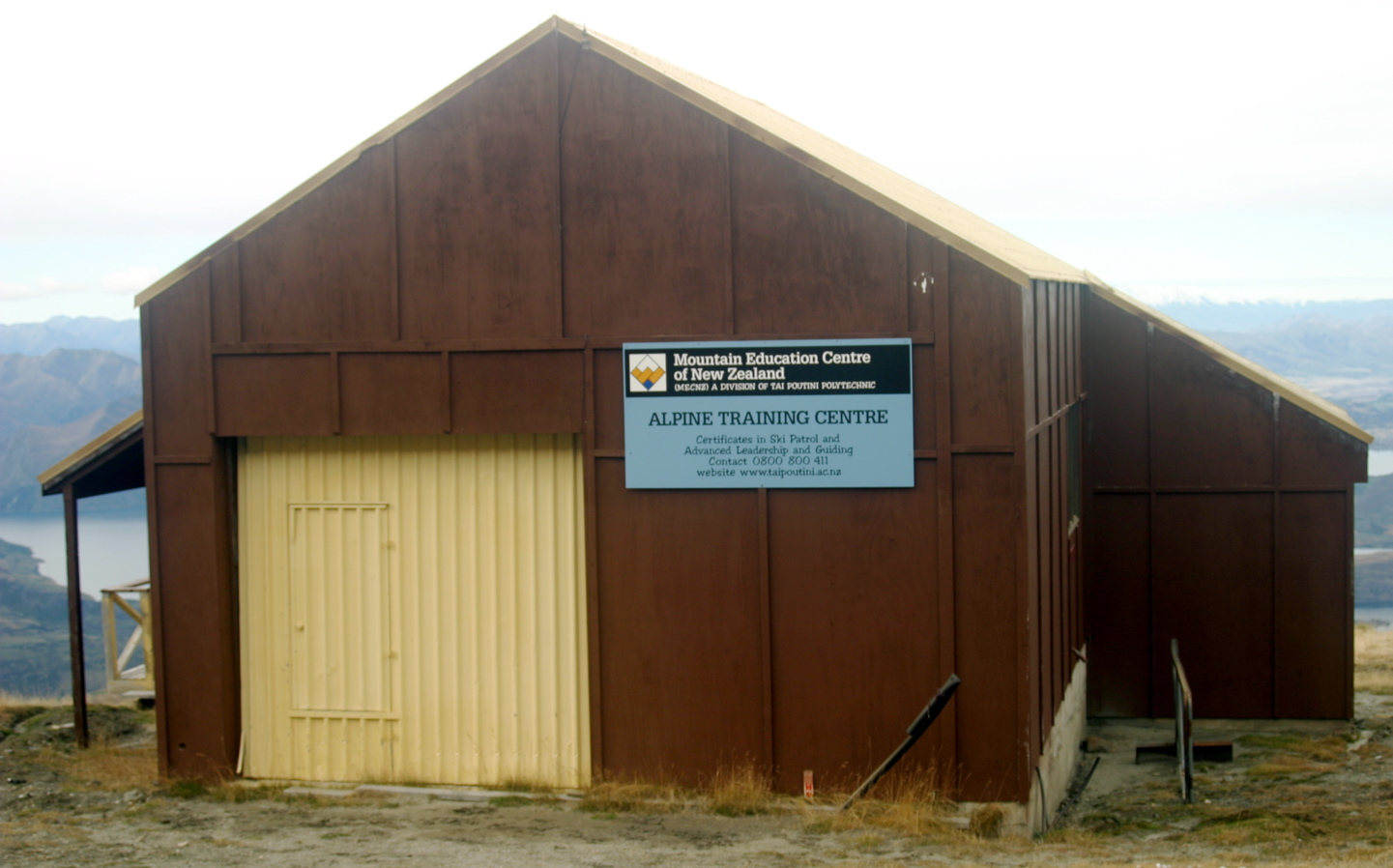
The day lodge facilities for students on the ski patrol course.

== Certificate in Ski Patrol ==
The Ski Patrol programme is delivered by Tai Poutini Polytechnic located in Wānaka. A ‘classroom’ is also located at Wānaka Treble Cone snowsports area and during the winter season students spend much of the time learning in a snow environment.

This Level 3 Ski Patrol programme begins its practical units in Wānaka in mid February, and runs until late September. An additional three weeks of distance learning forms the initial part of the programme.

Core elements of this programme include:

- pre-hospital emergency care (first aid)
- avalanche stage 1 and back country touring
- meteorology
- advanced skiing or snowboarding
- ski patrol operations
- professional teamwork and ethics
- rescue toboggans
- basic mountaineering and rope techniques
- chair lift evacuation
- snow blasting

== Location ==
The Tai Poutini Polytechnic ski patrol programme is based in Wānaka.
