= Inland Pack Track =

New Zealand tramping track

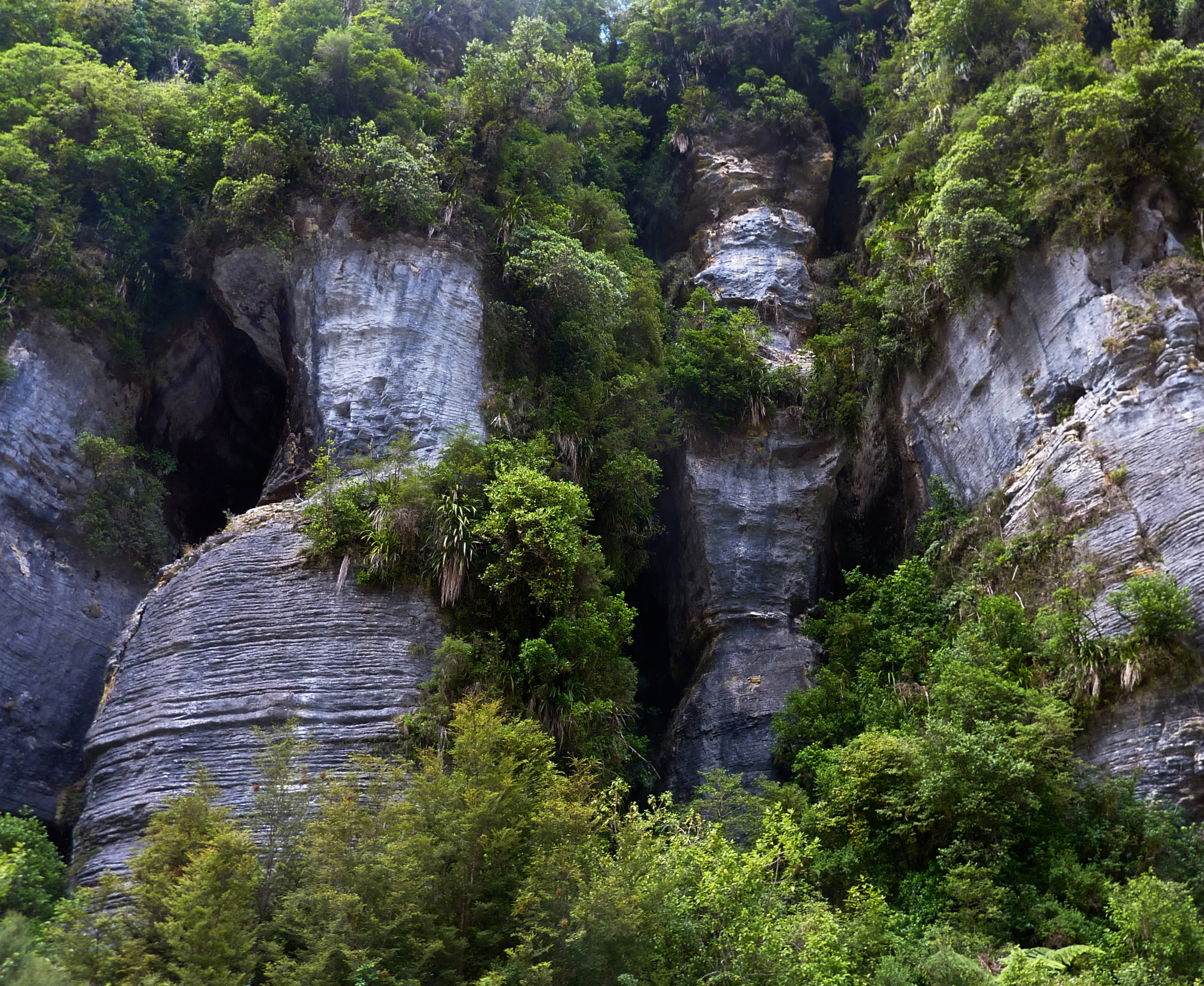
- Limestone cliffs along the Fox River (Buller)
- Length: 25 km (16 mi)
- Location: Paparoa National Park
- Trailheads: Waikori Road car park 42°07′34″S 171°20′44″E; Fox River mouth car park 42°01′53″S 171°23′06″E
- Use: Tramping; Mountain biking (part only)
- Highest point: 198 m (650 ft)
- Sights: Limestone canyons; Dense forest
- Maintained by: Department of Conservation

The Inland Pack Track is a trail in the Paparoa National Park on West Coast of New Zealand. The full length of the trail commences at the Punakaiki River in the south, and ends at the mouth of the Fox River in the north. It takes two or three days to complete the track.

== History ==
There was no formed road along the Punakaiki coast until the late 1920s. Early European explorers navigating the coast encountered sheer cliffs at Te Miko, navigable only by climbing ladders totalling 46 feet high (or so Haast estimated) made of harakeke and rotting rātā vine. Charles Heaphy noted in 1846 that "…as several of the rotten steps gave way under our feet, our position was far from being pleasant. A number of cormorants and other marine birds, too, that had their nests in the crevices of the rock were screaming and wheeling about us at the intrusion." During the gold rush of the 1860s these were replaced by chain ladders, soon known as "Jacob's Ladder", but the wooden rungs were destroyed by overuse, and travellers slid down the chains instead, or jammed sticks into the links.

The cliffs and headlands between Fox River and the Punakaiki River were the greatest obstacles to travel, and many miners died as a result of falls, or from drowning. To mitigate the on-going risks, the Nelson Provincial Council arranged for the construction of the Inland Pack Track in January-February 1867. The route was not popular with the diggers, because it involved many river crossings, it was difficult to travel along valley floors and proved time-consuming for the diggers and their laden pack horses. The track eventually fell into disrepair.

== Route ==
=== Punakaiki River to Pororari River ===
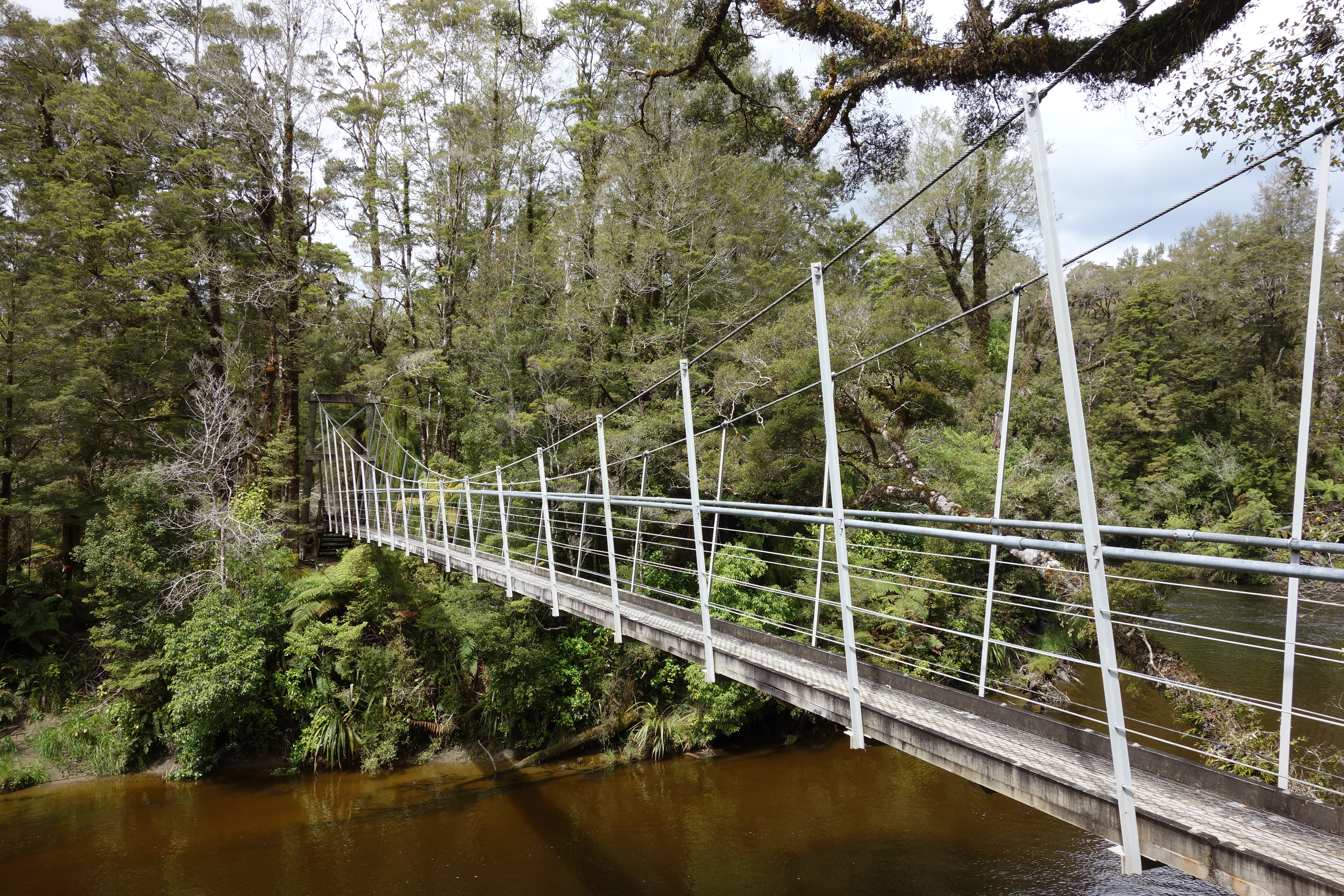
Suspension bridge over the Pororari River

The trail commences from the south at Waipori Road, where there is a suspension bridge across the Punakaiki River. The section of the trail from the Punakaiki River to the Pororari River is dual-use – shared between walkers and mountain bikers, and serves as the northern entry or exit point of the Paparoa Track. From the bridge across the Punakaiki River, the track climbs over a low saddle passing through mixed broadleaf forest before dropping into the Pororari River valley.

Walkers who take the track down the Pororari River back to Punakaiki from this point will complete the "Punakaiki loop", a round trip of about 11 kilometres (6.8 mi) that takes around 3 hours.

=== Pororari River to Bullock Creek ===
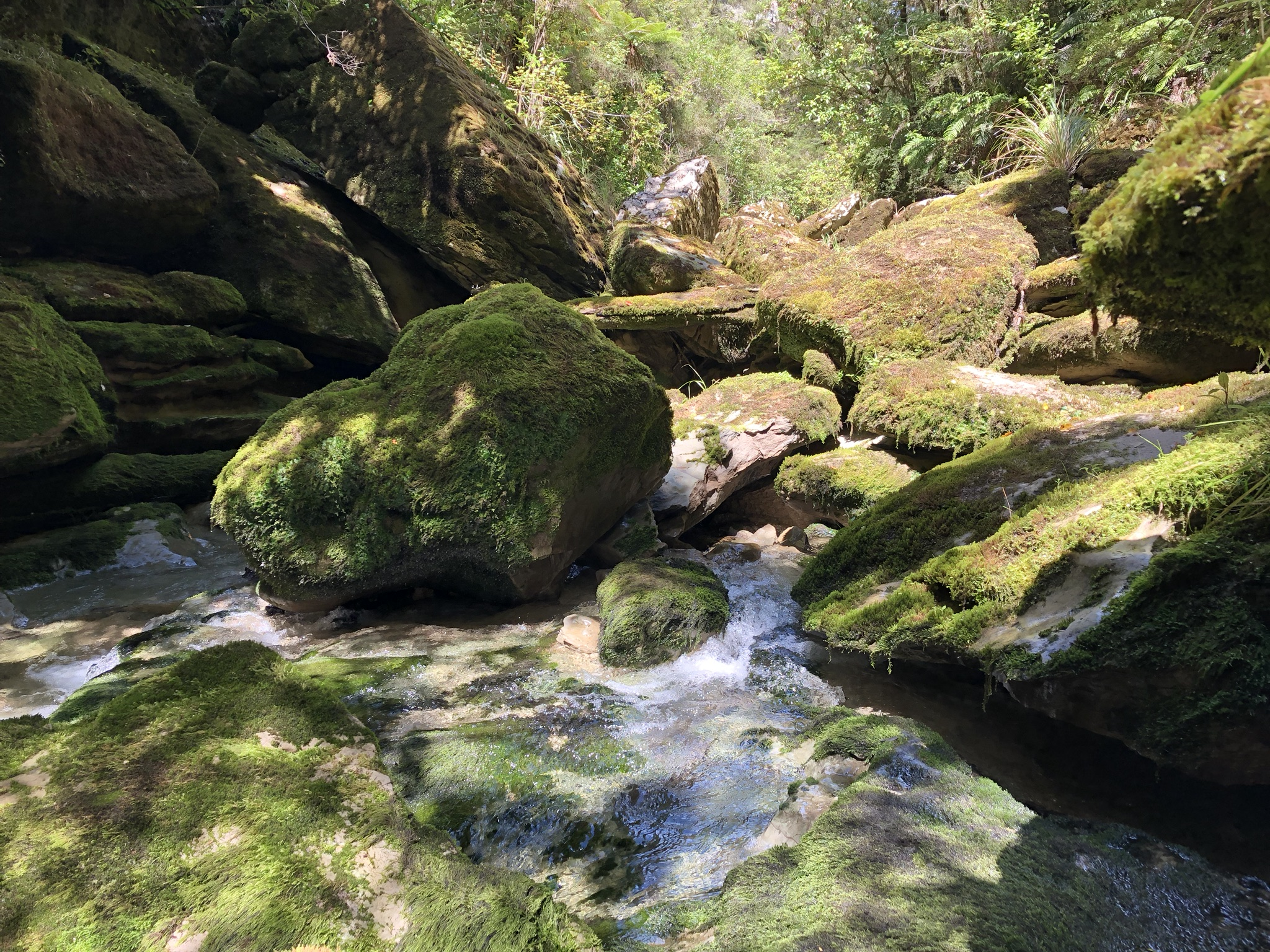
Cave Creek resurgence

From the junction of the Pororari River track and the Inland Pack Track, the route continues to the Lower Pororari Swing Bridge, where the shared-use ends. The remaining sections of the Inland Pack Track are for walkers only. The section of track to Bullock Creek was badly damaged during Cyclone Ita in 2014, with a large number of fallen trees. The storm caused widespread damage and led to the closure of parts of the Inland Pack Track for two years. Regeneration can be seen occurring in clearings left from the storm damage. The remaining part of this section of the track includes mature rimus and many ferns.

As the track approaches the flat land of the former Bullock Creek Farm, there is a side trail of 4 kilometres (2.5 mi) to Cave Creek / Kotihotiho and the resurgence. This is the site of the Cave Creek disaster in 1995 when a viewing platform above the chasm collapsed, leading to the deaths of 14 people. There is a memorial on the side of the track to those who died. This section of track was renamed the Cave Creek Memorial Track/Kotihotiho in 2020, as part of the 25 year remembrance of the disaster.

From the intersection with the Cave Creek Memorial Track, the route of the Inland Pack Track follows an old farm road to Bullock Creek. The Bullock Creek road is a 6 kilometres (3.7 mi) long gravel road that provides an exit to State Highway 6 on the coast for those not wanting to complete the full distance.

=== Bullock Creek to Fox River ===
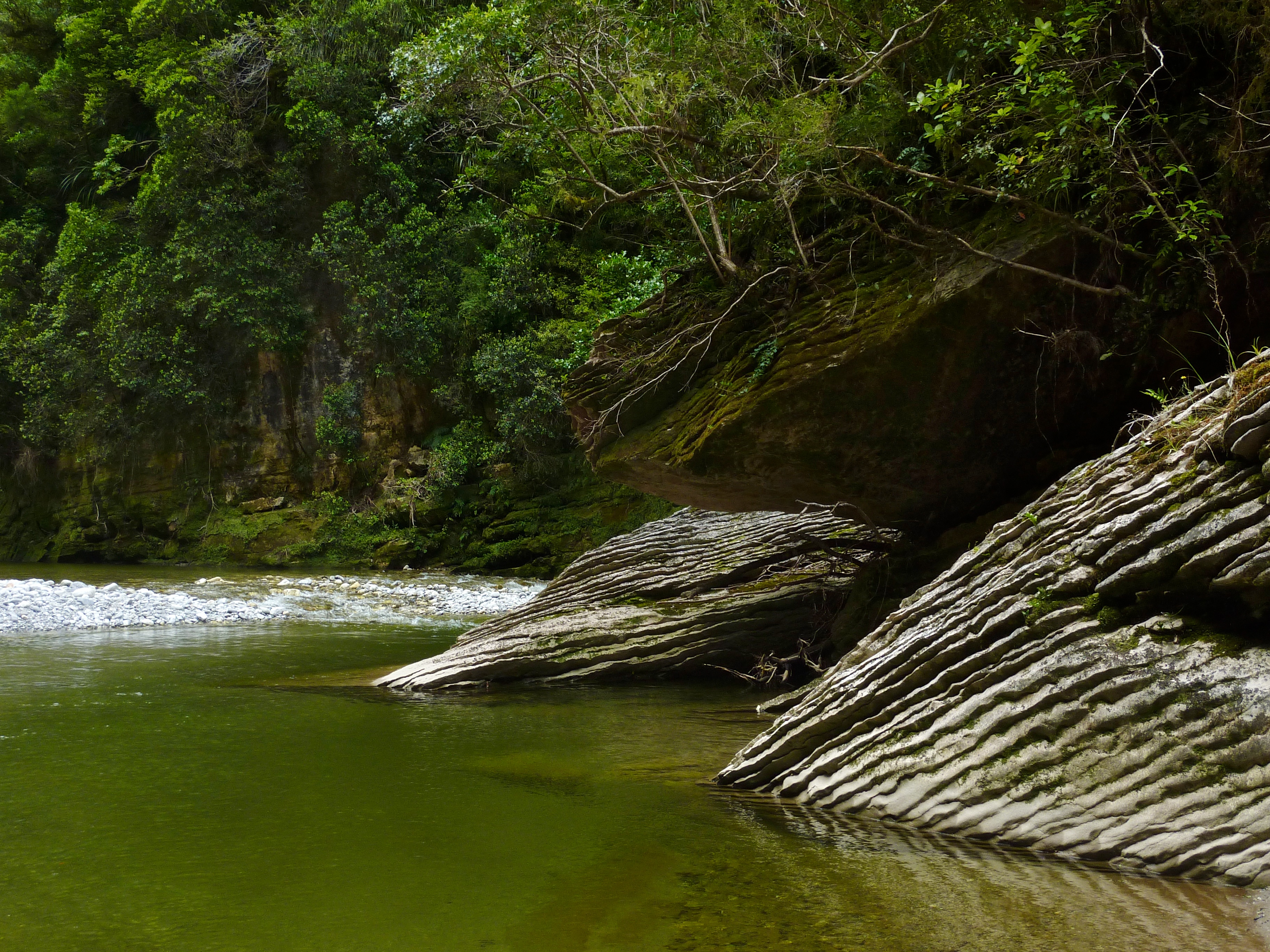
Dilemma Creek

This 11 kilometres (6.8 mi) section of track follows an old farm road before the route becomes a single track around a swamp in mixed rimu and beech forest. The trail then climbs a ridge between Bullock Creek and the catchments of the Fox River and then descends to Fossil Creek. The route follows Fossil Creek downstream, and there is no formed path. The route then goes along Dilemma Creek, known for its forested limestone canyon, before meeting the junction of Dilemma Creek with the Fox River.

After the widespread damage caused by Cyclone Ita in 2014, the section of the track between Bullock Creek and Fox River was closed for two years, and this led to complaints. It was eventually re-opened in 2016, after the clearance of around 400 fallen trees.

=== Ballroom Overhang ===
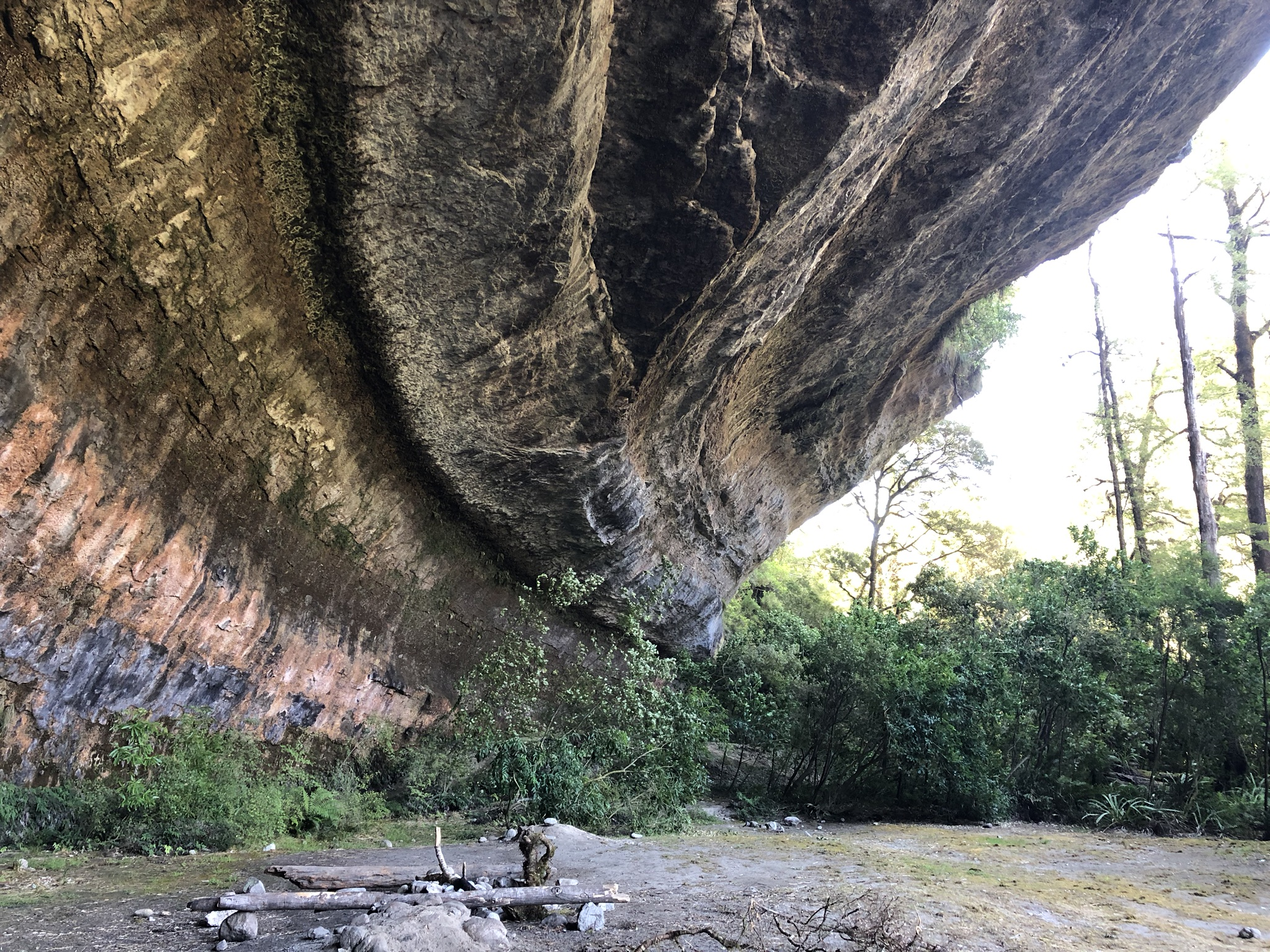
Ballroom overhang – Fox River

The route to the Ballroom Overhang is a short side-trip upstream along the bed of the Fox River, from the confluence with Dilemma Creek. Crossings of the Fox River are required. The Ballroom Overhang is a limestone half-dome shape, formed by erosion at a bend in the river.

=== Dilemma Creek to Fox River mouth ===
There is a formed track downstream from the confluence with Dilemma Creek, on the true left of the Fox River. The track follows the gorge for 2 km, with some climbs around bluffs. There is a river crossing where the route moves to the true right of the Fox River. The route from this point follows the Fox River Caves Track. These caves were closed following the 2016 Kaikōura earthquake because of a large rockfall over the entrance.

There is some river bed travel before a forested track section that leads to the Fox River car park at the northern end of the Inland Pack Track.
