= Pororari River =

River in New Zealand

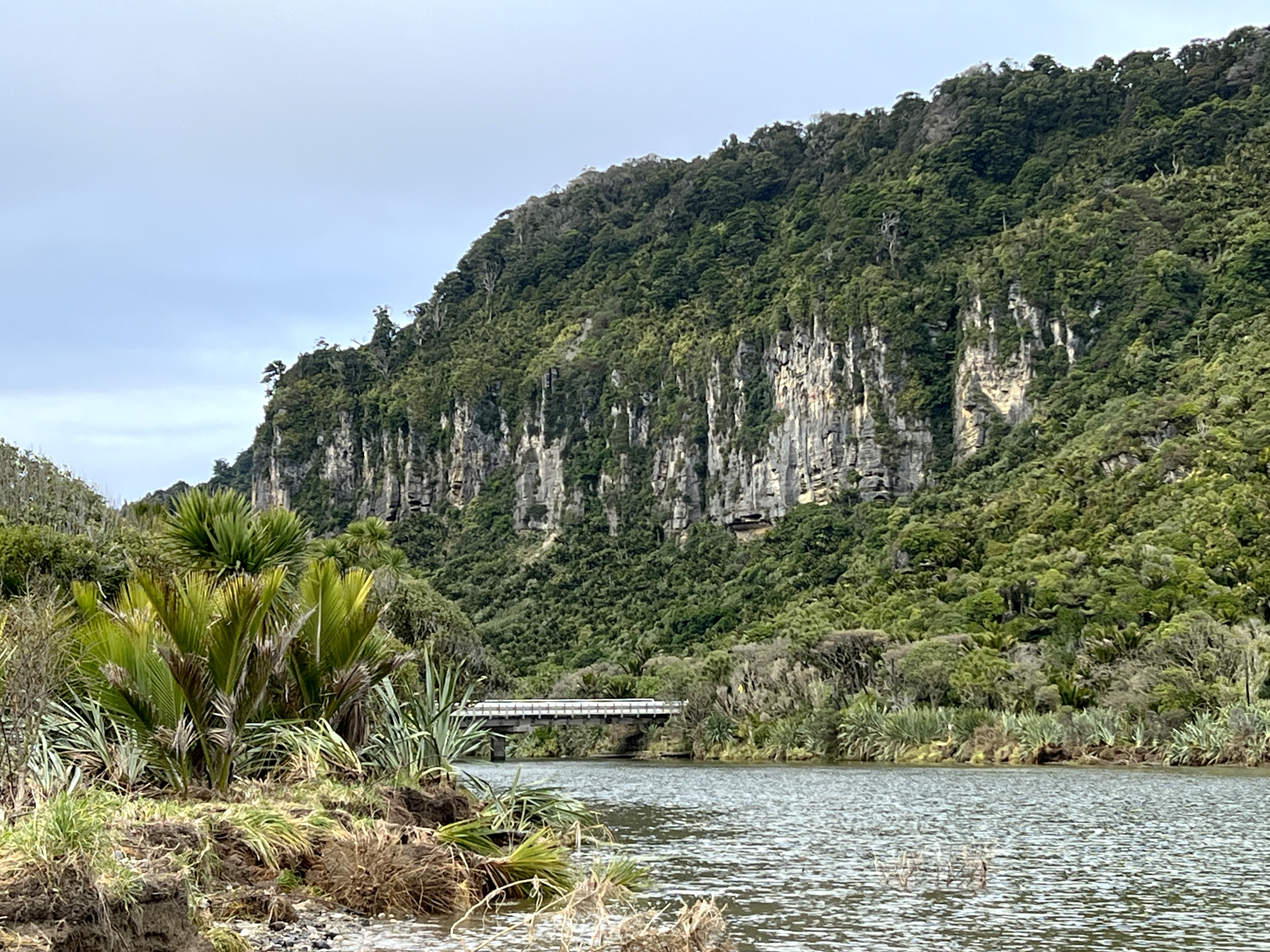
- The Pororari River
- Route of the Pororari River
- Mouth of the Pororari River Pororari River (New Zealand)

Location
- Country: New Zealand
- Region: West Coast
- District: Buller

Physical characteristics
- Source: Paparoa Range
  - coordinates: 42°09′59″S 171°30′01″E
- Mouth: Tasman Sea
  - location: Pororari Lagoon
  - coordinates: 42°06′17″S 171°20′14″E
- Length: 17 kilometres (11 mi)

Basin features
- Progression: Pororari River → Pororari Lagoon → Tasman Sea
- Tributaries
  - left: Tindale Creek, Cave Creek / Kotihotiho
  - right: Watson Creek

The Pororari River, with an older spelling of Porarari, is a river of the West Coast Region of New Zealand's South Island. It flows northwest from its sources in the Paparoa Range, reaching the Tasman Sea at Punakaiki via Pororari Lagoon. Cave Creek / Kotihotiho is a tributary to the river. There are opportunities to tramp along this river, with two different options accommodating multi-hour loop walks. Further upstream, the Pororari River is followed by the new Paparoa Track, which provides an opportunity for multi-day tramping or mountain biking.

== Toponymy ==
When maps were updated for the region, the clerk of Buller County was asked about the correct spelling of the river. His advice was that "Pororari" is the correct spelling, with "Porarari" sometimes having erroneously been used. The Māori language name for the river consists of poro (meaning "broken off") and rari (meaning "uproar"). This is a descriptive term and refers to the upper reaches that are very steep.

== Geography ==
The Pororari River has its source in the Paparoa Range on its western side near Mount Pecksniff, with some tributaries coming from the nearby peak known as White Knight.

The lower part of the Pororari River flows through the Pororari River gorge, a limestone gorge described by the Department of Conservation (DOC) as "spectacular". This part of the river features large rocks and deep pools, with the vegetation transitioning from sub-tropical to temperate.

The one notable tributary is Cave Creek / Kotihotiho, which flows into the Pororari River from its right.

The Pororari River flows into Pororari Lagoon, where it is joined by Bullock Creek before flowing into the Tasman Sea.

== Tracks ==
The Pororari River Track starts at the Paparoa National Park Visitor Centre. Walkers walk along State Highway 6 (SH6) for 1 km (0.62 mi) and then follow the Pororari River on its true-left through the gorge. Just upstream of the gorge, the track ends and meets the Inland Pack Track that also crosses the Pororari River near this junction. The Pororari River Track is often walked as a loop track, with the Inland Pack Track going south, Waikori Road which runs alongside the Punakaiki River and SH6 completing the loop. DOC suggests to allow three hours for the 11 km (6.8 mi) loop.

Another loop track is formed by walking the Pororari River Track and then walking the Inland Pack Track north, and then back towards the coast via Bullock Creek Road which follows Bullock Creek. To complete the loop, walkers follow SH6 for 1 km (0.62 mi) back to the visitor centre. This 15 km (9.3 mi) loop should take five to six hours to walk.

The Pororari River is also followed by the new Paparoa Track, the newest Great Walk. The Paparoa Track was built as a memorial to the 2010 Pike River Mine disaster and can be used by both walkers and mountain bikers. Walkers reach the Pororari River on their third day and descend towards the coast. At the junction with the Inland Pack Track, walkers continue via the Pororari River Track whilst mountain bikers continue towards Waikori Road; biking on the Pororari River Track is not permitted.

Pororari River impressions
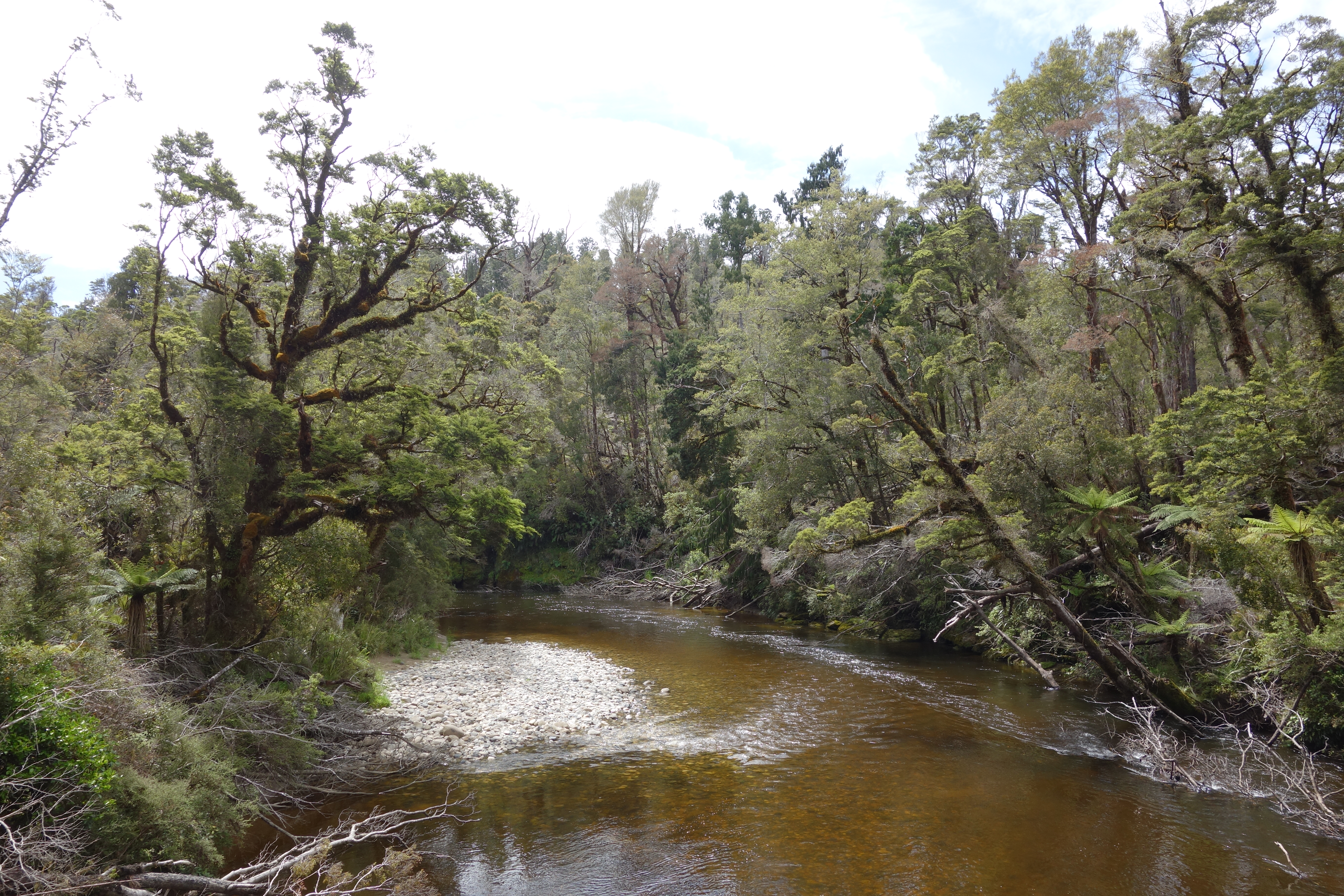
Pororari River upstream of the gorge

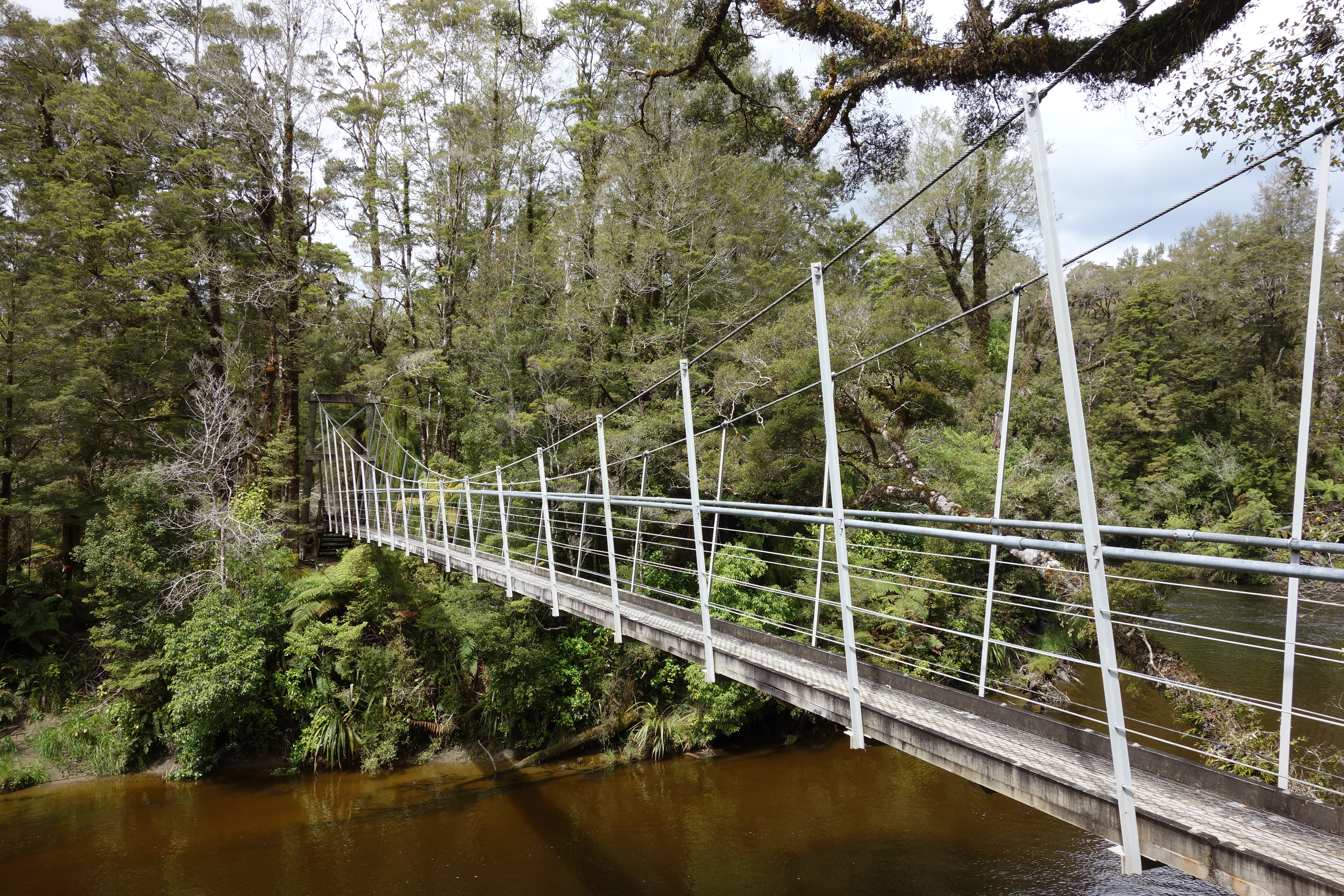
Suspension bridge on the Inland Pack Track

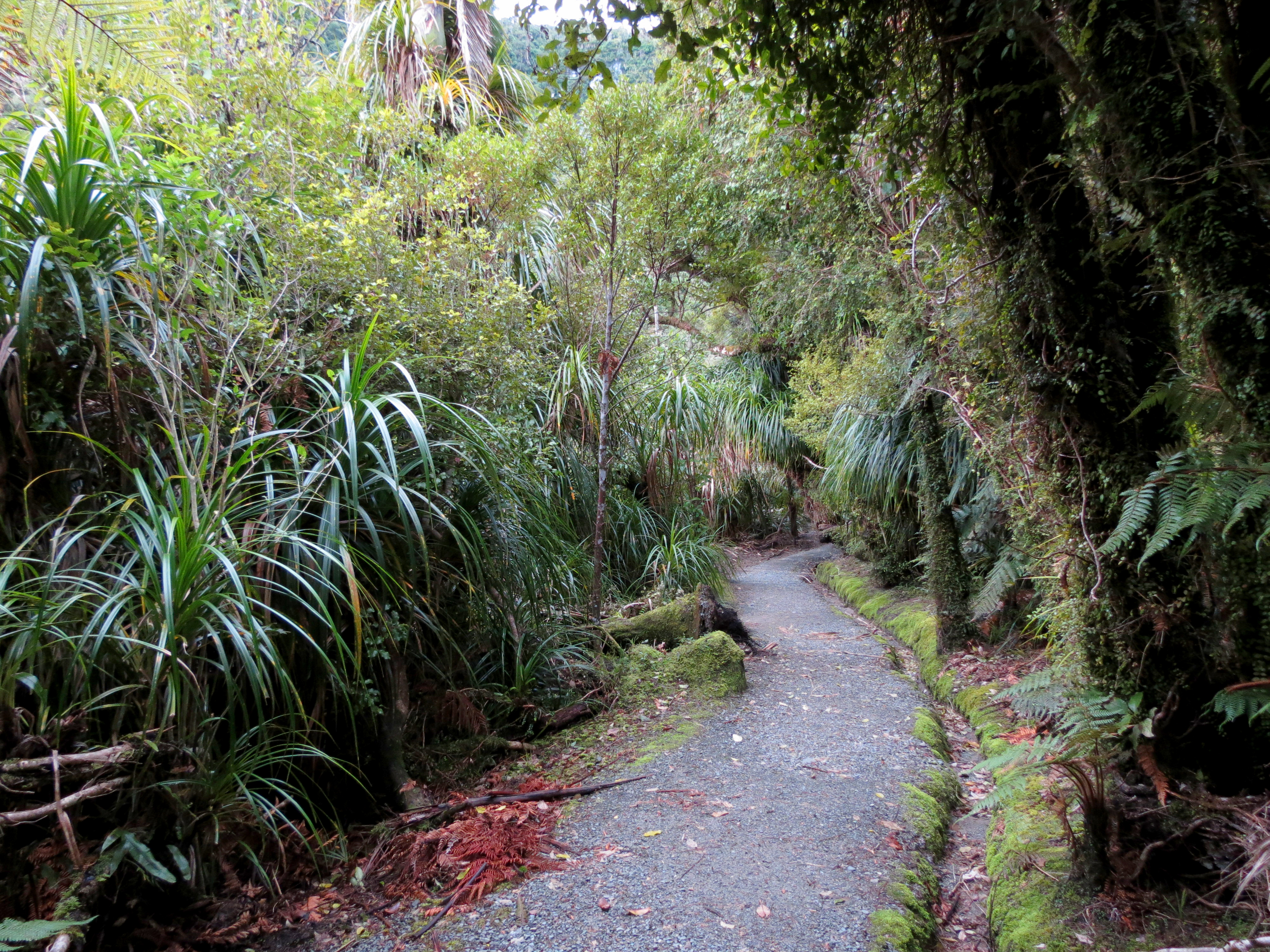
Pororari River Track

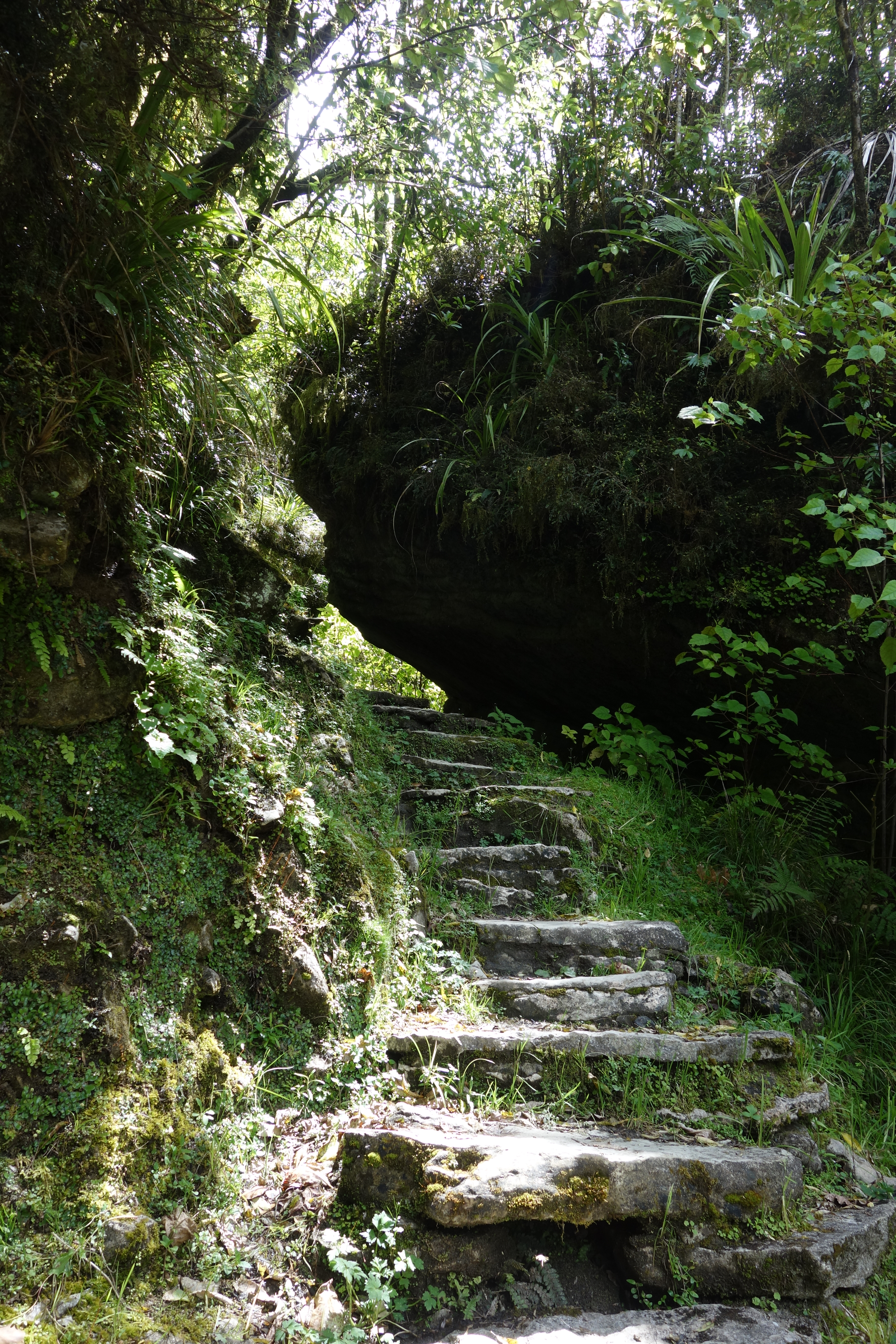
Steps on the Pororari River Track

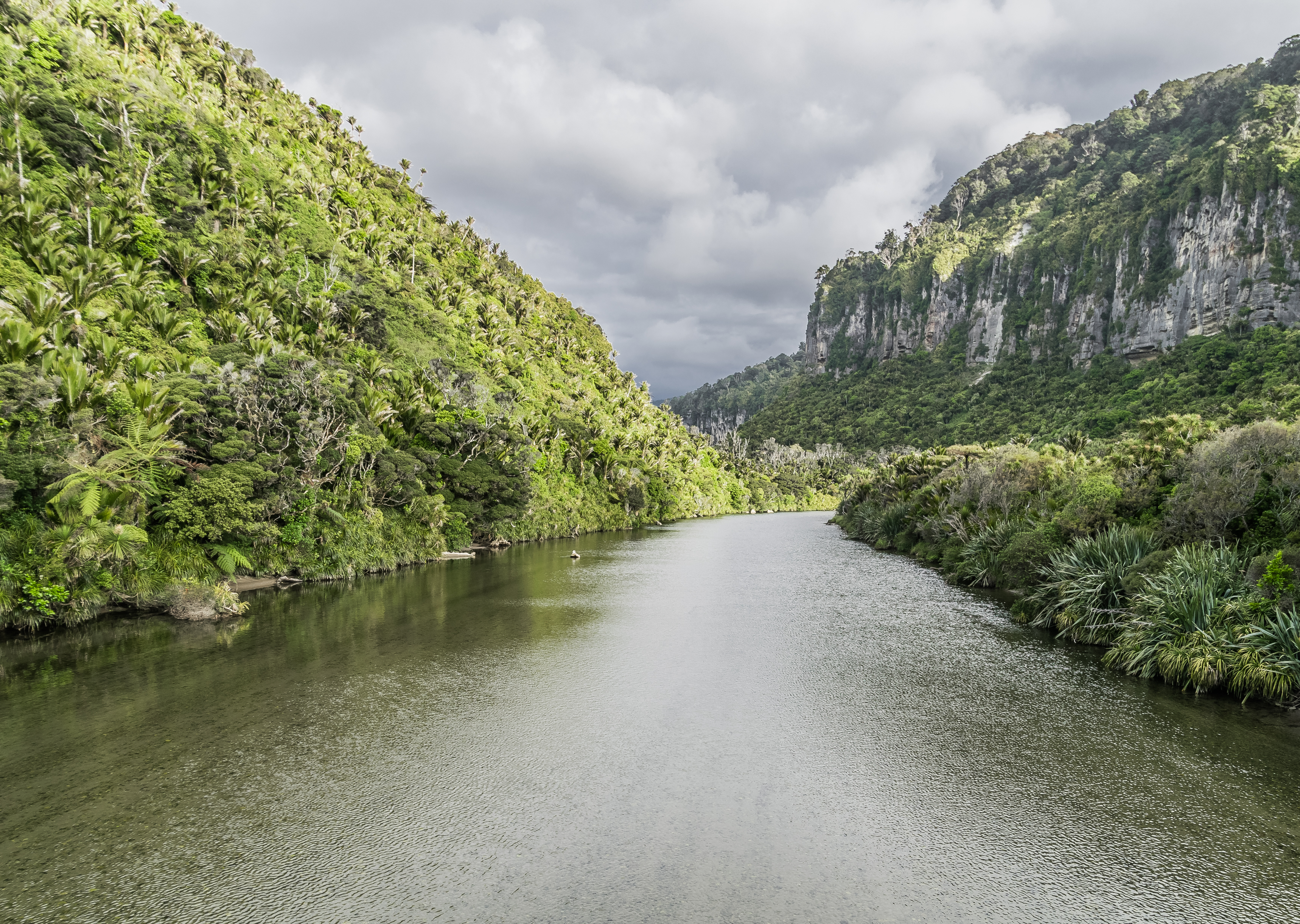
Pororari Gorge

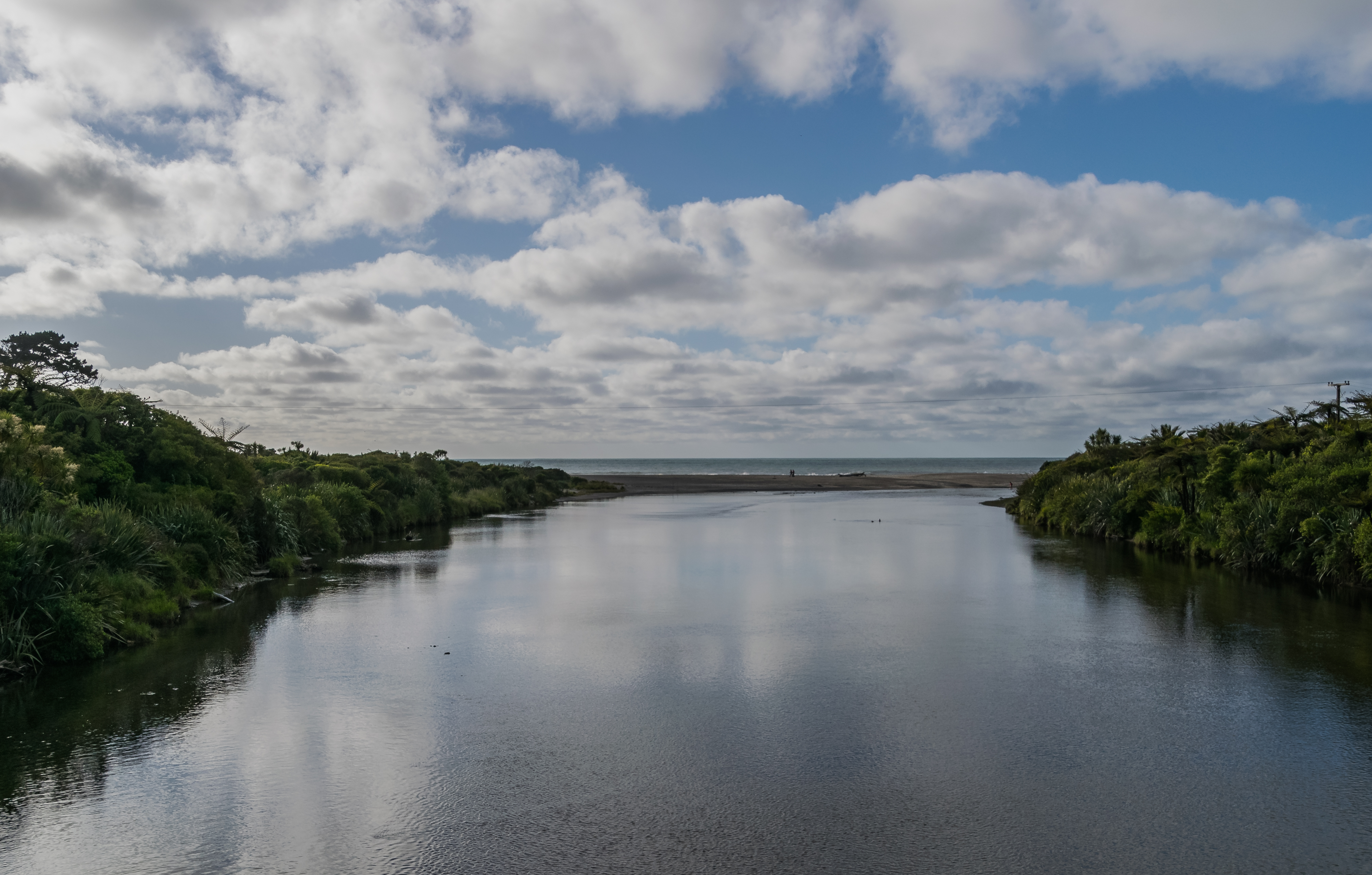
Pororari River from SH6, with Tasman Sea as a backdrop

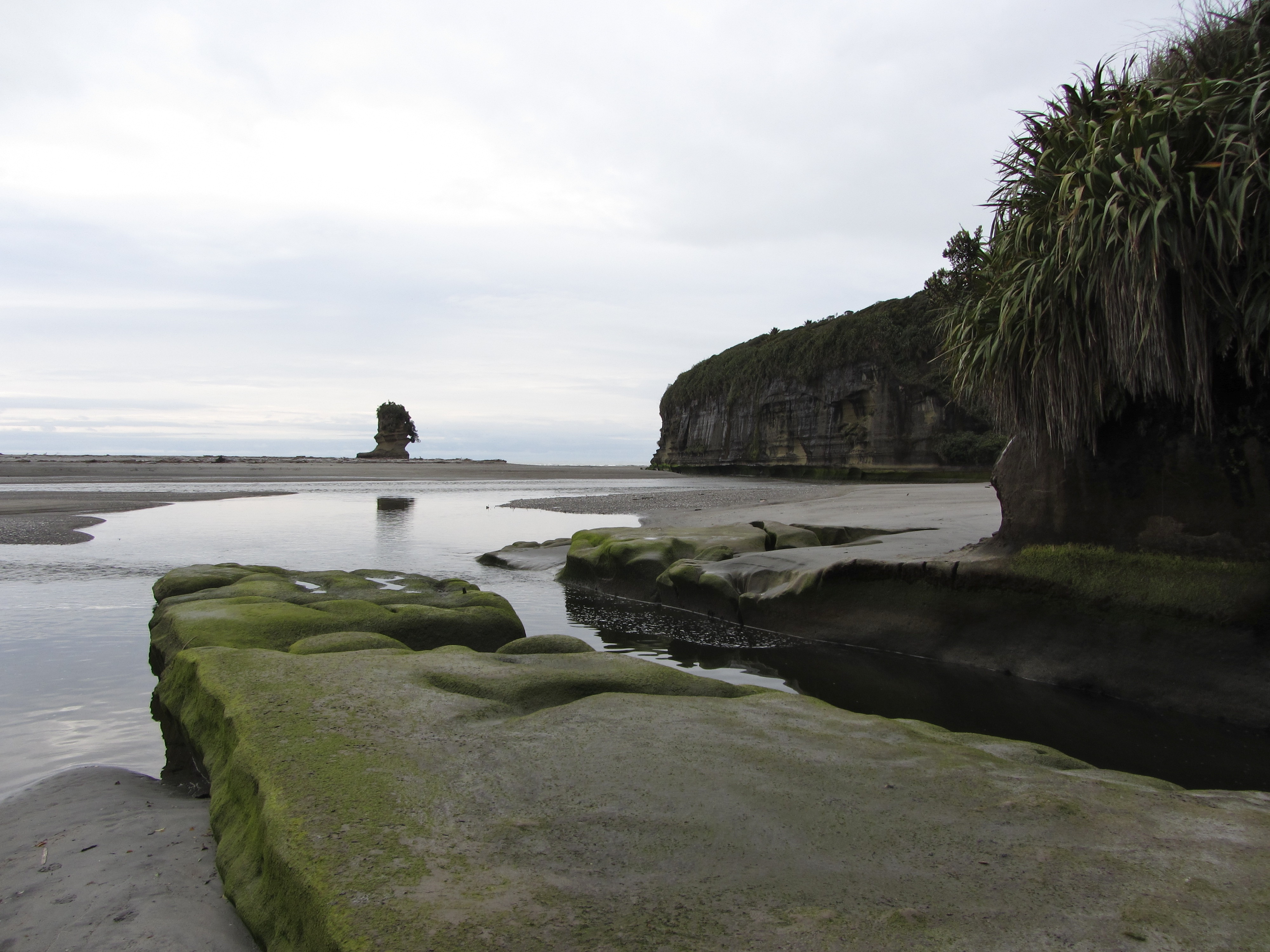
Pororari Lagoon

== See also ==
- List of rivers of New Zealand
