= Mummery (surname) =

Mummery is a surname.

== List of people with the surname ==
- Albert F. Mummery (1855–1895), British mountaineer
- Browning Mummery (1888–1974), Australian operatic tenor
- Browning Mummery (Electronic sound works), stage name of Andrew Lonsdale (born 1961), Australian electronic musician
- Christine L. Mummery (1953), British developmental biologist
- Eddie Mummery, English football player
- John Howard Mummery, a British biologist and source of the eponymous Pink tooth of Mummery
- John Mummery, English appeal court justice
- June Mummery, British businesswoman and politician

== See also ==
- Mummery (disambiguation)
