= Cave Creek disaster =

1995 multi-casualty incident in New Zealand

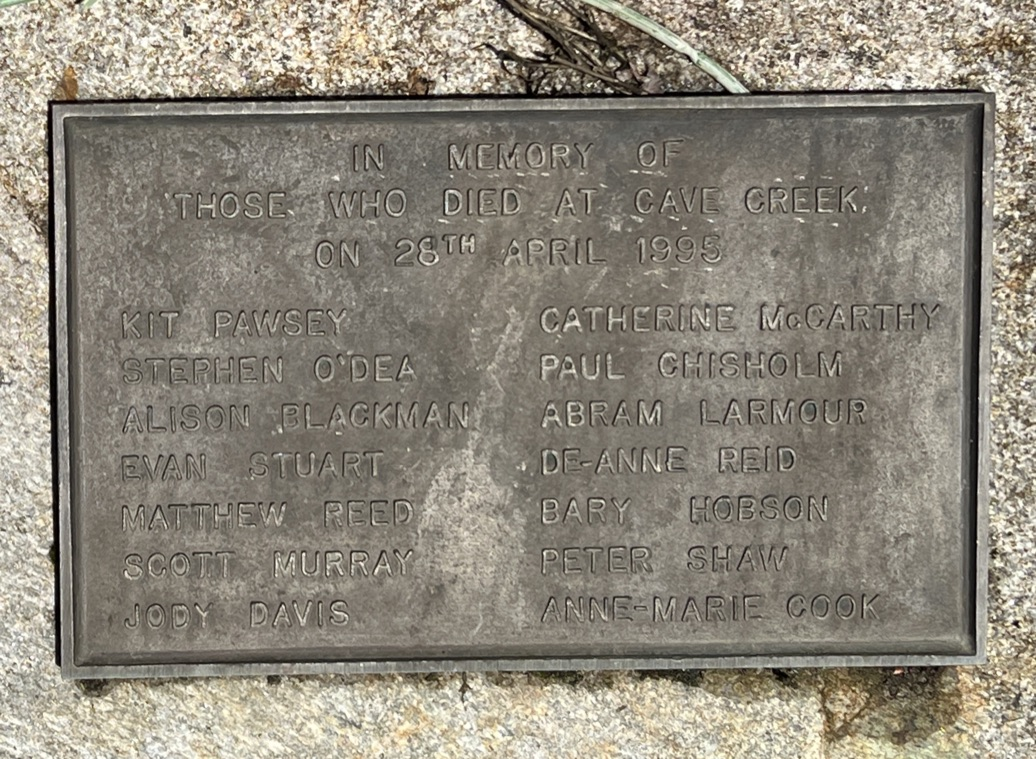
- Memorial at the start of the Cave Creek Kotihotiho Memorial Track, renamed in 2020 on the 25th anniversary of the disaster
- Date: 28 April 1995; 31 years ago
- Time: c. 11:25 (NZST, UTC+12:00)
- Location: Paparoa National Park, New Zealand; 42°06′30″S 171°24′30″E
- Type: Structural failure
- Cause: Overloading and design flaws
- Deaths: 14
- Injuries: 4
- Property damage: Viewing platform collapsed

The Cave Creek disaster occurred on 28 April 1995 when a scenic viewing platform in Paparoa National Park, New Zealand, collapsed, resulting in the deaths of 14 people. The victims, 13 of whom were Tai Poutini Polytechnic students, fell 40 metres (130 ft) onto rocks below. The tragedy resulted in wide criticism of the government and its policies towards funding and management of the conservation estate. Denis Marshall, the Minister of Conservation, eventually resigned, after the Commission of Inquiry's report came out. It also resulted in major changes to procedures used by the New Zealand Department of Conservation, after it was revealed that serious systemic failures had led to the building of the unstable platform. Eventual changes in New Zealand law, following a change of government, allowed for government departments to be held criminally liable for inadequate building practices, in the same way as the non-government organisations.

== Background ==
Cave Creek / Kotihotiho is a small stream in Paparoa National Park. A viewing platform was erected by the Department of Conservation (DOC) in April 1994, looking out over a 40-metre vertical-sided chasm with a view of the resurgence, where the creek emerges from a cave system below.

The builders of the platform did not have appropriate qualifications for the job. Twelve major problems or oversights occurred during the platform's construction (see below), including nails being used to connect the bearers to the piles instead of bolts as no drill was brought to the site. The platform was highly unsafe, especially with large numbers of people on it.

== Platform collapse ==
On the day of the incident, a group of students from Tai Poutini Polytechnic in Greymouth visited the park. En route through the bush, a small group consisting of the polytechnic tutor, a Department of Conservation (DOC) officer, and three students split off, while the larger group of 17 students and a second DOC officer continued towards the platform.

The larger group reached the platform first, and walked to the edge together at about 11:25 a.m. Several students started shaking the platform and it toppled forward into the chasm, killing the DOC officer and 13 of the students. Four students survived the fall with serious injuries.

The second group reached the location shortly after the collapse. Having realised what happened, the remaining DOC officer and one of the students ran back to the start of the track for help, but on arriving they found that the keys were not in the group's vehicles. At this point, the DOC officer returned to the scene of the accident while the student ran along the road with a note containing information about the location of the accident. By 12:15 p.m., he had managed to phone the police at Greymouth.

The remoteness of the site made it difficult for medical services to assist the survivors. The first person to reach the scene was a Greymouth police constable, who arrived on foot two hours after the accident. Ambulances from Greymouth and Westport arrived initially, later followed by RNZAF Bell UH-1H and BK-117 Rescue helicopters from Christchurch.

== Commission of Inquiry ==
A Commission of Inquiry into the accident, headed by District Judge Graeme Noble, highlighted a number of serious concerns with the Department of Conservation's construction of the platform. Specific concerns that were raised included:

- The platform had not been designed or approved by a qualified engineer.
- None of the people involved in building the platform were qualified engineers.
- Nails were used to secure the platform instead of bolts (as intended by the design), because an appropriate drill had not been taken to the building site.
- The steps to the platform, which were supposed to be attached as a counterweight, had not been properly attached.
- A Building Consent had never been obtained for the platform. By the time this was realised, the plans had been lost and replacement (and incorrect) schematics were hastily drawn by an unqualified volunteer exchange student so as to lodge a retrospective application. Further confusion about the Building Act then resulted in the consent never being lodged.
- The platform was not listed in any register that would have resulted in regular inspections.
- A warning sign for the platform, suggesting a maximum limit of five people, had been ordered but was never installed at the site.

Besides the specific flaws in the actual platform and methods of its construction, the Commission said the "root causes" of the collapse were systemic problems in the department as a whole, noting that the department was seriously under-funded and under-resourced. The Commission found that the department had not been given sufficient resources to meet its requirements without "cutting corners", and was frequently forced to accept poor quality standards due to its lack of funding. The report of the Commission concluded that given the department's state, "a tragedy such as Cave Creek was almost bound to happen".

Ten years after the accident, survivor Stacy Mitchell said that he and some other students were shaking the platform hard when it collapsed, which he had not reported at the time through fear of being blamed. Evidence at the inquiry indicated that the platform should have been designed and built to tolerate use that could reasonably be expected.

== Repercussions ==
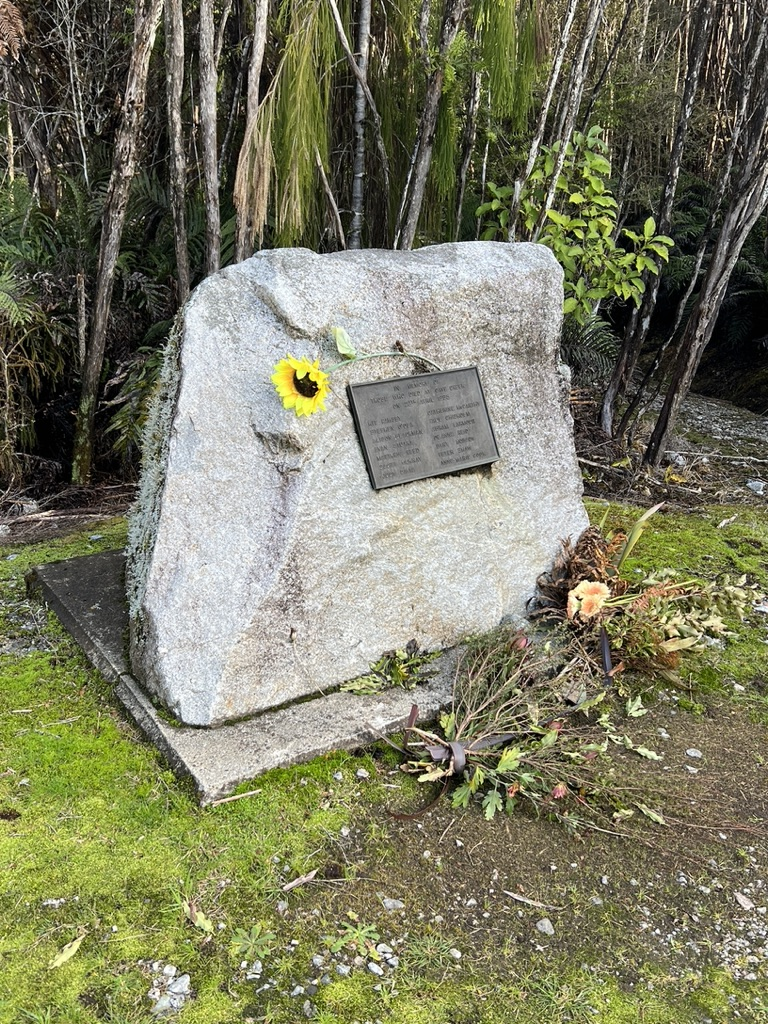
Memorial

Soon after the accident, the Department of Conservation inspected more than 520 structures, and 65 were closed for repairs. The review led to the removal of a large number of structures on public land, and many safety notices appeared on the remainder around New Zealand. Indeed, some felt the response was excessive, for example in cases where bridges and platforms were labelled with signs such as "1 person maximum".

Although DOC took responsibility for the accident, there were no prosecutions as New Zealand law at the time did not permit the Crown to prosecute itself. However, $2.6 million was still paid to the victims' families. Since the accident, New Zealand law has been adjusted to ensure that the Building Act covers government departments, and to allow government departments to be held liable for such negligence in future.

Prime Minister Jim Bolger initially attacked the report produced by the Commission of Inquiry, arguing that the platform failed "essentially because it lacked about $20 worth of bolts to hold it together". The Minister of Conservation, Denis Marshall, was criticised in the media for his management of the department. Many people blamed Marshall, although there was also wide criticism of the whole government's policies on management of the conservation estate. Marshall eventually resigned in May 1996, just over a year after the accident occurred. A new Minister, Nick Smith, was appointed, and a full review of the department was conducted by the State Services Commission.

A memorial plaque was unveiled in April 1996. In 1998 the track re-opened to the public, new stairs replaced the old ones, but the viewing platform was not rebuilt. The platform space has a fence around it and warning signs.

In 1996 New Zealand composer John Dylan wrote an orchestral piece, "Cave Creek 95 - An Elegy" in recognition of the event.

The section of track to Cave Creek from the intersection with the Inland Pack Track was renamed the Cave Creek Memorial Track/Kotihotiho in 2020, as part of the 25 year remembrance of the disaster. There is a memorial on the side of the track to those who died.

The existing walking track (the historic Inland Pack Track) between Bullock Creek and the Paparoa track was partially upgraded as part of the 30th anniversary of the disaster, in 2025.

== See also ==
- Crown Organisations (Criminal Liability) Act 2002
