= Punakaiki River =

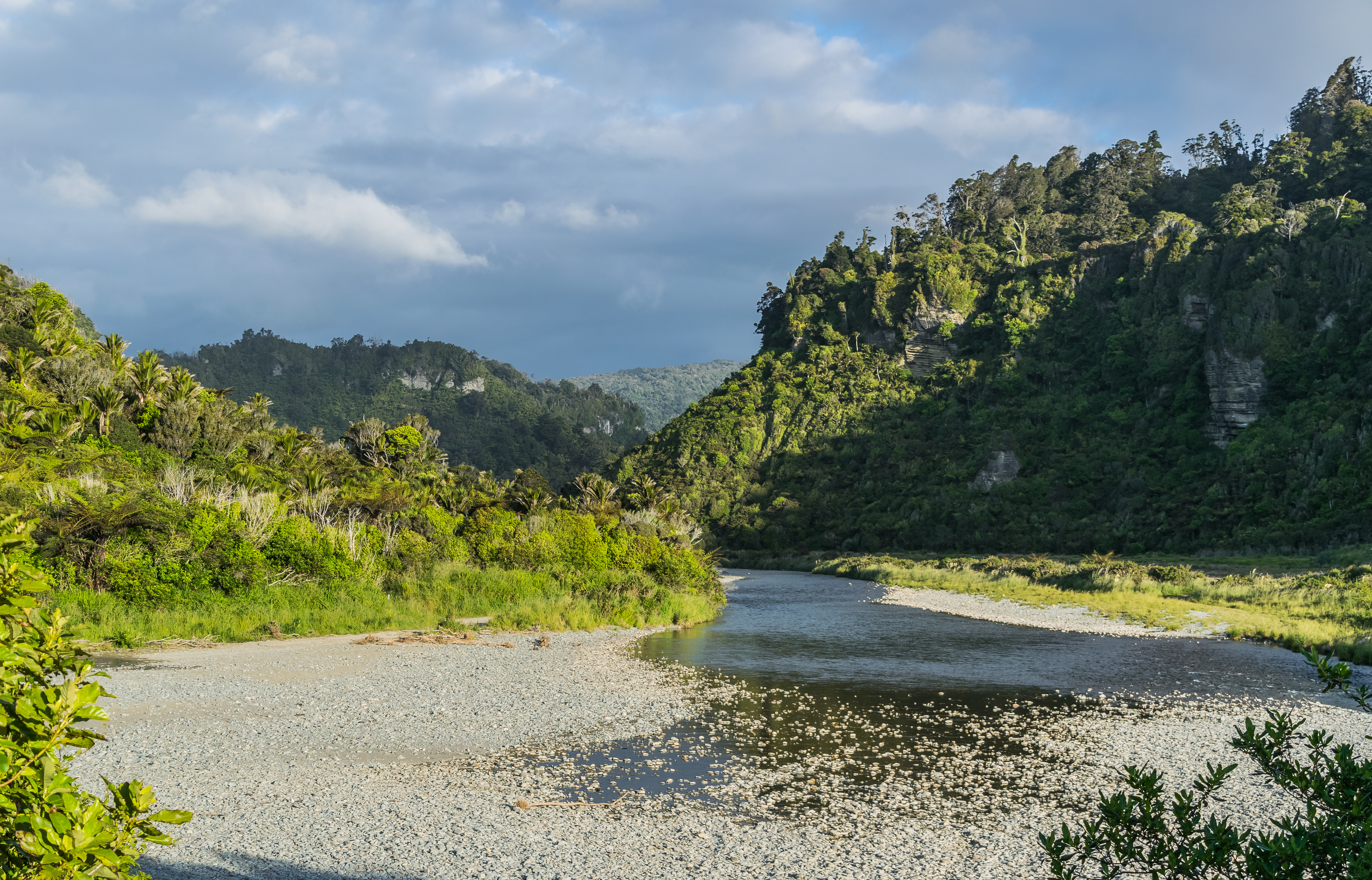
- Punakaiki River near Punakaiki
- Route of the Punakaiki River
- Mouth of the Punakaiki River Punakaiki River (New Zealand)

Location
- Country: New Zealand
- Region: West Coast
- District: Buller

Physical characteristics
- Source: Paparoa Range
  - coordinates: 42°14′29″S 171°25′29″E
- Mouth: Tasman Sea
  - coordinates: 42°07′23″S 171°19′50″E
- Length: 21 kilometres (13 mi)

Basin features
- Progression: Punakaiki River → Tasman Sea
- Tributaries
  - left: Gorge Creek

The Punakaiki River is a river of the West Coast Region of New Zealand's South Island. It flows predominantly northwest from its sources in the Paparoa Range, reaching the Tasman Sea two kilometres south of the town of Punakaiki. Most of the river's length is within Paparoa National Park.

== Recreation ==
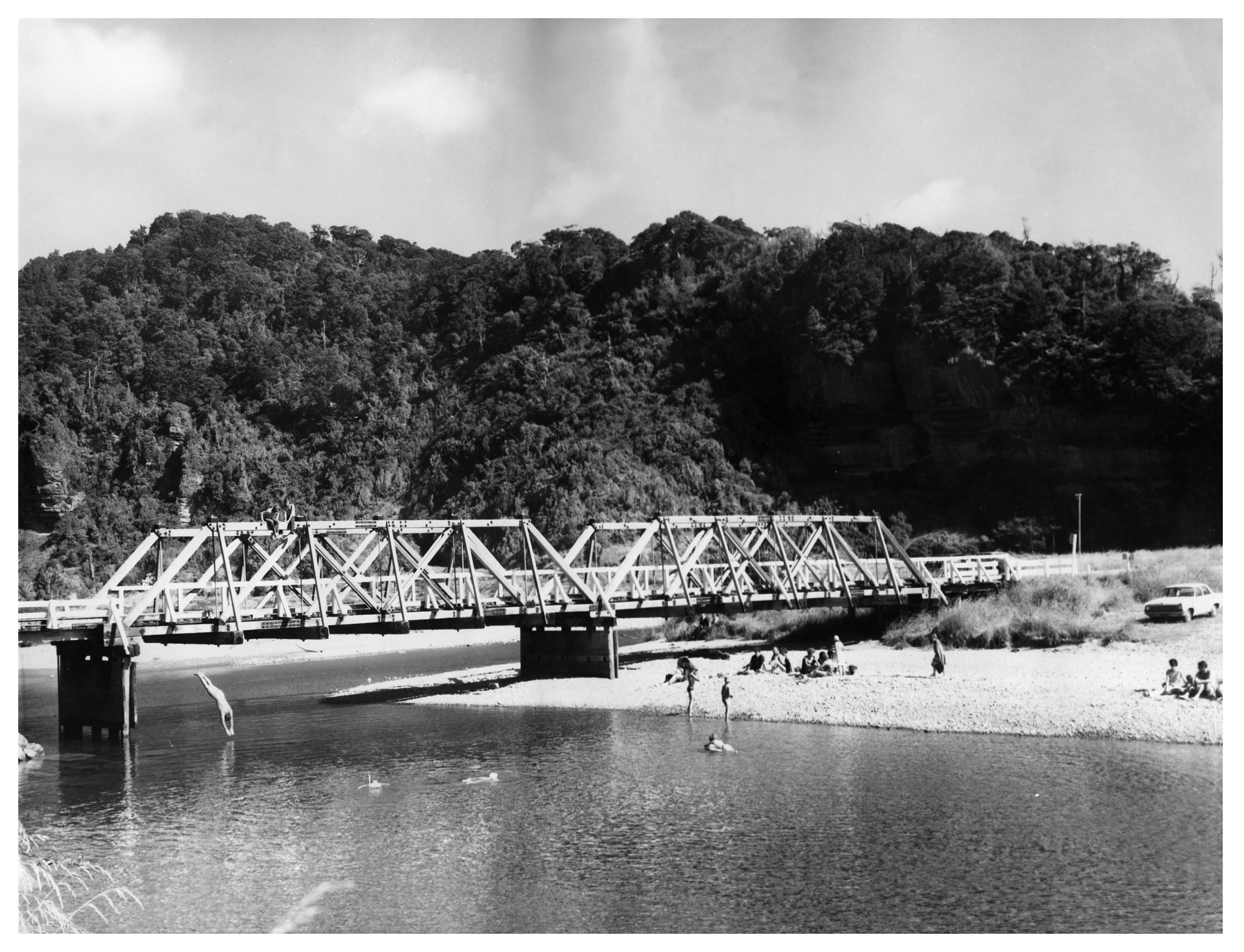
Swimmers diving off the Punakaiki River bridge in 1973

The Inland Pack Track and the Paparoa Track both commence from the south bank of the river at Waipori Road, where there is a suspension bridge across the river. The section of the trail from the Punakaiki River to the Pororari River is dual-use – shared between walkers and mountain bikers, and serves as the northern entry or exit point of the Paparoa Track.

== See also ==
- List of rivers of New Zealand
