= Cave Creek / Kotihotiho =

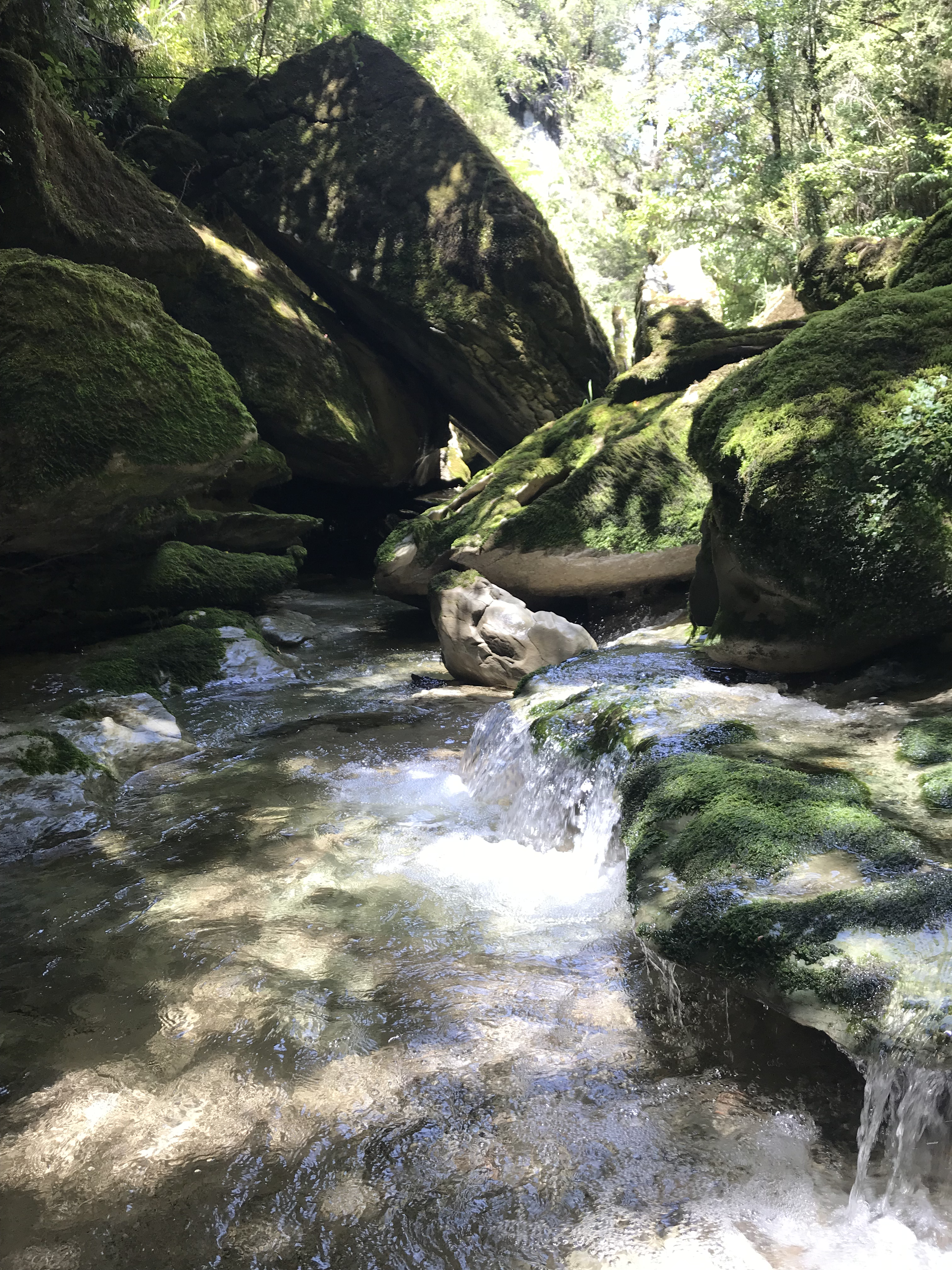
- The Cave Creek resurgence
- Route of Cave Creek / Kotihotiho
- Mouth of Cave Creek / Kotihotiho Cave Creek / Kotihotiho (New Zealand)
- Native name: Kotihotiho (Māori)

Location
- Country: New Zealand
- Region: West Coast
- District: Buller

Physical characteristics
- Source: Cave Creek Resurgence
  - coordinates: 42°06′29″S 171°24′22″E
- Mouth: Pororari River
  - coordinates: 42°07′11″S 171°22′37″E

Basin features
- Progression: Cave Creek / Kotihotiho → Pororari River → Pororari Lagoon → Tasman Sea

Cave Creek / Kotihotiho (Māori: Kotihotiho) is a small river within Paparoa National Park, on the West Coast of New Zealand's South Island.

The creek takes a portion of its name from the limestone cave from which it emerges, flowing through Paparoa National Park's karst landscape for roughly 5 kilometres (3.1 mi) before joining the larger Pororari River. In 1998, the creek was given a dual place name through the Ngāi Tahu Claims Settlement Act 1998, a landmark Treaty of Waitangi settlement with Ngāi Tahu.

The main source of water for the Cave Creek resurgence is a complex series of caves that are largely fed by water from Bullock Creek. There is a hydraulic gradient from Bullock Creek to the Pororari River leading to significant subterranean flows southwards. The entire flow of Bullock Creek can sink underground at the Taurus Major submergence, close to the end of the Bullock Creek road. The water flows 1.5 km underground to a resurgence in the Cave Creek canyon. The underground flows are an example of river capture. The flow of water underground from Bullock Creek to Cave Creek was demonstrated in 1974 with a fluorescein dye test proving the connection.

== Cave Creek disaster ==
Cave Creek / Kotihotiho was the site of the 1995 Cave Creek disaster. On 28 April 1995, 17 Outdoor Recreation students from the Tai Poutini Polytechnic at Greymouth and the Punakaiki Field Centre Manager from the Department of Conservation were on a viewing platform built above a chasm looking down into the Cave Creek resurgence when the platform collapsed. They all fell about 30 metres into the chasm. 14 died and 4 were injured, some seriously. Lack of communications, the remote site, and the rough and difficult landscape hindered rescue efforts. The disaster itself led to a Commission of Inquiry, and then to health and safety reforms in New Zealand and upgrades to Department of Conservation facilities across the country.

The section of track to Cave Creek from the intersection with the Inland Pack Track was renamed the Cave Creek Memorial Track/Kotihotiho in 2020, as part of the 25 year remembrance of the disaster. There is a memorial on the side of the track to those who lost their lives.
