= Chevreul Cliffs =

Cliffs in Shackleton Range, Antarctica

The Chevreul Cliffs (80°32′S 20°36′W) are a set of cliffs rising to about 1,500 metres (5,000 ft) to the east of Mount Dewar in Pioneers Escarpment, Shackleton Range. They were photographed from the air by the U.S. Navy, 1967, and surveyed by the British Antarctic Survey, 1968–1971. In association with the names of pioneers of polar life and travel grouped in this area, They were named by the UK Antarctic Place-Names Committee after Michel Eugene Chevreul, a French chemist whose research on the nature of fats in 1823 led to the invention of stearine candles, used subsequently by polar explorers.
