= Mummer (disambiguation) =

Strictly speaking, a mummer is an actor in a traditional seasonal folk play. The term is also humorously (or derogatorily) applied to any actor.

Mummer may also refer to:

- A mummer, costume-wearing celebrant from medieval to early-modern times
- A participant in the New Year's Day Mummers Parade in Philadelphia, USA, and other similar festivals
- A participant in the Newfoundland and Labrador Christmas time celebration based on the Irish tradition of mummering
- A participant in Mummer's Day, a midwinter celebration in Padstow, Cornwall, UK
- A mime artist, one acting out a story through body motions, without use of speech
- A member of the Summer Mummers theatre group in Midland, Texas, USA
- MUMmer, a bioinformatics software system
- Mummer (album), a 1983 album by the group XTC
- The Mummers, a band based in Brighton, England
