= Fox River (Buller) =

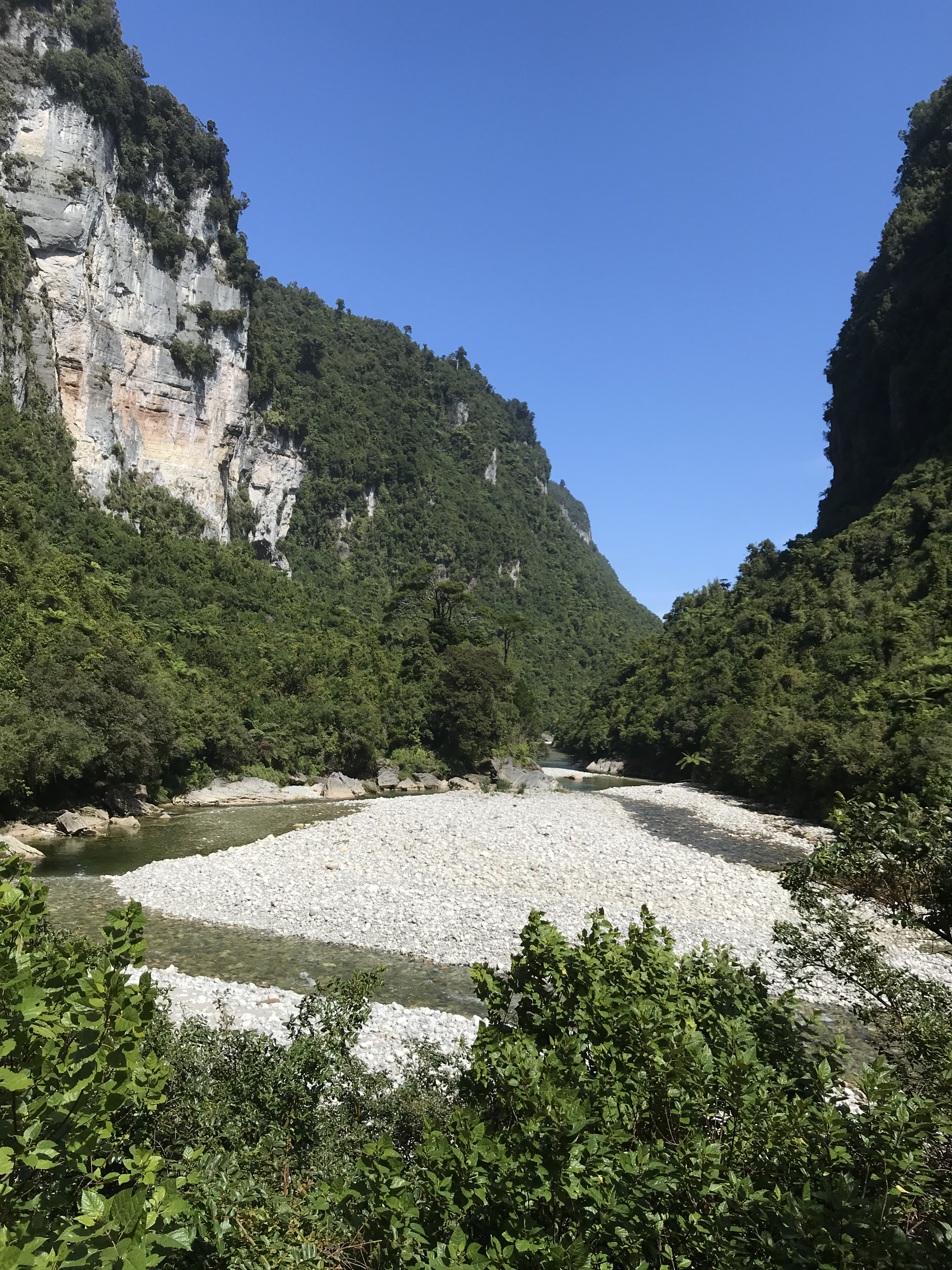
- The Fox River in 2019
- Route of the Fox River
- Native name: Potikōhua (Māori)

Location
- Country: New Zealand
- Region: West Coast
- District: Buller

Physical characteristics
- Source: Paparoa Range
  - coordinates: 42°04′07″S 171°32′53″E
- Mouth: Tasman Sea
  - location: Woodpecker Bay
  - coordinates: 42°01′51″S 171°22′57″E

Basin features
- Progression: Fox River → Woodpecker Bay → Tasman Sea
- Tributaries
  - left: Henniker Creek, Dilemma Creek
  - right: Welsh Creek

The Fox River (originally the Potikohua River) is a river in the Buller District of New Zealand. It arises in the Paparoa Range near Mount Dewar and flows north-west through the Paparoa National Park to the Tasman Sea at Woodpecker Bay. The river passes through a spectacular gorge. The northern branch of the river has limestone caves containing stalactite and stalagmite formations.

== Toponymy ==
The river was named after Bill Fox, a gold prospector. The Māori name Potikohua, comes from poti, a cooking basket, and kohua, steaming oven.

== Description ==
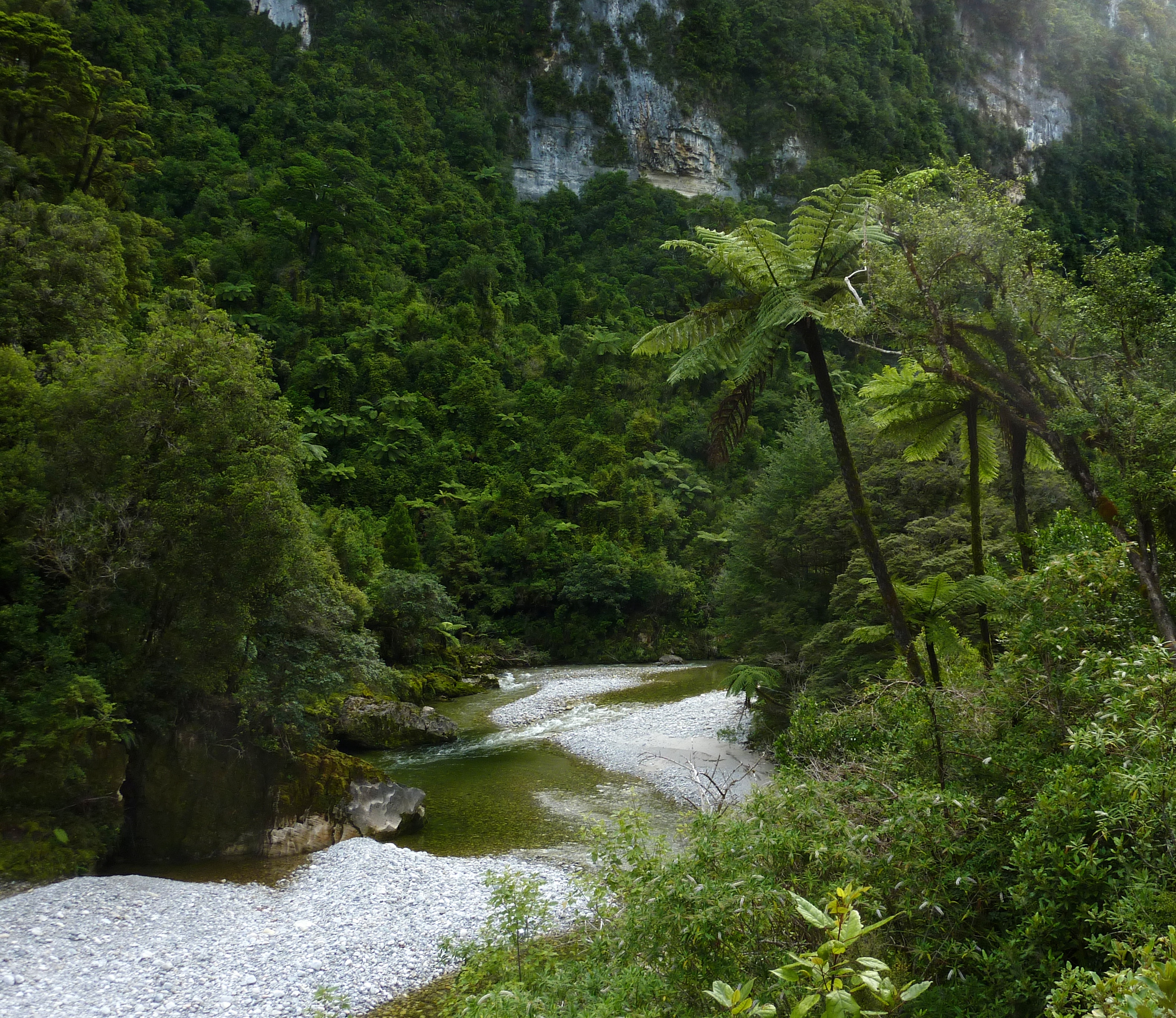
Gorge of the Fox River

The Fox River has its origins high in the Paparoa Range, and flows in a north-west direction through the limestone syncline. The river passes through deep limestone canyons on its way to the coast. One of the main tributaries is Dilemma Creek.

The river valley is characterised by limestone escarpments, with steep sloping faces beneath. The forest type on these slopes is variable in height and composition. Common species include the nīkau palm (Rhopalostylis sapida), and tree ferns (especially mamaku (Sphaeropteris medullaris), pigeonwood (Hedycarya arborea), māhoe (Melicytus ramiflorus), kāmahi (Weinmannia racemosa), and hīnau (Elaeocarpus dentatus), but nīkau and mamaku are often the most common. Above the steep slopes there are some large northern rātā (Metrosideros robusta) and rimu (Dacrydium cupressinum), with occasional miro (Prumnopitys ferruginea). Rimu and miro are mainly present on the more gentle slopes, while northern rātā is the only emergent tree on the steeper slopes below escarpments.

== Tracks ==
=== Inland Pack Track ===
The full 25 km (16 mi) length of the trail goes between the Punakaiki River in the south, and the mouth of the Fox River in the north. It takes two or three days to complete the track.

=== Ballroom Overhang ===
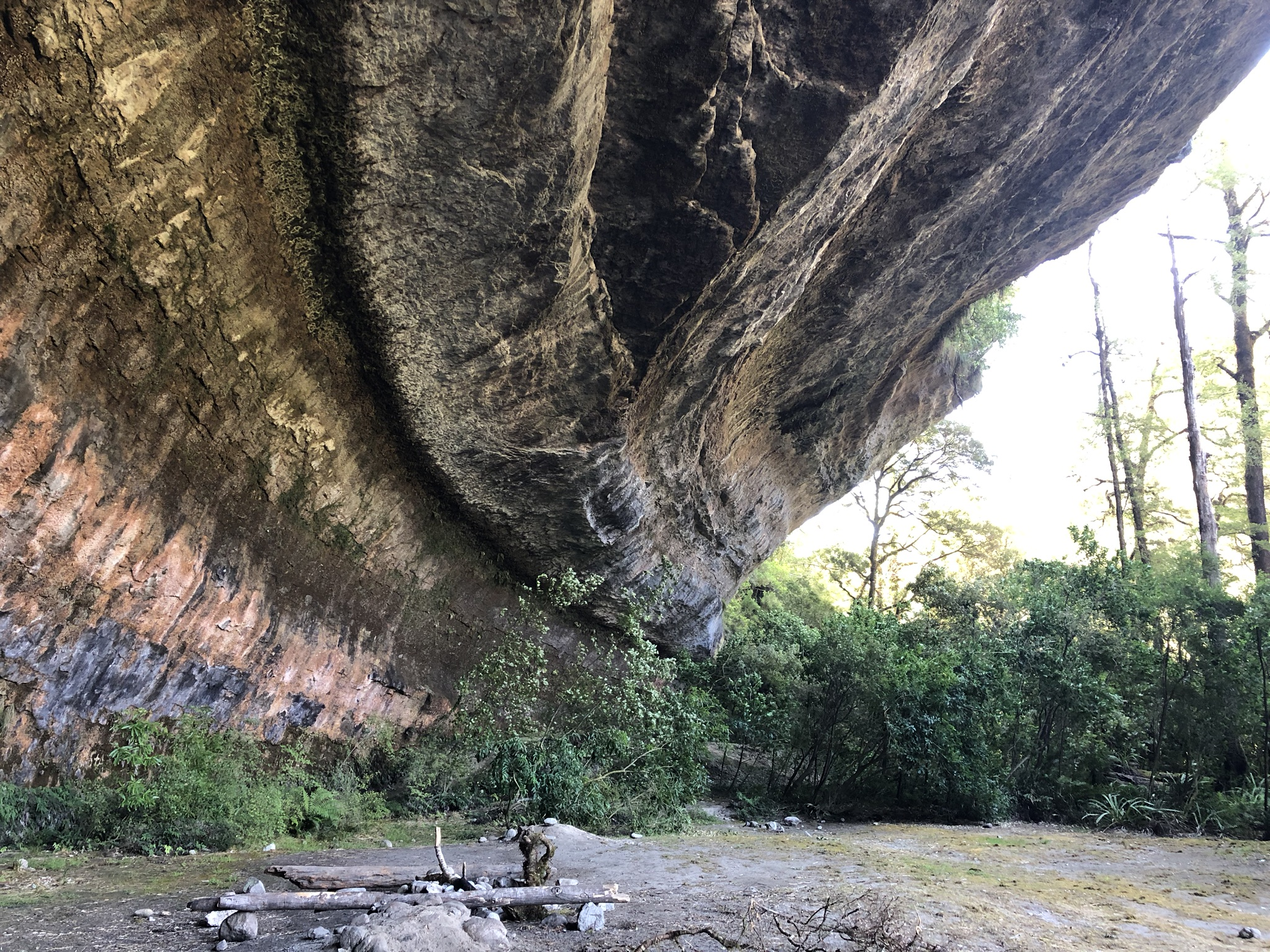
Ballroom overhang - Fox River 2019

The Ballroom Overhang is a large limestone outcrop on the Fox River that provides a sheltered place for resting or overnight camping. The overhang is 10 m (33 ft) at its highest point, 100 m (330 ft) long, and 30 m (98 ft) at its widest point.

In suitable conditions, the 12 km (7.5 mi) hike to the Ballroom Overhang and back can be made as a return day trip from State Highway 6. The Ballroom Overhang can be reached from the Inland Pack Track, and is approximately 500 metres (1,600 ft) upstream from the junction of Fox River and Dilemma Creek. This part of the route requires several river crossings and has been classified by the Department of Conservation as an advanced tramping track.

=== Fox River caves ===
The Fox River caves, situated 3.7 km (2.3 mi) up from the Fox River carpark, were an early tourist attraction in the area. The caves were receiving visitors in guided tours from around 1900. The caves have been well known for their stalactite formations.

Following the 2016 Kaikōura earthquake, the Department of Conservation closed the Fox River caves because of the discovery of a large rockfall over the cave entrance.
