= Mount Dewar =

Mountain in Coats Land, Antarctica

Mount Dewar (80°32′S 21°11′W) is a mountain rising to about 1,600 metres (5,200 ft) to the southwest of Aronson Corner in the Pioneers Escarpment, Shackleton Range. It was photographed from the air by the U.S. Navy in 1967 and surveyed by the British Antarctic Survey from 1968 to 1971. In association with the names of pioneers of polar life and travel grouped in this area, it was named in 1971 by the UK Antarctic Place-Names Committee after Sir James Dewar, a Scottish chemist and physicist who invented the thermos flask about 1892.
