= Tai Poutini Polytechnic =

New Zealand polytechnic

Coordinates: 42°27′5.3″S 171°12′38.31″E

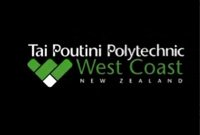
- Established: 1989
- Academic staff: 168 FTE Staff 2017
- Students: 1,840 EFTS 2017
- Location: Greymouth, New Zealand
- Affiliations: Public NZ TEI
- Website: www.tpp.ac.nz

Tai Poutini Polytechnic (TPP) is a New Zealand company that aims to provide tertiary education meeting the needs of West Coast students and businesses. TPP's West Coast programmes include tourism and hospitality training across the retail and service sector, outdoor education training, agriculture, extractive/mining, and specialist jade and hard stone carving programmes.

== History ==
In 2017, TPP received a rating of 4 from the New Zealand Qualifications Authority, the worst rating received for a polytechnic institute. In 2018, the New Zealand–based media company Stuff released an article about TPP criticizing Tai Poutini Polytechnic.

On 1 April 2020, Tai Poutini Polytechnic was subsumed into Te Pūkenga (the New Zealand Institute of Skills and Technology) alongside the 15 other Institutes of Technology and Polytechnics (ITPs).

In mid-July 2025, the Vocational Education Minister Penny Simmonds announced that Tai Poutini Polytechnic along with NorthTec, Western Institute of Technology at Taranaki (WITT), Whitireia New Zealand and the Wellington Institute of Technology (WelTEC) would temporarily remain with Te Pūkenga until final decisions were made in early 2026.

On 1 January 2026, it was confirmed that Tai Poutini Polytechnic would remain part of Te Pukenga until 1 January 2027. In late March 2026, Simmonds confirmed that Tai Poutini would be merged with the Open Polytechnic of New Zealand from 1 January 2027.

== Programmes ==
Tai Poutini offers a range of mainstream and specialist programmes. Specialist outdoor education programmes, including ski patrol, are located in the South Island. The polytechnic's one and two year jade carving programmes are unique to New Zealand, and are situated near the source of West Coast jade.

Study options:

- Agriculture
- Arts and carving
- Automotive and engineering
- Business and IT
- Chef and hospitality
- Civil and mining
- Community Education
- Emergency management and search and rescue
- Health and beauty
- Industry training
- Outdoor education and ski patrol
- Tourism
- Trades

TPP provides educational opportunities for approximately 6,000 students annually through full or part-time study options. Its objective is to facilitate employment opportunities within the local community. To achieve this, TPP collaborates with industry partners and local employers to tailor training programs to the specific needs of the West Coast region. Training is conducted at local campuses situated in Greymouth and Westport, supplemented by on-site training at diverse locations throughout the region. This approach enables students to encounter real-world work requirements during their education.

In addition to their West Coast–based programmes, TPP also offers a variety of national niche programmes at sites from Wānaka to Auckland, encompassing:

- emergency management and search and rescue training through our Emergency Management Department;
- industry training including scaffolding, industrial ropes, rigging, and cranes;
- civil construction industry training;
- ski patrol training based in Wānaka.
