= Mummery Cliff =

Cliff

Mummery Cliff (80°27′S 21°23′W) is a cliff situated in Antarctica rising to about 1,250 m to the southeast of Whymper Spur in the Pioneers Escarpment, Shackleton Range. In association with the names of pioneers of polar life and travel grouped in this area, named by the United Kingdom Antarctic Place-Names Committee (UK-APC) in 1971 after Albert F. Mummery (1855–95), English mountaineer and designer of the Mummery tent.
