= Truman Track =

Walking trail in New Zealand

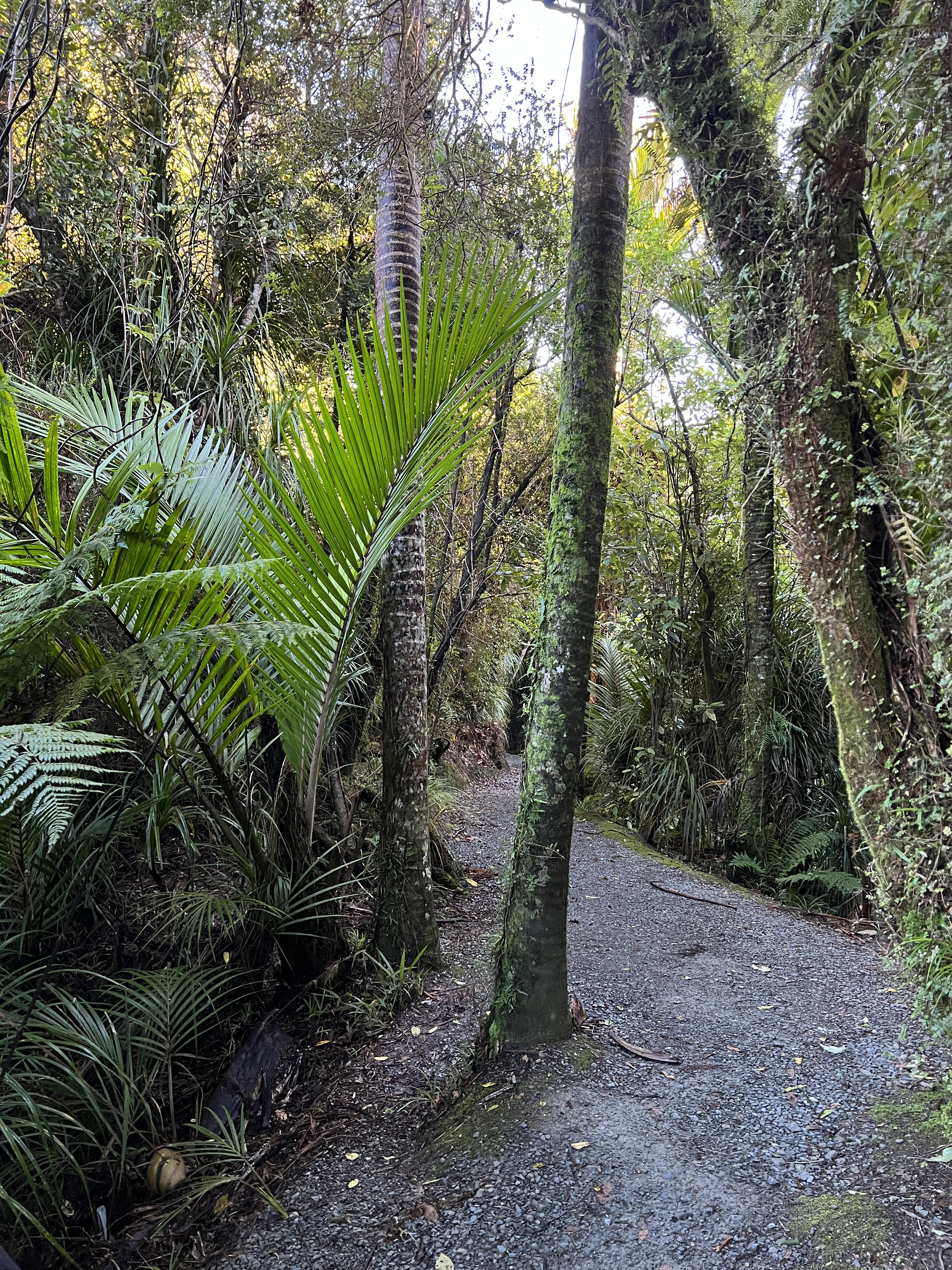
- Length: 600 m (2,000 ft)
- Location: Te Miko, Punakaiki, New Zealand
- Trailheads: State Highway 6, Punakaiki
- Use: Tramping
- Difficulty: easy
- Sights: lowland forest, Tasman Sea
- Surface: gravel path
- Website: Department of Conservation

The Truman Track is a short, easy walking track located north of Punakaiki, in the coastal Paparoa National Park in the South Island of New Zealand. Although only 600 m (2,000 ft) long, it has been described as "one of the most delightful and interesting short walks on the West Coast". The track passes through lowland coastal forest of podocarps, rātā trees and nīkau palms, with dense understorey vegetation. It finishes at the coastline, where there is a viewing platform providing views along the coast, with surrounding cliffs, rock overhangs, and a waterfall that cascades directly onto the beach.

== Toponymy ==
The track is named after Jim Truman, of Truman's Department Store in Greymouth. He had a holiday cottage adjacent to the track.

== Geography ==
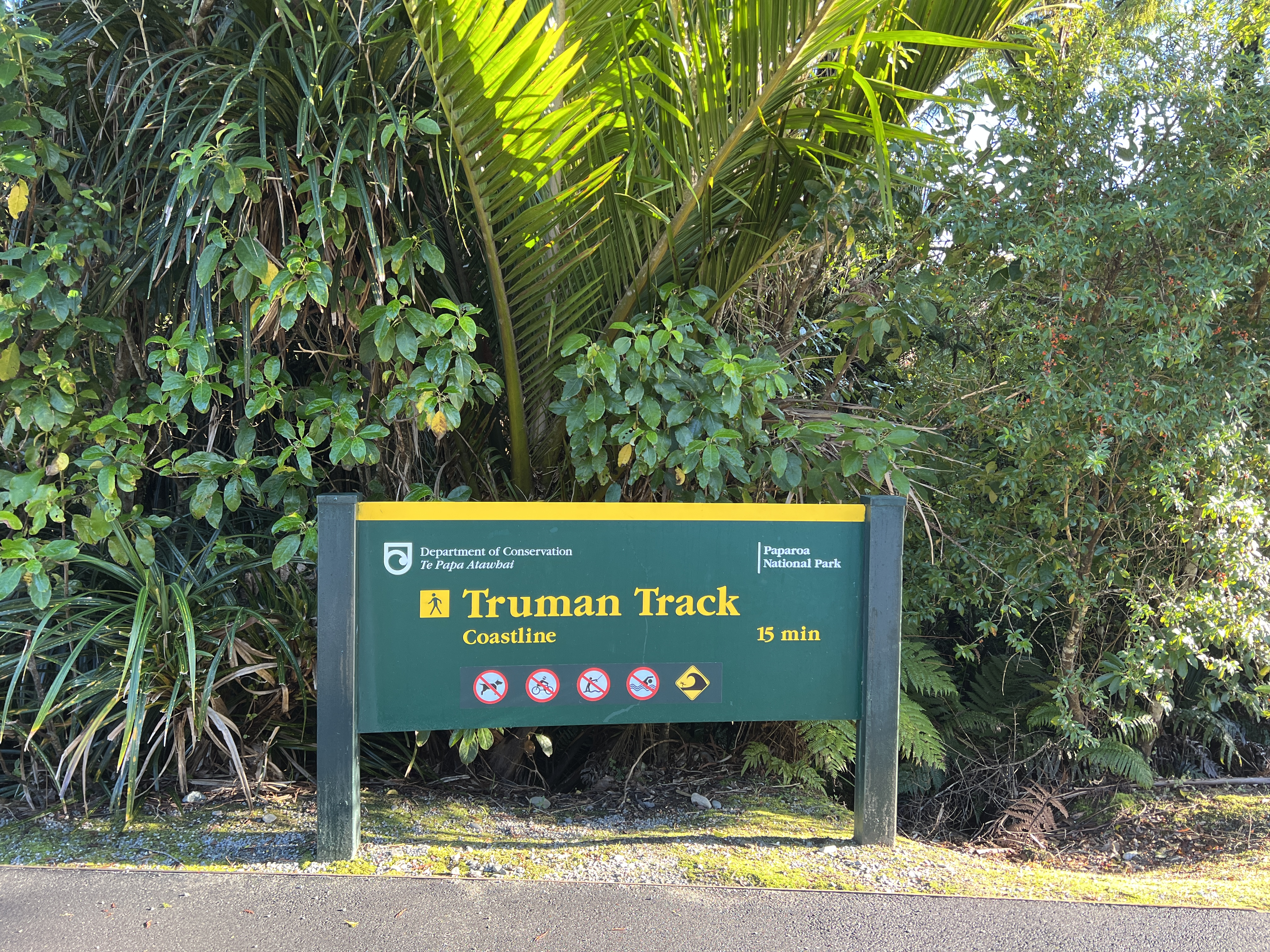
Track entrance

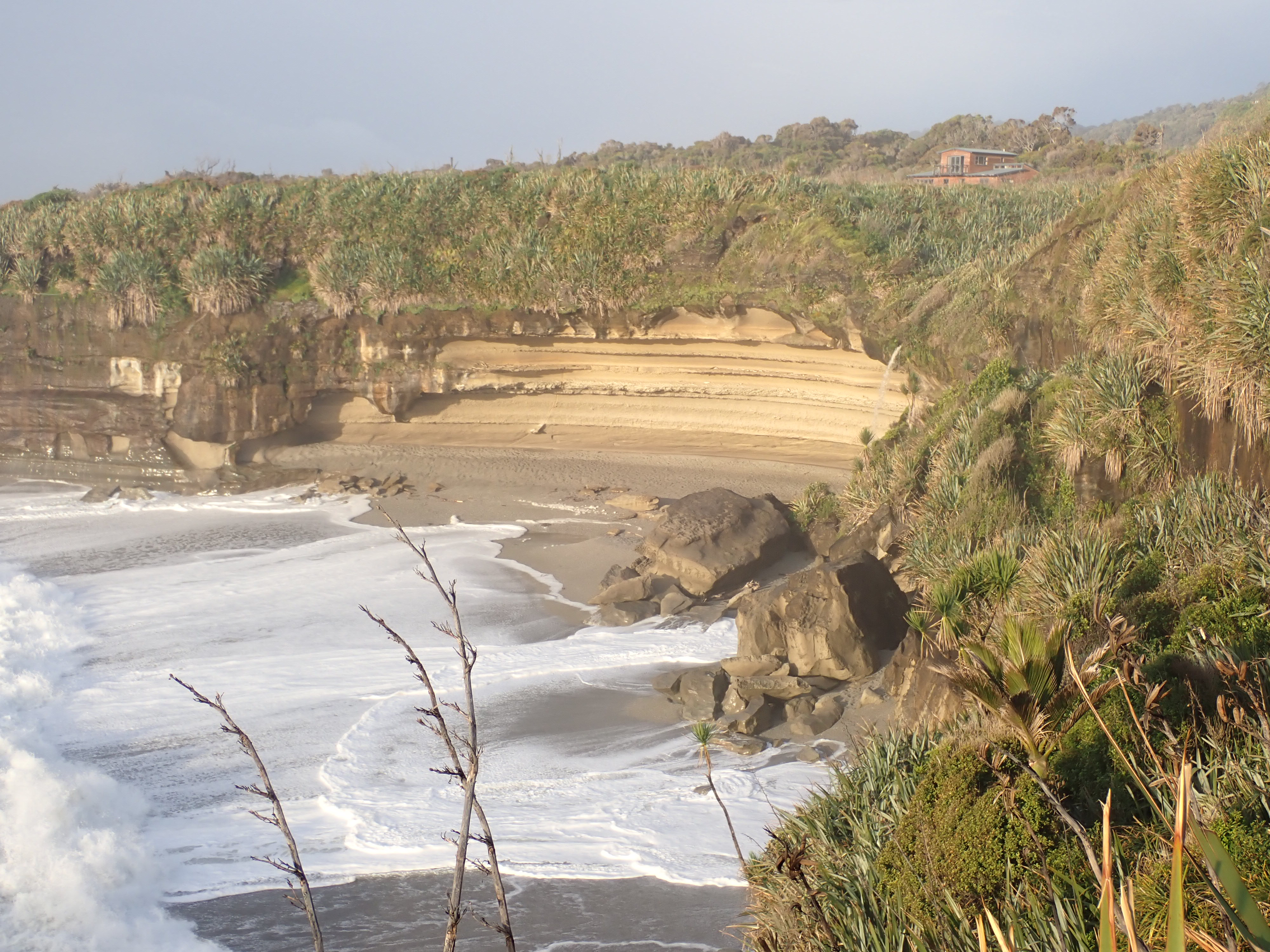
Beach from viewing platform

The Truman Track begins at Te Miko, 3 km (1.9 mi) north of the Department of Conservation visitor centre in Punakaiki and 45 km north of Greymouth. The track entrance is on State Highway 6, with a small car park on the other side of the highway. The easy, level pathway passes through lush temperate rain forest typical of the West Coast and emerges in coastal flax vegetation, finishing at a clifftop viewing platform with views of Dolomite Point to the south and Perpendicular Point to the north. The track is only 600 m (2,000 ft) long and takes just 15 minutes to complete. A stairway leads from the platform to the beach, which has scenic mudstone overhangs and a rocky platform at low tide, but is not safe for swimming; rogue waves have swept away at least two tourists.

== Natural history ==
The Truman track begins in West Coast coastal rainforest, and ends in salt meadows. The forest at its beginning is dominated by rātā (Metrosideros) and rimu (Dacrydium cupressinum), with an understory of kāmahi (Weinmannia racemosa), toro (Myrsine salicina), miro (Prumnopitys ferruginea), mahoe (Melicytus ramiflorus), and pigeonwood (Hedycarya arborea). The tree ferns wheki (Dicksonia squarrosa) and mamaku (Sphaeropteris medullaris) are also present. A short way along the track an information board highlights a mature mataī (Prumnopitys taxifolia) tree, the host of a northern rātā (Metrosideros robusta), which has grown in the crown and sent down roots to surround and strangle the mataī trunk.

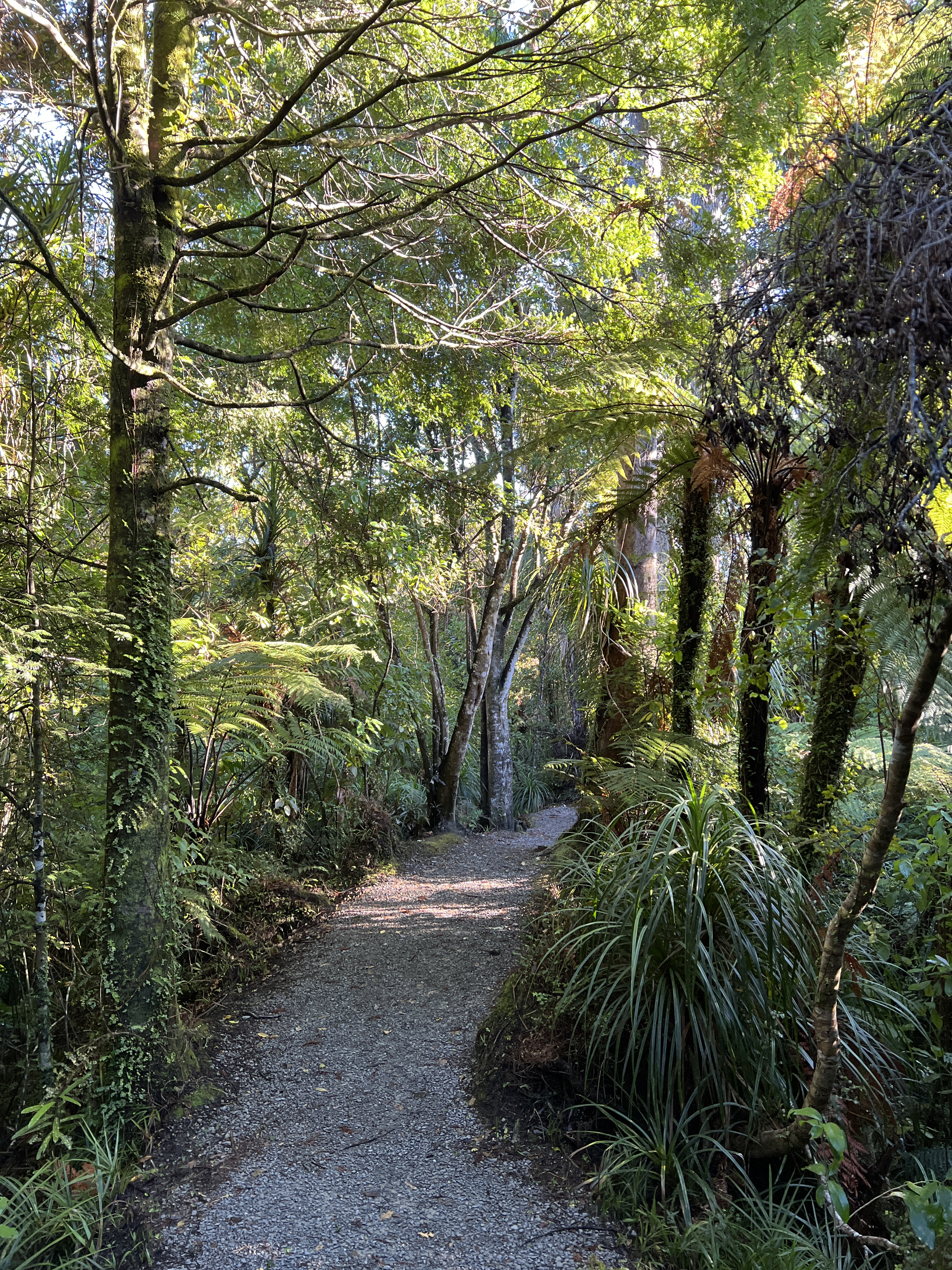
Forest

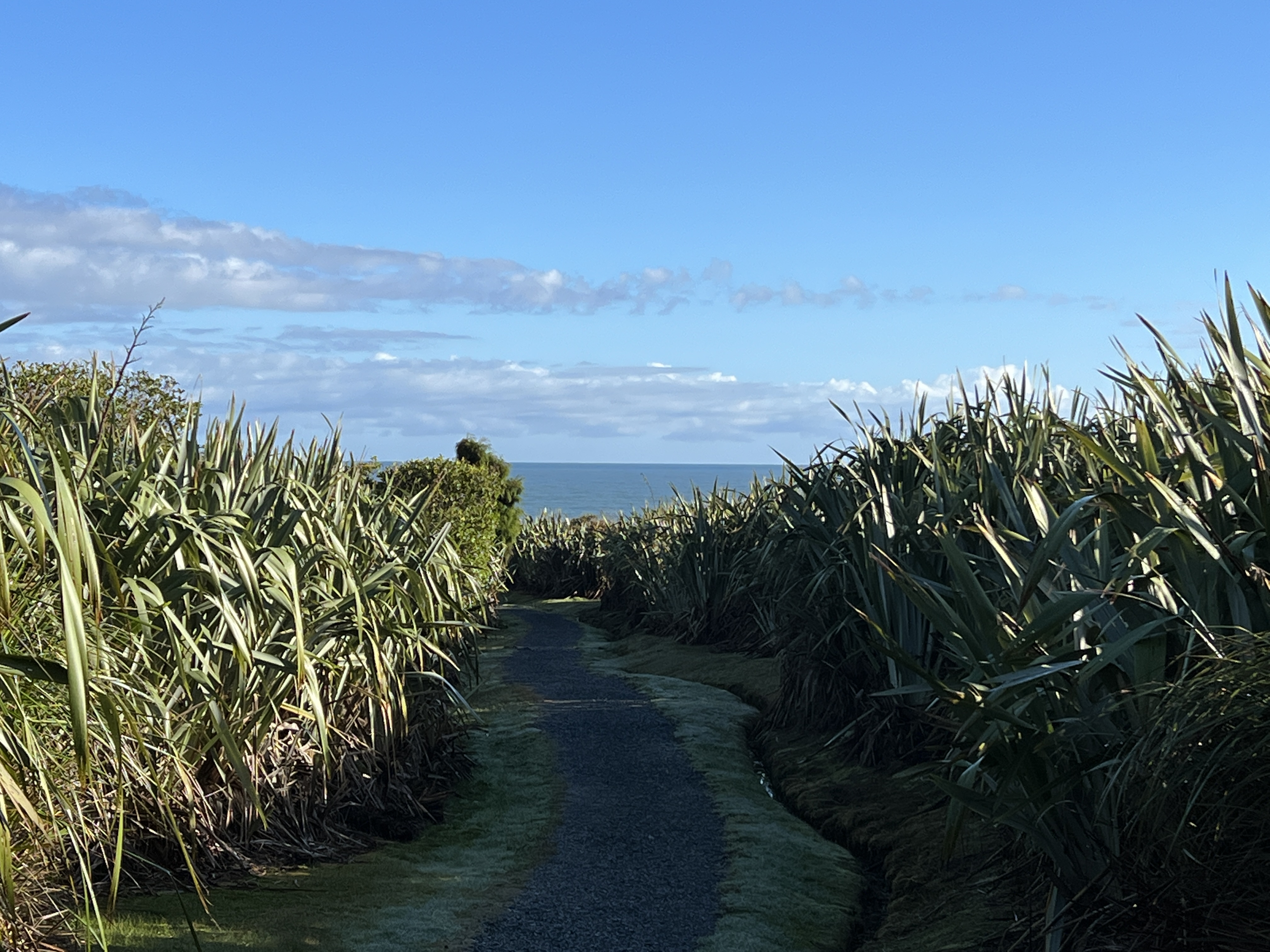
Harakeke

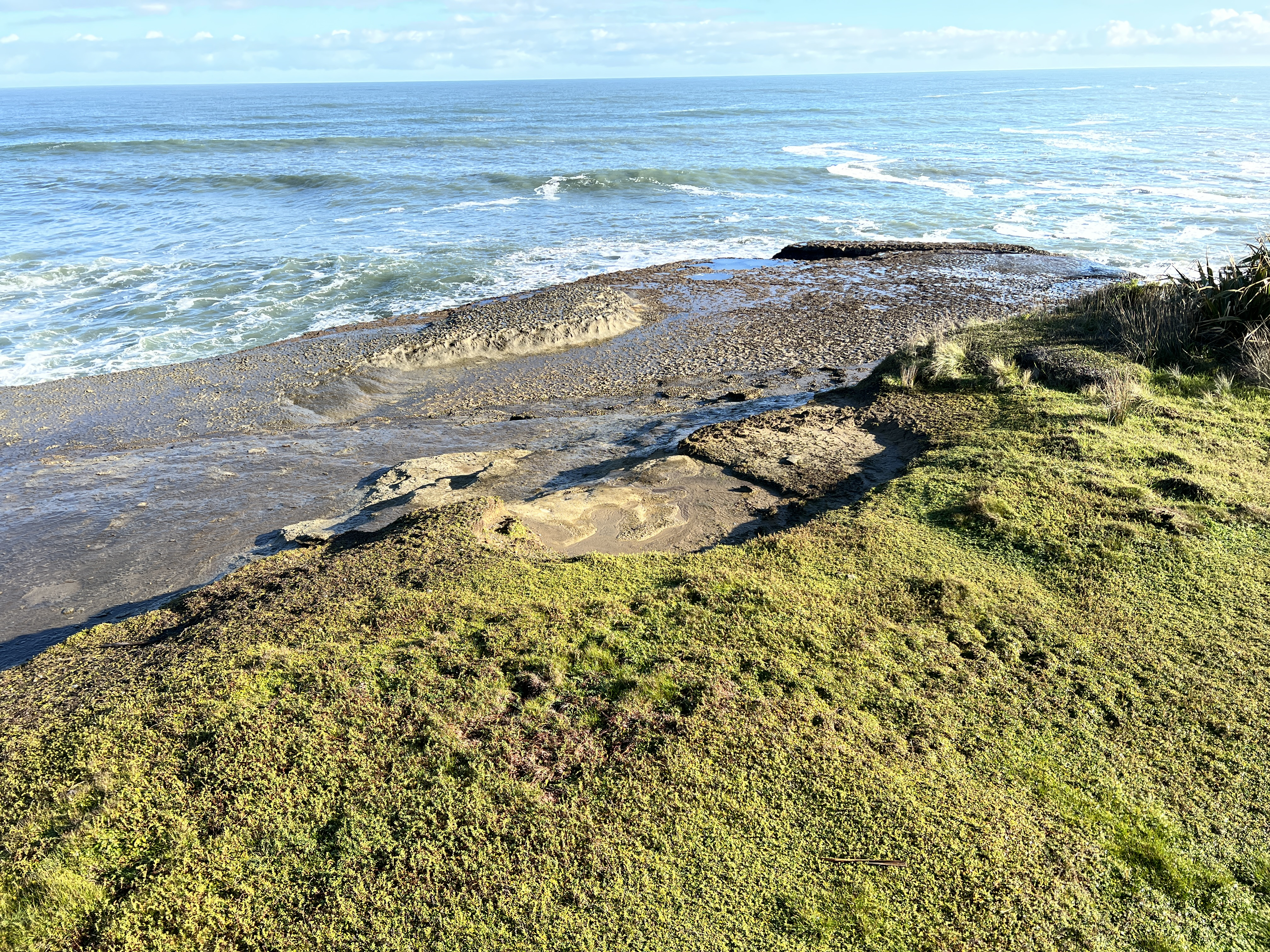
Coastal turf
Common forest species on Truman Track

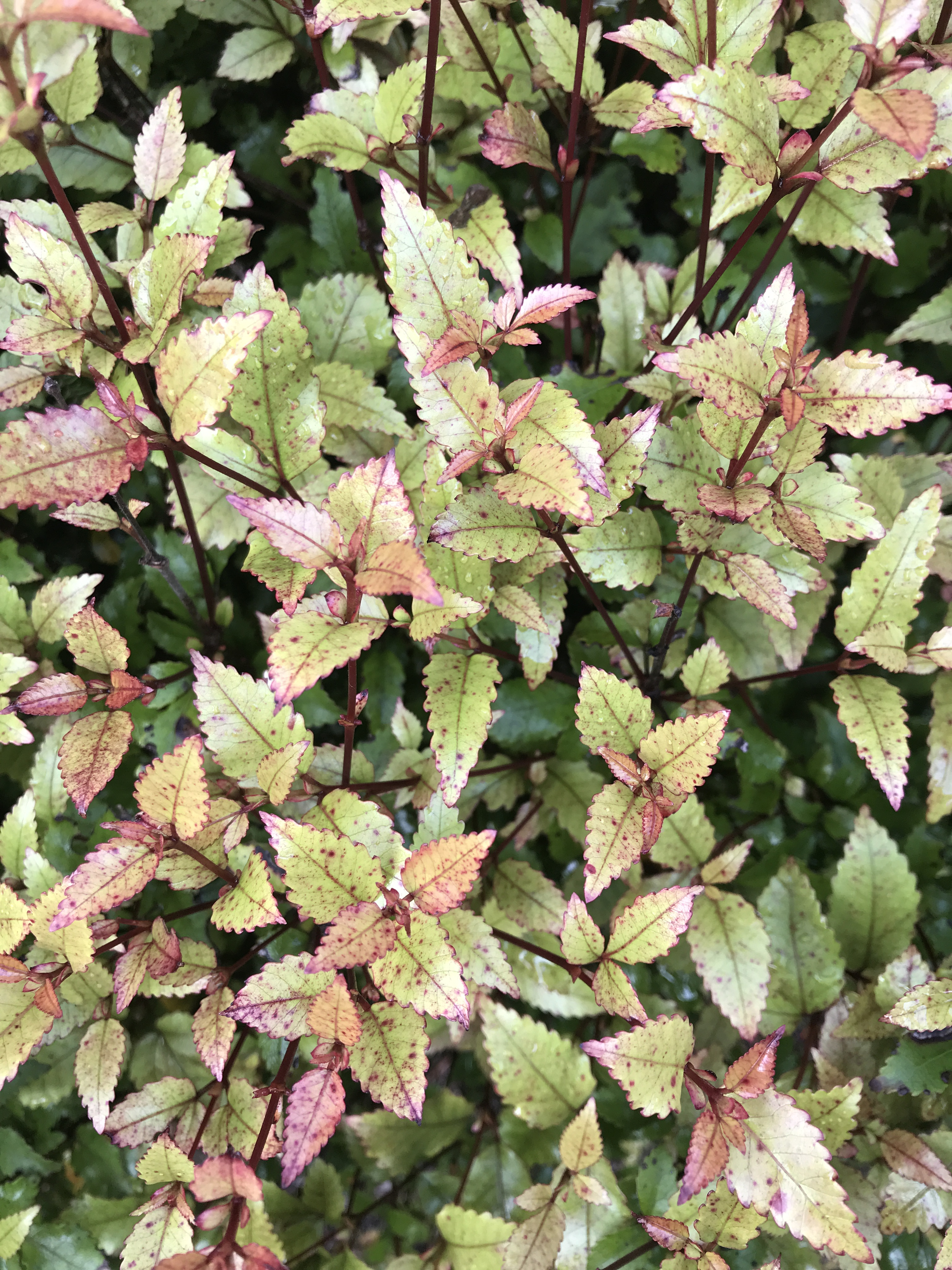
Kāmahi

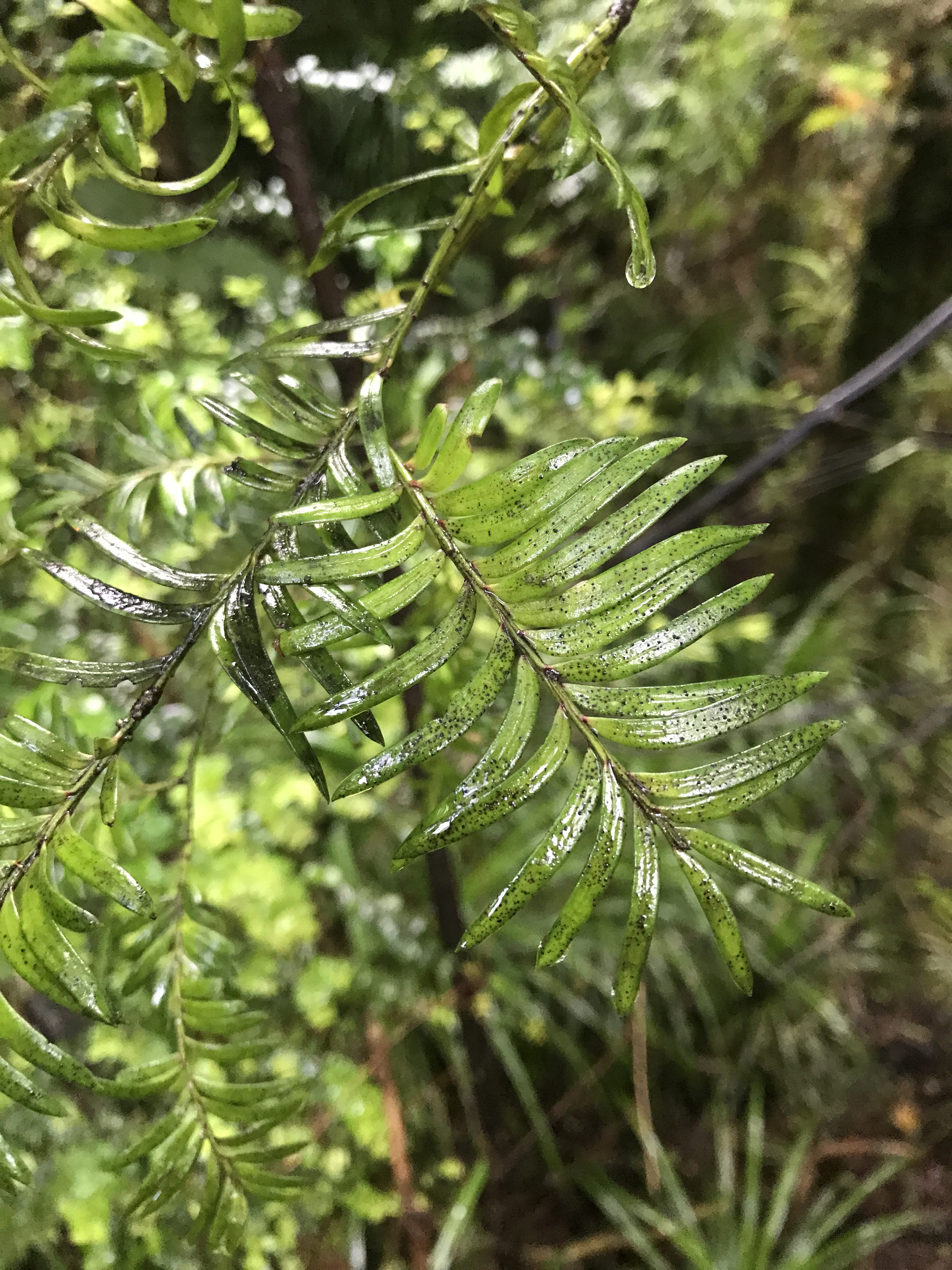
Miro

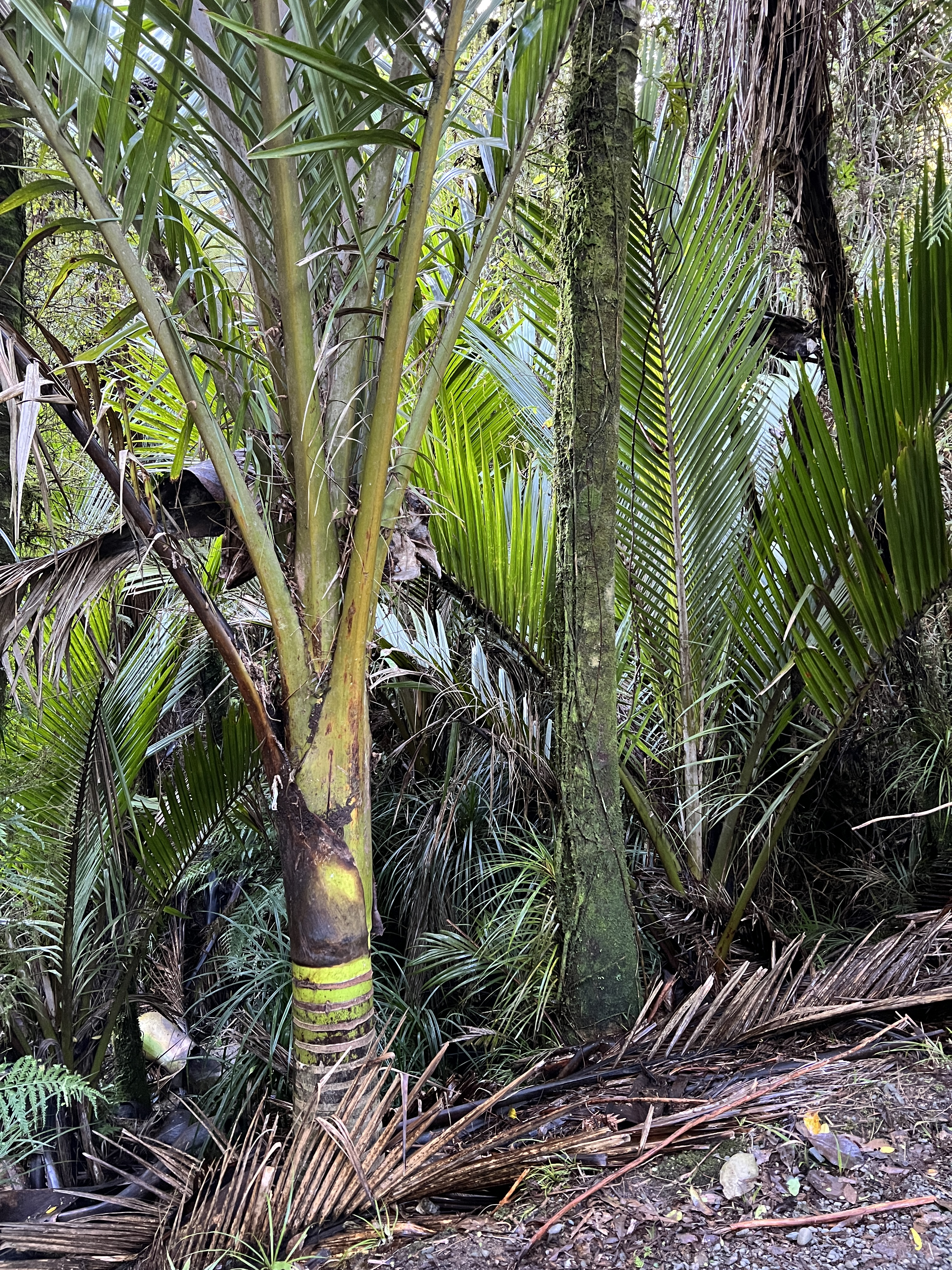
Nīkau

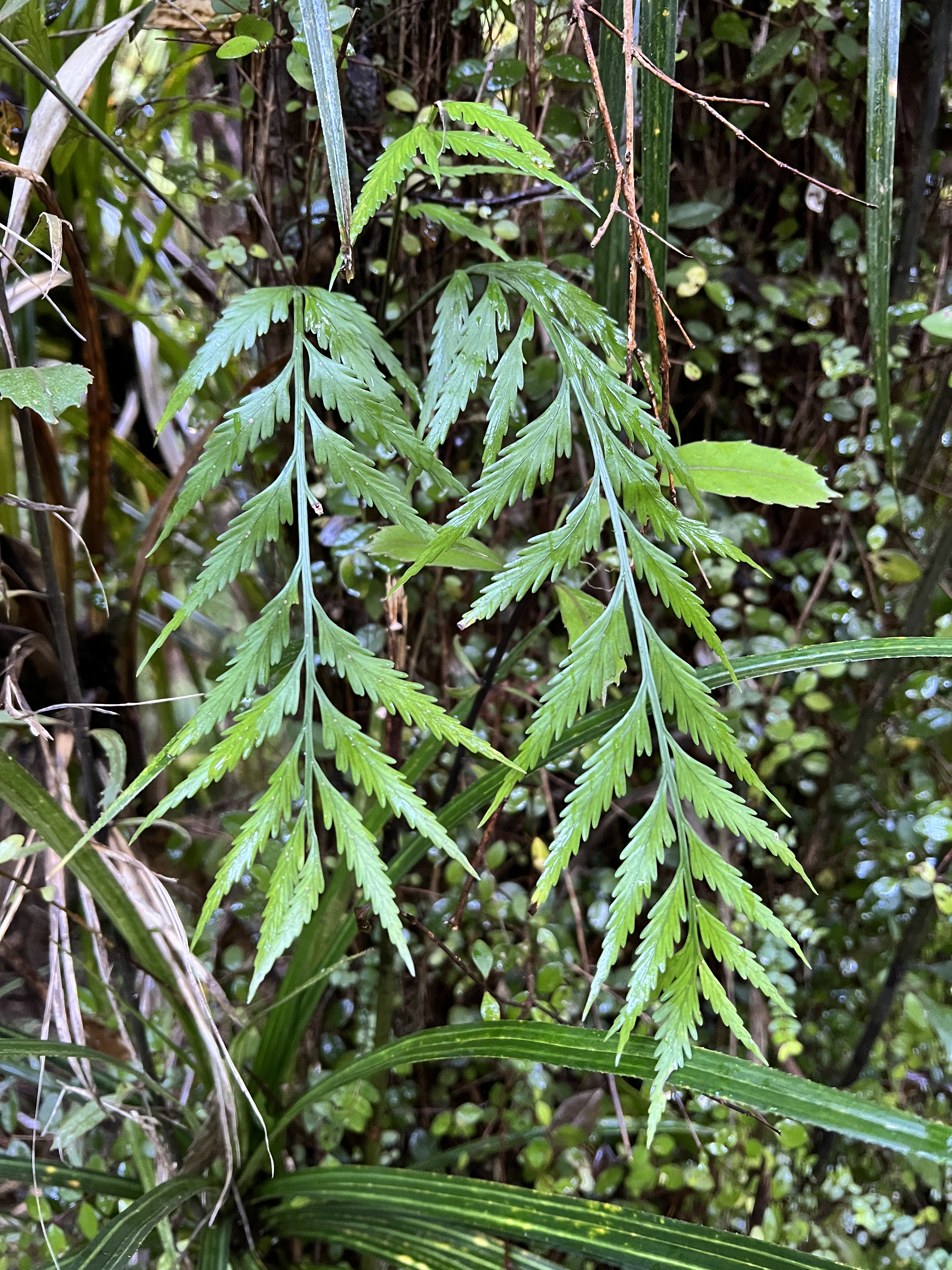
Asplenium flaccidum

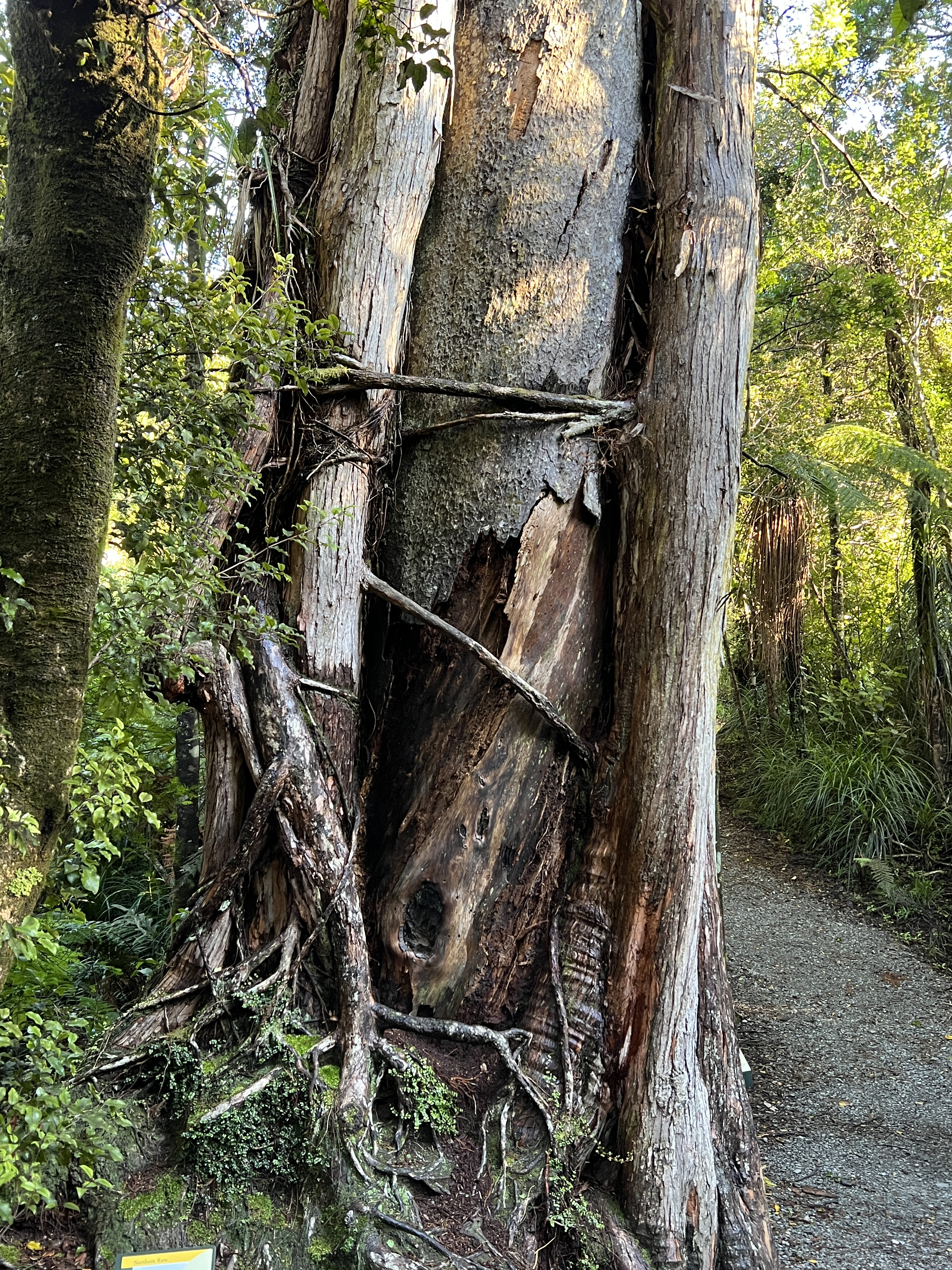
Northern rātā embracing mataī

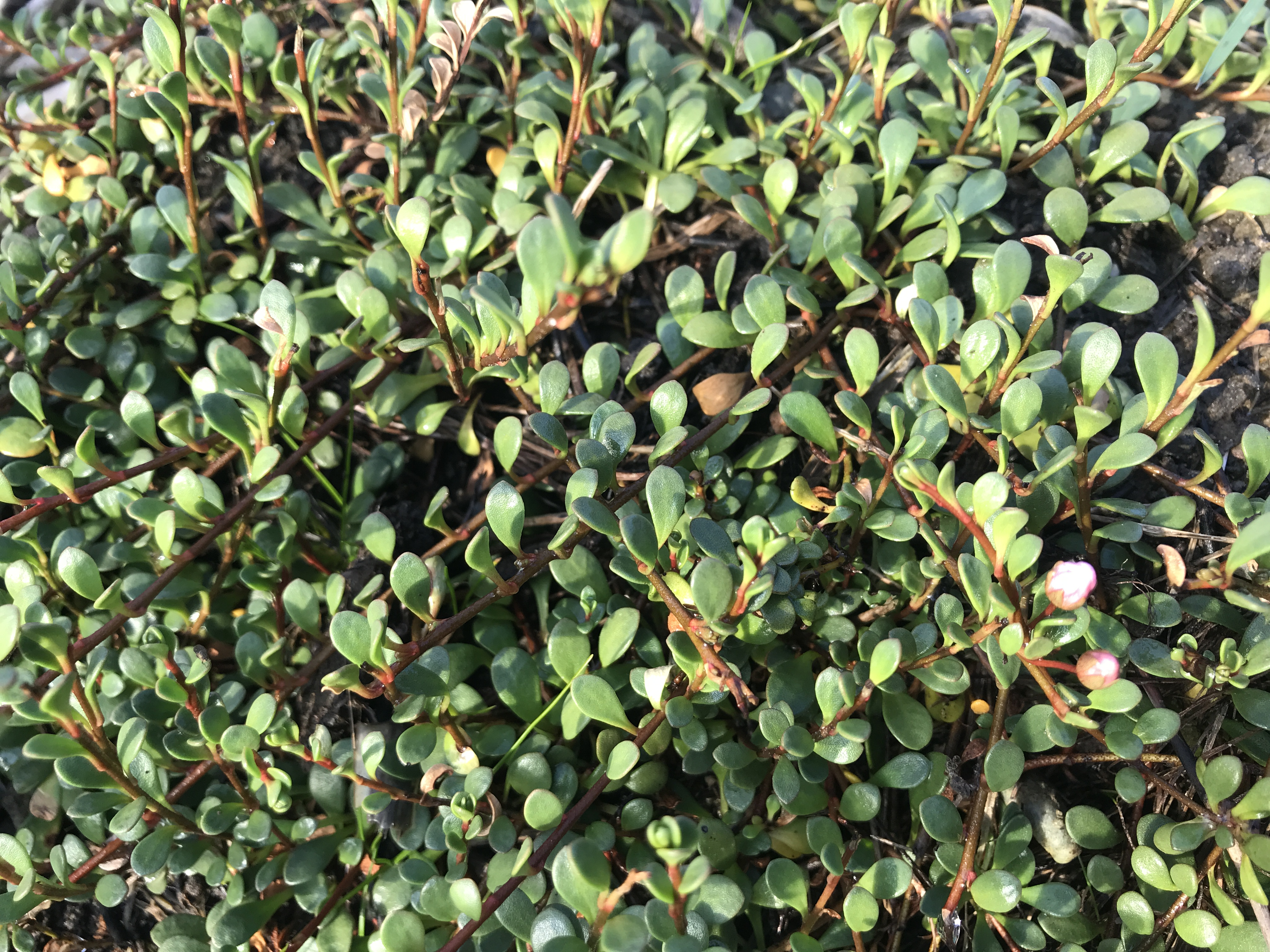
Sea primrose (Samolus repens)

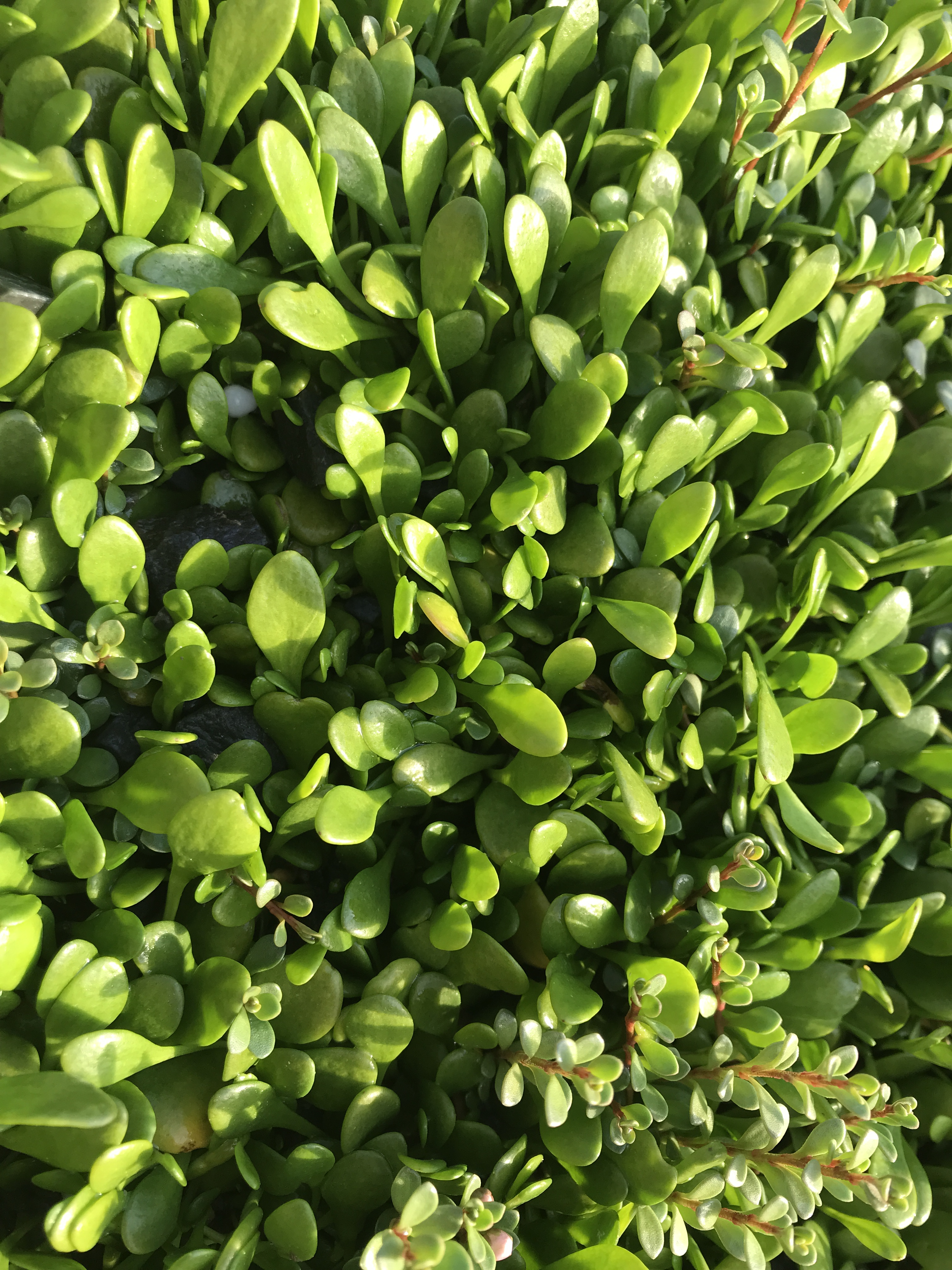
Selliera radicans

Towards the coast the forest canopy, now exposed to salt and sea wind, lowers and the dominant trees become toro, kāmahi, and tree ferns. The open clifftops are dominated by harakeke (Phormium tenax), but where the cliffs are most exposed to salt spray they are covered in a coastal turf, comprising mostly sea primrose (Samolus repens) and Selliera radicans.

== Tourism ==
The Truman Track is a popular tourist stop for visitors to the Buller region and the Pancake Rocks, with 37,000 visitors a year (even attracting 19,000 visitors in summer 2020–2021, when New Zealand's international borders were closed).

== Beach access controversy ==
In July 2019, a four-tonne block of Eocene sandstone sheared off an overhang and landed near the visitor stairway, and the track leading to the beach was closed for geotechnical assessment. The assessment determined that while the rest of the sandstone overhang was not about to fall, the cliff had natural weaknesses and could well gradually collapse over time. "Risk-taking" visitors had been observed crossing the safety fence to take selfies under the remains of the overhang. Although it was a significant geological feature and a registered site, the consultant's report recommended that the overhang be removed, ideally by hand in small blocks rather than by explosives which could cause further damage. The Department of Conservation (DOC) decided hand removal was unrealistic. After an independent assessment found water seepage and cracks in the cliff, DOC determined that the overhang was a significant public safety risk. In August 2019 a geotechnical firm used explosives in drilled holes to bring down around 70 tonnes of rock.

A subsequent geotechnical report found that the explosives had fractured the remaining cliff, which was revealed to be weaker than when first examined and still posed a danger to the public. Subsequent criticism of DOC's actions by conservation groups such as the Federated Mountain Clubs prompted an internal review, and an admission that there was insufficient consultation, and signage and barriers should have been used instead of removing the overhang completely. No geotechnical assessment of the overhang's safety had been done before building stairs and a small viewing platform underneath it.

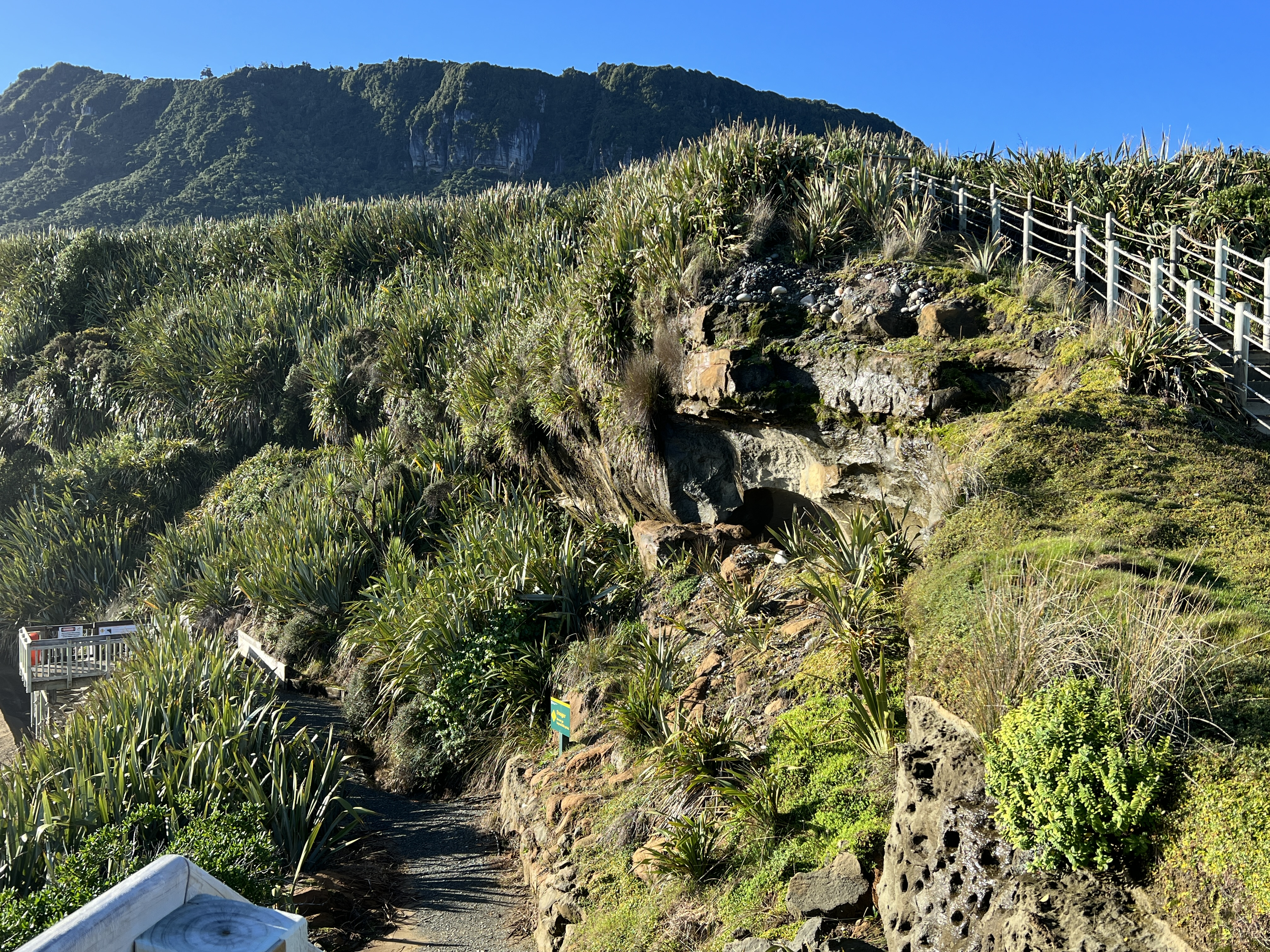
Beach access stairway after overhang removed

On 28 June 2021 two further sandstone blocks fell off the "remediated" overhang, so stairway access to the beach was closed off indefinitely and warning signs were installed. A geotechnical assessment after the rockfall found there was an unsupported one-tonne boulder poised above the track, and an increased chance of rockfall. Having been accused of a 'blast now, think later' mentality, DOC was then accused of being overly cautious for not removing the rock and restoring beach access. Others argued that the beach was intrinsically dangerous, with rogue waves and other dangerous cliffs and overhangs, and visitor infrastructure should be removed.
