= Punakaiki =

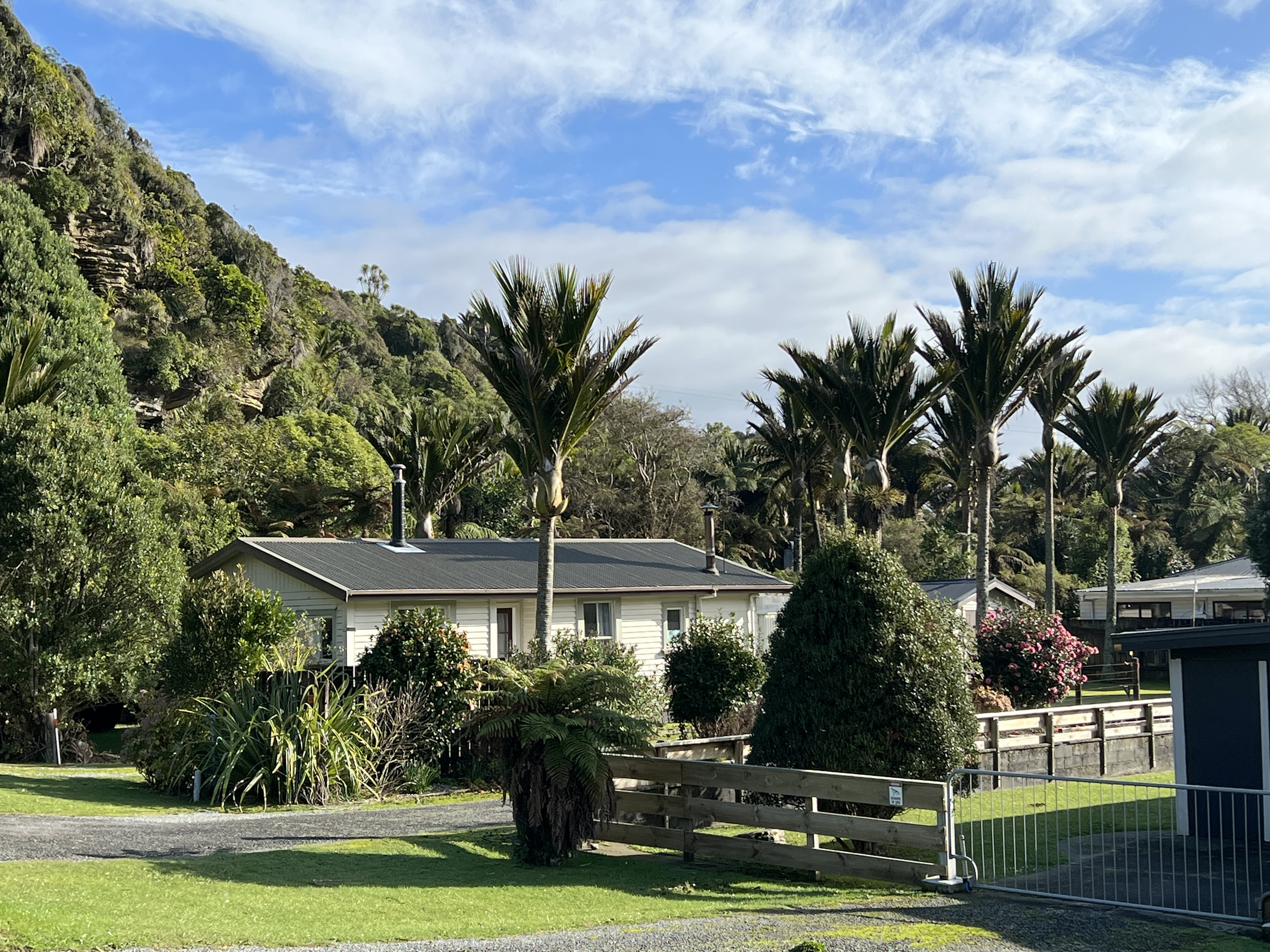

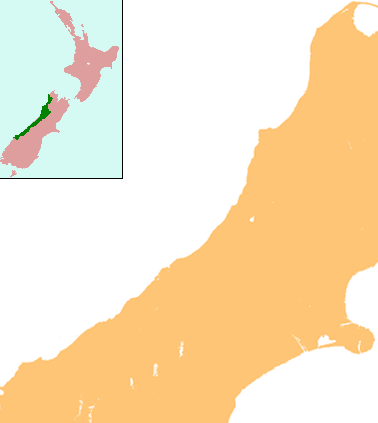
- Location within West Coast
- Coordinates: 42°6′30″S 171°20′10″E
- Country: New Zealand
- Region: West Coast
- District: Buller District
- Electorates: West Coast-Tasman; Te Tai Tonga

Punakaiki is a small village on the West Coast of the South Island of New Zealand. It is located between Westport and Greymouth on State Highway 6, the only through-road on the West Coast. Punakaiki is immediately adjacent to Paparoa National Park, and is also the access point for a popular visitor attraction, the Pancake Rocks and Blowholes.

== Location ==
Punakaiki is located on State Highway 6, and is 46.3 kilometres (28.8 mi) north of Greymouth and 56.3 kilometres (35.0 mi) south of Westport. Because State Highway 6 is the only through-road on the West Coast, a large number of visitors pass through the town.

The village is on the southern border of Buller District, where it meets Grey District, and lies on the edge of Paparoa National Park. To the north is the sheer bluff Perpendicular Point, known as Te Miko. The settlement sits to the south, by the Pororari Lagoon at the mouth of the Porarari River. To the south of the village is Dolomite Point, site of the Pancake Rocks, and Razorback Point at the mouth of the Punakaiki River. A feature of this part of the West Coast are the steep forested bluffs and cliffs of the Paparoa Range, descending several hundred metres to small beaches and sheer headlands, with occasional flats and terraces in between.

== History ==
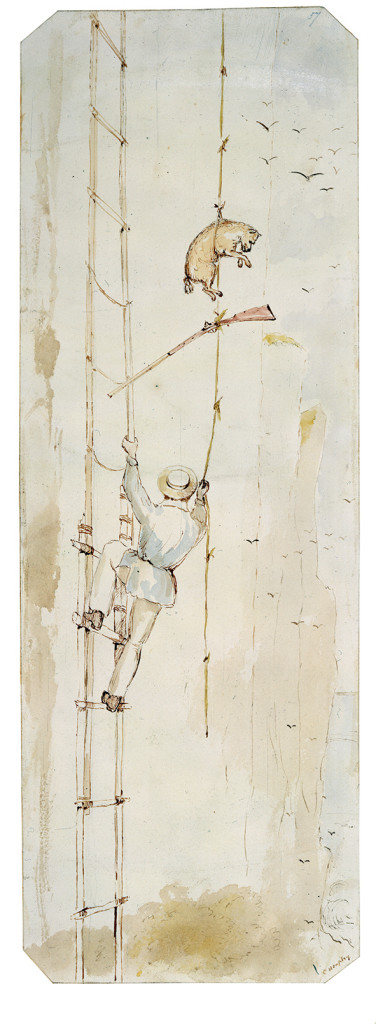
Charles Heaphy made this sketch of Thomas Brunner ascending Te Miko Cliff in 1846 with his Scottish terrier Rover being raised by a flax rope

The coastal caves and overhangs of the area bear traces of seasonal Māori occupation, and by the time Europeans arrived the area was the home of the Ngāti Waewae people, a hapū of Kāi Tahu, who traded much-prized pounamu.

Early European explorers navigating the coast encountered sheer cliffs at Te Miko, navigable only by climbing ladders totalling 46 feet high (or so Haast estimated) made of harakeke and rotting rātā vine. Charles Heaphy noted in 1846 that "…as several of the rotten steps gave way under our feet, our position was far from being pleasant. A number of cormorants and other marine birds, too, that had their nests in the crevices of the rock were screaming and wheeling about us at the intrusion." During the gold rush of the 1860s these were replaced by chain ladders, soon known as "Jacob's Ladder", but the wooden rungs were destroyed by overuse, and travellers slid down the chains instead or jammed sticks into the links.

There was, however, an inland trail crossing a higher terrace through rātā forest; prospector William Smart was guided through it by local Māori to avoid the "rotten" ladders. By October 1866, the authorities had cut a track to avoid the ladders, but it soon degenerated into a morass. In 1867, under-employed "diggers"(prospectors) were used to cut the "Razorback Road", now known as the Inland Pack Track, to avoid the coast completely, heading up the Fox River, south through rough hill country, and emerging at the mouth of the Punakaiki River. The route which linked Cobden, north of Greymouth, with the gold workings at Brighton on the mouth of the Fox River, cost perhaps £10,000 and was completed by October 1867, but was not a success: it required too many river crossings that were difficult in times of flood, and after the gold rush ended and the diggers moved on it fell into disrepair. In January 1873, the Grey River Argus called the road "perfectly useless" and it was little-used after the 1870s.

Travellers who crossed Te Miko plateau stopped at the Pororari River lagoon, and waited for low tide to cross the mudflats (while avoiding quicksand). A dry limestone overhang on the north side of the lagoon was a convenient place to wait, and became known as the "Post Office", because diggers would leave messages and carve their names into the walls. As late as 1931, graffiti like "Sandy 1866" and "Hamilton Nov 20/65" were still visible.

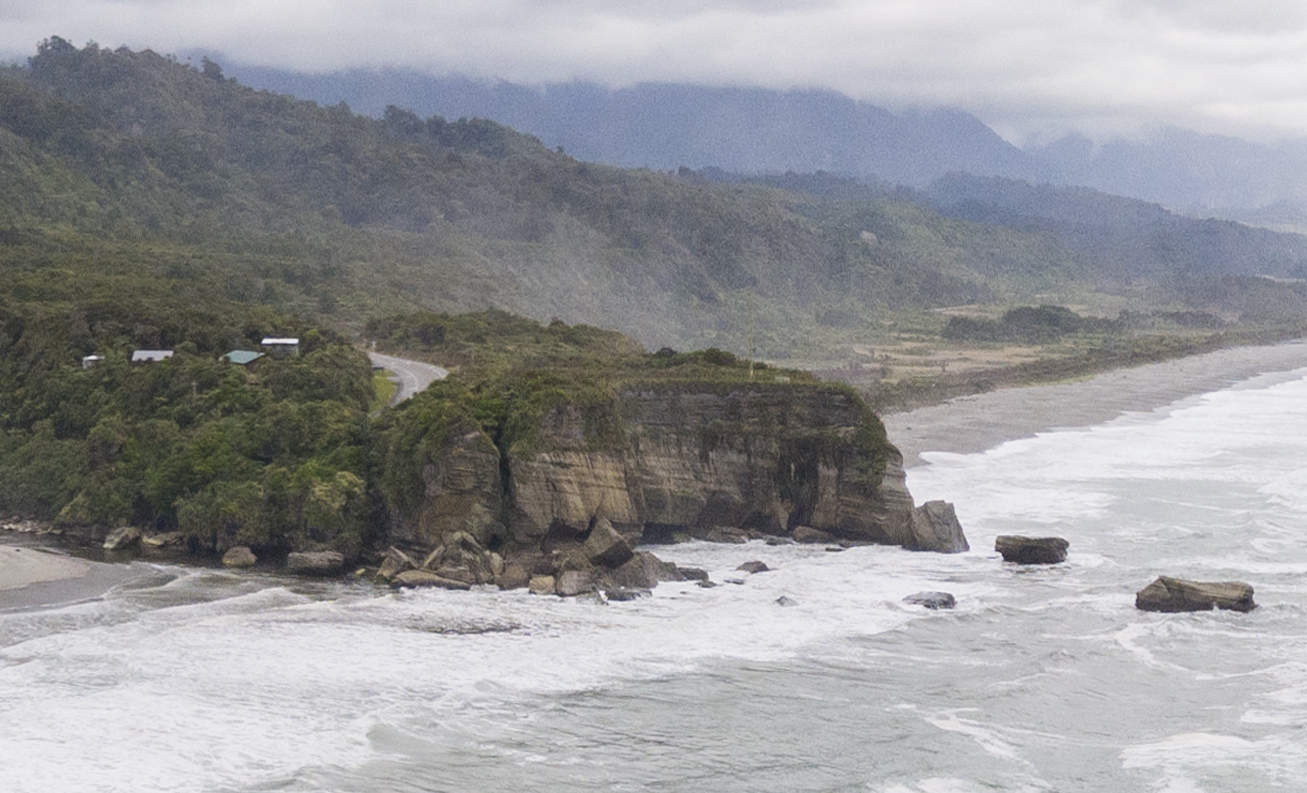
Razorback Point

After crossing what is now the site of Punakaiki, the path continued over the Dolomite Point headland and descended to the Punakaiki River. Early travellers did not record or comment on the Pancake Rock formations, which are just 15 minutes from the track, and Māori did not appear to have highlighted them to early European explorers. Those heading south to the diggings at Canoe Creek still had to navigate the Razorback, navigating a narrow path between a deep chasm on one side and a sheer drop to the beach on the other. A vehicular road was not built here until 1929, finally connecting Greymouth and Westport.

In 2018, the remnants of Cyclone Fehi caused severe damage to the road immediately north of Dolomite point. Improvements costing $7.8 million were completed by Waka Kotahi NZ Transport Agency to provide more resilience to this section of State Highway 6.

== Population ==
There are fewer than 100 permanent residents, but the village has been host to at least 500,000 visitors in some years.

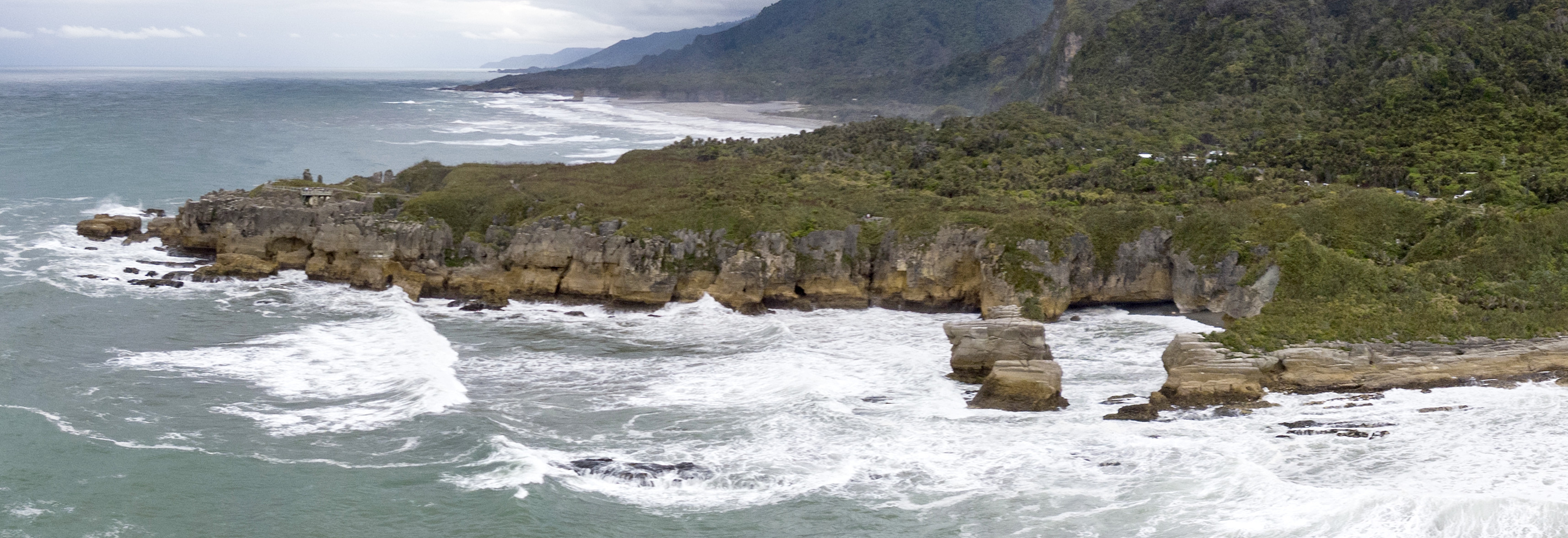
Dolomite Point, Punakaiki, with the Pancake Rocks at the tip

== Wildlife and conservation ==
Located on the edge of the Paparoa National Park, Punakaiki has a diverse range of birdlife and marine wildlife. Fur seals are seen on the rocks and Hector's dolphins close to the shore. Birds seen in the area include blue penguin, blue shag, black shag, Australasian gannet, white-faced heron, weka, kererū, tūī, bellbird, fantail, grey warbler, and tomtit.

The Westland petrel has its only known breeding colonies close to Punakaiki. The breeding range is in forest-covered coastal foothills in an 8 kilometre wide strip between Barrytown and Punakaiki, specifically between the Punakaiki River and Waiwhero (Lawson) Creek. These colonies were established in the middle of the 18th century. The Department of Conservation designated the colony area as the Westland Petrel Special Protected Area in 1999 and access by the public is restricted. There is a breeding colony located on private land, where guided tours of the colony are available.

Limestone caves in the Punakaiki area preserved animal fossils dating back 25,000 years which help us visualize the fauna of the Otira Glaciation period. This fauna includes a variety of large and smalls (including moas), amphibians, reptiles, and potentially bats and kiwi.

Local conservation efforts include the Punakaiki Coastal Restoration Project which was started by the Department of Conservation, aluminum production company Rio Tinto, and Conservation Volunteers in 2009. The project covers 40 ha and is 4 km south of Punakaiki. The intention is to restore the Sand Forest Flats and provide a forest to sea corridor. The land is owned by the Department of Conservation.

== Climate ==
Located on the West Coast of New Zealand's South Island, Punakaiki has an oceanic climate with prevailing westerlies, which accounts for the strong maritime influence on the local climate and the high annual rainfall, amplified by the Paparoa Range immediately to the east. Mean minimum temperatures throughout the year are higher than any other West Coast location, giving the Punakaiki area a distinct lack of frost; no month has a mean temperature below 10 °C (50 °F), lending a subtropical note to the climate.

Climate data for Punakaiki Rocks (1991–2020)
Month	Jan	Feb	Mar	Apr	May	Jun	Jul	Aug	Sep	Oct	Nov	Dec	Year
Mean daily maximum °C (°F)	21.2 (70.2)	21.4 (70.5)	20.2 (68.4)	17.9 (64.2)	15.7 (60.3)	13.7 (56.7)	13.4 (56.1)	13.9 (57.0)	15.3 (59.5)	16.3 (61.3)	17.9 (64.2)	19.4 (66.9)	17.2 (62.9)
Daily mean °C (°F)	17.6 (63.7)	17.9 (64.2)	16.7 (62.1)	14.6 (58.3)	12.8 (55.0)	10.8 (51.4)	10.2 (50.4)	10.7 (51.3)	12.0 (53.6)	13.0 (55.4)	14.5 (58.1)	16.1 (61.0)	13.9 (57.0)
Mean daily minimum °C (°F)	14.0 (57.2)	14.3 (57.7)	13.1 (55.6)	11.4 (52.5)	9.9 (49.8)	7.9 (46.2)	7.1 (44.8)	7.5 (45.5)	8.7 (47.7)	9.7 (49.5)	11.0 (51.8)	12.7 (54.9)	10.6 (51.1)
Average rainfall mm (inches)	223.1 (8.78)	181.7 (7.15)	181.8 (7.16)	168.9 (6.65)	211.4 (8.32)	272.0 (10.71)	179.2 (7.06)	266.4 (10.49)	228.3 (8.99)	247.9 (9.76)	238.1 (9.37)	258.4 (10.17)	2,657.2 (104.61)
Source: NIWA

== Tourism ==
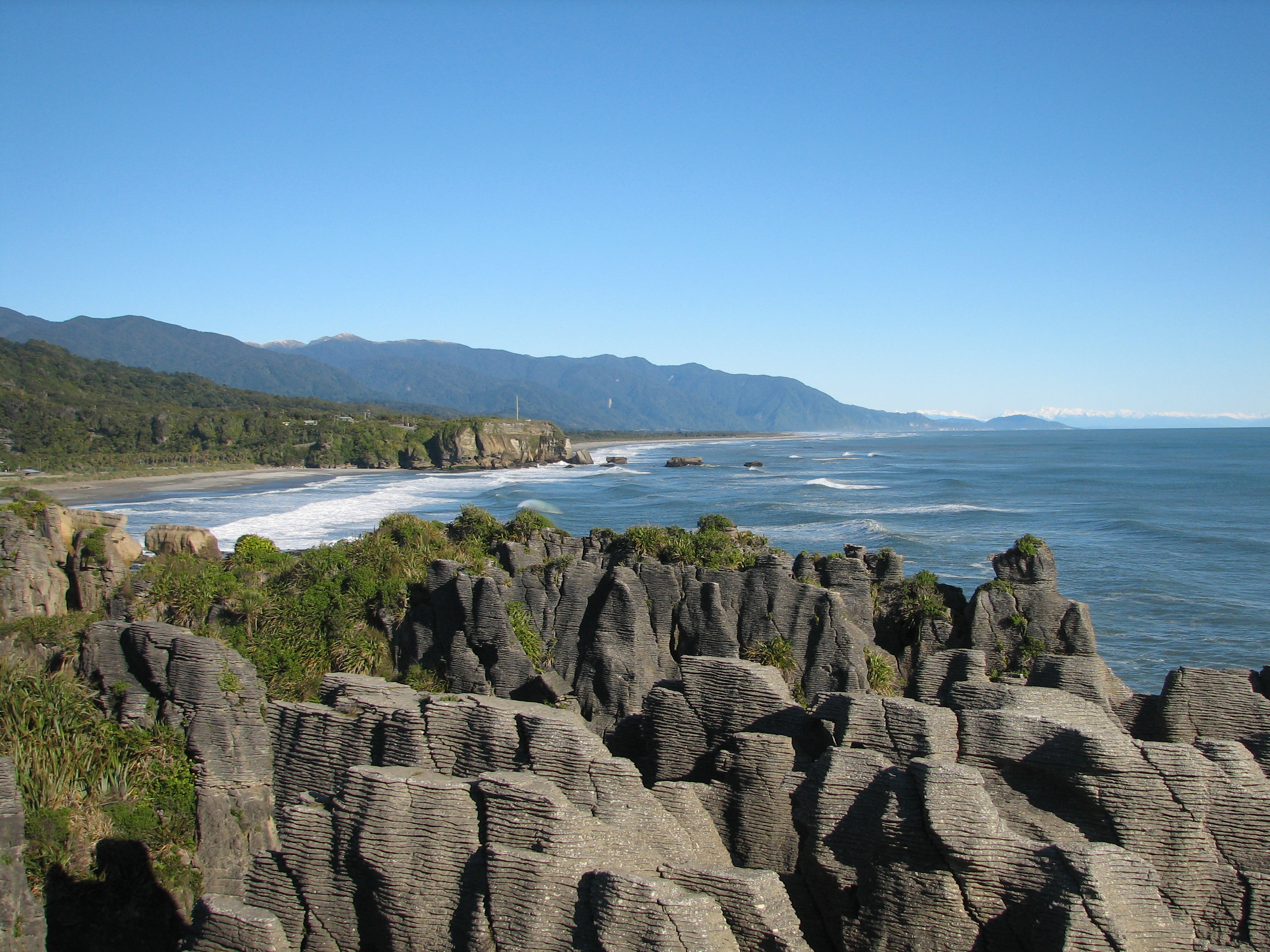
Pancake Rocks - looking south

In the period immediately before the COVID-19 pandemic, around 500,000 visitors each year passed through Punakaiki, and most stopped at Dolomite Point to walk out and view the Pancake Rocks and Blowholes. The peak visitor numbers were around 6,000 a day. Overseas visitors made up 92% of the business at the local Punakaiki tavern, and 85% at the Punakaiki campground. The large number of visitors to the small village has put a strain on local infrastructure, and requires levels of investment that cannot be funded by the small number of ratepayers. Some of the main concerns were the inadequate provision of car parks and toilet facilities to meet demand at peak times.

There had also been concerns from the local community about the behaviour and impact of "freedom campers" – those who stay the night in their cars or campervans in a public place, rather than the campground. In 2016, residents petitioned the Buller District and Grey District councils for a ban on freedom camping in the town, but this appeal was not successful.

On 19 March 2020, all New Zealand's borders and entry ports were closed to non-residents in response to the pandemic. Staged re-opening of the borders did not begin until February 2022. With New Zealand's borders being closed for such an extended period, local tourism operators in Punakaiki had to adjust to lower volumes, and to refocus on attracting domestic visitors.

In January 2022, the campground operators reported that they had been fully booked over the Christmas holiday season, with most of the visitors from the South Island, and many coming to do the Paparoa Track. However, tourism operators reported major reductions in bookings for the period after the summer school holidays.

=== Visitor centre ===
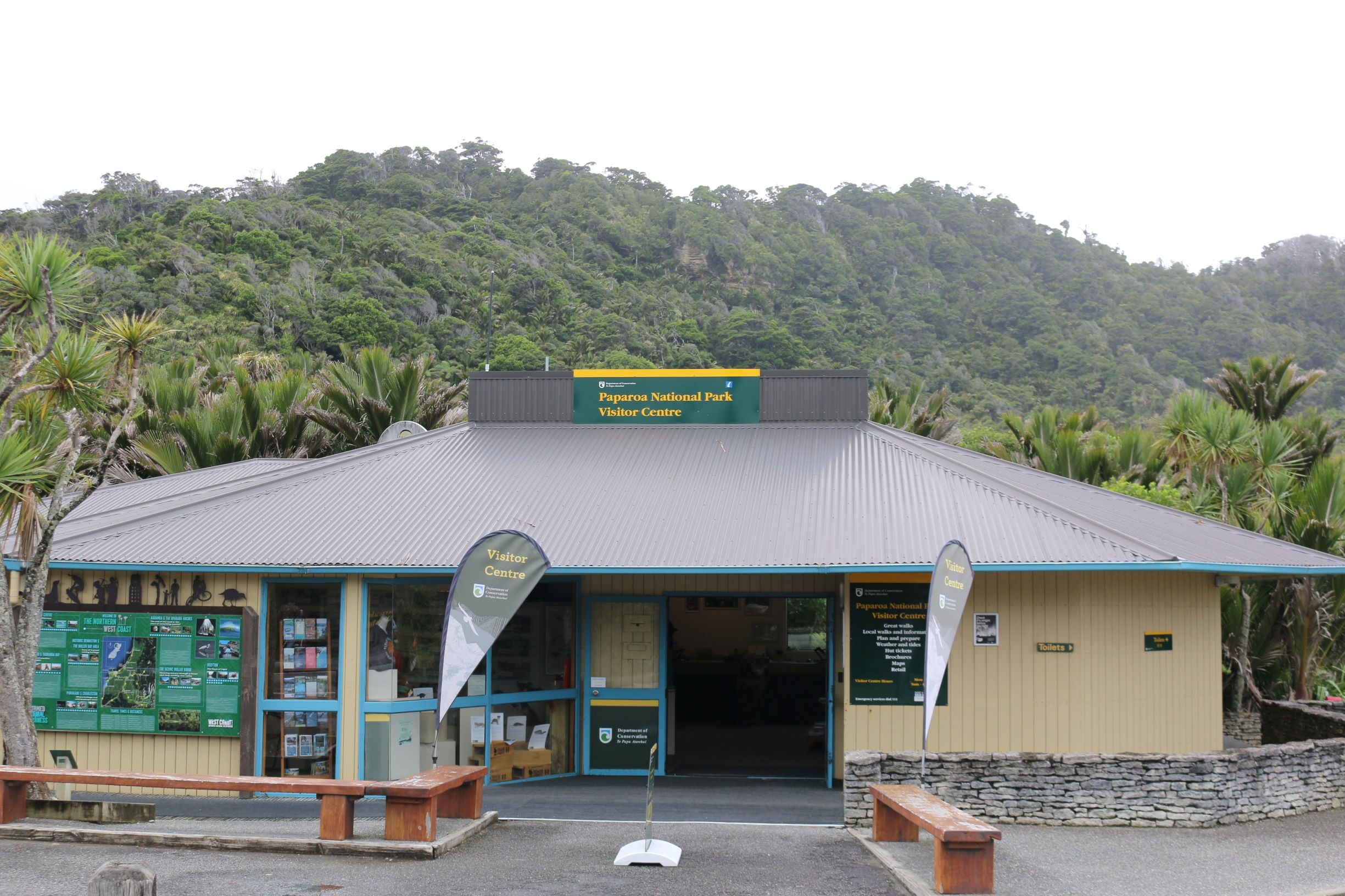
Paparoa National Park Visitor Centre in 2021

The Paparoa National Park visitor centre is located at Dolomite Point, opposite the entrance to the Pancake Rocks & Blowholes.

In September 2020, as part of an economic stimulus in response to the pandemic, the Government announced a grant from the Provincial Growth Fund for redevelopment of visitor facilities at Punakaiki. The $26 million project included a new visitor centre, Department of Conservation (DOC) information centre, community meeting room, and offices for the local hapū, Ngāti Waewae. There was also funding for a highway crossing and car park, and a walking and cycling path to improve accessibility for visitors. One unusual aspect of the plans for the "Experience Centre" was a green roof. Seeds and seedlings of around a dozen species chosen for the roof were gathered from the local area and 11,000 plants were raised in a Conservation Volunteers New Zealand nursery at Barrytown Flats for subsequent establishment on the roof of the building. There was controversy in 2021 about the decision to transfer the facility to Ngāti Waewae on completion, and plans for charging visitors for entry to the "Experience Centre". A ceremony to mark the start of construction on the new visitor cente was led by Ngāti Waewae on 28 May 2022.

=== Pancake Rocks ===
The Pancake Rocks are a very popular tourist destination at Dolomite Point south of the main village. From a visitor centre and cafe a wheelchair-navigable path leads to the stylobedded pancake rock formations and central Putai Blowhole, which spouts spectacularly at high tide and during a south-westerly swell.

=== Punakaiki cavern ===
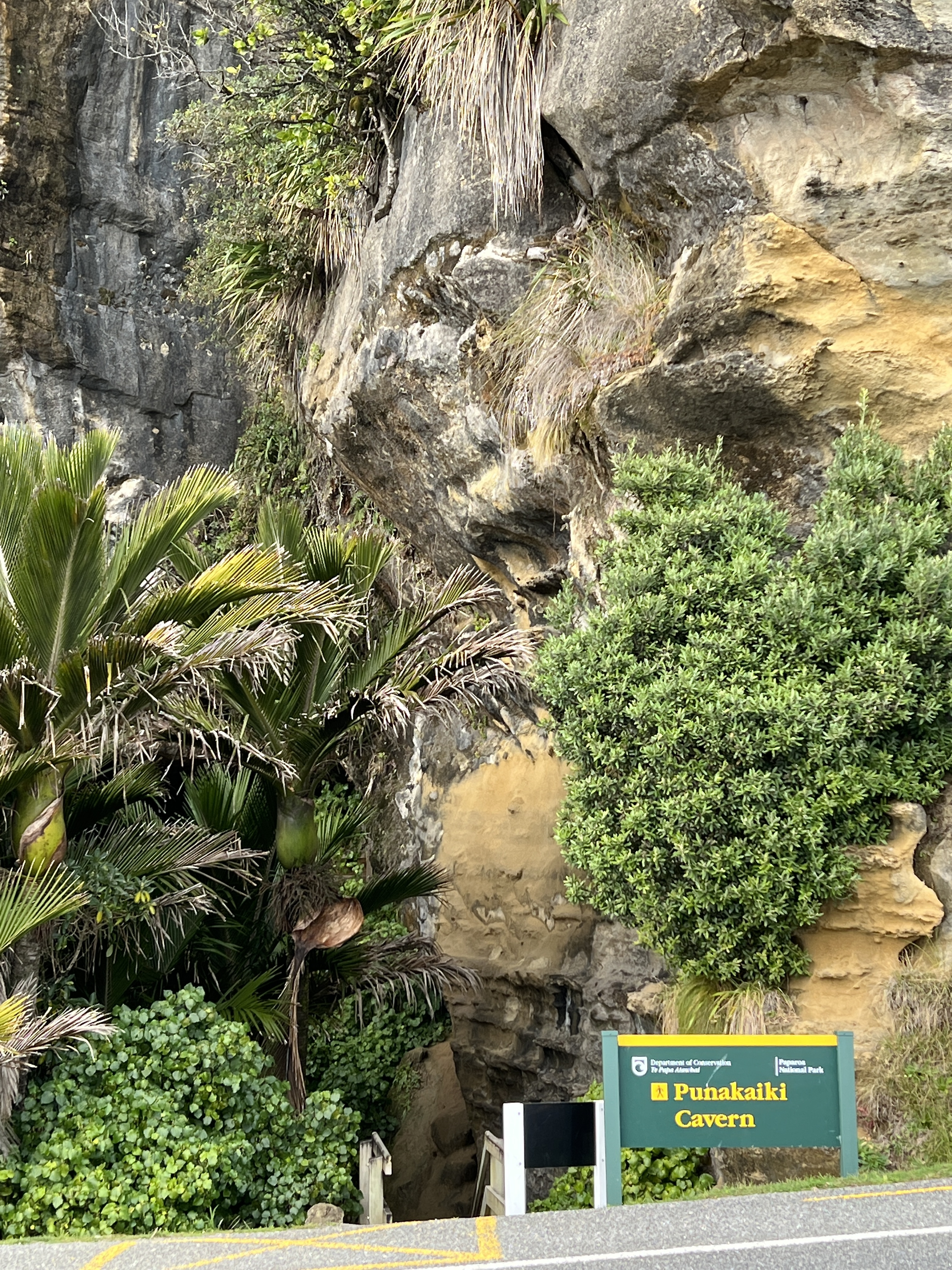
Punakaiki Cavern

One of the nearby attractions in Punakaiki is an easily accessible cavern. There is around 130 metres (430 ft) of passageways, with stalactites and glow worms. The cavern is located just off State Highway 6, around 500 metres (1,600 ft) north of the visitor centre.

=== Walks in the local area ===
Popular local walks in the Punakaiki area include:

- Pancake Rocks and Blowholes
- Truman Track
- Pororari River
- Punakaki River, and a Pororari River loop via the Inland Pack Track
- Pororari River, and a Bullock Creek loop via the Inland Pack Track
- Cave Creek / Kotihotiho Memorial Track

Punakaiki also provides access to the Paparoa Track, a 55 kilometres (34 mi), 2–3 day mountain bike or tramping track that crosses the Paparoa Range. The track is the tenth New Zealand Great Walk to be created, and has been fully open since 1 March 2020.
