= Perpendicular (disambiguation) =

Perpendicular is the relationship between two lines which meet at a right angle.

Perpendicular may also refer to:

== Mathematics ==
- Perpendicular axis theorem

== Medical ==
- Perpendicular plate of ethmoid bone
- Perpendicular plate of palatine bone

== Places ==
- Perpendicular Gothic architecture style of mediaeval Gothic architecture in the Kingdom of England
- Perpendicular Point, New Zealand

== Other uses ==
- Perpendicular recording, disc drive technology

== See also ==
- Point Perpendicular, New South Wales, Australia
- Purpendicular, music album by Deep Purple
