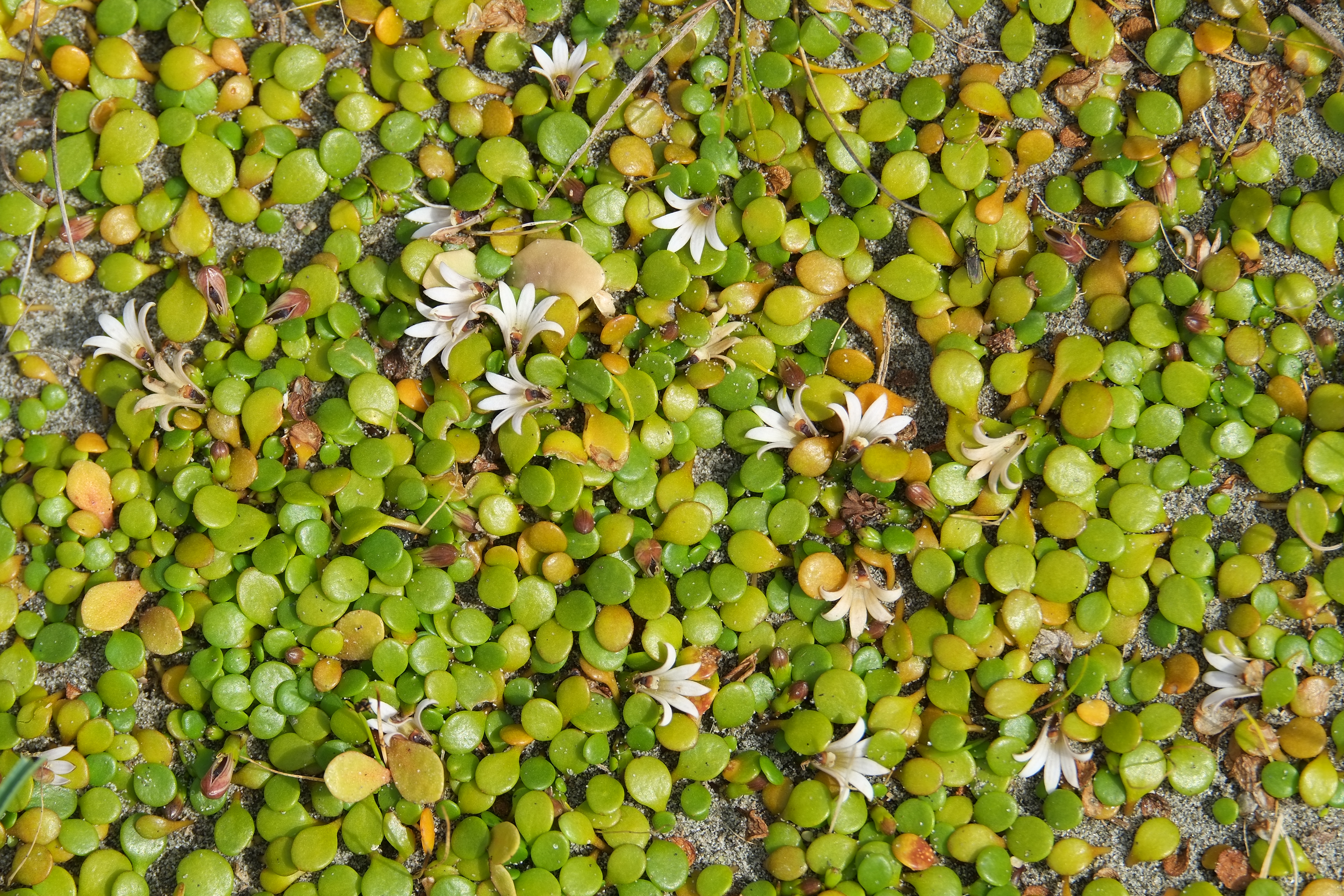

Scientific classification
- Kingdom: Plantae
- Clade: Tracheophytes
- Clade: Angiosperms
- Clade: Eudicots
- Clade: Asterids
- Order: Asterales
- Family: Goodeniaceae
- Genus: Goodenia
- Species: G. heenanii

Binomial name
- Goodenia heenanii K.A.Sheph.

= Goodenia heenanii =

Species of plant

Goodenia heenanii, or half star, is a species of Goodenia. It is the only endemic Goodenia species to New Zealand, as Goodenia radicans is also indigenous to Australia and is known from South America.

== Description ==
A small prostrate herb that has flowers with petals arranged in a half-circle.

== Range and habitat ==
Grows exclusively on dunes in the Manawatu coast.

== Etymology ==
Goodenia heenanii was named after the New Zealand botanist Peter Heenan (b. 1961).
