= Pancake Rocks and Blowholes =

Coastal rock formation in New Zealand

Pancake Rocks
- Rock formation and Blowholes
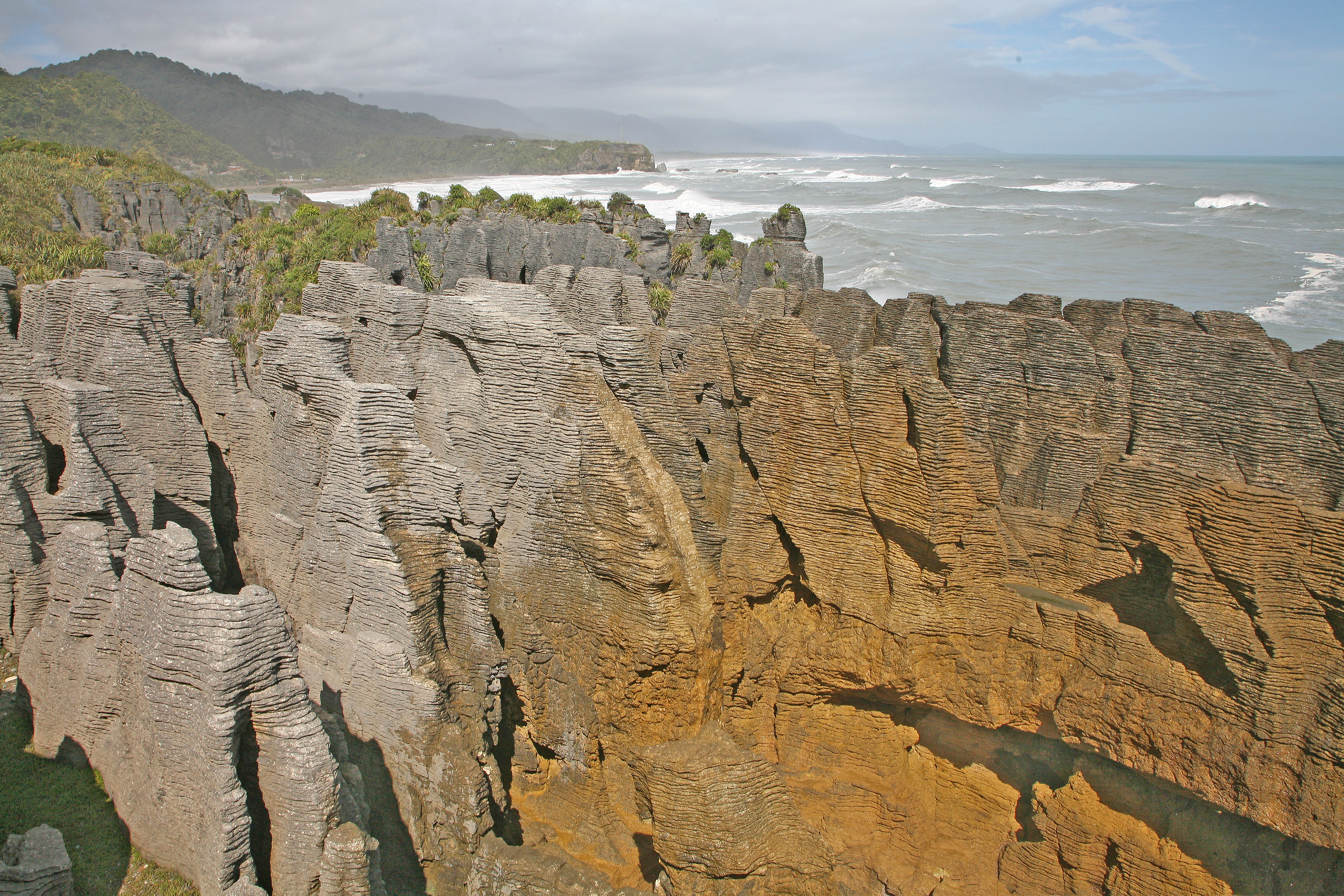
- Looking south across Pancake Rocks

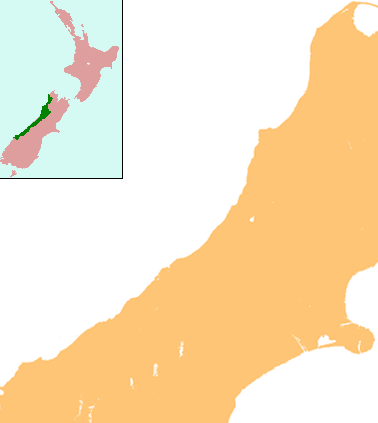
- Coordinates: 42°06′50″S 171°19′34″E
- Location: Punakaiki
- Offshore water bodies: Tasman Sea
- Age: Oligocene
- Topo map: Topo50 map BS19

The Pancake Rocks and Blowholes are a coastal rock formation at Punakaiki on the West Coast of the South Island of New Zealand. They are a popular visitor attraction.

== Location ==
The Pancake Rocks and Blowholes are located at Dolomite Point, immediately adjacent to the village of Punakaiki, in an area that is protected and forms part of the Paparoa National Park.

== Geology ==
The limestone of the Pancake Rocks has been uplifted by geologic forces and then eroded into the current landforms by a combination of two processes – karst erosion (a slow process where chemical erosion of the limestone occurs through the action of water flowing in joints and caverns), and coastal erosion (including the collapse of caverns).

=== Limestone formation ===
The Pancake Rocks are a heavily eroded limestone formation where the sea bursts through several vertical blowholes during incoming swells, particularly at high tide. The limestone was formed in the Oligocene period (around 22–30 million years old), a period in the geological history of New Zealand where most of the continent of Zealandia was submerged beneath shallow seas. The limestone rocks of the Punakaiki region began forming on the sea floor in warm coastal waters, offshore from a group of low-lying islands. There was a great profusion and diversity of marine organisms growing in these waters, and when these animals died, their shells settled on the sea floor along with small amounts of sand and mud eroded from nearby islands. Over millions of years, vast quantities of shell debris accumulated on the sea floor, eventually forming a thick deposit of nearly pure calcium carbonate.

About 25 million years ago, at the beginning of the Miocene, there was a phase of upward movement of the Earth's crust (known as the Kaikoura Orogeny), that led to the formation of the Southern Alps. Large amounts of sand and mud were eroded from the emerging land and deposited on the sea floor, on top of the shell debris. Over the following 20 million years, as the uplift of the crust continued, the older shell debris became buried under a great thickness of accumulated sand and mud. The high pressures created by the new layers expelled water from the shelly sediment, and this gradually became cemented and lithified to form limestone rock. In the Pliocene, a few million years ago, the Kaikoura Orogeny led to slow folding and faulting of sedimentary layers in the Paparoa region, raising them above sea level. Following this uplift, erosion processes stripped away most of the sedimentary rocks which covered the region. However, at Punakaiki, a downwarping of the crust preserved much of the sedimentary layers. Where the limestone now appears at the surface at Dolomite Point, erosion has removed all the younger mudstones and sandstones. Subsequent erosion of the limestone headland has created the unusual karst landscape.

=== The pancake appearance ===
The regular layering that can be observed in the Pancake Rocks results from a process called stylobedding. Under the influence of high pressure and compaction, small imperfections in the calcium carbonate that forms the limestone tend to aggregate in horizontal planes, in a process known as grain boundary diffusion. This leads to regular bands of stronger rock separated by weaker and more erodable mudstone rock. Thousands of years of rain, wind and spray have mechanically weathered away the surface of the mudstone layers, leaving the limestone layers in relief.

=== Continuing uplift ===
Uplift of the crust is continuing and its recent effects can be seen at Dolomite Point. The flat surface of the headland is in fact an old beach surface, formed at sea level 100,000 years ago and since uplifted by around 35 metres (115 ft). Patches of beach gravel and sand can be found on the headland.

== Blowholes ==
The blowholes at Dolomite Point, Punakaiki have been formed through combined processes of erosion. The action of waves, combined with karst erosion in joints and faults in the limestone rock, leads to the creation of caverns that become sea caves. When the sea cave erodes upwards and towards the land, it can create an opening to the surface. Incoming waves trap air in the sea cave and the air inside the cave becomes compressed, leading to the ejection of air and water upwards from the top of the blowhole. The activity level of the blowhole depends on factors like tide, sea conditions and the geometry of the caverns. The best conditions for viewing the blowholes are at high tide when there is a large incoming ocean swell.

== Tourism ==
State Highway 6 is the only through-road on the West Coast, and a large number of visitors pass through Punakaiki. In 2017, it was estimated that there were 450,000 visitors, and many of these take the short walk to view the Pancake Rocks and Blowholes. It has been claimed that the Pancake Rocks are the most photographed rock formations in New Zealand.

The site is accessible by a number of walkways winding through the rock formations. Parts of these are wheelchair-accessible and others are carved into stairways up and down the rock faces.

Pancake Rocks and Blowholes

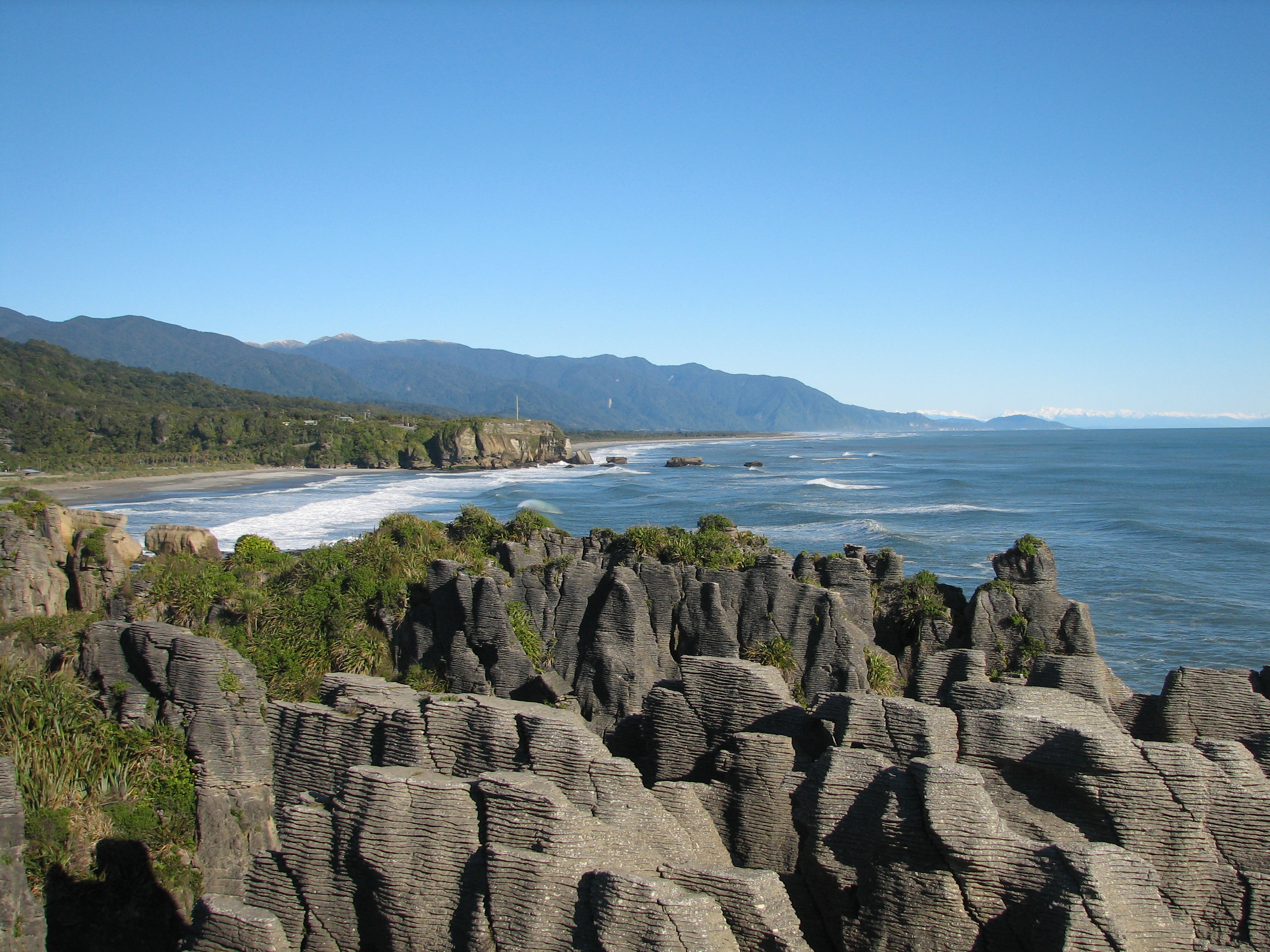
Looking south from the Pancake Rocks

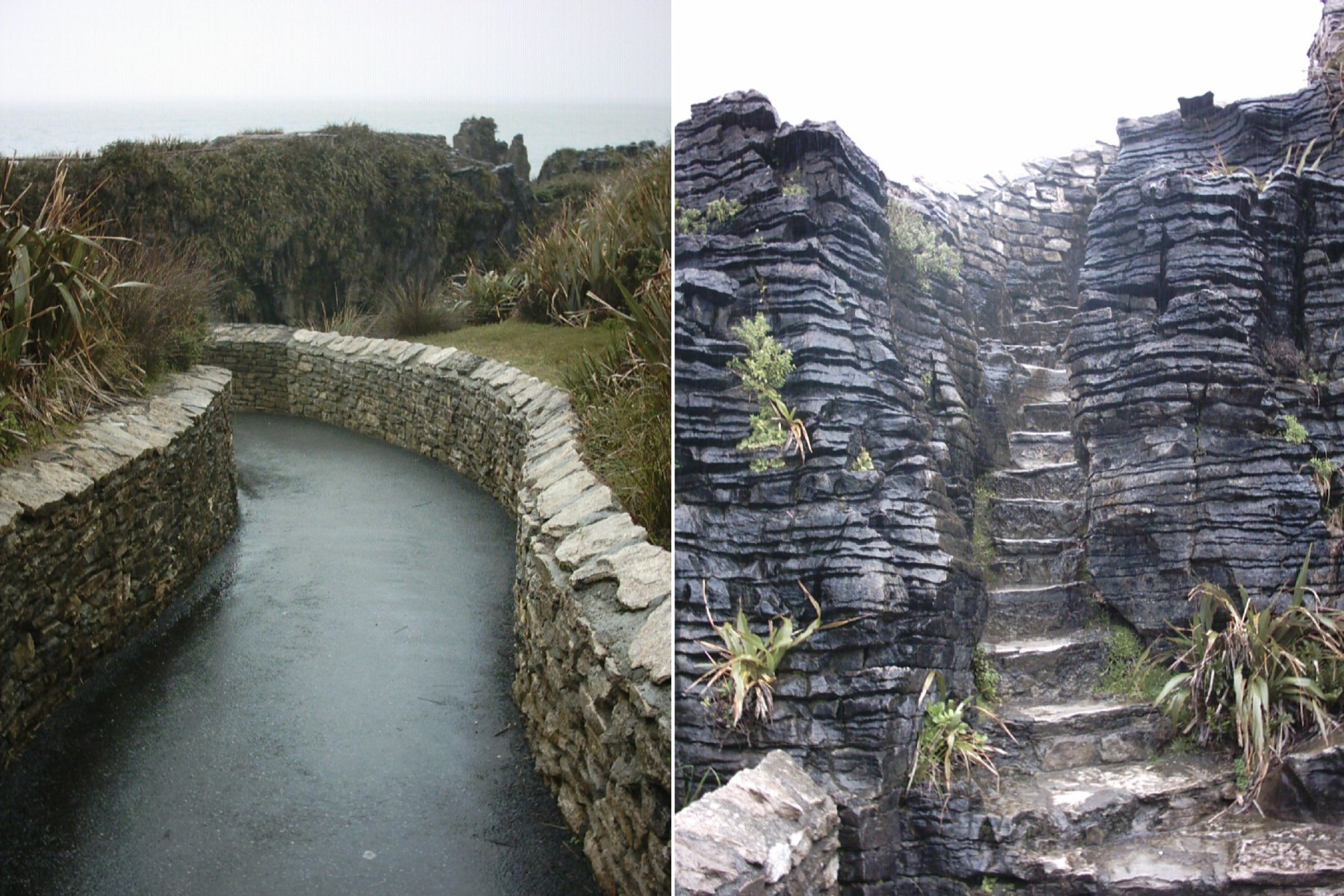
Walkways around the Pancake Rocks area

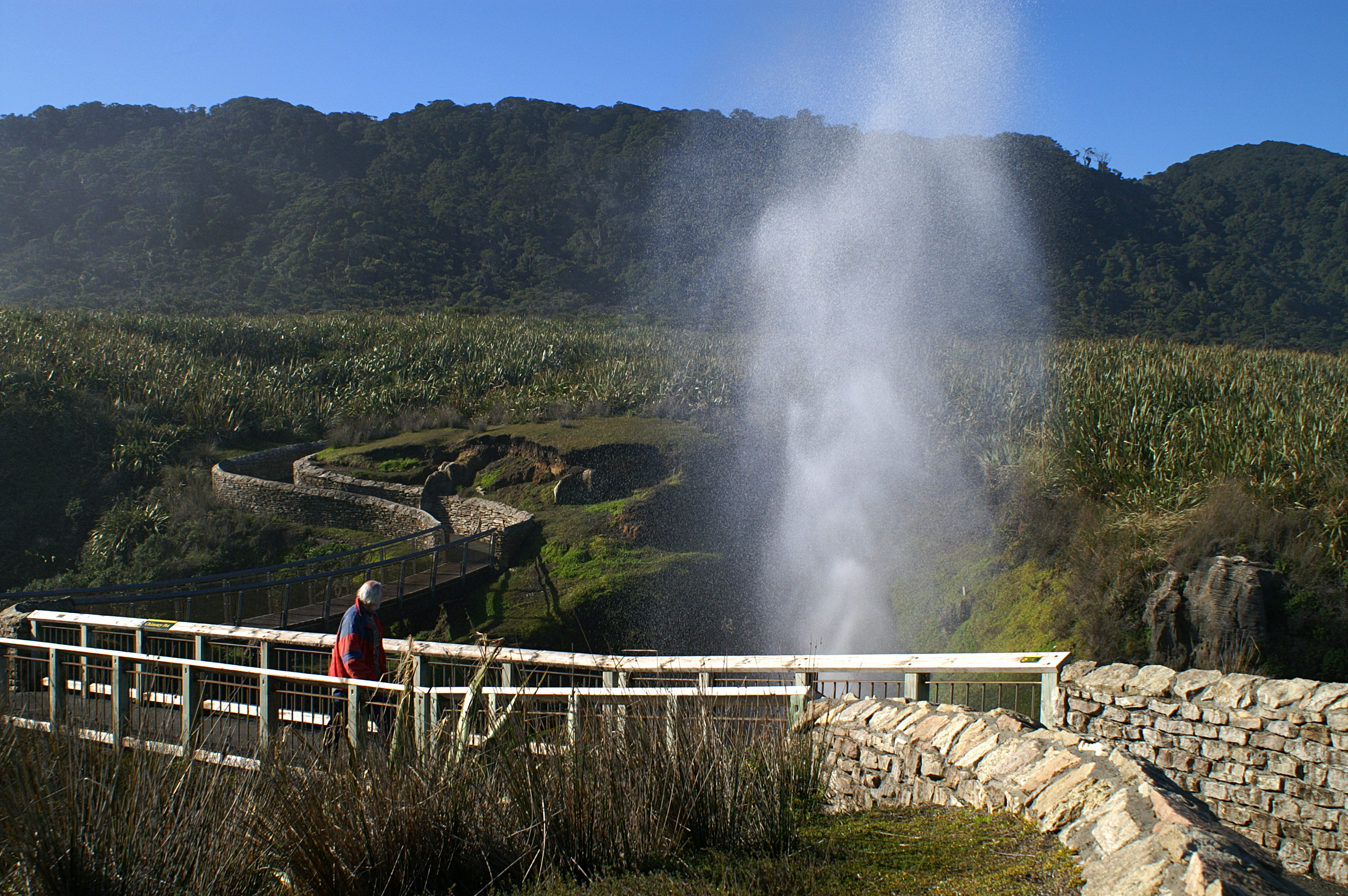
Walkway and blowhole

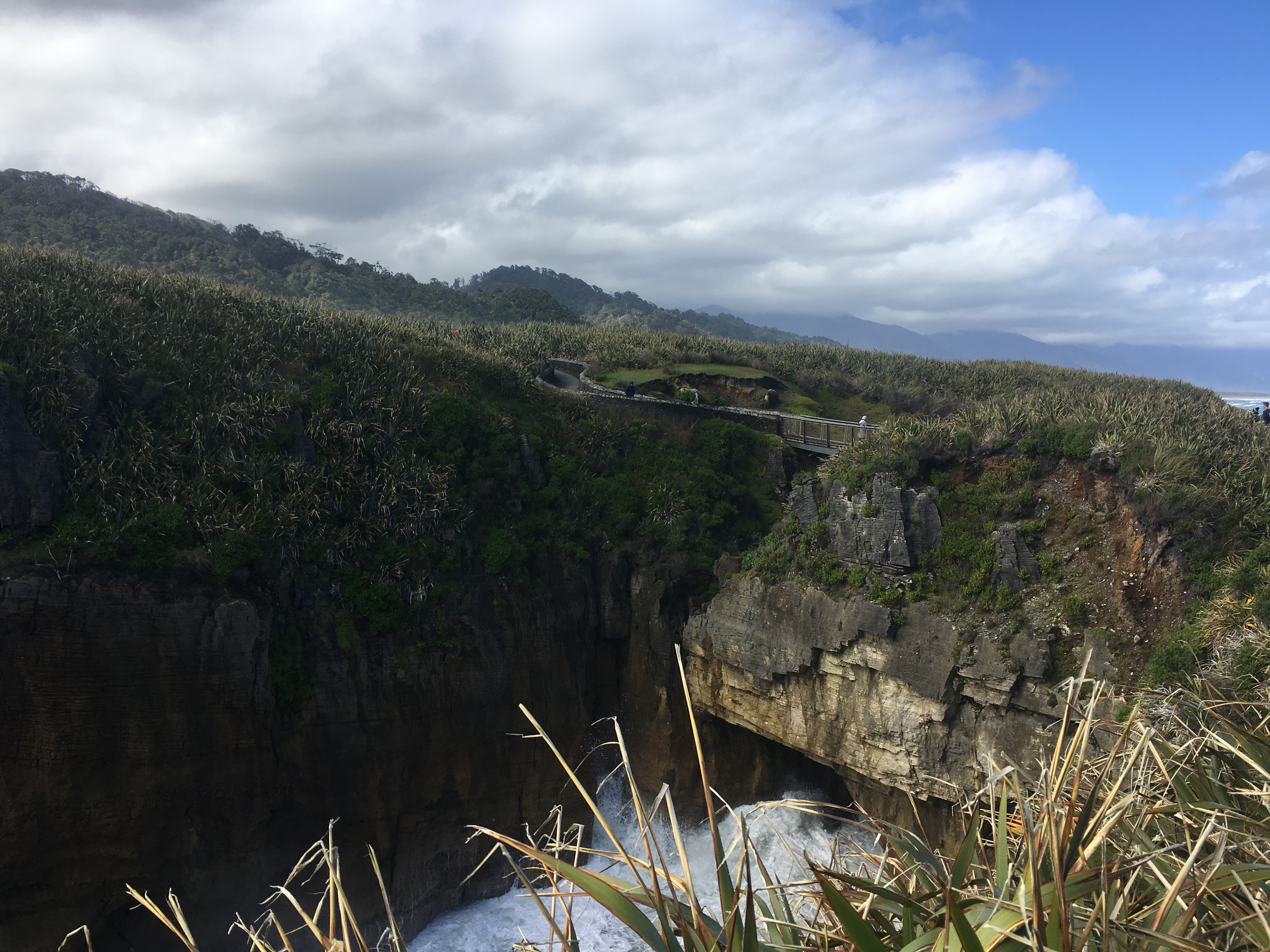
Surge pool
