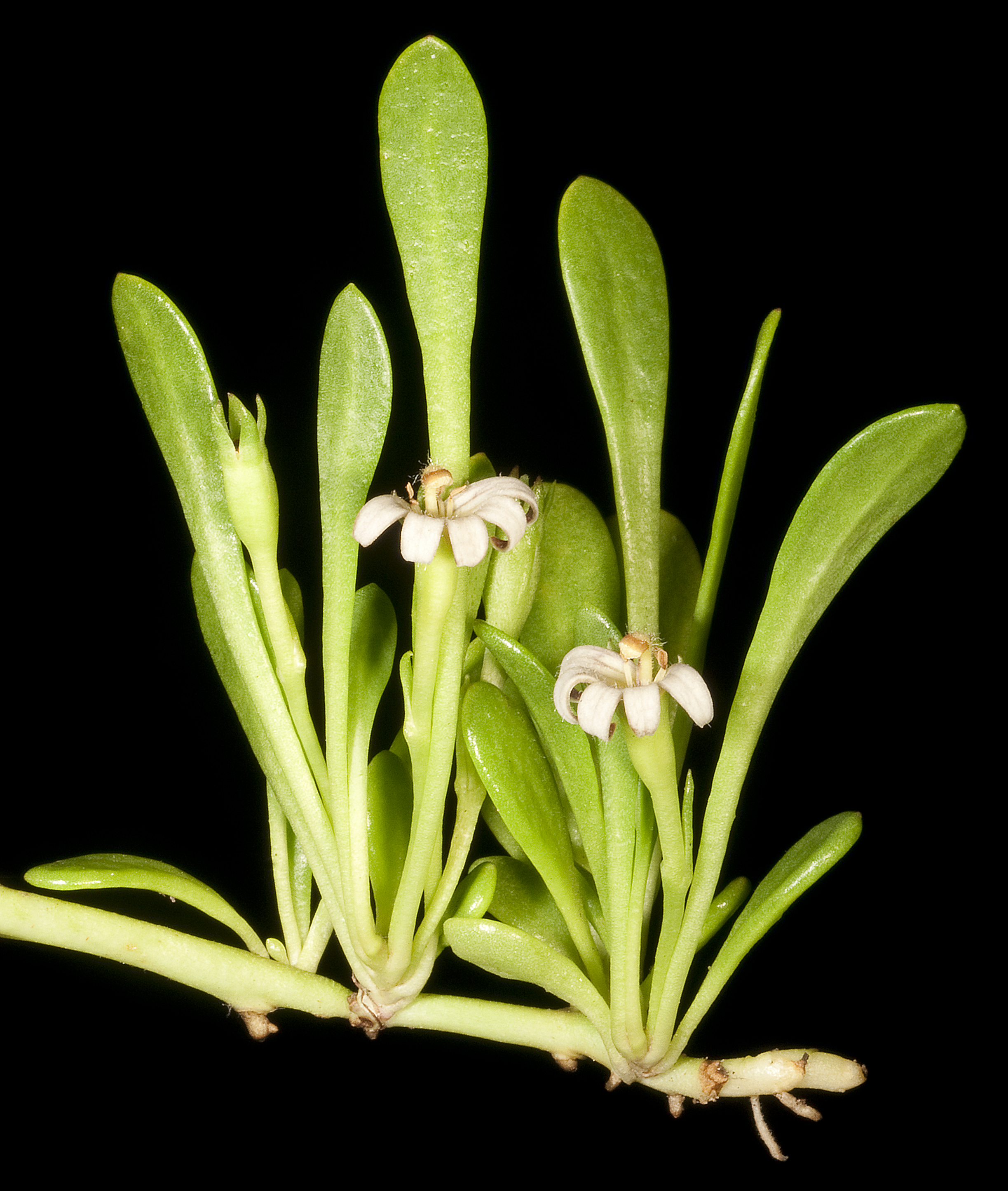

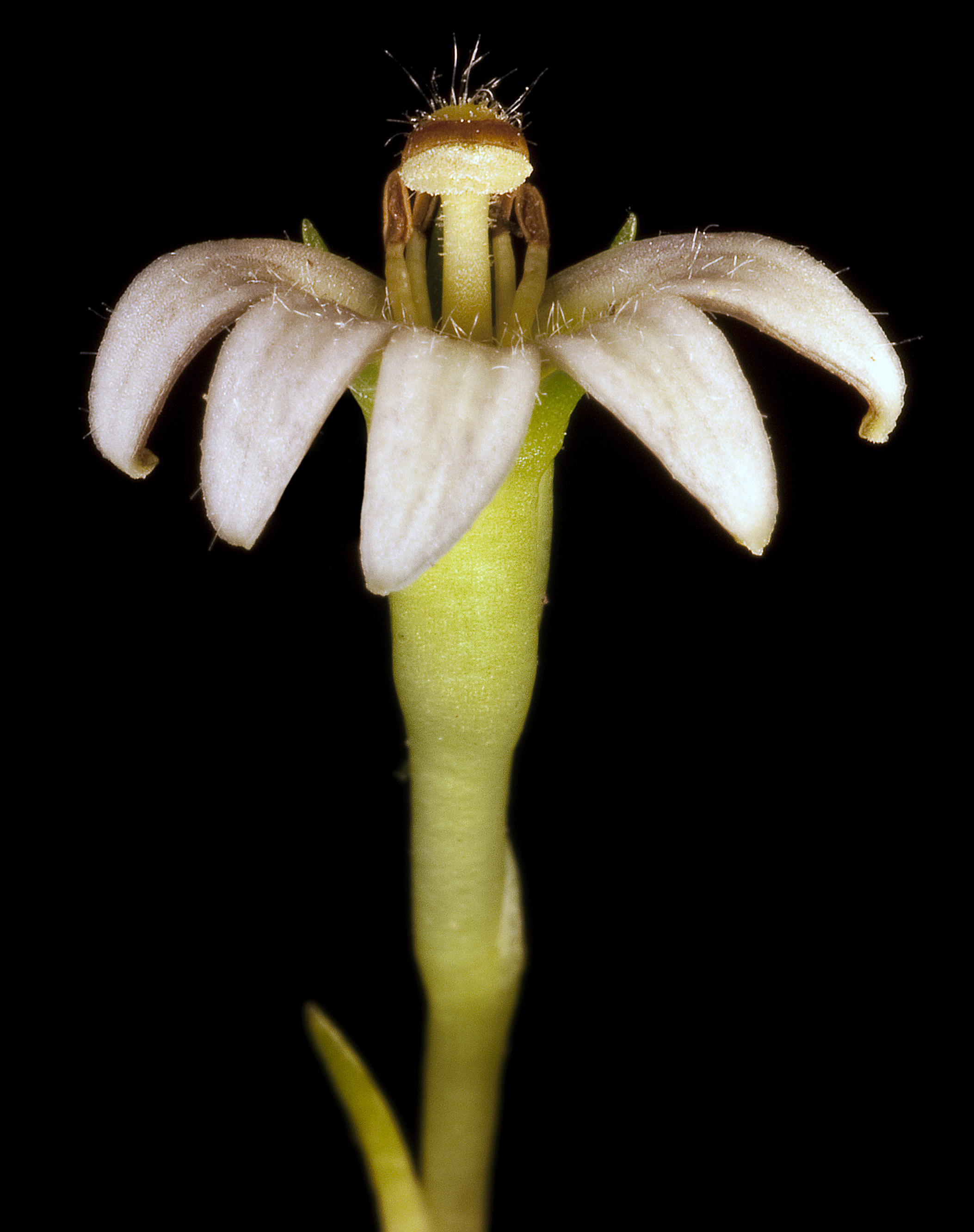

Scientific classification
- Kingdom: Plantae
- Clade: Tracheophytes
- Clade: Angiosperms
- Clade: Eudicots
- Clade: Asterids
- Order: Asterales
- Family: Goodeniaceae
- Genus: Goodenia
- Species: G. radicans

Binomial name
- Goodenia radicans (Cav.) Pers.

Synonyms
- Selliera radicans Cav.

= Goodenia radicans =

Species of plant

Goodenia radicans, commonly known as remuremu, swampweed, bonking grass, or its former botanical name Selliera radicans, is a creeping, herbaceous plant species found in New Zealand, Australia and Chile. It is the most observed Goodenia on iNaturalist in New Zealand, and is indigenous to New Zealand and Australia. Only one other Goodenia is native to New Zealand, the severely range-restricted Goodenia heenanii.

== Description ==
A low-lying herb with short green leaves, which forms matted patches. It bears small white flowers. G. radicans can grow to a height of 20 cm (7.9 in) and spread to 2 m (6 ft 7 in) wide. The shiny, narrow leaves can be up to 4 cm (1.6 in) long, and have a spoon shape. Small, fan-shaped white flowers are produced in summer. It has been hypothesised to be the main host plant for the moth species Asaphodes frivola.
