= Perpendicular Point =

Coordinates: 42°05′02″S 171°20′30″E

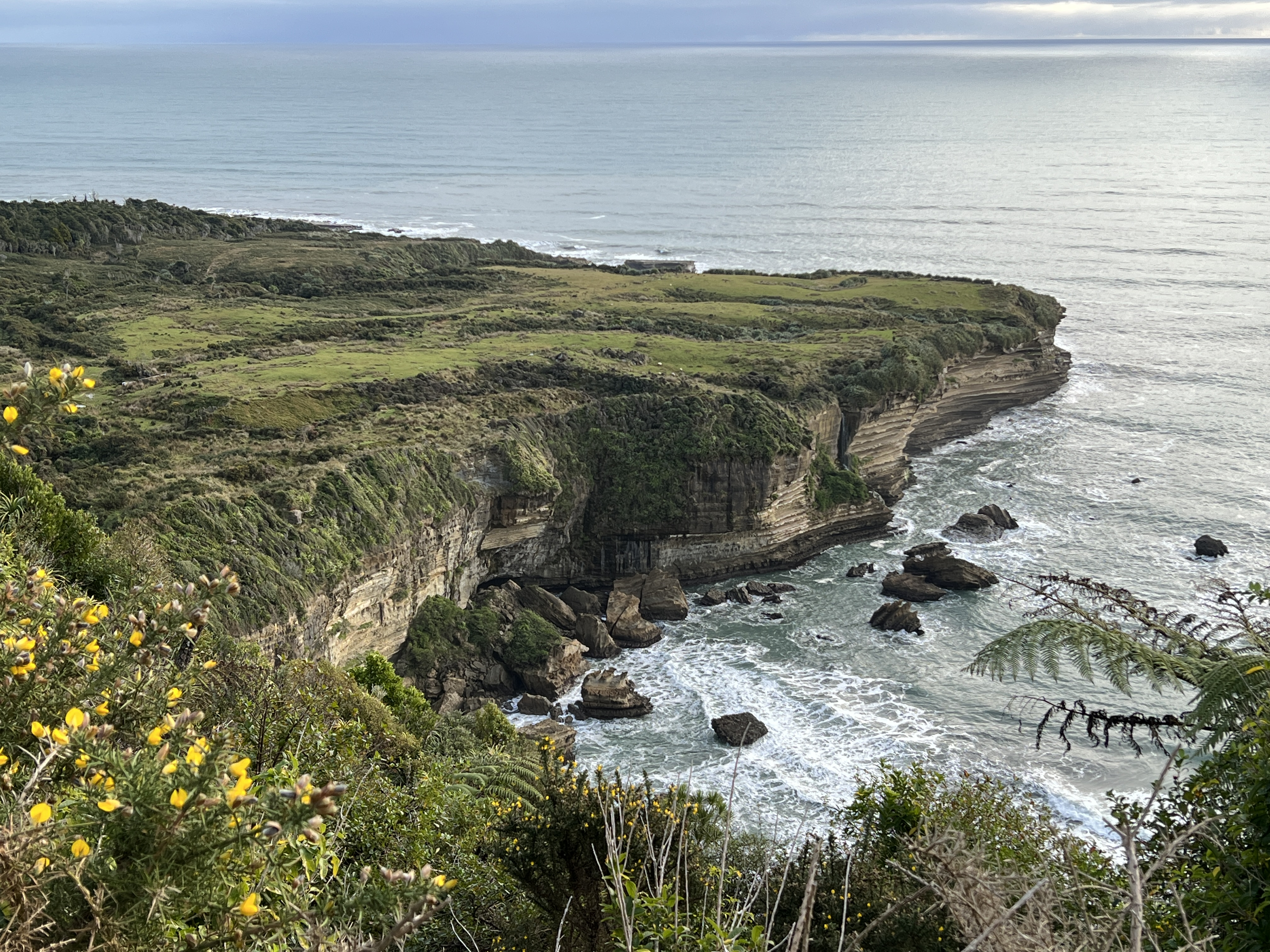
Perpendicular Point

Location of Perpendicular Point

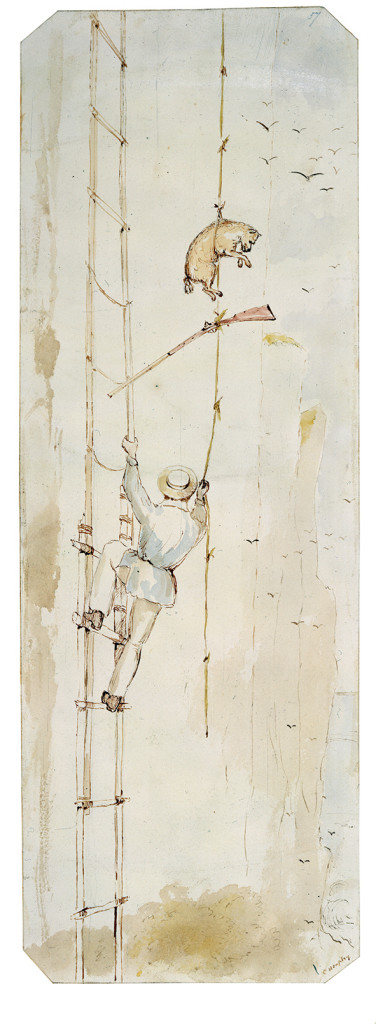
Charles Heaphy made this sketch of Thomas Brunner ascending Te Miko Cliff in 1846 with his Scotch terrier Rover being raised by a flax rope

Perpendicular Point is a small headland on the West Coast of New Zealand's South Island, overlooking the Tasman Sea. It lies about 40 km south-south-west of Cape Foulwind, close to the small community of Te Miko. Perpendicular Point was known as Te Miko to Māori. A notorious obstacle to coastal travel, the cliffs had ladders built from rātā vine and harakeke, later replaced by chains and rungs, until a reliable inland road was built in the 1860s.

== Important Bird Area ==
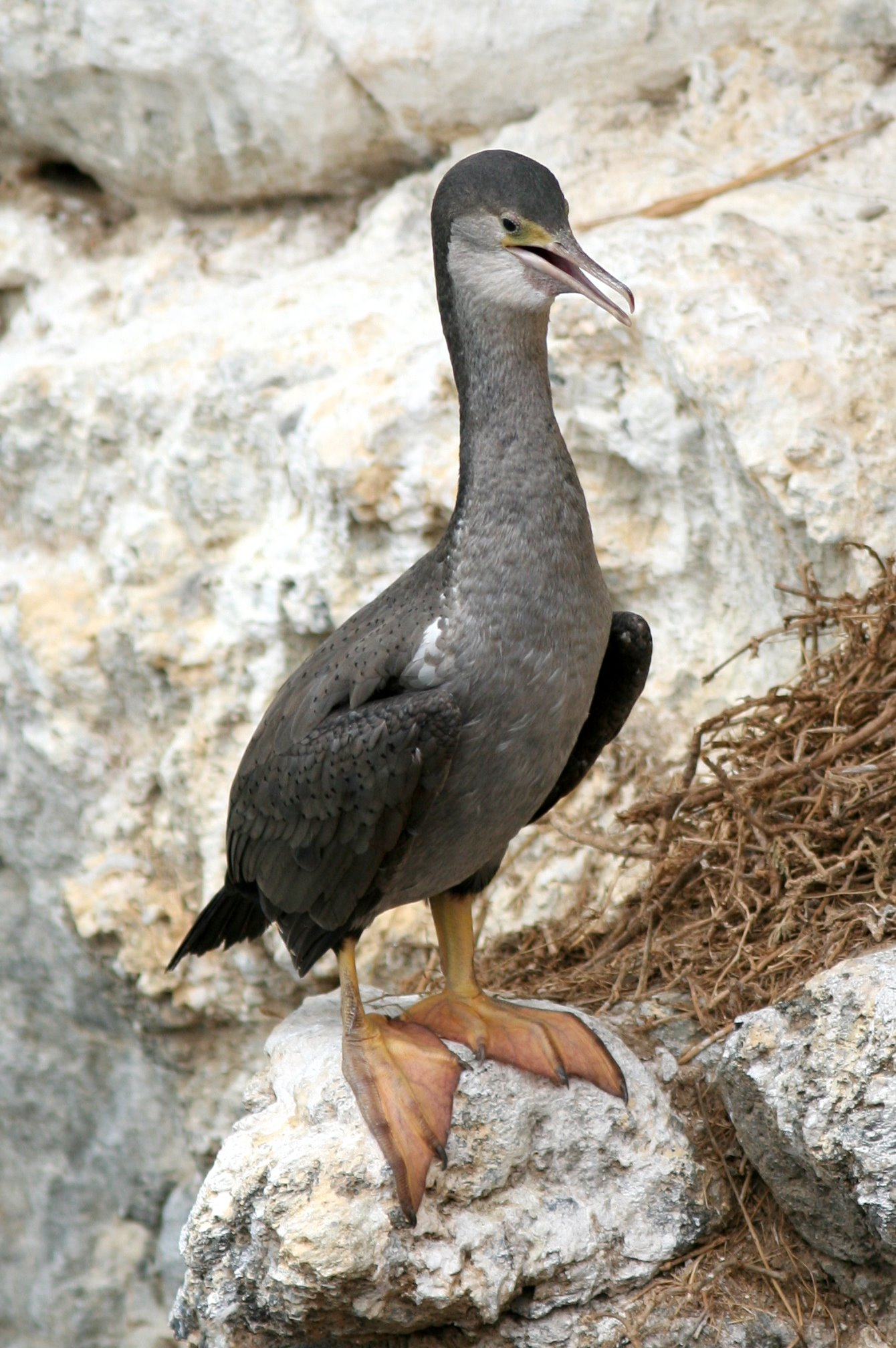
Spotted shags nest on the cliffs

The point has been identified as an Important Bird Area, by BirdLife International because the coastal cliffs in its vicinity are a breeding site for over 500 pairs of spotted shags.
