= 2019 Whakaari / White Island eruption =

Volcanic eruption in New Zealand

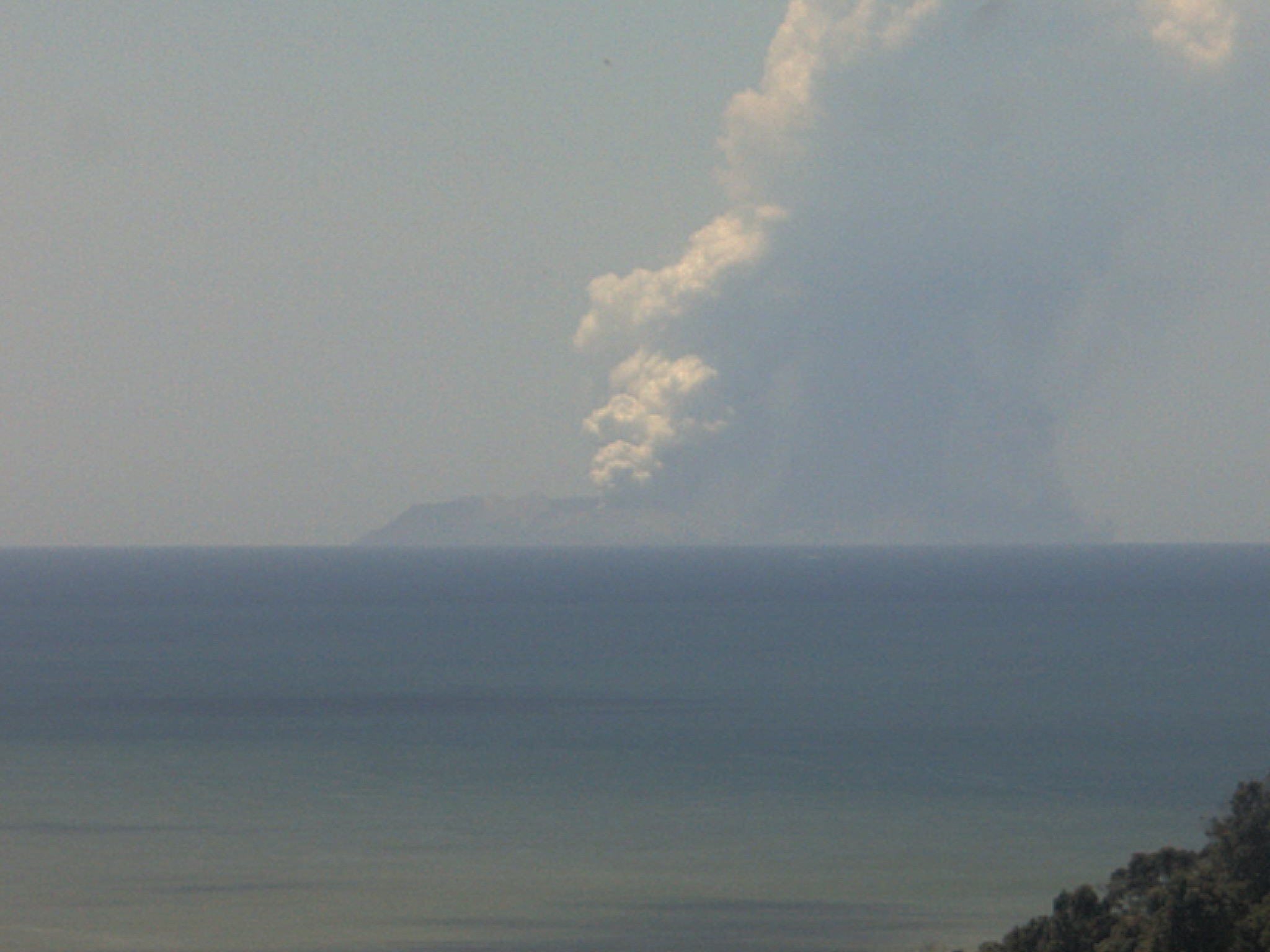
- Whakaari / White Island, nine minutes after the eruption
- Volcano: Whakaari / White Island
- Date: 9 December 2019
- Start time: 14:11 NZDT (01:11 UTC)
- Type: Phreatic eruption
- Location: Bay of Plenty, North Island, New Zealand; 37°31′12″S 177°10′57″E
- VEI: 2
- Impact: Fatalities: 22 (including 2 who are missing, declared dead); Injuries: 25

On 9 December 2019, Whakaari / White Island, an active stratovolcano island in New Zealand's northeastern Bay of Plenty region, explosively erupted. The island was a popular tourist destination, known for its volcanic activity, and 47 people were on the island at the time. Twenty-two people died, either in the explosion or from injuries sustained, including two whose bodies were never found, later declared dead. The remaining 25 people suffered injuries, with the majority needing intensive care for severe burns. Continuing seismic and volcanic activity, together with heavy rainfall, low visibility and the presence of toxic gases, hampered recovery efforts over the week following the incident.

Experts identified the event as a phreatic eruption: a release of steam and volcanic gases that caused an explosion, launching rock and ash into the air.

Following the eruption, investigations resulted in WorkSafe New Zealand charging the owners of the island and multiple tour operators as well as government and scientific agencies under the Health and Safety at Work Act 2015 for failing to ensure the health and safety of workers and others. As of July 2023, the charges against two government agencies have been dismissed or dropped and five tour operators have pleaded guilty to health and safety charges. The trial of six remaining defendants (three individual owners of the island and three tour operating companies) commenced on 11 July 2023. In early September 2023, Judge Evangelos Thomas dismissed the individual charges against the island's owners Peter, Andrew, and James Buttle but upheld the charges against their company Whakaari Management Limited (WML). On 12 September, Thomas dismissed the charges against co-defendants Tauranga Tourism Services (TTSL) and ID Tours, reducing the number of defendants to one. On 31 October, WML was convicted of one health and safety charge relating to the eruption.

On 1 March 2024, Judge Thomas imposed a total of NZ$10.21 million in reparations and NZ$2 million in fines on the six defendants Whakaari Management Limited, White Island Tours, Volcanic Air Safaris, Kahu Limited, Aerius, and GNS Science. On 28 February 2025, Justice Simon Moore overturned Whakaari Management Limited's conviction.

== Background ==
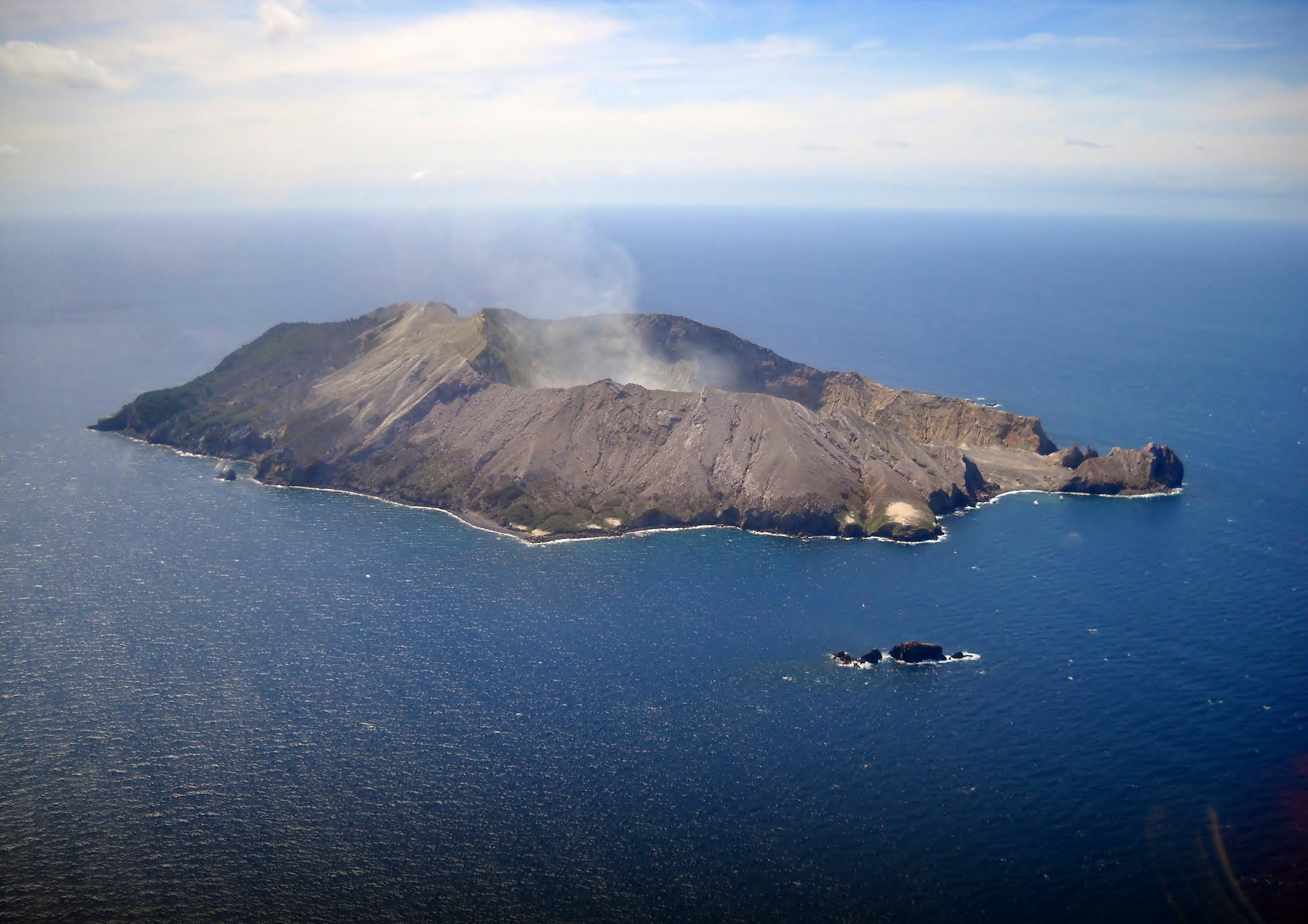
Whakaari / White Island in 2013

Whakaari / White Island (Note: The island, like many geographic features in New Zealand, has a dual Māori/English name. "Whakaari" is the Māori name; "White Island" is the English name.) is an active andesite stratovolcano, situated 48 km (30 mi; 26 nmi) off the north-northeast coast of the North Island of New Zealand in the Bay of Plenty. The volcano has erupted many times in recent history, including several times in the 1980s. A major eruption formed a new crater in 2000, and small eruptions occurred in 2012, 2013, and 2016.

The volcano had been showing signs of unrest for several weeks before the 2019 eruption. In October 2019, volcanic tremors and sulphur dioxide gas were at their highest levels since 2016, indicating that an eruption was more likely to occur, and on 18 November, the volcano was rated at Volcanic Alert Level 2, indicating "moderate to heightened volcanic unrest", due to increased activity.

On 24 November, two weeks before the eruption, a moment magnitude (M_{w}) 5.9 earthquake lasting approximately one minute with an epicentre located 10 kilometres (6.2 mi; 5.4 nmi) northeast of White Island occurred, and was felt by people throughout New Zealand as far south as Christchurch. Seismic activity can be a contributing factor to hydrothermic eruptions, due to a reduction of pressure within the geothermal system.

The island is monitored by GNS Science with three web cameras, one seismograph, and a microphone to detect volcanic explosions. The organisation also makes regular visits to test water, gas and soil, and to survey surface deformation.

Tourists regularly visited the island, primarily through White Island Tours. The organisation posted a statement on their web page before the eruption, which stated:

Whakaari/White Island is currently on Alert Level 2. This level indicates moderate to heightened volcanic unrest, there is the potential for eruption hazards to occur. White Island Tours operates through the varying alert levels but passengers should be aware that there is always a risk of eruptive activity regardless of the alert level. White Island Tours follows a comprehensive safety plan which determines our activities on the island at the various levels.

— White Island Tours

== Eruption ==
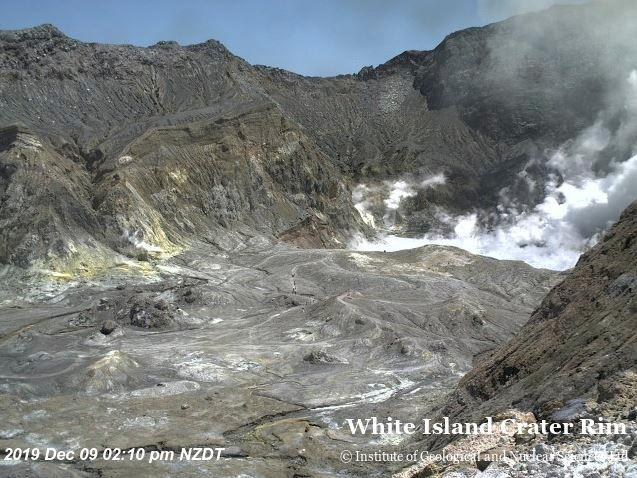
The crater rim, captured by webcam one minute before eruption. Hikers can be seen walking in the centre of the image.

External videos
- New Zealand volcano: Fatal Eruption on White Island

The volcano erupted on 9 December 2019 at 2:11 pm local time (01:11 UTC). The ash plume rose 3.7 kilometres (12,000 ft) into the air.

It was initially believed that there were about 100 tourists on or near the island when the eruption took place; later, this figure was revised to 47 people who were on the island at the time. Of these people, 38 were passengers on a shore excursion from the cruise ship Ovation of the Seas, which was on a 12-day voyage around New Zealand and had berthed at the Port of Tauranga that morning.

Some visitors were waiting for vessels to take them off the island at the time of the eruption. Tour operators and these vessels rescued 23 people from the island before it was officially declared unsafe. A passenger on one of the boats stated that his vessel attempted to first outrun the ash cloud before many on the vessel noticed a crowd of people in need of help on the jetty. Those who were brought onto the boat were aided by the original passengers who used water bottles, jackets and other clothing, inhalers, and eye drops.

Another passenger told reporters that the boat he was on, which was about 200 metres (220 yd) offshore at the time of the eruption, launched an emergency inflatable and retrieved 23 people before returning to the mainland. Paramedics from the New Zealand Coastguard boarded the boat before it reached the docks to tend the injured.

Noticing the eruption from the mainland shore, three commercial helicopter pilots conducted rescue missions to the island in their helicopters, bringing back twelve survivors. They also saw several bodies in the area, but concentrated on bringing back the survivors. The pilots reportedly attempted to return to the island to collect the bodies they had seen but were stopped by police; however, they were consulted later in order to collect the bodies once the area became more stable.

== Casualties ==
Victims by citizenship
Citizenship	Deaths	Injuries
Australia	14	10
United States	5	4
New Zealand	2	3
Germany	1	3
United Kingdom		2
China		2
Malaysia		1
Total	22	25

List of victims (fatalities)
Name	Age	Citizenship	Date of Death
Richard Aaron Elzer	32	Australia	9 December 2019
Barbara Jean Hollander	49	United States	9 December 2019
Berend Lawrence Hollander	16	United States	9 December 2019
Matthew Robert Hollander	13	United States	9 December 2019
Martin Berend Hollander	48	Australia	9 December 2019
Julie Richards	47	Australia	9 December 2019
Jessica Richards	20	Australia	9 December 2019
Krystal Eve Browitt	21	Australia	9 December 2019
Tipene Maangi	24	New Zealand	9 December 2019
Zoe Ella Hosking	15	Australia	9 December 2019
Gavin Brian Dallow	53	Australia	9 December 2019
Karla Michelle Mathews	32	Australia	9 December 2019
Jason David Griffiths	33	Australia	9 December 2019
Kristine Elizabeth Langford	45	Australia	9 December 2019
Anthony James Langford	51	Australia	9 December 2019
Winona Jane Langford	17	Australia	9 December 2019
Hayden Bryan Marshall-Inman	40	New Zealand	9 December 2019
Christopher Cozad	43	Australia	14 December 2019
Mayuri "Mary" Singh	42	United States	22 December 2019
Paul Anthony Browitt	55	Australia	12 January 2020
Pratap "Paul" Singh	49	United States	28 January 2020
Horst Westenfelder	64	Germany	2 July 2020

The 47 people on the island at the time of the eruption consisted of 24 Australians, nine Americans, five New Zealanders, four Germans, two Chinese, two Britons, and one Malaysian. A passenger aboard a rescue boat reported that many individuals among the injured suffered from severe burns, as they had only been wearing T-shirts and shorts earlier in the day.

At 18:35 on 9 December, media were told there was one confirmed fatality, with more likely to be dead as several were missing, while many were injured, seven critically. Authorities said it was still too dangerous for the emergency services to get onto the island to rescue people as it was covered in ash and volcanic material. Later the same day, officials declared that 47 people were on the island at the moment of the eruption: five were killed, 34 injured and rescued, while eight were missing and presumed dead.

Three people died in hospital over the next days, bringing the confirmed death toll to eight. Six more bodies were found during an operation on the island, bringing the death toll to 14. On 14 December, it was announced that the death toll had risen to 15 as another injured person died in hospital. A day later, an Australian citizen who had been repatriated died in hospital, bringing the death toll to 16. Another victim died from injuries in hospital and two victims whose bodies had not been recovered were declared "presumed dead", taking the death toll to 19. A further victim died at a hospital in Australia on 12 January 2020 taking the total to 20. Authorities were still working to recover two more bodies, but efforts were scaled down from 15 January.

=== Fatalities ===
Over the days following the initial eruption, the death toll steadily rose as bodies were recovered from the island and as several of the severely burnt victims succumbed to their injuries. On 15 December, it was announced that the death toll had risen to 16. Including two people who were missing and later considered fatalities, there were 13 Australian tourists, three Americans and two New Zealand men who worked as guides for White Island Tours. Another victim, an American woman, succumbed to her injuries on 22 December, raising the confirmed death toll to 19 and the number of the American fatalities to four. In January 2020, an Australian man and an American man died of their injuries and the two missing people were officially declared as dead, bringing the death toll to 21. A German man died on 2 July 2020, bringing the death toll to 22.

Due to the severe injuries sustained by those on the island, identification of the deceased was carried out by a variety of individuals including a pathologist, a forensic dentist, and a fingerprint officer. This was aided by officers creating profiles of the victims, including descriptions of appearance, clothing, photos, fingerprints, medical and dental records, and DNA samples. The information was then matched to evidence gathered from the deceased individual in the postmortem.

=== Injuries ===
All but three of the survivors suffered severe or critical injuries and the vast majority were badly burned. They were initially taken to Whakatāne Hospital, where they were triaged and stabilised before being transferred to other hospitals. Whakatāne Hospital, Tauranga Hospital, and Waikato Hospital in Hamilton all activated their mass casualty plans. On 10 December, the Ministry of Health announced that twenty-five people had been transferred to the country's four burns units in Auckland (Middlemore), Hamilton, Lower Hutt, and Christchurch, all of which were at capacity. On 11 December, it was reported that New Zealand had ordered 1.2 million cm^{2} (186,000 sq in) of skin (Note: For comparison, the average adult human body has 20,000 cm^{2} (3,100 sq in) of skin.) from the United States and Australia to treat patients following the eruption, some of whom had burns on up to 95% of their bodies. Three survivors suffered slight injuries.

Thirteen injured Australians were airlifted to Australia from the night of 11 December to receive treatment in hospitals in Sydney and Melbourne. Three Royal Australian Air Force (RAAF) planes, a C-130J Super Hercules and two C-17 Globemasters, flew to Christchurch with specialist aircrew and medical equipment on board. Several Australian state governments also supplied aircraft to assist in the airlift.

=== Missing after eruption ===
Initially, rescuers focused their efforts on people who were still alive and left the deceased on the island. Consequently, many people were listed as missing until their bodies were recovered and formally identified. On 15 December, authorities said the bodies of two victims had not been found and may have been swept into the sea. Police believe their bodies were initially near a stream, and were swept down the stream during a "significant weather event" on the night of 9 December. On 23 January 2020, the coroner declared the missing two to be dead.

== Aftermath ==
Directly after the eruption, the volcanic alert level for the island was raised to 4, but was decreased by 16:30 on the same day to level 3. No further eruptive activity occurred, and on 12 December the volcanic alert level was lowered to 2, signifying "moderate to heightened volcanic unrest." Volcanic tremor increased in the aftermath of the eruption, with small scale gas jetting and steam bursts observed on 13 December, however, the volcanic tremor level dropped that evening.

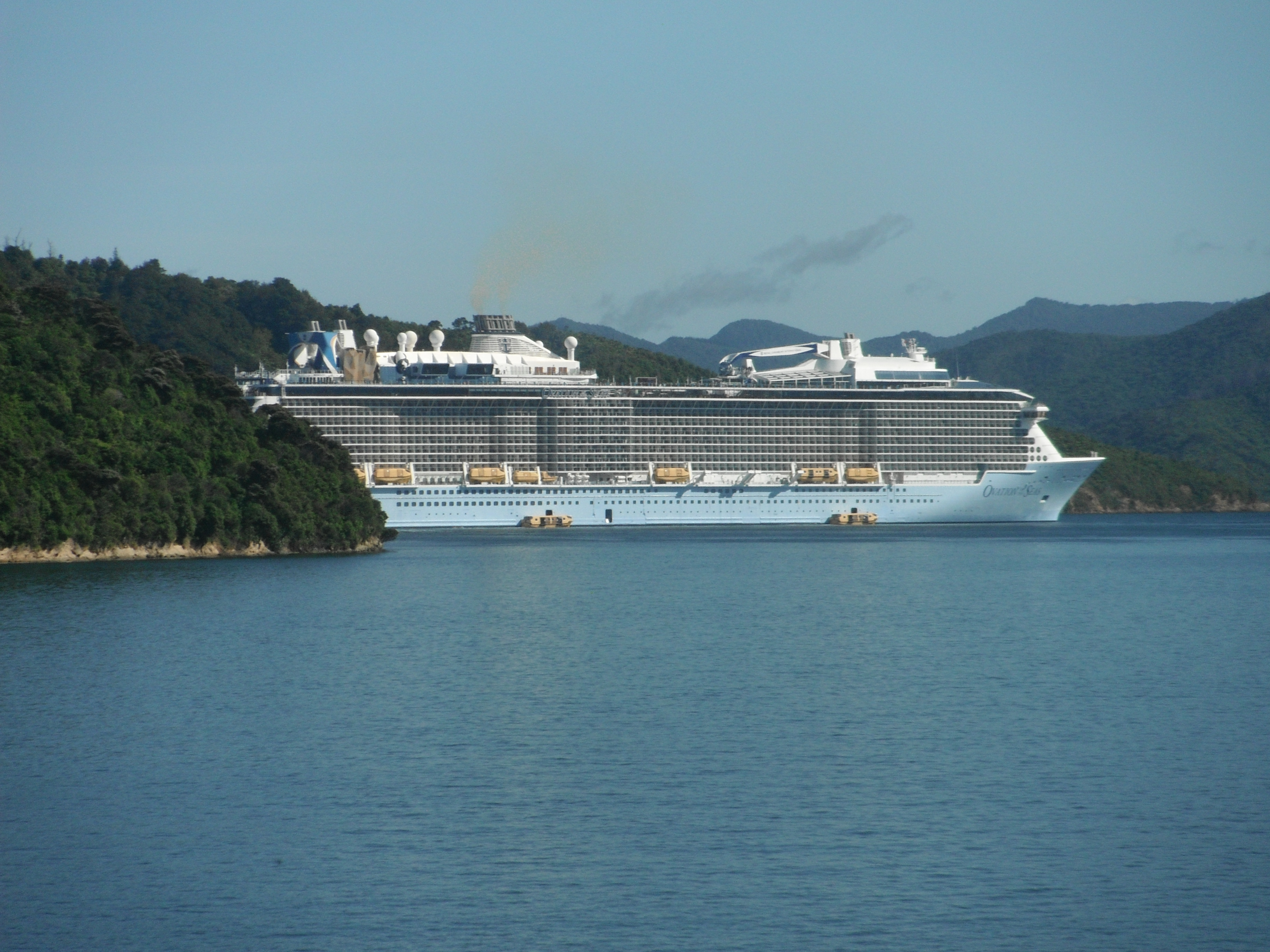
Ovation of the Seas anchored off Picton on 13 December 2019, four days after the eruption

Ovation of the Seas postponed its departure from Tauranga until the morning of 11 December as police collected DNA samples from the cabins of the missing passengers. Māori townspeople and members of the Ovation of the Seas passengers and crew held a moment of silence honouring the ship's passengers and other victims. Later a representative of the Māori began a karakia tau te mauri, a traditional blessing to settle the spirit before the ship left. The ship returned to Sydney on 16 December on an altered itinerary via Wellington and Picton. All passengers received the equivalent of one day's fare in on-board credit as compensation.

All those injured and killed in the eruption, regardless of nationality, would be covered by the Accident Compensation Corporation (ACC), who administer New Zealand's no-fault accident compensation scheme. The ACC Act generally prevents claims for damages for negligent acts in New Zealand, but it may be possible for the cruise ship passengers to sue in American courts under United States maritime law.

On 6 December 2020, Radio New Zealand reported that more than 89,000 people had signed a petition to stop the prosecution of helicopter pilots from Kahu Helicopters, Volcanic Air and Aerius who had saved lives during the eruption. In addition, the Association of Scientists has warned that the prosecution of Crown research institutions like GNS Science could have the effect of muting the scientific community and preventing the sharing of vital information during a crisis.

In December 2022, a group of about 20 people which included family members of victims, survivors and first responders returned to the island in order to place a memorial plaque to honour the 22 deceased victims. While the group was photographed without any safety equipment, they reportedly had worked with authorities and cultural advisors to travel to the island in order to place the plaque. Another ceremony was in New Zealand that month to honour the victims after being unable to in previous years due to COVID-19 restrictions.

== Legal action ==
=== Investigation and prosecutions ===
In December 2019, the New Zealand Police launched an investigation into the disaster in conjunction with WorkSafe New Zealand.

On 30 November 2020, WorkSafe New Zealand filed charges against 13 parties over tours to the island, including Buttle family members (who own the island through Whakaari Trustees Ltd, which leases it to their company Whakaari Management Ltd to manage the island), GNS Science, the National Emergency Management Agency (NEMA), and tour operators Volcanic Air and the Ngāti Awa–owned White Island Tours. Ten parties were charged under the Health and Safety at Work Act 2015; nine under Section 36 for failing to ensure the health and safety of workers and others, with one facing a charge as a person controlling a business. Each of these charges carries a maximum fine of NZ$1.5 million. Three individuals were also charged under Section 44 of the act which requires directors or individuals who have influence over a company to ensure that the company meets health and safety obligations. Each charge carries a maximum fine of NZ$300,000.

At a court hearing on 5 March 2021 the names of all the charged were officially revealed. Ten organisations and three individuals were charged under the Health and Safety at Work Act. The ten organisations were seven tourism companies (White Island Tours Limited; Volcanic Air Safaris Limited; Aerius Limited; Kahu NZ Limited; Inflite Charters Limited; I D Tours New Zealand Limited; and Tauranga Tourism Services Limited), GNS Science, the National Emergency Management Agency and Whakaari Management Ltd. The three individuals were Andrew, James and Peter Buttle, directors of Whakaari Management. A number of the charges were for alleged offences between April 2016 and December 2019. None of the charges relate to events following the eruption, when some of the charged parties rescued people from the island. On 26 August 2021, the 13 defendants pleaded not guilty to charges of health and safety breaches.

On 31 March 2022, the scenic flight operator Inflite pleaded guilty to the health and safety charges, and was ordered to pay fines of $227,500 and costs of prosecution of $40,000.

On 4 May 2022, the National Emergency Management Agency successfully appealed for a dismissal of the charges against it. NEMA's lawyer Victoria Casey QC claimed that the application of section 36(2) of the Health and Safety at Work Act 2015 would lead to "absurd outcomes". Judge Evangelos Thomas of the Auckland District Court ruled in favour of the defendant. The charge against GNS Science relating to how it communicated volcanic risk to the public was dropped in October 2022.

On 31 May 2022, the Buttle family, who own Whakaari / White Island, announced that they were applying to the court to have the charges against them dismissed. In May 2023 Judge Thomas ruled that the charges would not be dismissed.

On 14 March 2023, ID Tours failed to get the charges against it in relation to the Whakaari eruption dismissed.

On 15 June 2023, White Island Tours pleaded guilty to amended health and safety charges relating to the 2019 Whakaari eruption. On 7 July 2023, three commercial helicopter operators Volcanic Air, Kahu, and Aerius pleaded guilty to amended health and safety charges, bringing the number of defendants down to six.

=== 2023 Worksafe trial ===
==== July 2023 ====
On 11 July, the trial of the remaining six defendants—Andrew, James and Peter Buttle, their company Whakaari Management Limited (WML), and tour companies ID Tours New Zealand and Tauranga Tourism Services—commenced at the Auckland District Court. Judge Thomas presided over the judge-alone trial, which lasted 72 days. In addition to the Auckland courtroom, a virtual courtroom was established at Acacia House in Whakatane. Worksafe prosecuted the trial and summoned several witnesses and video interviews with defendants as testimony.

On the first day of the trial, a mihi whakatau (Māori welcoming ceremony) was conducted by Reverend Otene Rewhiti of Ngāti Whātua. That same day, several phone videos that had been recorded by tourists were played in court. WorkSafe prosecutor Kristy McDonald KC argued during the opening address that the defendants placed profit before safety. She also argued that WML failed to assess the risk posed by the volcano and criticised the company's lack of evacuation measures. McDonald argued that the co-defendants ID Tours and Tauranga Tourism Services failed to warn tourists of the risks of visiting Whakaari. During the first week, the court hear testimony from tourists Matthew and Lauren Urey, Annie Lu, and Volcanic Air helicopter pilot Brian DePauw, who survived the Whakaari eruption.

During the second week, the court heard testimony from tourist Jesse Langford, who sustained severe burns and lost his entire family during the eruption. On 19 July, GNS Science principal scientist Gillian Jolly testified that the active Whakaari volcano's alert level had been raised to Level Two in the days leading to the disaster due to signs of higher activity. She also testified that it was difficult to predict when the eruption would occur. On 21 July, Jolly admitted during cross-examination by the Buttle family and Whakaari Management Limited's lawyer James Cairney that GNS Science had not considered the increased volcanic unrest "a clear hazard." The court heard evidence that tourists visiting Whakaari had worn activewear despite GNS Science's policy that scientists visiting the island wear overalls and gaiters.

During the third week, volcanologist Emeritus Professor Robert Stephen John Sparks of the University of Bristol testified on 24 July that tour groups on Whakaari were a "societal risk" due to Whakaari volcano's active status. He estimated that the volcano had a 30 per cent probability of eruption, which translated to one every three years. Sparks testified that there was a five percent chance that tour groups visiting Whakaari would be affected by an eruption, which he described as "a very high societal risk." On 27 July, White Island Tours general manager Patrick O'Sullivan testified that his tour company received a 12% commission from helicopter companies for every ticket sold, which amounted to a total of NZ$50,000 in the year leading up the 2019 eruption. He testified that his company had provided a safety declaration document to cruise companies via co-defendant Tauranga Tourism Services, which contradicted survivors' testimony that they had received no warnings on the day of the eruption. The Buttles' lawyer James Cairney testified that the brothers and tour companies regularly updated authorities including GNS Science about volcanic activity on the island.

==== August 2023 ====
During the fifth week, expert witness Chris Peace, a Victoria University of Wellington lecturer in occupational health and safety, testified on 31 July that it was unsafe to conduct tours on Whakaari due to its active volcanic status. On 2 August, Peace criticised the tour operators' decision to use a shipping container as a shelter on the island. Cairney also testified that the Buttle brothers did not conduct tours on Whakaari but had a licensing agreement with the tour operators. He claimed that this licence agreement did not "provide a power for WML to stop tours at any given time".

On 10 August, the Buttle brothers' sought a stay in the court proceedings, claiming that they were enduring a "manifestly unfair trial." The brothers also sought to get the charges levelled against them following the Whakaari eruption stayed or dismissed. On 23 August, the Buttle brothers' failed to get the charges against them in relation to the Whakaari eruption dismissed or levelled, allowing court proceedings to resume.

On 23 August Worksafe's 2020 interview with the Buttle brothers was played in the Auckland High Court. In the interview, James, Peter and Andrew said that GNS, Emergency Management Bay of Plenty and the tour operators regularly communicated but that the brothers did not get involved in the day-to-day management of the Whakaari. On 24 August, the Court was played a further interview where the brothers testified that they had installed a health and safety container on the island at the request of GNS Science. Apart from the container, other infrastructure on the island included a helipad and jetty.

On 25 August, the Court was played an audio recording where the brothers found it difficult to answer WorkSafe's question on whether they owed a duty to the victims of the 2019 eruption. Peter admitted the brothers were not volcano experts and lacked the means to monitor the island on a daily basis, forcing them to rely on other parties such as GNS. Peter defended the brothers' efforts to ensure that the tour operators operated safely. WorkSafe brought their final witness investigation manager Casey Broad, who led the Whakaari eruption investigation. Broad was questioned about Emergency Management Bay of Plenty's emergency response plan for Whakaari, which was developed in consultation with the Buttles, GNS, police, and Bay of Plenty Tourism between 2018 and 2019. When Cairney asked whether WorkSafe had some responsibility for risk management regarding the emergency response plan, Broad said this was not the case but acknowledged he had considered investigating the agency's role in overseeing Whakaari's adventure tourism activities. Broad confirmed that WorkSafe had authorised a third-party to audit Whakaari adventure tourism operators, and that operators would be added to the agency's register of "persons conducting a business or undertaking" (PCBU) once they had passed the audit. That same day, WorkSafe investigators admitted that they had initially decided not to charge the Buttle brothers over the 2019 eruption due to concerns about insufficient evidence.

On 28 August, Cairney challenged Broad's claim that the Buttle brothers had failed "to take appropriate steps to improve health and safety standards" on Whakaari Island. During cross-examination, Cairney presented a 2013 email from Andrew Buttle to the Ministry of Business, Innovation and Employment (MBIE) advisor Stu Allan seeking his advice on health and safety issues that needed to be covered. Cairney argued that the defendants had tried to engage with MBIE on workplace health and safety matters.

On 31 August, Cairney made a submission on behalf of the Buttle brothers seeking to have the charges against them dismissed. He claimed there were two faults in WorkSafe's case against the plaintiffs; the first that WorkSafe had treated the directors as one group rather as individuals during the trial and the second that WorkSafe had sought to treat breaches by WML and its directors as "if it was a one-director company." WorkSafe's lawyer Michael Hodge opposed the defendants' submission to dismiss their charges, defending its case against the Buttles.

==== September 2023 ====
On 5 September, Judge Thomas dismissed the individual charges against Peter, Andrew, and James Buttle; ruling in favour of the brothers' third submission to get their charges dismissed. However, their company Whakaari Management Limited still faces trial over the 2019 Whakaari eruption. On 6 September, the co-defendants ID Tours and Tauranga Tourism Services Limited (TTSL) applied for charges against them to be dismissed. ID Tours' lawyer David Neutze claimed that WorkSafe's case against the defendants was "confusing and conflicting." TTSL's lawyer Sarah Wroe disputed WorkSafe's case that the defendants did not work with each other and White Island Tours to provide tourists with updated health and safety information about the Whakaari volcano.

On 12 September, Judge Thomas dismissed the charges against ID Tours and Tauranga Tourism Services. He accepted the defendants' arguments that the two companies did not owe a duty to the tourist on Whakaari under the Health and Safety at Work Act since they did not influence or direct the tour operators' workers, and that the companies were "elements" of the supply chain "facilitating a specific and risky product with clearly identifiable consumers." WorkSafe's lawyer Steve Symon disagreed with Thomas' decision, arguing that the companies had a duty of care to their customers since they were involved in facilitating tours to Whakaari.

On 21 September, Judge Thomas heard closing arguments from both WorkSafe and Whakaari Management Limited's lawyers. The prosecutor Kristy McDonald KC argued that the Buttle brothers failed to invest the profits from the fees and commissions that WML earned into managing health and safety risks on Whakaari island. She argued that WML had legal obligations to ensure the safety and well-being of tourists whose fees supported the company's business operations. Defence lawyer Cairney contended that the brothers had set up WML solely to manage the financial side of granting licences and that the company was not responsible for running tourist operations on Whakaari, which was the responsibility of parties like White Island Tours. He argued that WML did not have the ability to stop tours. Judge Thomas was to release his decision on the case against WML on 31 October 2023.

==== October 2023 ====
On 31 October, Judge Thomas convicted Whakaari Management Limited of one charge of breaching its duty under section 37 of the Health and Safety at Work Act 2015. He ruled that WorkSafe had proved that the company was not a "passive landowner" but had a "relevant duty.. to ensure that the health of safety of persons it permitted to be on Whakaari was not put at risk." He found that WML had not done proper risk assessments on Whakaari and had failed to engage with experts at GNS Science. Thomas ruled that WML had failed to have built facilities that would have mitigated the volcanic risk, provided workers and tourists with personal protective equipment, and ensured a means of evacuation. He dismissed the second charge that WML was responsible for ensuring the health and safety of workers and tourists. WML and the five other parties are expected to be sentenced in February 2024, with the sentencing expected to take two weeks.

==== Sentencing ====
Sentencing for the six defendants began at the Environment Court in Auckland on 26 February 2024. The court heard victim impact statements from the families of White Island Tours guide Tipene Maangi and Hayden Marshall-Inman, as well as a prerecorded video statement from American tourist Lauren Barham-Urey. WorkSafe prosecutor Kristy McDonald KC said that one of the key purposes of sentencing was to offer means of reparations to the victims but acknowledged that the judge's ability to impose an appropriate sentence was limited by the defendants' claims of financial incapacity. WML, White Island Tours, Volcanic Air, Kahu and Aerius have asked the Court not to impose fines.

On 27 February, the Court heard victim impact statements from the relatives of Australian tourist Richard Elzer, tourists Julie and Jess Richards and Avey Woods, the mother of Marshall-Inman. On 28 February, lawyers for WML and White Island Tours sought fine deductions amounting to 10 per cent and 55 per cent respectively. WML cited its lack of previous convictions and cooperation with the authorities while White Island Tours cited its guilty plea, offer to make amends, cooperation, remorse, and lack of previous convictions. McDonald opposed these fine deductions, arguing that the lack of previous incidents on Whakaari Island was due to "good luck" rather than WML's management. She also described White Island Tours's proposed fine deduction as excessive, and urged the Court to impose full fines and reparations. That same day, lawyers representing the defendants argued that WorkSafe and other government agencies had misled them about safety risks at Whakaari prior to the 2019 eruption. McDonald disputed their assertions, stating that WorkSafe had accepted its responsibility for its own involvement, and that those factors reduced culpability for the defendants.

On 1 March 2024, the six parties were sentenced by Judge Thomas. WML was fined NZ$1.045 million and ordered to pay NZ$4.88 million in reparations to the victims. The helicopter company Kahu was fined NZ$196,000, with a 25% discount from rescuing the victims while putting the lives of the pilots at risk. Aerius, another helicopter company, was fined NZ$290,000, and Volcanic Air Safaris was fined NZ$506,000 and ordered to pay NZ$330,000 in reparations to its pilot and four tourists. White Island Tours was ordered to pay $5 million in reparations, which they had through their insurance policy, and was fined NZ$517,000. GNS Science was fined NZ$54,000 for failing to communicate volcanic danger to pilots during fieldwork. This amount totalled NZ$10.21 million in reparations and NZ$2 million in fines. Thomas said that the surviving victims and their families would receive NZ$250,000 though the amount would be adjusted in cases where children lost both parents or where families lost more than one relative.

==== Appeal ====
On 25 March 2024, the Buttle family's lawyer James Cairney appealed the criminal conviction against Whakaari Management Limited. Cairney said the parties felt they had been "wrongly charged" and had a right to test their case as landlords.

On 28 February 2025, High Court Judge Simon Moore overturned Whakaari Management Limited's conviction on the grounds that the Buttle brothers did not manage or control Whakaari island. Moore accepted the brothers' arguments that the tour operations and GNS were responsible for managing activities on the island. The brothers welcomed the verdict and expressed sympathy for the victims. Some victims expressed disappointment with the verdict and accused the Buttle brothers of evading responsibility.

=== Civil lawsuits ===
In April 2020, legal action was commenced in Australia on behalf of relatives and Ovation passengers against the cruise-ship operator Royal Caribbean International.

Several injured tourists filed lawsuits against the cruise liner Royal Caribbean and the New Zealand–based tour company ID Tours in the United States and Australia. American couple Lauren Barham and Matthew Urey filed a lawsuit against Royal Caribbean, ID Tours, and White Island Tours for negligence at the United States District Court of the Southern District of Florida, claiming that the defendants had ample warning that the volcano was on the brink of eruption but had failed to warn passengers who had signed up for the crater excursion.

== Responses ==
=== Academia ===
Ray Cas, a professor emeritus from Monash University, and past president of the International Association for Volcanology and Chemistry of the Earth's Interior, published comments about the disaster through the Australian Science Media Centre, claiming that the incident was "a disaster waiting to happen". He felt that the island was too dangerous to allow the daily tour groups that visited.

=== Political ===
Prime Minister Jacinda Ardern said that "the scale of this tragedy is devastating". On 10 December, Ardern met emergency services personnel who responded to the incident. The local member of Parliament Anne Tolley stated that the town of Whakatāne was shattered by the disaster and their thoughts were with the victims and their families but did not rule out that the tours would continue due to the disaster occurring. Tolley claimed the tours were "iconic" and a "centrepiece of the town's tourism".

Australian Prime Minister Scott Morrison stated that "This is a very, very hard day for many families whose loved ones have been caught up in this terrible, terrible tragedy" and announced that an Australian Federal Police forensic team was sent to New Zealand to assist. The Australian Parliament House also lowered its flags at half-mast.

=== Coroner's inquest ===
In December 2019, coronial inquiries were launched into 19 of the 22 people who died during the Whakaari/White Island eruption on 9 December. However, these were postponed due to WorkSafe's criminal prosecution against several parties under the Health and Safety at Work Act 2015. Following the resumption of this criminal prosecution in March 2024, Coroner Marcus Elliott resumed coronial inquiries into the deaths caused by the 2019 eruption and launched two inquiries in relation to people who had died overseas. The first phase commenced at the Whakatāne District Court on 3 October before relocating to Auckland on 6 October. It lasted between six and eight weeks, and covered several issues including the events of 9 December 2019, the emergency response, issues relating to those survivors who were left on the island, their medical treatment, the timing, causes and locations of the deaths. The first phase of the inquest heard testimony from survivors, a helicopter pilot and a police officer.

The second phase is scheduled to take place in Auckland in 2026. It is expected to cover matters preceding the eruption of 9 December including regulatory oversight of tours to Whakaari, risk mitigation, possible action following risk increases, communication of risk and recommendations.

== Media coverage and legacy ==
The eruption and the experiences of those on the island have been depicted in various media formats, with the majority being filmed interviews and documentaries about tourists' personal experiences. The eruption was also heavily documented by day trippers and other individuals on boats surrounding the island, along with at least one member of the tour groups who took a photo of the start of the eruption with her phone. One survivor, Stephanie Coral Browitt, began using the social media platform TikTok to document her experiences on the island along with her immediate and continued recovery, as well as pay tribute to her father and sister, who died in the eruption. She wore compression garments and took them off in 2022.

The scientific response to the eruption and the recovery mission was highlighted in a documentary. A documentary titled The Eruption; Stories of Survival was released in December 2020 and documents the eruption through survivors' accounts and interviews with family members of those who died in the eruption. In December 2022, Netflix released The Volcano: Rescue from Whakaari and used first person accounts along with footage of the eruption and its aftermath, to document the time leading up to, during and after the eruption.

Survivor accounts were also highlighted in an episode of 60 Minutes Australia, in which some survivors made accusations of inaction towards rescue efforts which potentially caused needless deaths. Similar remarks were made in a Four Corners documentary. In an interview with 60 Minutes, a medical director, Tony Smith, remarked that authorities could have reached the island much sooner, but that "the information we were receiving at that time was that it was unsafe to land on the island." However, Smith also expressed doubt that many more lives could have been saved even if they had landed on the island sooner.

== See also ==
- List of disasters in New Zealand by death toll
- List of volcanic eruptions by death toll
- List of volcanic eruptions in the 21st century
- 2014 Mount Ontake eruption – Fatal volcanic eruption in Honshu, Japan – similar phreatic eruption with fatalities
