= Pike River Mine disaster =

2010 coal mining accident in New Zealand

- Pike River Mine (New Zealand)
- Date: 19 November 2010; 15 years ago
- Time: 3:44 p.m. NZDT (UTC+13)
- Location: Pike River Mine Greymouth, New Zealand; 42°12′20″S 171°28′57″E
- Also known as: Operation Pike
- Deaths: 29
- Injuries: 2
- Inquiries: Royal Commission
- Website: Pike River Royal Commission

The Pike River Mine disaster was a coal mining accident that occurred on 19 November 2010 in the Pike River Mine, 46 km (29 mi) northeast of Greymouth, in the West Coast region of New Zealand's South Island. It began with a methane explosion at approximately 3:44 pm (NZDT, UTC+13). The accident resulted in the deaths of 29 miners.

At the time of the explosion, 31 miners and contractors were below ground. 16 miners and 13 contractors were believed to be located at least 1.5 km (1,600 yd) from the mine's entrance, while two miners managed to walk from the mine and were treated for moderate injuries. Subsequent explosions on 24, 26 and 28 November ended hopes of any further survivors and raised serious doubt that any bodies would ever be recovered.

In December 2012, Prime Minister John Key said he would apologise in person to the families of those killed for the Government's weak regulations and inadequate inspection regime. In 2017, the Government established the Pike River Recovery Agency, with re-entry expected by March 2019. It reported to the Minister Responsible for Pike River Re-entry, Andrew Little. Re-entry was expected to cost NZ$23 million over three years. In February 2021, the agency reported that it had reached a point 2.2 km up the mine access tunnel, the furthest point into the mine that the agency planned to go. The work to this point had cost approximately $50 million. In March 2021, Little stated that it was too difficult and too expensive to go any further into the mine.

The incident was New Zealand's worst mining disaster since 1914, when 43 men died at Ralph's Mine in Huntly. It was the country's worst loss of life in a single disaster since the 1979 crash of Air New Zealand Flight 901, although it was surpassed three months later by the February 2011 Christchurch earthquake. The accident led to significant changes in occupational safety legislation, with passage of the Health and Safety at Work Act 2015 and the establishment of WorkSafe New Zealand.

== Accident and response ==
=== Explosions ===
The first explosion is believed to have occurred at around 3:44 pm on 19 November 2010. Methane may have accumulated in a void formed during earlier mining activities, then been expelled into the rest of the mine by a roof fall, or it may have accumulated directly in working areas of the mine. It is not known what sparked the explosion, but a working mine contains several possible ignition sources. Two miners managed to walk from the mine later the same day, having been in the access tunnel, or just off it, some distance from the source of the explosion. Both were taken to Greymouth Hospital suffering moderate injuries.

Initial media reports were unclear as to the number of miners and contractors remaining within the mine, with various numbers between 25 and 33 being mentioned. It was eventually ascertained that there were 16 miners and 13 contractors trapped. The names of the missing workers were released on 21 November 2010.

Mine officials noted that every worker carried a self-rescue device providing 30 minutes of air, and fresh air bases were provided within the mine for them to escape to in the event of an emergency; however, the refuges were empty and there was no evidence of miners attempting to reach them. When a borehole was drilled into the area where the miners were thought to be, a level of 95% methane was found, with the remainder primarily carbon monoxide. It appeared there was little chance that any of the miners who may have survived the blast could still be alive. Although families had held out hope that some of the miners may have survived, it was believed by the rescue team that all had been killed by the initial explosion. The mine had not collapsed and air was blowing freely throughout the tunnels indicating that there were no obstructions to survivors leaving the mine or indicating their presence by tapping on pipes or calling for help.

A second explosion occurred at 2:37 pm on 24 November 2010. Police Superintendent Gary Knowles stated that he believed no one could have survived. According to the CEO of the Pike River mine, Peter Whittall, the explosion was not caused by anybody working in or around the mine. The second explosion sent smoke, soot and explosive gases up a mine shaft where a team of rescue staff had been taking samples; the noise of the rising explosion provided them enough warning to get clear, evacuating the area on foot.

A third explosion occurred at 3:39 pm on 26 November 2010; it appeared to be smaller than the first two. A fourth significant explosion ignited the coal within the mine; the subsequent fire was visible above the ventilation shaft; the steel structure above the shaft was damaged and neighbouring scrub set alight. The fire appeared to be located near the bottom of the shaft, burning either loose coal or the seam itself, and considerably complicated efforts to stabilise the mine and made recovery of "intact" bodies unlikely.

=== Gas monitoring ===
The initial explosion damaged the mine's gas drainage line, causing methane gas to begin accumulating in the mine immediately. As there may have been a potential ignition source, it was too dangerous for rescuers to enter the mine.

It was originally predicted to take several days before the mine was safe enough for rescuers to enter, as the gases inside were feared to be explosive. Initial testing at the mine ventilation shaft was hindered by heavy clouds, preventing helicopter access, and staff were going to have to walk in over rough terrain, as the shaft does not have road access.

Seismic equipment was attached to tubes at the tunnel mouth to detect movement in the mine.

With tests still not giving clearance for rescuers to enter the mine, an attempt was made to enter the mine using a bomb disposal robot provided by the New Zealand Defence Force (NZDF). The robot failed only 550 m (1,800 ft) into the mine due to water ingress. Sources noted that while the robot was capable of operating in rain, it had "effectively [been] hit by a waterfall", short-circuiting it. A second NZDF bomb disposal robot was placed on stand-by to enter. This robot had been fitted with extra batteries and other equipment to try to avoid the problems which hit the first robot. It was later deployed, and the first robot was later restarted. The robots entered the mine on 23 and 24 November 2010, while a third, from Australia, was en route to the site. The use of three robots was unprecedented in mine rescue. The use of United States mining rescue/exploration robots was also being considered though the second explosion later that day effectively ended the robot efforts.

Early on 24 November 2010, it was reported that a drill started from above the horizontal mine had reached to the mine chamber, releasing hot gas. Later in the day, it was reported analysis showed 95% methane. A camera, inserted into a safe haven in the mine, found no evidence of human activity.

=== Rescue response ===
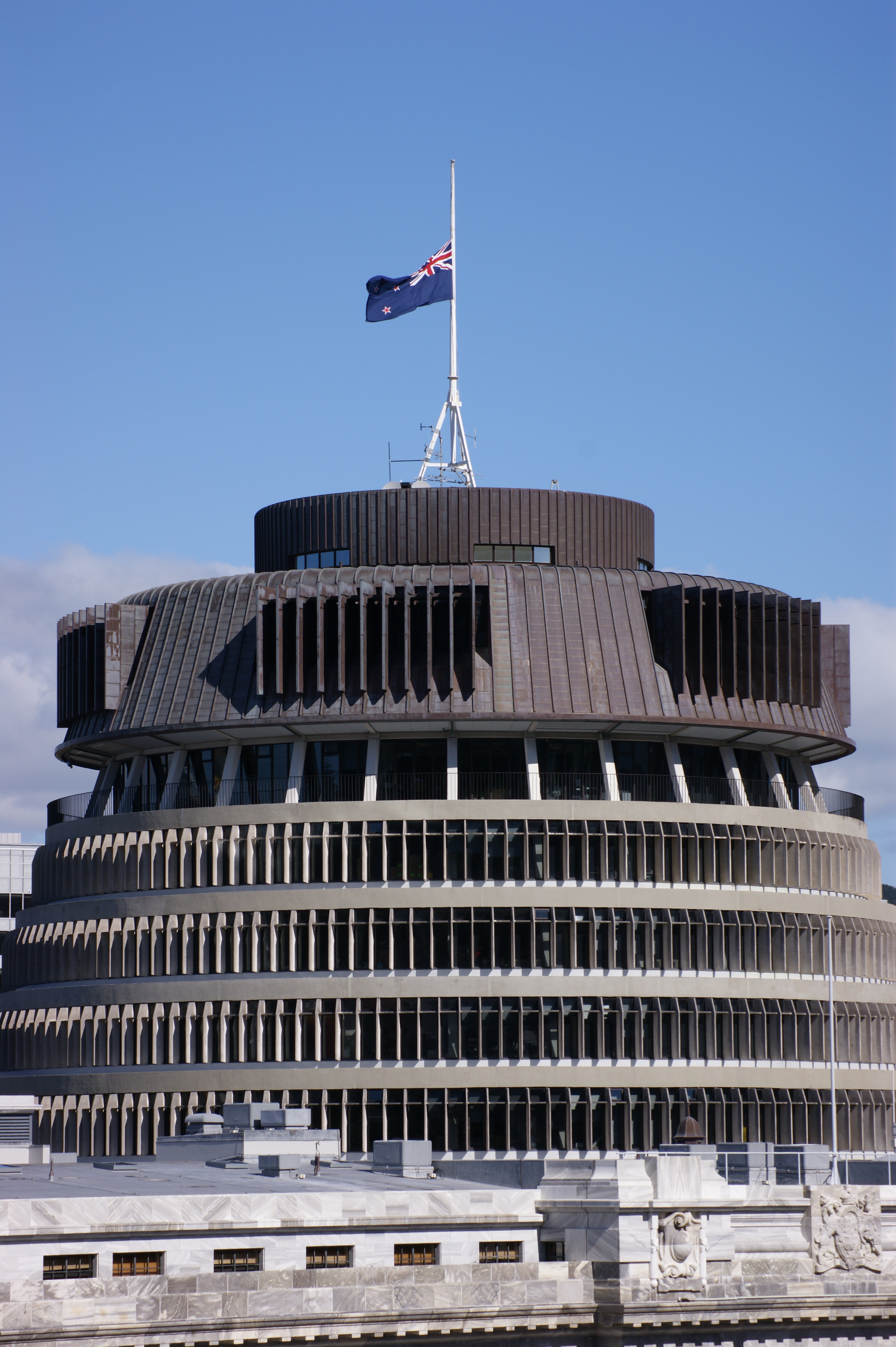
The New Zealand flag flies at half mast on the Beehive to mark the official memorial service for the 29 miners on 2 December 2010.

In accordance with the protocols established in New Zealand's Co-ordinated Incident Management System, the emergency response was led by New Zealand Police – in this case Superintendent Gary Knowles, District Commander of the Tasman region. In addition to police, "Operation Pike" involved staff and management from Pike River Coal Ltd, the company operating the mine (represented at media and family conferences by CEO Peter Whittall), mine rescue experts from New Zealand and Australia, the Red Cross, ambulance services, the New Zealand Defence Force, and the Fire Service. The recovery phase was led by Inspector Mark Harrison, with Knowles in charge overall.

A welfare centre was set up at the Red Cross Hall in Greymouth for the families of the missing men. Police encouraged families to use this centre rather than trying to reach the mine's access road, which was closed to everyone except emergency services. After several days of delays in entering the mine, some locals expressed anger at what they considered the undue cautiousness of the rescue teams, noting that in historical accidents the rescue efforts were undertaken by fellow miners. In response to the continued criticism from various media and local families for their refusal to send rescuers into the mine, Trevor Watts, leader of the Mines Rescue, explained the team's belief that any rescuers would have also been killed given the conditions within the mine. Their cautious approach was supported by many international mine rescue experts.

Both the Australian and New Zealand stock exchanges placed trading halts on Pike River Coal (PRC) shares following the first explosion to allow the company time to "provide the market with a detailed update". PRC's largest shareholder New Zealand Oil & Gas, which owned 29.4%, was also placed on a trading halt for two days; upon reinstatement the shares lost 29% of their value. PRC's shares were halted for 13 days. On 2 December 2010, when New Zealand held a nationwide moment of silence, including at the stock exchange, PRC's suspension was inadvertently allowed to end and about 200,000 share trades were later invalidated.

The first explosion was classified as a "highly, highly irregular event", and the New Zealand Prime Minister John Key immediately announced the government would hold an inquiry into its cause. It was later announced that the government would appoint a Royal Commission of Inquiry. In addition, the police and the coroner would conduct investigations – as required by law – as would the Department of Labour.

=== Recovery operation ===
A Górniczy Agregat Gaśniczy (GAG) unit from Queensland, accompanied by 16 crew from Queensland Mines Rescue Service, was brought in on 26 November 2010 by the RNZAF, to be used in an attempt to suppress the fires. It was expected to take three days to assemble, and about five days for the fire-retardant emitted from the unit to fill the mine.

On 10 December 2010, Police Commissioner Howard Broad said that the police intended to hand control of the recovery operation at the mine to the company. On 13 January 2011, Howard Broad told a media conference that the recovery of the bodies of the miners would be halted as it was impractical and too unsafe. Responsibility for securing the mine would be left with the receivers of Pike River Coal.

On 14 January 2011, the police announced that the mine had been sealed as it was too dangerous to continue efforts to retrieve the bodies of the missing miners and contractors. On 17 January 2011, the receivers advised the police that their plan was to spend the next five to eight weeks stabilising the atmosphere in the mine and the underground heat sources. The plan did not include recovery of the bodies of the deceased miners. On 17 January 2011, it was further confirmed that recovery of the bodies was unlikely. On 9 March 2011, the receivers took control of the mine from the New Zealand Police. During inspection and recovery attempts, five robotic vehicles have been sent into the mine, but all failed within the mine, for reasons such as water ingress into their electronics, or getting stuck.

In February 2013, a panel of experts, including representatives from Solid Energy, the government and families of the deceased, met to discuss whether retrieval of the bodies would be possible if they had the necessary funding. They came to the conclusion it could be done, and the government promised to fund the effort if its High Hazards Unit agreed. In October 2013, Solid Energy with the assistance of the New Zealand Defence Force started the Pike re-entry project in an effort to send mine rescue and other experts 2.3 km into the drift access tunnel and close to the debris blockage caused by a roof fall. The following year WorkSafe wrote to Solid Energy stating that the re-entry plan made at that time was "safe and technically feasible"; and this became public knowledge the following month, in September 2014. In November 2014, Solid Energy announced the decision not to re-enter the mine due to safety concerns, saying that if rescuers re-entered there was an unmanageable risk that more people would die.

== Victims ==
The 29 men ranged in age from 17 to 62. The youngest, Joseph Dunbar, was on his first shift underground after celebrating his 17th birthday the previous day. Dunbar had been due to start work at the mine on 22 November 2010 but had convinced management to allow him to start on 19 November 2010. Of the 29, 24 were New Zealanders, two were Scottish, two were Australian, and one was South African. The 24 New Zealanders were predominantly West Coasters, though they also included one Southlander.

The victims included, among others, Grey District Councillor Milton Osborne and two West Coast representative sportsmen, South Island rugby league player Blair Sims and West Coast Rugby Union player Michael Monk. One of the trapped miners, Benjamin Rockhouse, was the brother of survivor Daniel Rockhouse, one of the two men who walked clear of the mine after the initial explosion.

Deaths
| Name | Age | Residence | Nationality |
|---|---|---|---|
| Conrad John Adams | 43 | Greymouth | New Zealand |
| Malcolm Campbell | 25 | Greymouth | British |
| John Leonard Hale | 45 | Ruatapu | New Zealand |
| Glen Peter Cruse | 35 | Cobden | New Zealand |
| Allan John Dixon | 59 | Runanga | New Zealand |
| Zen Wodin Drew | 21 | Greymouth | New Zealand |
| Christopher Peter Duggan | 31 | Greymouth | New Zealand |
| Joseph Ray Dunbar | 17 | Greymouth | New Zealand |
| Daniel Thomas Herk | 36 | Runanga | New Zealand |
| David Mark Hoggart | 33 | Greymouth | New Zealand |
| Richard Bennett Holling | 41 | Blackball | New Zealand |
| Andrew David Hurren | 32 | Hokitika | New Zealand |
| Jacobus (Koos) Albertus Jonker | 47 | Cobden | South African |
| William John Joynson | 49 | Greymouth | Australian |
| Riki Steve Keane | 28 | Greymouth | New Zealand |
| Terry David Kitchin | 41 | Greymouth | New Zealand |
| Samuel Peter MacKie | 26 | Greymouth | New Zealand |
| Francis Skiddy Marden | 41 | Runanga | New Zealand |
| Michael Nolan Hanmer Monk | 23 | Greymouth | New Zealand |
| Stuart Gilbert Mudge | 31 | Runanga | New Zealand |
| Kane Barry Nieper | 33 | Greymouth | New Zealand |
| Peter O'Neill | 55 | Runanga | New Zealand |
| Milton John Osborne | 54 | Ngahere | New Zealand |
| Brendan John Palmer | 27 | Cobden | New Zealand |
| Benjamin David Rockhouse | 21 | Greymouth | New Zealand |
| Peter James Rodger | 40 | Greymouth | British |
| Blair David Sims | 28 | Greymouth | New Zealand |
| Joshua Adam Ufer | 25 | Middlemount, Queensland | Australian |
| Keith Thomas Valli | 62 | Winton | New Zealand |

== Aftermath ==
On 24 November 2010 at 9:00 p.m., a service was held at the Holy Trinity Church in Greymouth, where hundreds of people gathered to mourn the loss of the workers. People at the service included Peter Whittall (CEO of Pike River Coal) and Grey District Mayor Tony Kokshoorn who delivered a message from Pope Benedict XVI, saying that he shared the anxiety of the miners' families and that his prayers were with them. Elizabeth II, Queen of New Zealand, sent to John Key a note expressing her condolences for the families of the deceased, calling the event a "national disaster". Her grandson, Prince William, sent a similar message to Key.

A number of countries worldwide expressed their condolences, including the United Kingdom, Australia (where the Australian Parliament observed a moment's silence and flags were flown at half mast, in conjunction with New Zealand), and the United States.

The New Zealand Warriors and Newcastle Knights opened their 2011 season schedule with a charity match to raise money for the West Coast region. In a joint partnership between the two teams, the NZRL and NRL, all money raised from the match was divided between the Pike River mining relief fund and the West Coast Rugby League. The teams arrived on 3 February 2011 to carry out community appearances in the region. The Crusaders also announced that they would play their first home match of the 2011 Super Rugby season in the West Coast Rugby Union jersey. These were later auctioned off to raise money for the Pike River mining relief fund.

On 17 March 2011, after attending a national memorial service for the earthquake in Christchurch, Prince William visited Greymouth and met families affected by the disaster.

On 27 June 2011, The Australian featured an article titled "Miners doomed by fatal flaws" which alleged that Peter Whittall had not ensured the Pike River Mine had installed safety measures which are common in Australia, but are not legally required in New Zealand. The possible safety measures not used in the Pike River Mine were a "tube bundle" gas monitoring system, stocks of food and water, breathing apparatus, and a second escape route. Whittall has consistently maintained that safety standards were high. A former mine supervisor alleged that miners continued to work when the methane gas concentrations exceeded the threshold of 2%. It is also alleged that the miners routinely blew compressed air over the methane alarms to prevent them from triggering.

In November 2013, the Christchurch-based journalist Rebecca Macfie published the book Tragedy at Pike River Mine: How and Why 29 Men Died, based on research and interviews into the causes of the disaster.

Several commentators criticised successive National and Labour Party governments for deregulating safety in the mining sector and some also argued that the Engineering, Printing and Manufacturing Union (EPMU), which had several members at Pike River, did not do enough to prevent the tragedy. In the days after the explosion, EPMU leader Andrew Little (who later became Labour Party leader) said there had been no problems at Pike River Coal and defended its safety record.

The disaster has led to calls for New Zealand to introduce a crime of corporate manslaughter, and in 2013 Labour leader Andrew Little introduced a private members' into the ballot that would introduce a new crime modelled on the United Kingdom's Corporate Manslaughter and Corporate Homicide Act. Simester and Brookbanks wrote in their criminal law textbook:

[D]isasters like Pike River seem to point inexorably towards the need to better regulate the activities of corporate managers and to create a stronger safety culture around workplace environments. Corporate manslaughter ought to be considered, together with other regulatory mechanisms, as means of better protecting employees and members of the public from corporate negligence and unsafe practices.

== Royal Commission ==
In November 2010, Prime Minister John Key announced that the Government would conduct a Royal Commission of Inquiry into the disaster, to be led by Justice Graham Panckhurst. Unionist Matt McCarten criticised the composition of the commission on the grounds that it should have at least one union member, which government had refused, arguing that including union members would risk bias. On 13 December 2010, Attorney-General Chris Finlayson announced the names of the two people to join Judge Pankhurst on the Royal Commission of Inquiry: Stewart Bell, the Queensland State Government Commissioner for Mine Safety and Health; and David Henry, formerly Inland Revenue Commissioner and Chief Executive of the Electoral Commission. The Royal Commission was originally expected to report its findings by March 2012.

On 30 October 2012, the Chair of the Royal Commission, the Hon Justice Pankhurst presented the Royal Commission report to the Attorney-General Chris Finlayson in Wellington. The Royal Commission's Final Report was released to the public on 5 November 2012. Later that day, the Minister of Labour Kate Wilkinson resigned her portfolio in response to the conclusion that the regulation and inspection of mining by the Department of Labour had failed to prevent the accident.

The former directors John Dow, Ray Meyer, Stuart Nattrass and former chief executive Peter Whittall rejected accusations of running an unsafe mine and said they disagreed with the Royal Commission's conclusion that the directors had not acted properly over health and safety at the mine. Grey District Mayor Tony Kokshoorn blamed the mine managers.

On 12 December 2012, the Government released a plan to implement the recommendations of the Royal Commission.

== Prosecutions ==
In November 2010, the Police and the Department of Labour began investigating the accident for grounds for prosecution. The investigation involved a team of up to 15 staff who conducted more than 200 interviews. In November 2011, the Department of Labour formally initiated the prosecution of three parties under the Health Safety and Employment Act: Pike River Coal Limited (in receivership), VLI Drilling Pty Limited (Valley Longwall International) and Peter William Whittall for 25 charges of alleged health and safety failures associated with the accident.

=== Pike River Coal ===
The receivers for Pike River Coal Limited advised that the company would not enter a plea to the charges. In July 2013, Pike River Coal was ordered to pay $110,000 to each of the victims' families and fined $760,000. In the end it did not pay the fine and only paid $5,000 to each family, saying it did not have the money.

=== Valley Longwall International ===
On 31 July 2012, the contracting company Valley Longwall International pleaded guilty in the Greymouth District Court to three health and safety charges. On 26 October 2012, Valley Longwall International, who had lost three employees in the mine, was fined $46,800.

=== Peter Whittall ===
Peter Whittall did not appear in court for his 12 health and safety charges and his case was adjourned to October 2012. On 25 October 2012, Whittall entered not guilty pleas. In December 2013, charges were dropped against Whittall, citing a lack of evidence. Instead, Whittall and Pike River Coal offered a voluntary payment on behalf of the directors and officers of the company to the families of the men and two survivors. Some family members of the deceased miners criticised the decision to drop charges, and in August 2016, two family members sought a judicial review of the decision.

On 23 November 2017 the New Zealand Supreme Court ruled that the arrangement by WorkSafe to drop all charges against Whittall, conditional on payment of $3.41 million, was an agreement to prevent the prosecution and was therefore unlawful. Police had already decided not to press criminal charges against Whittall. Whittall's lawyer, Stuart Grieve QC, had proposed a voluntary payment instead of a plea bargain, conditional on WorkSafe agreeing not to proceed against Whittall. The court said: "If accepted, this proposal would undoubtedly have constituted a bargain to stifle prosecution.

On 23 November 2020, the New Zealand Law Society confirmed in a letter to former lawyer Christopher Harder, who lodged a formal complaint in October 2020, that the matter was being referred to a Standards Committee "for consideration of commencing an investigation of its own motion". The complaint, viewed by the New Zealand Herald, claims that Stuart Grieve QC and then Crown Prosecutor for Christchurch Brent Stanaway brought the legal profession into disrepute by entering into an "unlawful agreement to pay money for the dropping of all charges" and "stifling a prosecution by deliberately misleading and deceiving the sentencing judge [District Court Judge Jane Farish]". Harder told Stuff "I hope the fact that the Law Society is finally looking at this unlawful agreement to stifle the WorkSafe prosecutions gives the deceased miners families here some little peace of mind and a little hope that there might still be a little justice to come." Harder did not wish to be considered the complainant or a party to the complaint, but described himself to the law society as "a messenger". He felt the society should have begun this investigation without his correspondence.

== Mine re-entry ==
After an agreement was signed between New Zealand's major political parties in Wellington on 15 August 2017, soon-to-be Prime Minister Jacinda Ardern pledged that a manned re-entry of the mine would be conducted with the object of recovering bodies and investigating the cause of the explosion. Meanwhile, preparations for a robotic entry later in the year continued.

On 20 November 2017, Minister for Pike Mine Re-entry Andrew Little announced the creation of a stand-alone government department called the Pike River Recovery Agency to explore plans to re-enter the mine and recover the bodies of the deceased miners.

On 31 January 2018, the Pike River Recovery Agency formally came into existence with its headquarters being in Greymouth. On 19 April 2018, Little, as Minister for Pike Mine Re-entry, entered the mine's portal with Pike Family representatives Anna Osborne and Sonya Rockhouse to demonstrate that a safe re-entry was possible. He vowed that the coalition Government would re-enter the drift to recover evidence and the remains of the deceased miners.

On 21 May 2019, a mine recovery team led by Pike River Recovery Agency chief operating officer Dinghy Pattinson re-entered the mine for the first time since 2010, breaking the concrete seal to the mine drift. Body recovery and forensic operations are expected to take several months. The mine re-entry was marked by family members releasing 29 yellow balloons and calling out the names of those who died. Re-entry and recovery operations will consist of three phases. The first team of miners will re-enter to assess hazards and to establish infrastructure for supporting the roofs and sides of the drift. A second forensically-focused mining team will then enter the mine to examine and remove any evidential material. A third team will provide mining services including gas monitoring, communications lines and ventilation bags. Once completed, the site is expected to be refurbished and handed back to the Department of Conservation.

On 10 June 2020, Minister for Pike Mine Re-entry Andrew Little announced that it was "impractical" to expect the remains of the fallen miners to be recovered. Instead, recovery efforts would focus on gathering evidence for the homicide case. The cost of the recovery project had risen from NZ$23 million to NZ$35 million, with concerns that the figure could reach NZ$50 million.

On 17 February 2021, the Pike River Recovery Agency abandoned plans to recover the bodies of fallen miners after reaching the roof fall 2.26 kilometres up the mine's access tunnel. The Agency would instead focus on conducting forensic work in the Pit Bottom in Stone area in support of the New Zealand Police investigation. On 23 March 2021, the Minister responsible for Pike River Re-entry, Andrew Little, stated that it was too hard and too expensive to go any further into the mine.

On 12 May 2021, the Government confirmed that it was reviewing an NZ$8 million plan submitted by a group representing 23 Pike River families to recover the mine's ventilation fan, which is considered to be the most likely source of the 2010 explosion.

On 4 June 2021, 22 of the 29 victims' families filed for a judicial review challenging Minister for Pike Mine Re-entry Little's rejection of a proposal to recover the mine's ventilation fan, which is considered the likely source of the 2010 explosion. Some of the families and supporters launched a social media campaign and an online petition, titled "Help stop critical evidence in Pike River mine from being locked away for ever!" The families also gained support internationally, including from mineworkers and experts in the UK and Australia.

On 9 July, a group representing 20 Pike River families blocked the mine access road in order to prevent the Pike River Recovery Agency from permanently closing the mine. A representative of the Pike River families also sought a court injunction to prevent the Pike River mine from being permanently sealed.

On 17 November 2021, New Zealand Police announced that the remains of at least two men had been found within the alpine bolter section of the mine. This discovery came following the recent drilling of boreholes and the introduction of specialised cameras into the mine. Police Superintendent Pete Read stated that it was not possible to recover the remains due to their location.

By 9 March 2022, a total of eight bodies had been found as a result of deep bore drilling operations.

By 23 June 2023, with the conclusion of bore drilling operations by police, a total of twelve of the twenty-nine bodies had been located within the mine. The photos taken indicated that the victims likely died instantaneously in the initial explosion and therefore would have been unable to be rescued prior to the second explosion.

== Legacy ==
The disaster was the primary motivator in updating New Zealand's health and safety legislation, resulting in establishment of WorkSafe New Zealand in December 2013 and the Health and Safety at Work Act 2015.

The Blackball Museum of Working Class History includes a memorial wheel dedicated to those who have died at work in New Zealand, with a special section for the miners who died in the Pike River Mine disaster. It was the site of a memorial service to mark the fourth anniversary of the event; wreaths were laid and a choir performed a piece dedicated to the victims.

A feature length film titled Pike River directed by Robert Sarkies was released in New Zealand on 30 October 2025, a little under a month before the fifteenth anniversary of the disaster. The film dramatises the victims' families in the aftermath, focusing on Anna Osborne and Sonya Rockhouse (portrayed by Melanie Lynskey and Robyn Malcolm, respectively).

== See also ==
- Brunner Mine disaster
- Firedamp
- List of disasters in New Zealand by death toll
- Mining in New Zealand
