= Pike River Recovery Agency =

Former New Zealand government department

- Māori: Te Kāhui Whakamana Rua Tekau mā Iwa

Agency overview
- Formed: 31 January 2018
- Dissolved: 1 July 2022
- Superseding agency: Department of Conservation
- Jurisdiction: New Zealand
- Annual budget: Total budget for 2019/20; Vote Pike River Re-entry ▼$12,099,000
- Website: Pike River Recovery Agency at the Wayback Machine (archived 29 June 2022)

The Pike River Recovery Agency (Māori: Te Kāhui Whakamana Rua Tekau mā Iwa) was a stand-alone New Zealand Government department. Established in 2018, its stated aim was to work with families of victims of the 2010 Pike River Mine disaster to plan and facilitate the manned re-entry of the mine's drift. The Agency's purpose was to gather evidence on the disaster with the goals of preventing future mining accidents, giving the Pike River families closure and, if possible, recovering the bodies of the deceased miners.

The agency was disestablished on 1 July 2022, with management of the former Pike River Mine being transferred to the Department of Conservation.

== History ==
=== Formation ===
Minister for Pike River Re-Entry Andrew Little announced the formation of the agency on 20 November 2017, with its formal establishment due to take place on 31 January 2018. The Pike River Recovery Agency would be an establishment unit within the Ministry of Business, Innovation and Employment (MBIE). The Agency would be headed by a Chief Executive recruited by the State Services Commission. The Agency planned to have formulated a plan for mine re-entry by the end of March 2018. The Government allocated NZ$23 million to fund the agency's operations and mine re-entry over a three-year period.

The Pike River Recovery Agency would also take over ownership of Pike River mine from Solid Energy, which was scheduled to enter into liquidation in mid-March 2018. After the planned re-entry, ownership of Pike River will return to the Department of Conservation (DOC), including a planned Pike29 Memorial Track, as part of Paparoa National Park.

On 31 January 2018, the Pike River Recovery Agency formally came into existence with its headquarters being based in Greymouth on the West Coast.

This followed a case which saw WorkSafe make prosecutions under the Health and Safety in Employment Act against Pike River Coal Ltd, and VLI Drilling Ltd. WorkSafe also laid 12 charges against a director and the CEO of Pike River Coal, Peter Whittall.

These charges related to the management of the risk of methane gas explosion at Pike River Mine, and the lack of ventilation, which is assumed to have caused the explosion. Pike River Coal pleaded not guilty to these charges. The Trial Judge, Farish J, stipulated that the company’s failure to ventilate the mine sufficiently and to manage the risks associated with methane gas had been causative of the explosions. The company was convicted on nine charges in April 2013.

The Court fined Pike River Coal Ltd $760,000, and ordered them to pay $3.41 million in reparations to survivors, and families of the deceased. Due to the company's bankruptcy, no reparations were ever paid. The Supreme Court would later deem this ruling unlawful

=== Re-entry efforts ===
On 19 April 2018, Little entered the Pike River Mine portal with Pike Family representatives Anna Osborne and Sonya Rockhouse to demonstrate that a safe re-entry was possible. He promised that the Coalition Government would re-enter the drift to recover evidence and the remains of loved ones.

On 21 May 2019, the Pike River Recovery Agency's chief operating officer Dinghy Pattinson led a recovery team which breached the concrete seal to the mine drift. The occasion was marked by family members releasing 29 yellow balloons and calling out the names of those who died. Re-entry and recovery operations were expected to take several months and would consist of three phases. The first team of miners would assess hazards and establish supporting infrastructure. A second forensically-focussed mining team were to be tasked with collecting evidential material. A third team provided mining services including gas monitoring, communication lines and ventilation bags. Once completed, the site was expected to be refurbished and returned to the Department of Conservation by June 2020.

On 10 June 2020, Minister for Pike Mine Re-entry Little announced that it was "impractical" to expect the remains of the fallen miners to be recovered due to the dangerous conditions. Instead, recovery efforts would focus on gathering evidence for the homicide case. The cost of the recovery project had risen from NZ$23 million to NZ$35 million, with concerns that the figure could reach NZ$50 million.

On 17 February 2021, the Pike River Recovery Agency reached the roof fall 2.26 kilometres up the mine's access tunnel, marking the end point of its journey and ending any plans of recovering the bodies of the fallen miners. The Agency would now focus on conducting forensic work in the Pit Bottom in Stone area required for the New Zealand Police investigation.

In early June 2021, 22 of the 29 victims' families filed for a judicial review challenging Minister for Pike Mine Re-entry Little's rejection of a proposal to recover the mine's ventilation fan, which is considered the likely source of the 2010 explosion. In response, the Recovery Agency claimed that the proposal underestimated the time and costs involved in recovering the fan, and that there were various technical issues involved.

On 9 July 2021, a group representing 20 Pike River families blocked the mine access road in an attempt to prevent the Agency from permanently closing the mine. A representative of the Pike River families also sought a court injunction to prevent the Pike River mine from being permanently sealed.

By early March 2022, a total of eight bodies had been found as a result of deep bore drilling operations. However, the bodies were unable to be retrieved due to the unstable nature of the former mine.

=== Closure ===
On 30 March 2022, Agency acting chief executive Michelle Wessing announced that the Pike River Recovery Agency would complete its rehabilitation work at the Pike River site that week with plans to hand over the site to the Department of Conservation on 1 April. In addition, she confirmed that the Agency would be disestablished on 30 June 2022 while its Greymouth office would cease operations when its lease expired on 29 April. While the Government had initially budgeted NZ$23 million for the Agency, this figure had risen to NZ$51 million by late March 2022. Wessing confirmed that the Agency had a total unaudited operation expenditure of NZ$48 million.

On 23 May 2022, the Agency issued a statement that it had completed its stated objectives to safely re-enter and recover the Pike River Mine drift, give closure to the Pike River miners' families, promoting accountability and helping to prevent future mining tragedies. Prior to its planned closure on 1 July 2022, its website was decommissioned on 30 May 2022. In addition to assuming management of the site, DOC also gained custody of the mine records. MBIE will complete limited disestablishment activities until 31 December 2022 and assumed control of the Agency's non-mining records.
