= Health and Safety at Work (Hazardous Substances) Regulations 2017 =

New Zealand legislation

The Health and Safety at Work (Hazardous Substances) Regulations 2017 is a New Zealand statutory instrument made under the provisions of the Health and Safety at Work Act 2015.

The regulations set out controls on the use and management of a wide range of general and specific substances, how they may be used and stored and the penalties for failing to comply general requirements imposed on employers to protect employees and other persons from the hazards of substances used at work by risk assessment, control of exposure, health surveillance and incident planning. There are also duties on employees to take care of their own exposure to hazardous substances.

It define hazardous as

Hazardous substance means, unless expressly provided otherwise by regulations or an EPA notice, any substance

(a) with 1 or more of the following intrinsic properties, (i) explosiveness, (ii) flammability, (iv) corrosiveness, (v) toxicity (including chronic toxicity), (vi) ecotoxicity, with or without bioaccumulation; or

(b) which on contact with air or water (other than air or water where the temperature or pressure has been artificially increased or decreased) generates a substance with any 1 or more of the properties specified in this paragraph

It includes requirements for labelling and signage of hazardous substance containers wherever they are used and stored, to keep inventories of hazardous substances, have risk management procedures and policies and must ensure that workers are effectively trained and supervised.

Further sections relate to specific storage and containments rules and to specific substances and gases including pressurised vessels.
