= Christopher Harder =

Canadian-born lawyer

- Born: 1948 (age 77–78); Vancouver, British Columbia, Canada
- Education: University of Auckland
- Occupation: Barrister (disbarred)

Christopher Lloyd Harder (born 1948) is a Canadian-born former lawyer based in Auckland, New Zealand.

He became a prominent criminal lawyer in New Zealand through his involvement in several high-profile trials, including the 1989 death of Peter Plumley-Walker, about which he published a book. In 1988 he was briefly detained in Fiji when attempting to represent a number of Fijian citizens accused of plotting against the post-coup government there. He was disbarred in New Zealand in 2006 after admitting professional misconduct. He has since worked as an administrator and marketing manager.

== Early life ==
Harder was born a twin in Vancouver, Canada in 1948. He emigrated to New Zealand in 1976 and studied law at the University of Auckland. He was admitted to the bar in New Zealand in May 1983.

== Legal career ==
=== Fiji ===
In 1988, Harder was briefly detained in Fiji after travelling there to represent eight Rotuman chiefs accused of sedition and five Fijian Indians charged following the discovery of a cache of Soviet-made weapons. Harder published a book about his experience, The Guns of Lautoka.

=== Plumley-Walker murder trial ===
In 1989, the decomposing body of cricket umpire Peter Plumley-Walker was found floating in New Zealand's Huka Falls with its hands and feet bound, allegedly after a bondage session gone wrong. Teenage dominatrix Renee Chignell (then aged 18) and her boyfriend Neville Walker – the latter represented by Harder – were originally convicted of murder but were eventually acquitted in June 1991 after two retrials. This is believed to be the only case in New Zealand legal history where two individuals have faced three murder trials and have been acquitted after the third. The second jury was unable to reach a verdict, while the third jury accepted the defence claim that Plumley-Walker was already dead when Chignell and Walker threw his body off the Falls, Plumley-Walker having died accidentally during a "punishment" session. Harder published a book about the case, Mercy, Mistress, Mercy.

=== 2003 assault charge ===
In 2003, Harder pleaded guilty to a charge of assaulting fellow lawyer Barry Hart in an Auckland courtroom scuffle. His defence was that his use of the prescription weight-loss medication Duromine had affected his temperament. Harder was discharged without conviction after offering to pay court costs and making a donation to charity.

=== 2006 disbarment ===
In 2006, Harder was struck off New Zealand's law practitioners' roll by the Law Practitioners Disciplinary Tribunal for several offences, including taking a client to a brothel and making him simulate the sexual violence he had been charged with committing; swearing at the client and drinking alcohol while taking instructions; sexual harassment and threatening clients. In 2008, he applied to be reinstated to the roll of barristers and solicitors but eventually withdrew his application.

== Post-disbarment career ==
=== Tonga ===
In 2007, Harder was controversially permitted to practise law in Tonga to defend people charged in relation to the 2006 Nukuʻalofa riots, despite still being struck off in New Zealand.

=== Film work ===
In October 2016, it was announced that TVNZ was making a dramatization of the Peter Plumley-Walker case entitled Mistress, Mercy, in which Harder was portrayed by actor Gavin Rutherford. Harder declined to participate in this production, saying the screenplay omitted critical details and was overly sympathetic to defendant Renee Chignell. Instead, Harder agreed to play himself in a separate feature-length film about the case, directed by Ken Khan. (As of 2026, Khan's film, entitled The Plumley-Walker Murder Trials, has not been released.)

=== Pike River Mine disaster campaign ===
Harder has been involved in advocacy for the families of victims of 2010's Pike River Mine disaster, in which 29 miners lost their lives.

== Published books ==
- The Guns of Lautoka (Sunshine Press, 1988). ISBN 9780959790108
- Mercy Mistress Mercy: The Plumley Walker Saga (Harper Collins, 1991). ISBN 9781869500641
- Through the Legal Looking Glass (Howling at the Moon, 2002). ISBN 9780958205498
