= Pike River Mine =

Coal mine on New Zealand's South Island; site of the eponymous disaster

- Location in New Zealand
- Location: Greymouth, West Coast Region, New Zealand; 42°12′19″S 171°28′56″E
- Products: Coal
- Type: Underground
- Opened: November 2008
- Closed: 2011
- Company: Department of Conservation
- Acquired: 2022

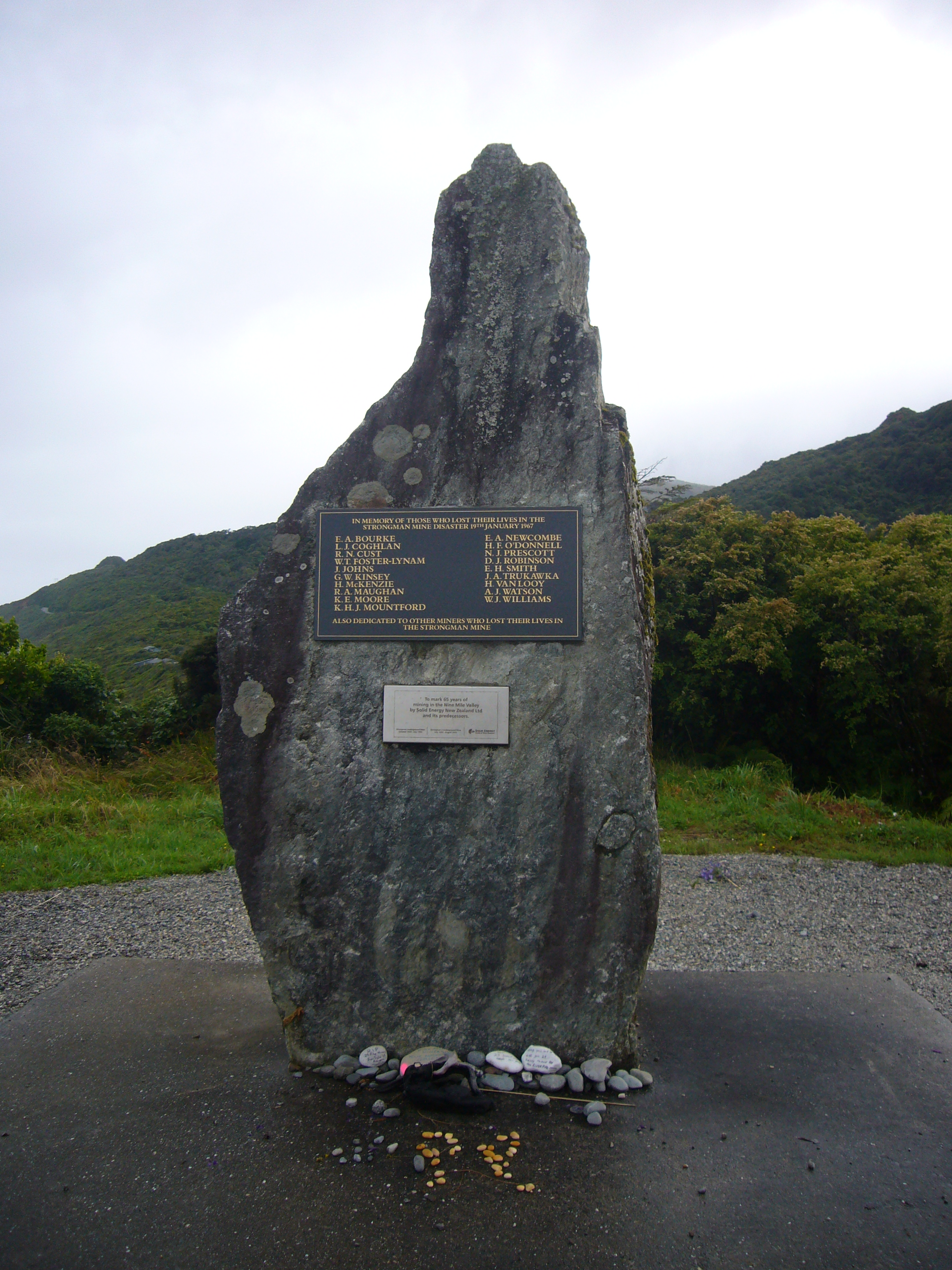
The Strongman Mine memorial on State Highway 6 in the South Island of New Zealand. Memorial stones for the Pike River Mine disaster can be seen at the base.

The Pike River Mine is a coal mine formerly operated by Pike River Coal 46 km (29 mi) north-northeast of Greymouth in the West Coast Region of New Zealand's South Island. It is the site of the Pike River Mine disaster that occurred on 19 November 2010, leading to the deaths of 29 men whose remains have not been recovered. The mine and its assets are owned by the Department of Conservation, whom, on 1 July 2022, assumed ownership and management following the dissolution of the Pike River Recovery Agency. The former mine site and its surrounding land are a part of Paparoa National Park.

The mine was to begin production in early 2008, and was initially expected to produce around one million tonnes of coal per year for around 20 years, making the mine the second-largest coal export mine in the country, as well as the largest underground coal mine of the country. The estimate for production was reduced to between 320,000 and 360,000 tonnes for 2011. The coal of the mine is described as "New Zealand's largest known deposit of high fluidity and quality hard coking coal" (a type of coal in high demand for iron smelting), and was expected to earn around NZ$170 million in export income annually.

Various setbacks occurred during late 2007 and early 2008 delaying the start of coal production. While mine operators were originally confident that production would still start in 2008 (having reached within 400 m (1,300 ft) of the coal seam in early 2008), in mid-2009 the mine was still not producing at expected levels, with the target of the first 60,000 tons of coal to be shipped having slipped to early 2010. The mine operators noted that technical difficulties with several mining machines were to blame for the delays, which also forced the company to ask for an extension from its financiers. In February 2010, the first export shipment of 20,000 tons of coal was delivered to India for use in steel production.

An explosion on Friday 19 November 2010 trapped 29 workers inside the mine. Rescuers delayed entering the mine, due to the risk of another explosion. On 24 November, a second explosion occurred and it was subsequently presumed that the workers could not have survived. A third explosion occurred at 3:39 pm 26 November; it appeared to be smaller than the first two. A fourth explosion occurred on 28 November at 1:55 pm.

Initial recovery efforts were abandoned after rescue robots were lost and after insolvency the Pike River Recovery Agency was formed and re-entered the mine in May 2019. As of July 2020 the recovery team had penetrated over 1.4 km into the mine and recovered four original rescue robots previously lost.

On 17 February 2021, the Pike River Recovery Agency reported that it had reached a point 2.2 km up the mine access tunnel to the site of a rockfall. This was the furthest point into the mine that the agency planned to go, and the work to this point had cost approximately $50 million. On 23 March 2021, the minister responsible for Pike River Re-entry, Andrew Little, stated that it would be too difficult and expensive to go any further into the mine.

== Approvals history ==
The mine has a development and consenting history going back to the 1970s, with the first geologists and surveyors having explored the area in the 1940s. The mine is located approximately halfway between Greymouth and Reefton, close to the Pike Stream, a tributary of the Big River in a region that already has a long history of coal- and gold-mining activity. It is located on Crown land administered by the Department of Conservation, and adjacent to the Paparoa National Park. Because of the status of the land, Pike River Coal Ltd had to obtain the Minister of Conservation's agreement to an access arrangement for mining under Section 61(2) of the Crown Minerals Act 2001.

On 12 March 2004, Minister of Conservation Chris Carter approved the access arrangement for Pike River Coal Ltd. The arrangement included four 1.5-metre (4.9 ft)-wide emergency escape shafts within the boundaries of Paparoa National Park and a requirement for Pike River Coal Ltd to spend NZ$70,000 annually on conservation projects. Carter stated that the "safeguards and compensation" outweighed the inconsistencies with objectives of the Conservation Act 1987 and the relevant management plans.

Due to the location, the conditions of the access arrangement included special considerations for the environment, such as minimising tree felling and a requirement to reinstate all above-ground areas after the cessation of mining. Opponents of the mine strongly criticised the approval of the access agreement, noting that the coal is not intended for domestic use but simply a commercial operation, and thus should not have been allowed to go forward in a sensitive location. Forest & Bird also criticised the fact that the Minister of Conservation chose to ignore the report from the Department of Conservation stating that the mine would be damaging to the local environment. Greenpeace Aotearoa New Zealand also criticised the project for furthering the use of fossil fuels instead of developing sustainable alternatives.

== Mine operation ==
In October 2008, coal production started and in November 2008, Gerry Brownlee, the Minister of Energy and Resources and Minister for Economic Development, formally opened the mine. However, production was slow initially, and took until 2009/2010 to reach significant levels.

The coal is mined 200 m (660 ft) underground, at 800 m (2,600 ft) above sea level, quarrying coal from the Brunner coal seam. The coal is taken from the mine via a 'drift', a gently sloping 5-degree tunnel 2.3 km (1.4 mi) long. This tunnel has taken large amounts of dynamite to create, as the rock is described as being up to four times harder than concrete. Since the coal face will be located higher than the tunnel entrance, removal of material to a processing plant 10.6 km (6.6 mi) away will be via a slurry pipeline (with a 35% solids share).

Another major feature of the underground works is a 110-metre (360 ft)-deep ventilation shaft. After local ground conditions were found to be worse than expected, it was excavated with a raise-bore system excavating the 4.25 m (13.9 ft) ventilation shaft from a 0.35 m (1.1 ft) pilot drill shaft. Access to the top of the ventilation shaft is by helicopter only, even during construction, as conservation restrictions do not allow roads to be built to reach this point. This shaft partially collapsed in 2008 causing further production delays.

The mine also includes underground excavation for the coal slurry handling facility and mine water storage and pumping equipment, with several large galleries of up to 5.5 m (18 ft) width and 11 m (36 ft) height to be excavated. As of 2010, the mine has three main "drives" (shafts).

Originally, once at the processing plant, coal was to be trucked to Greymouth for reshipment at the local port. On 27 November 2007, it was announced that the coal from the mine would be transported to Lyttelton for export rather than the previously proposed shipment via the Port of Taranaki. The company has reserved under contract with Toll Rail (now KiwiRail) 1.3 million tonnes of capacity for their coal on the Midland Line between Greymouth and Christchurch, which since upgrading by ONTRACK has a total capacity of four million tonnes per annum.

The mine was to have about 150 full-time staff, though in 2007–2008, there were problems filling all positions, partly because of high demand for the same occupations in the Australian and international job markets. In February 2010, Pike River Mine made its first export shipment of 20,000 tonnes of premium hard coking coal to India.

The mine is estimated to have generated about $80 million of economic benefits to the West Coast Region, about $13 million of that in wages.

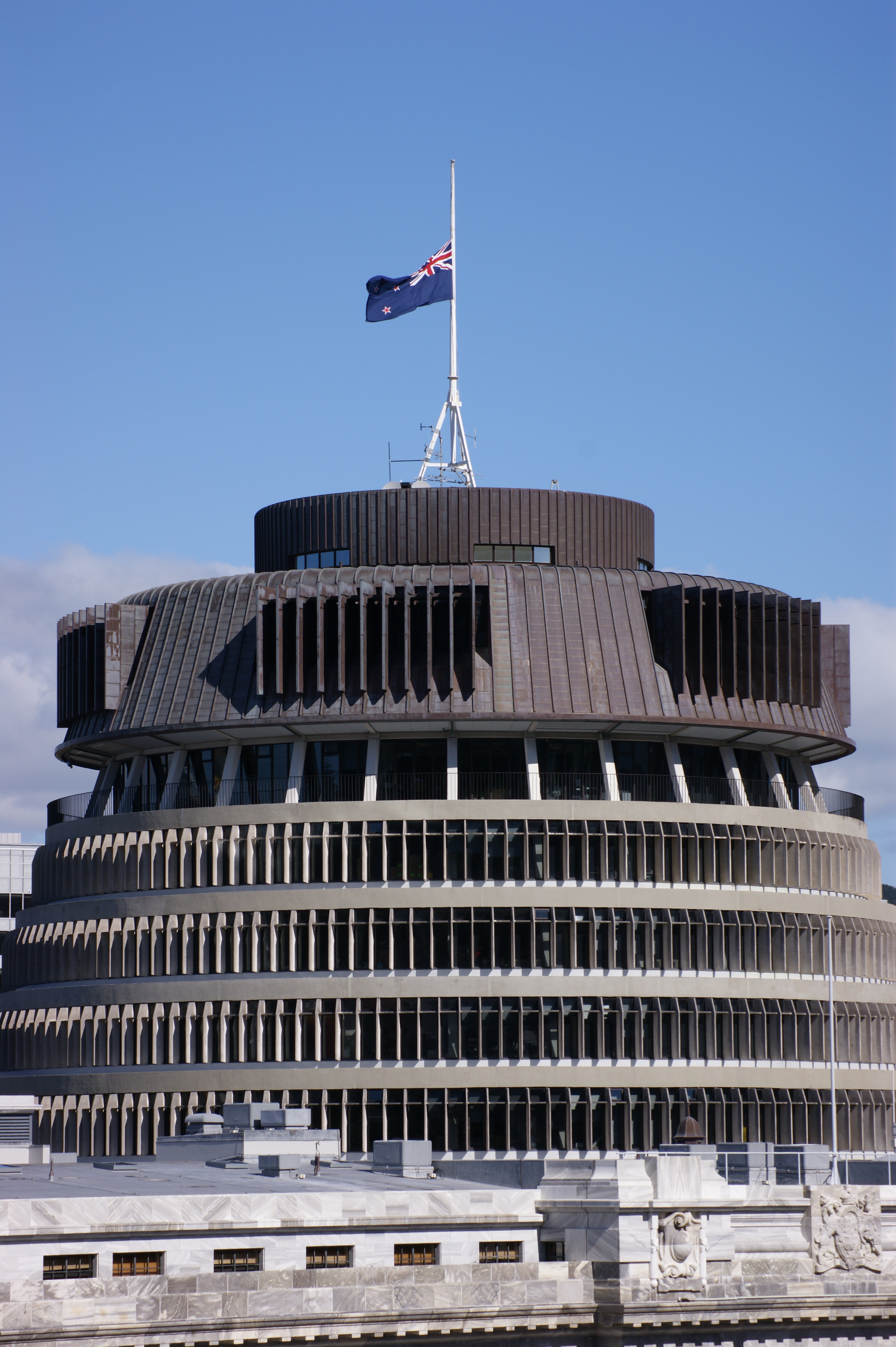
The New Zealand flag hangs at half mast on the Executive Wing of Parliament to mark the official memorial service for the 29 miners on 2 December 2010.

== 2010 mine disaster ==
On 19 November 2010, an explosion in the mine left 29 people dead 2,200 metres (7,200 ft) from the mine's entrance. The mine is around 160 metres (520 ft) below ground, but is primarily accessed horizontally as it lies under the Paparoa Range. Two miners more than 1,000 metres (3,300 ft) from the mine entrance received moderate injuries after being knocked over by the blast. It was predicted it could be several days before the mine was safe enough for rescue workers to enter, as the gases inside were feared to still be explosive. When a borehole was drilled into the area where the miners were thought to be, a level of 95% methane gas was found with the remainder primarily carbon monoxide and it appeared there was little chance of finding any of the miners alive. Although families had held out hope that some of the miners may have survived, it was believed by the rescue team that all had been killed by the initial explosion. The mine had not collapsed and air was blowing freely throughout the tunnels indicating that there were no obstructions to survivors leaving the mine or indicating their presence by tapping on pipes or calling for help.

At 2:37 PM NZDT on 24 November, a second explosion occurred, which was so severe that later that afternoon Peter Whittall (CEO of Pike River Coal) announced that it was extremely unlikely that any of the miners were still alive, as the magnitude of the second explosion and the high levels of toxic gases were too great for anyone to be able to survive.

A third explosion occurred at 3:39 PM 26 November; it appeared to be smaller than the first two. On Sunday, 28 November at 1:55 PM NZDT, a fourth explosion occurred. Flames and smoke poured out of the mine causing nearby scrub to catch fire. Whittall stated there was now a coal fire burning in the mine rather than a gas fire. It is unknown at this time if the actual coal seam is on fire or if it is "rubbish" coal that has been dislodged from previous explosions.

A mine expert theorised that a blast furnace level of heat could have occurred within the mine, reaching over 1,200 °C (2,190 °F). A collapse of any part of the mine was however considered unlikely because of the strength of the construction.

On 10 November 2011 charges were laid against 3 parties in the Greymouth District Court. The charges relate to alleged Health & Safety failings at the mine. At the time of writing the parties against whom the charges have been laid have been withheld.

In December 2012, Prime Minister John Key said he would apologise in person to the families of the deceased, for the Government's weak regulations and inadequate inspection regime. The Minister of Labour Kate Wilkinson resigned her portfolio on 5 November 2012 following the Royal Commission's criticism of her department.

== Former holding company ==
Pike River Coal Ltd was listed on the New Zealand and Australian stock exchanges. It raised NZ$85 million in additional capital for expanding the mine in 2007. As of August 2007, over NZ$100 million had already been invested into developing the mine.

The development was valued at NZ$2.3 billion and was initially held by New Zealand Oil & Gas (29% stake plus options and bonds) as well as the two Indian companies, Gujarat NRE Coke Limited (17% share), and Saurashtra Fuels Private Limited (15% share), with the two latter companies intending to buy about half the running production of the mine's coal. After the IPO, the ownership percentages changed to NZ Oil and Gas 31%, Gujarat NRE Coke 10%, Saurashtra Fuels 8.5%, with private minority shareholders holding 7.9% and the remaining 42.5% having been sold to the general public.

== Economic aftermath ==
On 13 December 2010, Pike River Coal Ltd was put into receivership, with three partners in PricewaterhouseCoopers appointed as receivers. On 15 December 2010, it was announced that about 114 of 157 staff in the company would be made redundant immediately, with some severance benefits paid out of the remaining company funds. It was also announced that it would be unlikely that the further numbers of contracting staff also unemployed or unpaid due to the mine accident would receive any money, as they legally ranked low in the order of creditors.

Pike River Coal originally stated that they hoped to be able to reopen the mine, hopefully before the completion of the inquiry. There is also some concern about the direct economic consequences of the current mine closure, as contracts for work related to the mine have been cancelled or are stalled. The mine remains closed as of the end of 2017, with no indications when or if it would reopen. Most staff have been made redundant, and many contractors are also unemployed or remain unpaid for earlier work.

In early 2011, it was reported that the receiver was considering different ways of treating the remaining assets of the Pike River Mine Ltd company. While it was possible that the mine would be sold, the option of fencing the area and returning it to the Department of Conservation was a 'worst-case' possibility. On 9 March 2011, the receivers took over full control of the mine from the NZ Police.

In March 2011, Solid Energy was looking at purchasing the coal rights and access arrangements. The company said that any proposal to buy and reactivate the mine would include recovery of the dead miner's bodies, if feasible. They also noted that they saw the potential need to combine underground with opencast mining at the site. With the site sitting on conservation land, this is likely to be controversial. Open-cast mining in a national Park is banned by the Crown Minerals Act. The Pike River mine reaches the Brunner coal seam at depths of 150 to 200 metres below ground level. This is deeper than other NZ open-cast coal mines and likely to be uneconomic.

Following the liquidation of Pike River Coal, Solid Energy purchased the assets of the company. However, in 2014 Solid Energy decided that it was too risky to re-enter the mine to recover any remains from the mine.

In August 2011, KiwiRail blamed the Canterbury Earthquakes and "loss of Pike River Mine volumes" for its poor end-of-year result in 2010 – 2011.

Following the liquidation of Pike River Coal, the government purchased 3580 ha of land around the Pike River Mine. Environment minister Nick Smith announced on 15 November 2015 that the land is to be added to the Paparoa National Park, and a new track is to be constructed through the park as a memorial to the 29 miners lost in the 2010 Pike River Mine disaster. The Paparoa Track is a 55 km walking and mountain biking track that runs from Blackball to the east of the Paparoa Range north and west to Punakaiki on the West Coast. The track is New Zealand's latest "Great Walk". At about the mid-way point on the track, a branch known as the Pike29 Memorial Track descends to the site of the Pike River mine.

== Mine re-entry ==
During the 2017 general election, the-then Leader of the Opposition Jacinda Ardern pledged that if elected a Labour Government would support a manned re-entry of the mine with the goals of recovering bodies and investigating the cause of the explosion. Following the formation of a Labour-led coalition government, the Minister for Pike Mine Re-entry Andrew Little announced the creation of a stand-alone government department called the Pike River Recovery Agency to facilitate efforts to re-enter the Pike River mine and recover the bodies of the deceased miners.

On 19 April 2018, the Minister for Pike Mine Re-entry Little entered the Pike River Mine portal with Pike Family representatives Anna Osborne and Sonya Rockhouse to demonstrate that a safe re-entry was possible. He reiterated the Coalition Government's promise to re-enter the drift in order to recover evidence and the remains of the deceased miners. Following delays, a recovery team led by Pike River Recovery Agency official Dinghy Pattinson entered the mine on 21 May 2019. Body recovery and forensic operations were expected to take several months. The occasion was marked by family members releasing 29 yellow balloons and calling out the names of those who died. Re-entry and recovery operations was to consist of three phases. The first team of miners would re-enter to assess hazards and establish supporting infrastructure. A second forensically-focused mining team would then enter the mine to examine and remove any evidential material. A third team would provide mining services including gas monitoring, communications lines and ventilation bags. Once completed, the site is expected to be refurbished and handed back to the Department of Conservation.

On 17 February 2021, the Pike River Recovery Agency reported that it had reached a point 2.2 kilometres up the mine access tunnel to the site of a rockfall. This was the furthest point into the mine that the agency planned to go, and the work to this point had cost approximately $50 million. The Agency would now focus on conducting forensic work in the Pit Bottom in the Stone area required for the New Zealand Police investigation. On 23 March 2021, the Minister responsible for Pike River Re-entry, Andrew Little, stated that it was too hard and too expensive to go any further into the mine.

In mid-May 2021, the Government began reviewing an NZ$8 million plan submitted by a group representing 23 Pike River families to recover the mine's ventilation fan, which is considered to be the most likely source of the 2010 explosion.

In early June 2021, 22 victims' families filed for a judicial review challenging Minister for Pike Mine Re-entry Little's rejection of a proposal to recover the mine's ventilation fan.

In early July 2021, a group representing 20 Pike River families blocked the mine access road in order to prevent the Pike River Recovery Agency from permanently sealing the mine. A representative of the Pike River families also sought a court injunction to prevent the Pike River mine from being permanently sealed.

In mid November 2021, New Zealand Police announced that the remains of at least two men had been found within the alpine bolter section of the mine. They also confirmed the possible discovery of a third body. This discovery came following the recent drilling of boreholes and the introduction of specialised cameras into the mine. Police Superintendent Pete Read stated that it was not possible to recover the remains due to their location.

By 9 March 2022, a total of eight bodies had been located as a result of deep bore drilling operations.

== See also ==
- Mining in New Zealand
- Strongman Mine
