= WorkSafe New Zealand =

New Zealand governmental workplace health and safety regulator

- Mahi Haumaru Aotearoa

Agency overview
- Formed: 16 December 2013
- Preceding agencies: MBIE; Department of Labour
- Jurisdiction: New Zealand
- Headquarters: Wellington, New Zealand
- Employees: 550
- Minister responsible: Brooke Van Velden, Minister for Workplace Relations and Safety
- Agency executives: Jennifer Kerr, Chair; Sharon Thompson, CE
- Website: www.worksafe.govt.nz

WorkSafe is New Zealand's primary workplace health and safety regulator.

WorkSafe has over 550 staff based across New Zealand who work to lift New Zealand's health and safety performance and support workers to return home healthy and safe.

== WorkSafe's role ==
As the regulator of the workplace health and safety system, WorkSafe has three key roles:

Regulatory confidence

- Undertaking regulatory activity to provide confidence that New Zealand workplaces are appropriately managing health and safety
- Enabling New Zealand to have confidence in WorkSafe as the primary health and safety regulator
- Supporting confidence in the effectiveness of the health and safety regulatory regime.

Harm prevention

- Targeting critical risks at all levels (sector and system-wide) using intelligence
- Delivering targeted interventions to address harm drivers (including workforce capability, worker engagement and effective governance)
- Influencing attitudes and behaviour to improve health and safety risk management.

System leadership

- Leading, influencing and leveraging the health and safety system (including other regulators) to improve health and safety outcomes
- Promoting and supporting industry, organisation and worker leadership of health and safety
- Leading by example through WorkSafe's own good practices.

WorkSafe works collaboratively with businesses, undertakings, workers and their representatives to embed and promote good workplace health and safety practices. Some of WorkSafe's functions include:

- Engaging with duty holders (e.g. businesses, undertakings and workers)
- Educating duty holders about their work health and safety responsibilities (e.g. through guidance)
- Enforcing health and safety law.

These responsibilities are defined in legislation, specifically by the Health and Safety at Work Act 2015.

== History ==
WorkSafe New Zealand was established in December 2013 after the Work Safe New Zealand Act was passed a month earlier, as part of the Health and Safety (Pike River Implementation) Bill. The bill was made after a recommendation by a Royal Commission of Inquiry into the 2010 Pike River Mine disaster, which resulted in 29 deaths.

In 2013, the New Zealand Government and WorkSafe set a target to reduce work-related fatal and serious non-fatal injuries by 25 percent by 2020. Between 2018 and 2020, WorkSafe recorded 179 workplace fatalities. Between 2019 and 2021, there were 178 workplace fatalities.

In October 2020, WorkSafe collaborated with FCB New Zealand to launch an online work safety campaign featuring meerkats.

On 3 June 2025, WorkSafe launched a new road cone online tipline. Minister for Workplace Relations and Safety Brooke van Velden says this reflects a new shift from "strict enforcement" towards collaboration with businesses and individuals.

== Other health and safety regulators ==
Other government agencies are also designated to carry out health and safety regulatory functions for certain work. They are:

- Maritime New Zealand for ships as workplaces and work aboard ships.
- Civil Aviation Authority for work preparing aircraft for imminent flight and aircraft in operation.

== Former names ==
Occupational Safety and Health (OSH) was a name used for health and safety functions in the Department of Labour. The name was taken out of use in 2005.

== See also ==
- Ministry of Business, Innovation and Employment: responsible for workplace health and safety strategy, policy, legislation and regulations.
