= Pike River Coal =

Mining company in Australia and New Zealand

Pike River Coal Ltd
- Traded as: NZX: PRC, ASX: PRC
- Industry: Coal mining
- Headquarters: Level 3, Axon House, 1 Willeston Street, Wellington, New Zealand
- Key people: Receivers; John Fisk, David Bridgman and Malcolm Hollis, PricewaterhouseCoopers Former management; Peter W Whittall (CEO) Directors; John Dow (Non-Executive Chairman); Stuart Nattrass (NED); Arun Jagatramka Director; Raymond F Meyer Director; Roy Antony Radford Director; Dipak Agarwalla Director
- Number of employees: 180 (as of 22 September 2010)
- Website: Pike River Coal Ltd

Pike River Coal Ltd was a mining company listed on the New Zealand and Australian stock exchanges. Its primary operation was the Pike River Mine, the site of a mining disaster with 29 deaths on 19 November 2010.

The company first listed and began trading on the New Zealand Exchange on 20 July 2007. On 22 November 2010, trading in the company's shares and options was suspended from the New Zealand Exchange at the company's request, pending developments from the mining disaster. On 12 December 2010 the company was placed in receivership.

Pike River Mine is a coal mine located 46 km east of Greymouth in the West Coast Region of New Zealand's South Island. The operation was set up to mine the Brunner seam, a bituminous coal deposit with lower ash and varying sulphur content.

== Company management ==
Peter W Whittall, a 29-year veteran miner and mining executive, was appointed CEO on 2 October 2010. The Pike River Mine disaster occurred less than two months later. Prior to his role as CEO, Whittall held the position of General Manager Mines and was responsible for on-site construction, mine development and recruitment at the Pike River operation. Whittall became the company spokesperson during the mining disaster.

The previous head of the company was Gordon Ward, who was managing director and CEO from May 2007 until 1 October 2010. Until his departure, Ward had led Pike River Mine from its initial conceptual design for fourteen years.

== History ==
The company raised NZ$85 million in additional capital for expanding the Pike River Mine in 2007. As of August 2007, over NZ$100 million had already been invested into developing the mine. By June 2010, Pike River Coal had invested a total of $288 million in developing the mine. Pike River Coal reported net operating losses of $39 million in the year to June 2010, and $13 million in 2009.

Prior to the mine disaster, Pike River Coal Ltd had a market capitalisation varying around NZD400 million. Pike River Coal was initially held by New Zealand Oil & Gas (29% stake plus options and bonds) as well as the two Indian companies; Gujarat NRE Coke Limited, (17% share), and Saurashtra Fuels Private Limited, (15% share), with the two latter companies intending to buy about half the running production of the mine's coal. After the initial public offering, the percentages changed to NZ Oil and Gas 31%, Gujarat NRE Coke 10%, Saurashtra Fuels 8.5%, private minority shareholders had 7.9% and the remaining 42.5% was sold to the public.

On 12 December 2010, New Zealand Oil & Gas released a statement saying that it had decided to put Pike River Coal into receivership. On 13 December 2010, New Zealand Oil And Gas stated that Pricewaterhouse Coopers had been appointed receivers.

The company was purchased by Solid Energy in 2012, although the government is responsible for investigation and re-entry into the mine.

In July 2013 the company was ordered to pay $110,000 to each of the victims' families and fined $760,000, but in the end didn't pay the fine and only paid $5000 to each family, saying it didn't have the money. In November 2013 Labour Party leader David Cunliffe said if elected, Labour would ensure the families receive the payouts they were awarded.

== Pike River Disaster ==
Friday, 19 November, saw a gathering of workers from Pike River mine and five contracting firms beneath the earth's surface. Just like any other day, the mine echoed with the comings and goings of its workforce, with men entering and exiting at various intervals. However, fate intervened at 3:44 p.m., when an explosion disrupted power and communication within the mine, trapping 31 men below ground. Daniel Rockhouse was in the midst of refilling his loader in the tunnel when the explosion struck, hurling him off his feet and into unconsciousness. Upon regaining awareness amidst the smoke-filled air, he groped through the darkness of the tunnel. After a harrowing journey of about 300 metres, he encountered Russell Smith lying on the ground. Together, they struggled toward the mine entrance, Rockhouse supporting Smith while clutching a rail for stability with his free hand. Both men were afflicted by carbon monoxide poisoning, emerging as the sole survivors among their colleagues. The other 29 workers in the mine succumbed either to the explosion's force or to suffocation from toxic gases.

CCTV footage captured the eruption of a pressure wave and flying debris from the mine entrance. Subsequent aerial inspections revealed significant damage to the backup fan atop the ventilation shaft, accompanied by charred vegetation in the vicinity.

In the ensuing three days, uncertainty clouded discussions regarding the possibility of re-entering the mine. The previous major underground mine explosion, at Strongman mine, had transpired over four decades prior, leaving a dearth of expertise in managing such crises. Although those acquainted with coal mining understood the grim reality that survival for the men within was improbable, public pressure mounted for a re-entry attempt.

Subsequent explosions on three more days 24, 26 and 28 November underscored the perilous conditions, firmly dissuading any re-entry attempts. Consequently, the decision was made to seal the mine for safety reasons.

== See also ==
- Mining in New Zealand
- Mining in Australia
