= Health and Safety at Work Act 2015 =

Act of Parliament in New Zealand

New Zealand Parliament
- Enacted by: New Zealand House of Representatives
- Royal assent: 4 September 2015
- Commenced: 5 September 2015 (part); 4 April 2016 (remainder)

Legislative history
- Bill title: Health and Safety Reform Bill
- Introduced: 10 March 2014
- Committee responsible: Transport and Industrial Relations Committee
- First reading: 13 March 2014
- Voting summary: 121 voted for; None voted against
- Second reading: 30 July 2015
- Voting summary: 63 voted for; 56 voted against; 2 absent
- Third reading: 27 August 2015
- Voting summary: 63 voted for; 58 voted against
- Status: In force

The Health and Safety at Work Act 2015 is the principal piece of legislation defining the statutory obligations of New Zealand business in relation to the safety and welfare of their employees. It shifts the focus from previous legislation which was principally about monitoring and recording incidents related to health and safety to a system where risks are identified and managed before they are able to affect the lives employees, customers and the general public.

A number of regulations have subsequently been created to implement the provisions of the act including Health and Safety at Work (Hazardous Substances) Regulations 2017.

The principal focus of responsibility and action throughout the legislation is the person conducting a business or undertaking (PCBU) rather than the corporate business entity.
