= List of schools in the West Coast Region =

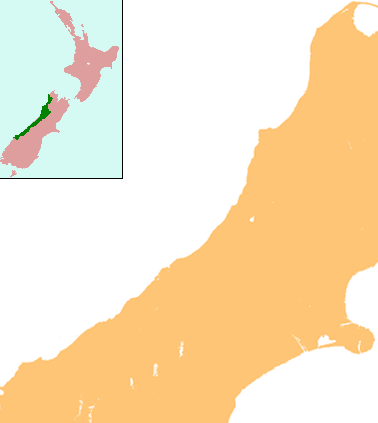
Localities on the West Coast offering secondary education

The West Coast is a region in the South Island of New Zealand. It contains numerous rural primary schools and several small town primary and secondary schools. Area schools in isolated areas provide complete education from primary to secondary level. All schools in the region are coeducational.

In New Zealand schools, students begin formal education in Year 1 at the age of five. Year 13 is the final year of secondary education. Years 14 and 15 refer to adult education facilities.

State schools are those fully funded by the government and at which no fees can be charged, although a donation is commonly requested. A state integrated school is a state school with a special character based on a religious or philosophical belief. The state integrated schools on the West Coast are all Catholic schools. A private school charges fees to its students. The only private school in this region is Gloriavale Christian Community School near Haupiri, which is operated by a religious group.

The decile rating indicates the socio-economic group that the school catchment area falls into. A rating of 1 indicates a poor area; a rating of 10 a well-off one. The decile ratings used here come from the Ministry of Education Te Kete Ipurangi website and from the decile change spreadsheet listed in the references. The deciles were last revised using information from the 2006 Census. The roll of each school changes frequently as students start school for the first time, move between schools, and graduate. The rolls given here are those provided by the Ministry of Education, based on figures from June 2011 roll returns. The Ministry of Education institution number, given in the last column, links to the Education Counts page for each school.

== Buller District ==
The Buller District covers the northern part of the West Coast region. The only 2 towns in the district with more than 1000 people are Westport and Reefton

Name	Years	Area	Authority	Decile	Roll	Website	MOE
Buller High School	9–13	Westport	State	3	358		301
Granity School	1–8	Granity	State	4	30	—	3192
Karamea Area School	1–13	Karamea	State	5	96	—	300
Maruia School	1–8	Maruia	State	9	17	—	3204
Reefton Area School	1–13	Reefton	State	3	175		496
Sacred Heart School	1–8	Reefton	State integrated	4	21	—	3219
St Canice's School	1–8	Westport	State integrated	4	142	—	3220
Westport North School	1–8	Westport	State	4	194		3235
Westport South School	1–8	Westport	State	4	231	—	3236

== Grey District ==
The Grey District lies between the Buller and Westland districts. Greymouth and its satellite towns contain the majority of the district's population.

Name	Years	Area	Authority	Decile	Roll	Website	MOE
Awahono School - Grey Valley	1–8	Ahaura	State	4	102		2105
Barrytown School	1–8	Barrytown	State	4	37		3290
Blaketown School	1–8	Blaketown	State	2	86		3295
Cobden School	1–8	Cobden	State	2	106		3322
Gloriavale Christian School	1–13	Haupiri	Private	N/A	Unknown	—	1587
Greymouth High School	9–13	Greymouth Central	State	4	522		303
Greymouth Main School	1–8	Greymouth Central	State	5	183		3361
John Paul II High School	9–13	Greymouth Central	State integrated	4	191		304
Karoro School	1–8	Karoro	State	8	170		3394
Lake Brunner School	1–8	Moana	State	7	54		2123
Paparoa Range School	1–8	Dobson	State	3	71	—	2106
Paroa School	1–8	Paroa	State	6	169	—	3472
Runanga School	1–8	Runanga	State	3	20		3495
St Patrick's School	1–8	Greymouth Central	State integrated	5	216	—	3538

== Westland District ==
The Westland District is the largest district on the West Coast, and the one with the smallest population. Hokitika is the only substantial town, with a population of just over 3,000 people.

Name	Years	Area	Authority	Decile	Roll	Website	MOE
Fox Glacier School	1–8	Fox Glacier	State	8	5	—	3342
Franz Josef Glacier School	1–8	Franz Josef	State	9	42	—	3343
Haast School	1–8	Haast	State	3	9	—	3363
Hokitika School	1–6	Hokitika	State	4	165	—	3376
Kaniere School	1–6	Kaniere	State	7	111	—	3393
Kokatahi-Kowhitirangi School	1–6	Kokatahi	State	8	37	—	3398
Kumara School	1–8	Kumara	State	5	47		3401
Ross School	1–6	Ross	State	6	9	—	3489
South Westland Area School	1–15	Harihari	State	4	117		306
St Mary's School	1–8	Hokitika	State integrated	5	137	—	3536
Westland High School	7–15	Hokitika	State	6	404		305
Whataroa School	1–8	Whataroa	State	7	20		3592

== Closed schools ==
- Inangahua Junction School, state contributing primary school at Inangahua Junction, closed 15 November 2018.
- Waimangaroa School, state full primary school at Waimangaroa, closed January 2013 due to declining roll numbers.
- Jacobs River School, state full primary school at Jacobs River, closed January 2013 due to declining roll numbers.
