= Ahaura =

Town in the South Island of New Zealand

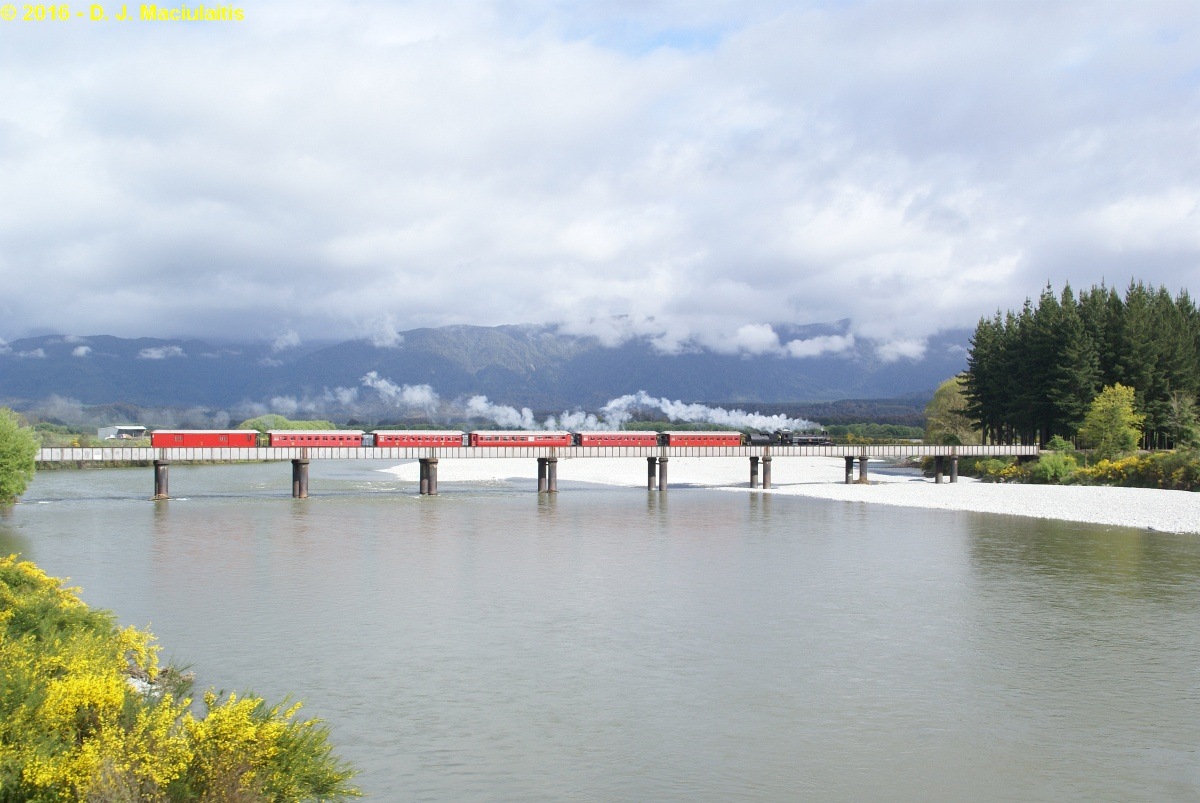
- Ahaura River Bridge
- Interactive map of Ahaura
- Coordinates: 42°20′54″S 171°32′26″E
- Country: New Zealand
- Region: West Coast
- District: Grey District
- Ward: Eastern
- Electorates: West Coast-Tasman; Te Tai Tonga

Government
  - Territorial Authority: Grey District Council
  - Regional council: West Coast Regional Council
  - Mayor of Grey: Tania Gibson
  - West Coast-Tasman MP: Katie Milne
  - Te Tai Tonga MP: Mananui Ramsden

Area
  - Total: 0.39 km^{2} (0.15 sq mi)

Population (June 2025)
  - Total: 120
  - Density: 310/km^{2} (800/sq mi)
- Local iwi: Ngāi Tahu

Ahaura is a town in the West Coast region of New Zealand's South Island, sited where the Ahaura River flows into the Grey River. State Highway 7 and the Stillwater–Ngākawau railway line pass through the town. Greymouth is 34 kilometres (21 mi) to the south-west, and Reefton is 44 kilometres (27 mi) to the north-east.

European settlement of the area began with the establishment of a pastoral run near the junction of the Ahaura and Grey Rivers in 1858.

At one time the town supported six hotels, two butcheries, a bakery, a blacksmith's shop, and a printing office.

== Demographics ==
Ahaura is described by Statistics New Zealand as a rural settlement and covers 0.39 km^{2} (0.15 sq mi). It had an estimated population of 120 as of June 2025, with a population density of 308 people per km^{2}. Ahaura is part of the larger Nelson Creek statistical area.

Historical population for Ahaura
Year	Pop.	±% p.a.
2006	111	—
2013	96	−2.05%
2018	96	+0.00%
2023	102	+1.22%

Ahaura had a population of 102 in the 2023 New Zealand census, an increase of 6 people (6.2%) since the 2018 census, and an increase of 6 people (6.2%) since the 2013 census. There were 57 males and 45 females in 48 dwellings. The median age was 50.6 years (compared with 38.1 years nationally). There were 21 people (20.6%) aged under 15 years, 15 (14.7%) aged 15 to 29, 42 (41.2%) aged 30 to 64, and 30 (29.4%) aged 65 or older.

People could identify as more than one ethnicity. The results were 100.0% European (Pākehā), and 11.8% Māori. English was spoken by 97.1%. No language could be spoken by 2.9% (e.g. too young to talk). The percentage of people born overseas was 8.8, compared with 28.8% nationally.

Religious affiliations were 44.1% Christian. People who answered that they had no religion were 55.9%, and 2.9% of people did not answer the census question.

Of those at least 15 years old, 9 (11.1%) people had a bachelor's or higher degree, 45 (55.6%) had a post-high school certificate or diploma, and 24 (29.6%) people exclusively held high school qualifications. The median income was $38,000, compared with $41,500 nationally. 9 people (11.1%) earned over $100,000 compared to 12.1% nationally. The employment status of those at least 15 was 42 (51.9%) full-time and 15 (18.5%) part-time.

=== Nelson Creek statistical area ===
Nelson Creek statistical area covers 897.84 km^{2} (346.66 sq mi) and had an estimated population of 840 as of June 2025, with a population density of 0.94 people per km^{2}.

Historical population for Nelson Creek
Year	Pop.	±% p.a.
2006	717	—
2013	714	−0.06%
2018	669	−1.29%
2023	759	+2.56%

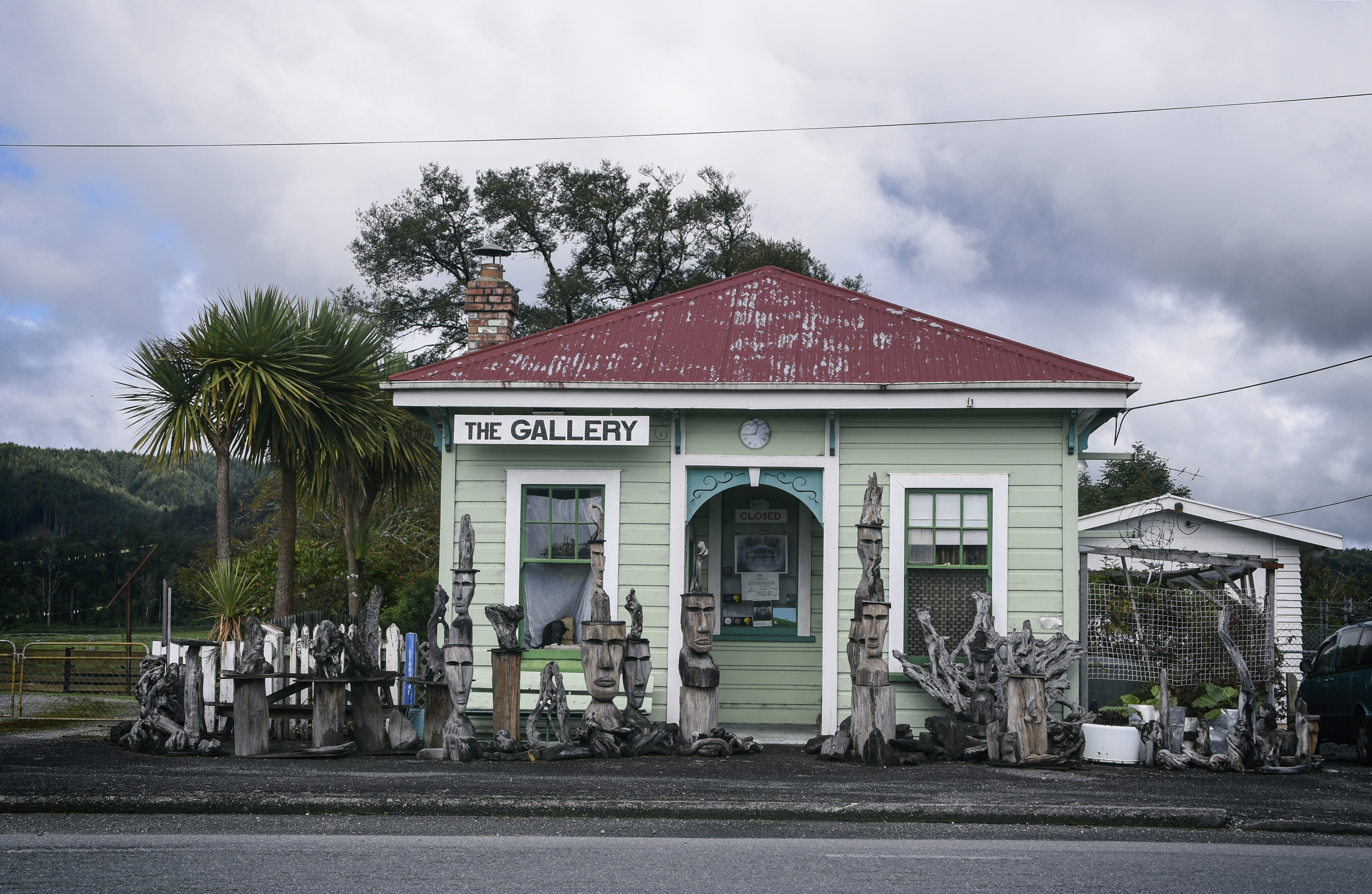
Former post office in Ahaura

Nelson Creek had a population of 759 in the 2023 New Zealand census, an increase of 90 people (13.5%) since the 2018 census, and an increase of 45 people (6.3%) since the 2013 census. There were 414 males, 342 females, and 3 people of other genders in 324 dwellings. 1.2% of people identified as LGBTIQ+. The median age was 44.3 years (compared with 38.1 years nationally). There were 150 people (19.8%) aged under 15 years, 120 (15.8%) aged 15 to 29, 348 (45.8%) aged 30 to 64, and 138 (18.2%) aged 65 or older.

People could identify as more than one ethnicity. The results were 94.1% European (Pākehā); 12.3% Māori; 2.8% Pasifika; 2.0% Asian; 0.4% Middle Eastern, Latin American and African New Zealanders (MELAA); and 2.4% other, which includes people giving their ethnicity as "New Zealander". English was spoken by 97.6%, Māori by 1.6%, and other languages by 3.2%. No language could be spoken by 2.4% (e.g. too young to talk). New Zealand Sign Language was known by 0.4%. The percentage of people born overseas was 8.7, compared with 28.8% nationally.

Religious affiliations were 28.5% Christian, 0.4% Islam, and 1.2% other religions. People who answered that they had no religion were 60.9%, and 8.7% of people did not answer the census question.

Of those at least 15 years old, 54 (8.9%) people had a bachelor's or higher degree, 369 (60.6%) had a post-high school certificate or diploma, and 186 (30.5%) people exclusively held high school qualifications. The median income was $37,100, compared with $41,500 nationally. 36 people (5.9%) earned over $100,000 compared to 12.1% nationally. The employment status of those at least 15 was 321 (52.7%) full-time, 102 (16.7%) part-time, and 12 (2.0%) unemployed.

== Climate ==
Located in the central Grey Valley at an altitude of 80m, Ahaura falls under the Köppen-Geiger climate classification of Cfb (Oceanic), though the nearby Paparoa Range shelters the settlement from moderating seabreezes on summer afternoons, and on winter nights cold air sinks from the Paparoas into the Grey Valley, which results in many more frosts per winter than nearby Greymouth. The area typically observes lower rainfall totals than coastal locations due to the rain-shadow effect of the Paparoa Range.

Climate data for Totara Flat, 77 m (8km NE of Ahaura) (1971–2000)
Month	Jan	Feb	Mar	Apr	May	Jun	Jul	Aug	Sep	Oct	Nov	Dec	Year
Mean daily maximum °C (°F)	22.1 (71.8)	22.5 (72.5)	20.7 (69.3)	17.4 (63.3)	13.7 (56.7)	10.7 (51.3)	10.7 (51.3)	12.4 (54.3)	14.5 (58.1)	16.5 (61.7)	18.5 (65.3)	20.5 (68.9)	16.7 (62.1)
Daily mean °C (°F)	16.3 (61.3)	16.4 (61.5)	14.9 (58.8)	11.9 (53.4)	8.8 (47.8)	6.2 (43.2)	5.7 (42.3)	7.2 (45.0)	9.4 (48.9)	11.4 (52.5)	13.2 (55.8)	15.1 (59.2)	11.4 (52.5)
Mean daily minimum °C (°F)	10.6 (51.1)	10.3 (50.5)	9.0 (48.2)	6.3 (43.3)	3.9 (39.0)	1.7 (35.1)	0.8 (33.4)	2.0 (35.6)	4.4 (39.9)	6.3 (43.3)	8.0 (46.4)	9.6 (49.3)	6.1 (43.0)
Average rainfall mm (inches)	150.8 (5.94)	101.0 (3.98)	125.1 (4.93)	152.9 (6.02)	218.2 (8.59)	155.5 (6.12)	183.7 (7.23)	134.8 (5.31)	180.7 (7.11)	190.4 (7.50)	159.3 (6.27)	183.0 (7.20)	1,935.4 (76.20)
Source: cliflo.niwa.co.nz

== Education ==
Awahono School – Grey Valley is a coeducational full primary (years 1–8) school with a roll of 102 students as of July 2026. The school was formed at the beginning of 2005 from the merger of Ahaura (opened 1872), Moonlight (1889), Ngahere (1888) and Totara Flat (1880) schools.
