= Wharemoa =

Suburb of Greymouth, New Zealand

- Suburb
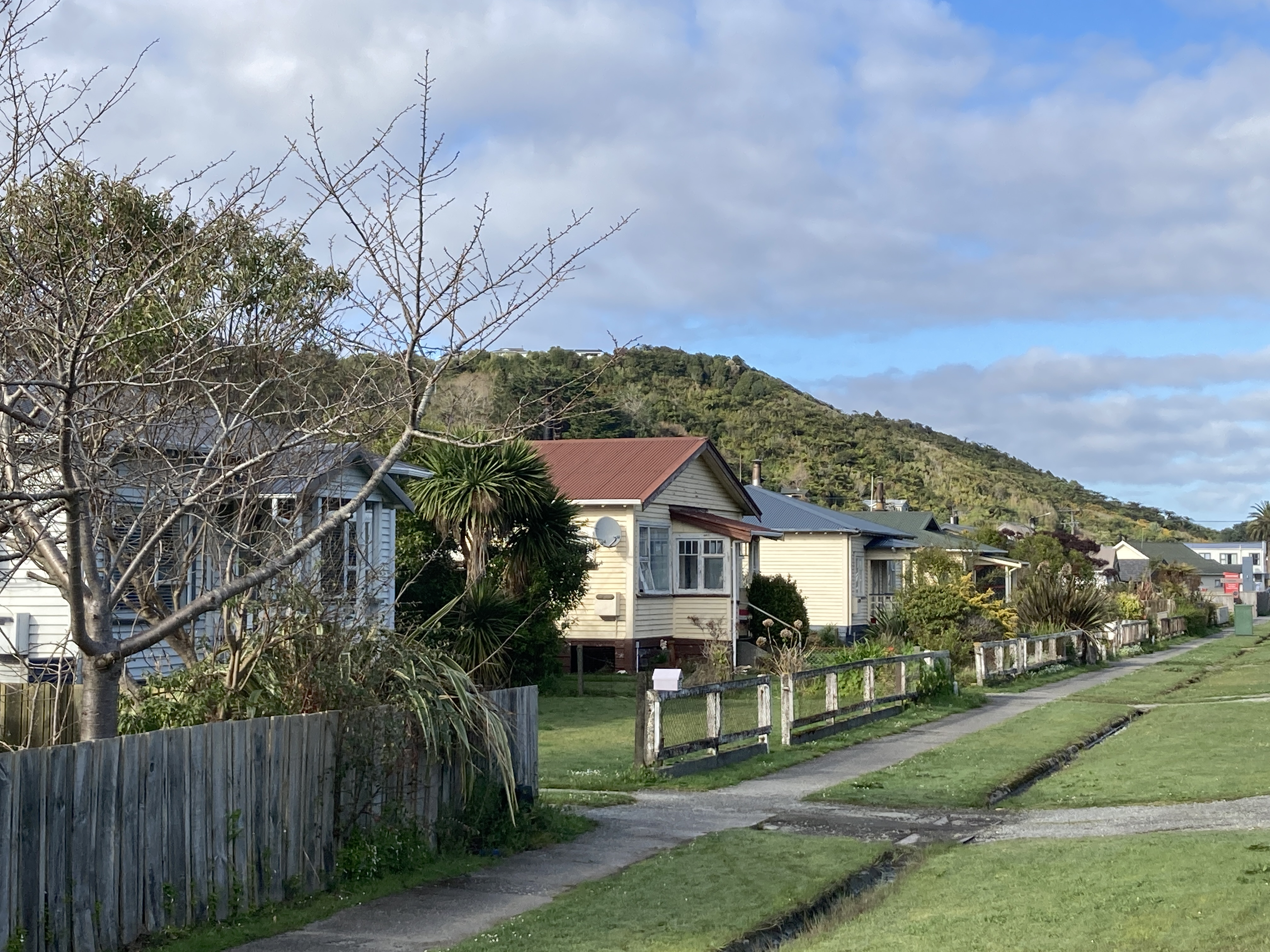
- Interactive map of Wharemoa
- Coordinates: 42.466°S 171.201°E
- Country: New Zealand
- City: Greymouth
- Local authority: Grey District Council
- Electoral ward: Central

Area
  - Land: 124 ha (310 acres)

Population (June 2025)
  - Total: 1,320
  - Density: 1,060/km^{2} (2,760/sq mi)

	Greymouth Central
	Wharemoa
Karoro

Wharemoa is a southeastern suburb of Greymouth on the West Coast of New Zealand. Marsden Road is a major road running through the suburb. Sawyers Creek runs northwest through the suburb to join the Grey River / Māwheranui near its mouth on the Tasman Sea.

== Demographics ==
Marsden statistical area, which roughly corresponds to Wharemoa, covers 1.24 km^{2} (0.48 sq mi). It had an estimated population of 1,320 as of June 2025, with a population density of 1,065 people per km^{2}.

Historical population
Year	Pop.	±% p.a.
2006	1,176	—
2013	1,236	+0.71%
2018	1,221	−0.24%
2023	1,275	+0.87%

Marsden had a population of 1,275 in the 2023 New Zealand census, an increase of 54 people (4.4%) since the 2018 census, and an increase of 39 people (3.2%) since the 2013 census. There were 633 males, 636 females, and 3 people of other genders in 507 dwellings. 1.9% of people identified as LGBTIQ+. The median age was 40.2 years (compared with 38.1 years nationally). There were 264 people (20.7%) aged under 15 years, 183 (14.4%) aged 15 to 29, 576 (45.2%) aged 30 to 64, and 249 (19.5%) aged 65 or older.

People could identify as more than one ethnicity. The results were 88.0% European (Pākehā); 13.9% Māori; 0.9% Pasifika; 7.3% Asian; 0.2% Middle Eastern, Latin American and African New Zealanders (MELAA); and 4.0% other, which includes people giving their ethnicity as "New Zealander". English was spoken by 97.9%, Māori by 2.6%, Samoan by 0.2%, and other languages by 6.8%. No language could be spoken by 1.9% (e.g. too young to talk). New Zealand Sign Language was known by 0.7%. The percentage of people born overseas was 14.6, compared with 28.8% nationally.

Religious affiliations were 32.5% Christian, 0.9% Hindu, 0.7% Islam, 0.2% Māori religious beliefs, 0.5% Buddhist, 0.2% New Age, and 0.9% other religions. People who answered that they had no religion were 56.7%, and 8.0% of people did not answer the census question.

Of those at least 15 years old, 192 (19.0%) people had a bachelor's or higher degree, 552 (54.6%) had a post-high school certificate or diploma, and 270 (26.7%) people exclusively held high school qualifications. The median income was $39,700, compared with $41,500 nationally. 93 people (9.2%) earned over $100,000 compared to 12.1% nationally. The employment status of those at least 15 was 513 (50.7%) full-time, 162 (16.0%) part-time, and 18 (1.8%) unemployed.
