= Moana, New Zealand =

Town in the South Island of New Zealand

Moana
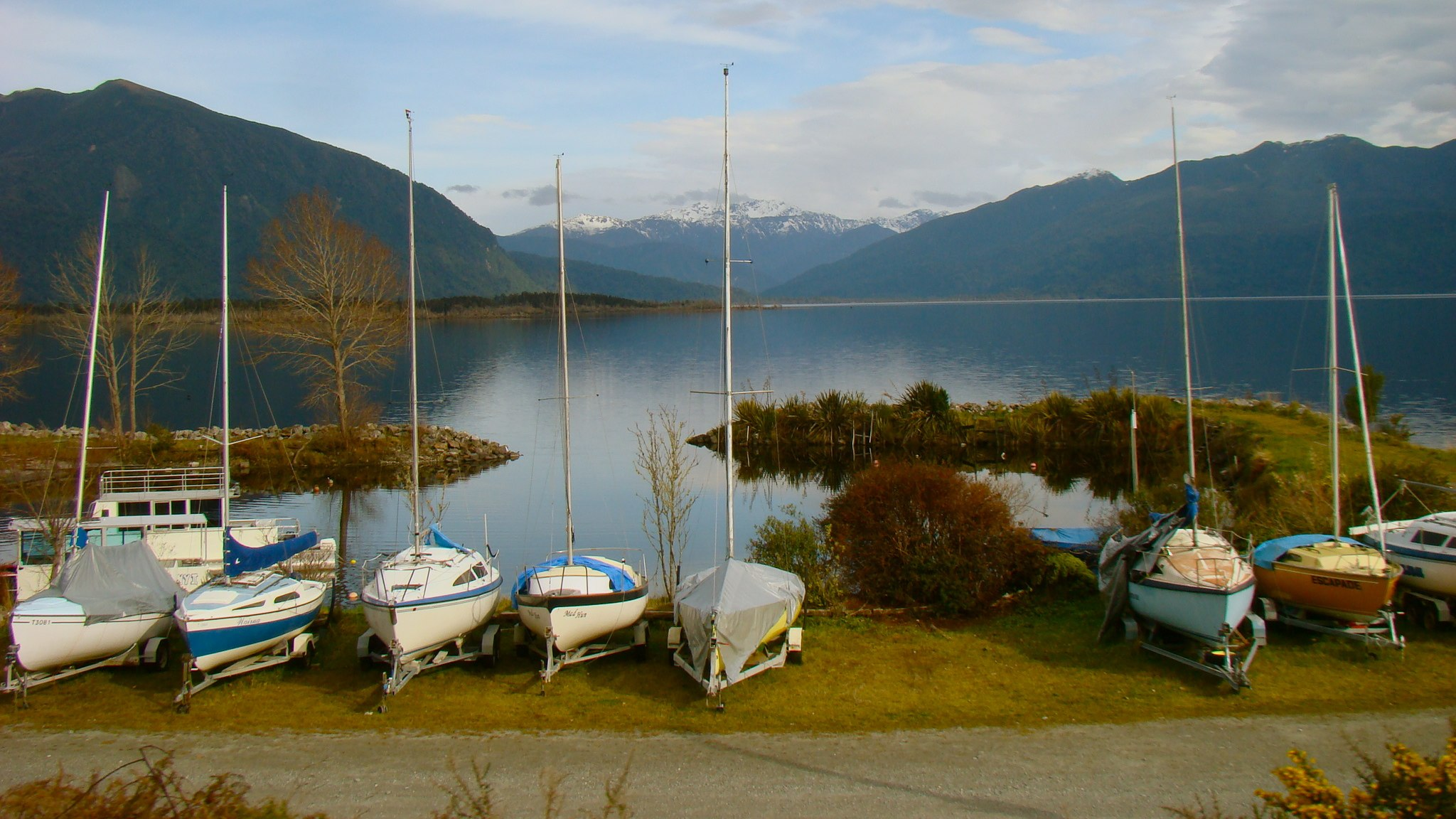
- View of Lake Brunner from Moana
- Interactive map of Moana
- Coordinates: 42°34′32″S 171°28′49″E
- Country: New Zealand
- Region: West Coast
- District: Grey District
- Ward: Eastern
- Electorates: West Coast-Tasman; Te Tai Tonga

Government
  - Territorial Authority: Grey District Council
  - Regional council: West Coast Regional Council
  - Mayor of Grey: Tania Gibson
  - West Coast-Tasman MP: Katie Milne
  - Te Tai Tonga MP: Mananui Ramsden

Area
  - Total: 1.16 km^{2} (0.45 sq mi)

Population (June 2025)
  - Total: 110
  - Density: 95/km^{2} (250/sq mi)
- Local iwi: Ngāi Tahu

Moana is a small town in the West Coast Region of the South Island of New Zealand. It is situated on the northern shore of Lake Brunner, and is beside the outflow of the lake into the Arnold River. There is a pedestrian suspension bridge crossing the Arnold from the town to access the lake shore across the river, with some short easy bush walks on each side.

The town has a permanent population of less than 100, but is a popular location for summer tourism. There are around 300 holiday homes and a camping ground.

The town's main tourist attractions are the panoramic views and water sport opportunities arising from its position on the shores of Lake Brunner. The Midland Line railway passes through Moana; the TranzAlpine tourist passenger train passes through once in each direction daily, and freight trains of coal operate more frequently.

In May 2013, Moana became one of the first places in New Zealand to get 4G wireless broadband.

== Demographics ==
Moana is described by Stats NZ as a rural settlement and covers 1.16 km^{2} (0.45 sq mi). It had an estimated population of 110 as of June 2025, with a population density of 95 people per km^{2}. Moana is part of the larger Lake Brunner statistical area.

Historical population for Moana
Year	Pop.	±% p.a.
2006	63	—
2013	66	+0.67%
2018	57	−2.89%
2023	90	+9.57%
The 2006 population is for a smaller area of 0.58 km^{2}. Source:

Moana had a population of 90 in the 2023 New Zealand census, an increase of 33 people (57.9%) since the 2018 census, and an increase of 24 people (36.4%) since the 2013 census. There were 45 males and 45 females in 42 dwellings. 3.3% of people identified as LGBTIQ+. The median age was 57.2 years (compared with 38.1 years nationally). There were 12 people (13.3%) aged under 15 years, 9 (10.0%) aged 15 to 29, 42 (46.7%) aged 30 to 64, and 24 (26.7%) aged 65 or older.

People could identify as more than one ethnicity. The results were 90.0% European (Pākehā), 10.0% Māori, 3.3% Pasifika, and 3.3% Asian. English was spoken by 96.7%, and Māori by 3.3%. New Zealand Sign Language was known by 3.3%. The percentage of people born overseas was 10.0, compared with 28.8% nationally.

Religious affiliations were 23.3% Christian. People who answered that they had no religion were 63.3%, and 10.0% of people did not answer the census question.

Of those at least 15 years old, 15 (19.2%) people had a bachelor's or higher degree, 48 (61.5%) had a post-high school certificate or diploma, and 21 (26.9%) people exclusively held high school qualifications. The median income was $41,200, compared with $41,500 nationally. 6 people (7.7%) earned over $100,000 compared to 12.1% nationally. The employment status of those at least 15 was 39 (50.0%) full-time and 9 (11.5%) part-time.

== Lake Brunner statistical area ==
Lake Brunner statistical area, which also includes Gloriavale, covers 1,301.70 km^{2} (502.59 sq mi) and had an estimated population of 1,060 as of June 2025, with a population density of 0.81 people per km^{2}.

Historical population for Lake Brunner
Year	Pop.	±% p.a.
2006	753	—
2013	918	+2.87%
2018	1,065	+3.02%
2023	999	−1.27%

Lake Brunner had a population of 999 in the 2023 New Zealand census, a decrease of 66 people (−6.2%) since the 2018 census, and an increase of 81 people (8.8%) since the 2013 census. There were 504 males and 492 females in 210 dwellings. 0.9% of people identified as LGBTIQ+. The median age was 23.6 years (compared with 38.1 years nationally). There were 384 people (38.4%) aged under 15 years, 186 (18.6%) aged 15 to 29, 327 (32.7%) aged 30 to 64, and 105 (10.5%) aged 65 or older.

People could identify as more than one ethnicity. The results were 95.5% European (Pākehā), 6.6% Māori, 0.3% Pasifika, 2.4% Asian, and 1.2% other, which includes people giving their ethnicity as "New Zealander". English was spoken by 95.2%, Māori by 1.5%, and other languages by 2.7%. No language could be spoken by 4.5% (e.g. too young to talk). New Zealand Sign Language was known by 0.6%. The percentage of people born overseas was 7.8, compared with 28.8% nationally.

Religious affiliations were 54.7% Christian, 0.3% Hindu, 0.3% Māori religious beliefs, 0.9% New Age, 0.3% Jewish, and 1.2% other religions. People who answered that they had no religion were 35.7%, and 6.9% of people did not answer the census question.

Of those at least 15 years old, 81 (13.2%) people had a bachelor's or higher degree, 411 (66.8%) had a post-high school certificate or diploma, and 126 (20.5%) people exclusively held high school qualifications. The median income was $27,900, compared with $41,500 nationally. 30 people (4.9%) earned over $100,000 compared to 12.1% nationally. The employment status of those at least 15 was 306 (49.8%) full-time, 78 (12.7%) part-time, and 6 (1.0%) unemployed.

== Education ==
Lake Brunner School is a coeducational full primary (years 1–8) school with a roll of 54 students as of July 2026. It opened in 1959. Rotomanu School closed and merged into this school in 2005.

== Railway station ==
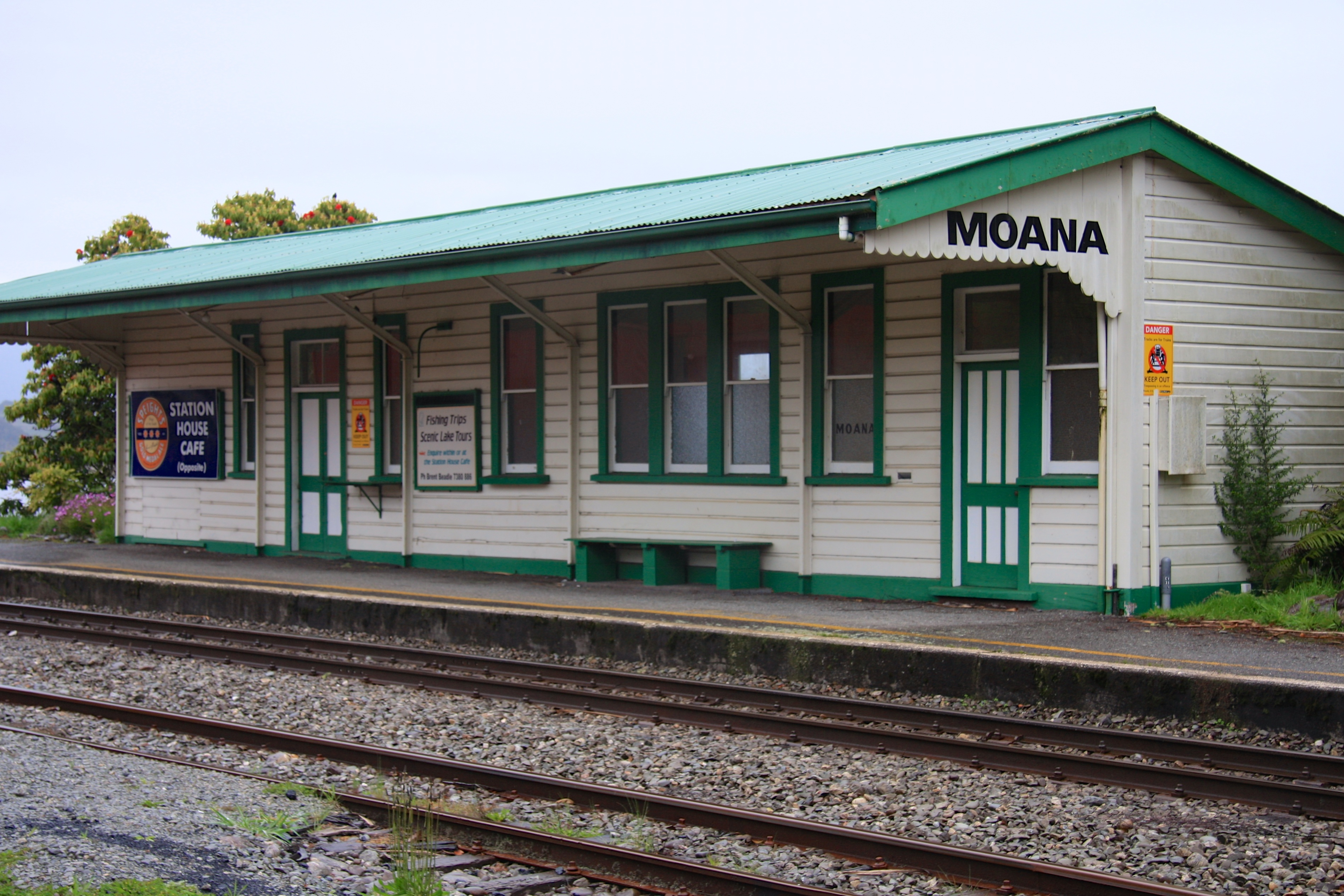
Moana Railway Station

In 1886, the New Zealand Midland Railway Company entered a contract with the Government for the construction of 376 kilometres (234 mi) of railway between Christchurch and Nelson via Brunnerton (later Brunner) over a ten-year period. The line was to be built and operated by private enterprise. In November 1892, the company opened the railway from Brunnerton, but at that stage Moana was only a flag station. By March 1894, the railway had reached Jacksons. However, in 1895 the company collapsed. In May 1895 the Government seized the company's assets on the grounds that the contract had expired with the works incomplete. The Government eventually completed the works under the Railways Construction and Land Act 1881.

The opening of the railway to Moana enabled settlement by Pākeha and establishment of timber mills in the local area. By June 1895 a 140 metres (460 ft) siding was being operated at Moana station by the Lake Brunner Sawmill Company. The date of construction of the original Moana railway station building is not known, but by 1895 the station had a 61 metres (200 ft) long platform and 240 metres (790 ft) siding.

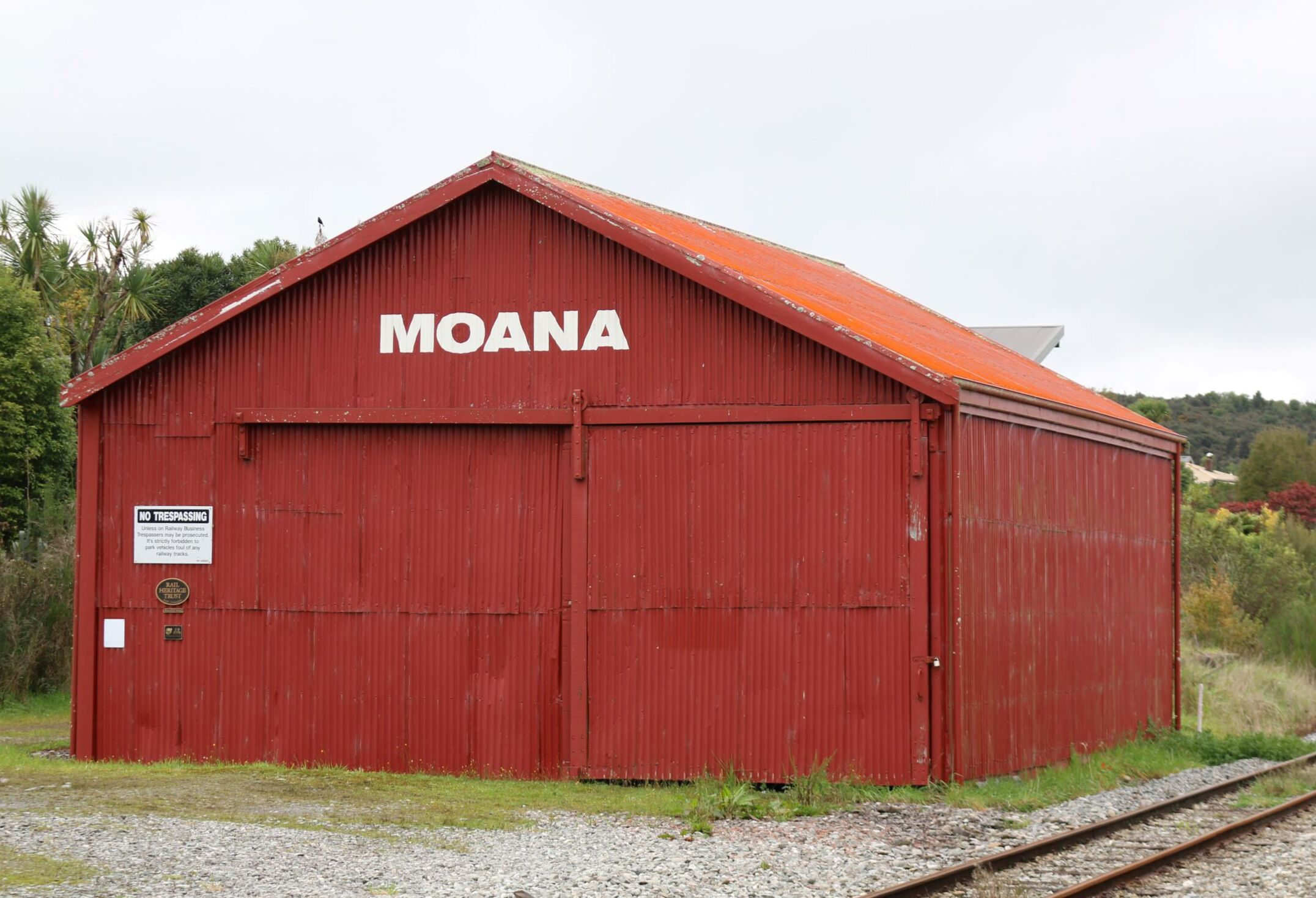
Railway shed in Moana (April 2021)

On 16 April 1926, the station building was destroyed in a fire. A replacement building was constructed in the same year. The replacement was to the standard type A design, from the family of standard railway station designs prepared by Railways architect George Troup.

The Moana Railway Station is listed as a Category 1 Historic Place by Heritage New Zealand. It is the only type A station building still remaining that is complete with its associated sidings and goods sheds. Heritage New Zealand has also given a Category 1 listing to the Moana Railway Station Historic Area comprising the station building, a footbridge, the goods shed and the former station master's house (now used as a cafe).

== See also ==
- Bell Hill mill tramway
