= Paroa, West Coast =

Settlement in the South Island of New Zealand

Paroa
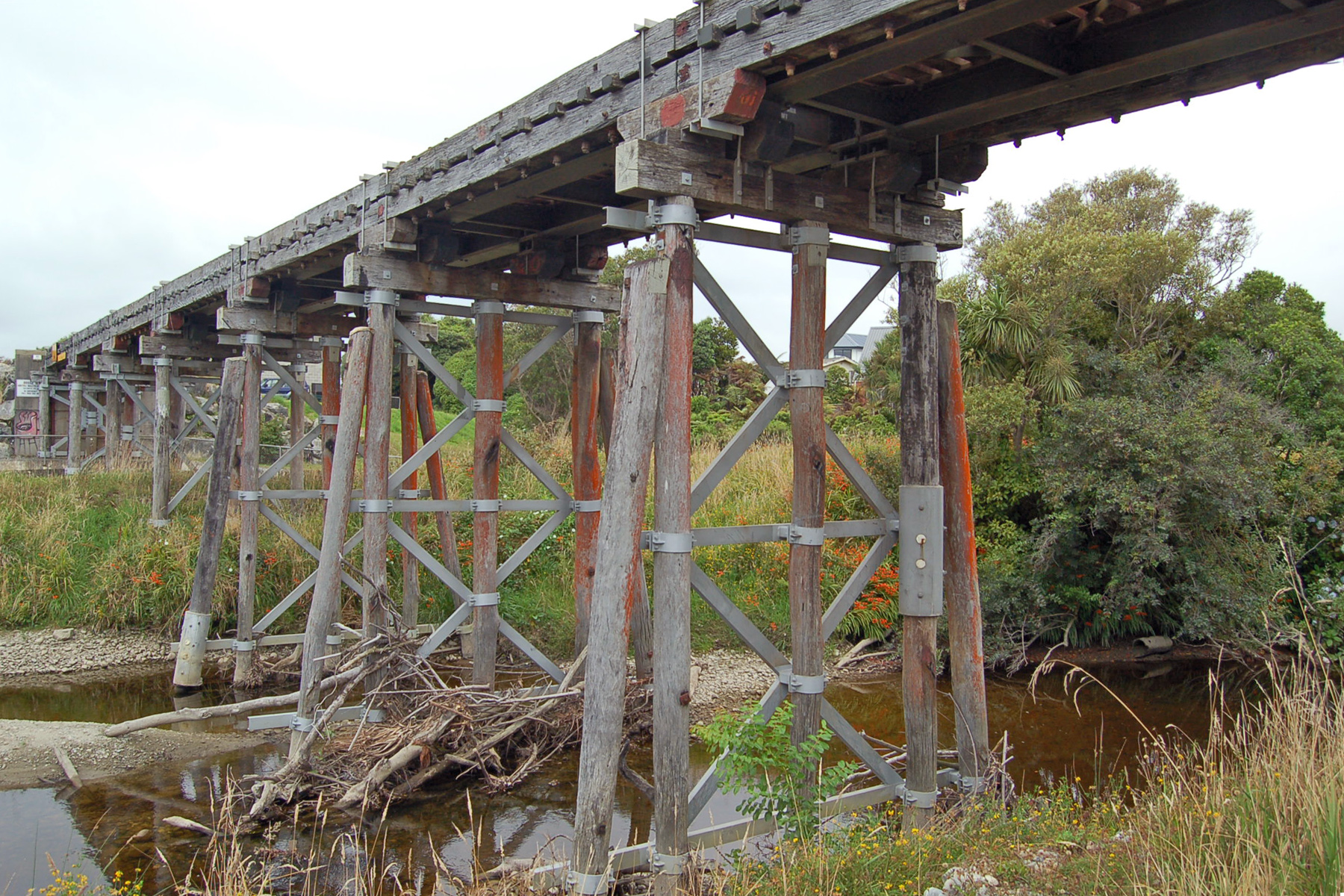
- Paroa Trestle on the old Hokitika Branch line
- Interactive map of Paroa
- Coordinates: 42°30′39″S 171°10′9″E
- Country: New Zealand
- Region: West Coast
- District: Grey District
- Ward: Southern
- Electorates: West Coast-Tasman; Te Tai Tonga

Government
  - Territorial Authority: Grey District Council
  - Regional council: West Coast Regional Council
  - Mayor of Grey: Tania Gibson
  - West Coast-Tasman MP: Maureen Pugh
  - Te Tai Tonga MP: Tākuta Ferris

Area
  - Total: 3.91 km^{2} (1.51 sq mi)

Population (2023 census)
  - Total: 867
  - Density: 222/km^{2} (574/sq mi)
- Local iwi: Ngāi Tahu

Paroa is a settlement on the West Coast of the South Island of New Zealand, just south of Greymouth. State Highway 6 and the Hokitika Branch railway both run through Paroa. This railway was originally a bush tramway that opened to Paroa from Greymouth in 1867 and was extended to Kumara in 1877. It was converted into a railway in 1893, and this time, ran from Paroa to Hokitika rather than Kumara.

The New Zealand Ministry for Culture and Heritage gives a translation of "broad fortified village" for Pāroa.

Shantytown, to the south-east of Paroa, is a recreation of a typical 1880s West Coast gold mining town, built in 1971 and operating as a commercial tourist attraction.

== Demographics ==
Paroa covers 3.91 km^{2} (1.51 sq mi). It is part of the larger Rutherglen-Camerons statistical area.

Historical population for Paroa
Year	Pop.	±% p.a.
2006	585	—
2013	669	+1.94%
2018	765	+2.72%
2023	867	+2.53%

Paroa had a population of 867 in the 2023 New Zealand census, an increase of 102 people (13.3%) since the 2018 census, and an increase of 198 people (29.6%) since the 2013 census. There were 435 males, 435 females, and 3 people of other genders in 327 dwellings. 2.1% of people identified as LGBTIQ+. There were 153 people (17.6%) aged under 15 years, 123 (14.2%) aged 15 to 29, 420 (48.4%) aged 30 to 64, and 168 (19.4%) aged 65 or older.

People could identify as more than one ethnicity. The results were 92.0% European (Pākehā), 8.7% Māori, 1.4% Pasifika, 3.8% Asian, and 5.5% other, which includes people giving their ethnicity as "New Zealander". English was spoken by 98.3%, Māori by 0.7%, and other languages by 4.8%. No language could be spoken by 1.7% (e.g. too young to talk). The percentage of people born overseas was 11.4, compared with 28.8% nationally.

Religious affiliations were 39.1% Christian, 0.3% Hindu, and 0.3% Islam. People who answered that they had no religion were 53.3%, and 6.6% of people did not answer the census question.

Of those at least 15 years old, 105 (14.7%) people had a bachelor's or higher degree, 456 (63.9%) had a post-high school certificate or diploma, and 156 (21.8%) people exclusively held high school qualifications. 105 people (14.7%) earned over $100,000 compared to 12.1% nationally. The employment status of those at least 15 was 408 (57.1%) full-time, 96 (13.4%) part-time, and 3 (0.4%) unemployed.

=== Rutherglen-Camerons statistical area ===
Rutherglen-Camerons statistical area, which also includes Rutherglen, Gladstone and Camerons, covers 12.12 km^{2} (4.68 sq mi). It had an estimated population of 1,510 as of June 2025, with a population density of 125 people per km^{2}.

Historical population
Year	Pop.	±% p.a.
2006	1,071	—
2013	1,197	+1.60%
2018	1,332	+2.16%
2023	1,458	+1.82%

Rutherglen-Camerons had a population of 1,458 in the 2023 New Zealand census, an increase of 126 people (9.5%) since the 2018 census, and an increase of 261 people (21.8%) since the 2013 census. There were 741 males, 714 females, and 3 people of other genders in 567 dwellings. 2.1% of people identified as LGBTIQ+. The median age was 45.7 years (compared with 38.1 years nationally). There were 249 people (17.1%) aged under 15 years, 207 (14.2%) aged 15 to 29, 711 (48.8%) aged 30 to 64, and 291 (20.0%) aged 65 or older.

People could identify as more than one ethnicity. The results were 93.2% European (Pākehā), 9.1% Māori, 1.0% Pasifika, 3.1% Asian, and 4.1% other, which includes people giving their ethnicity as "New Zealander". English was spoken by 98.6%, Māori by 0.8%, and other languages by 4.7%. No language could be spoken by 1.6% (e.g. too young to talk). New Zealand Sign Language was known by 0.2%. The percentage of people born overseas was 11.9, compared with 28.8% nationally.

Religious affiliations were 36.2% Christian, 0.4% Hindu, 0.2% Islam, 0.2% New Age, and 0.4% other religions. People who answered that they had no religion were 55.8%, and 6.8% of people did not answer the census question.

Of those at least 15 years old, 165 (13.6%) people had a bachelor's or higher degree, 768 (63.5%) had a post-high school certificate or diploma, and 279 (23.1%) people exclusively held high school qualifications. The median income was $47,400, compared with $41,500 nationally. 171 people (14.1%) earned over $100,000 compared to 12.1% nationally. The employment status of those at least 15 was 678 (56.1%) full-time, 150 (12.4%) part-time, and 12 (1.0%) unemployed.

== Education ==
Paroa School is a coeducational full primary (years 1–8) school with a roll of 172. The school originally accepted year 1–6 pupils only, but changed to include year 7 and 8 students in 2001. It opened in 1876.

== Climate ==
Climate data for Paroa
Month	Jan	Feb	Mar	Apr	May	Jun	Jul	Aug	Sep	Oct	Nov	Dec	Year
Average precipitation mm (inches)	222 (8.7)	149 (5.9)	210 (8.3)	237 (9.3)	237 (9.3)	203 (8.0)	211 (8.3)	209 (8.2)	236 (9.3)	248 (9.8)	241 (9.5)	234 (9.2)	2,637 (103.8)
Source: The Weather Network
