= Greymouth Central =

Central business district of Greymouth, New Zealand

- Suburb
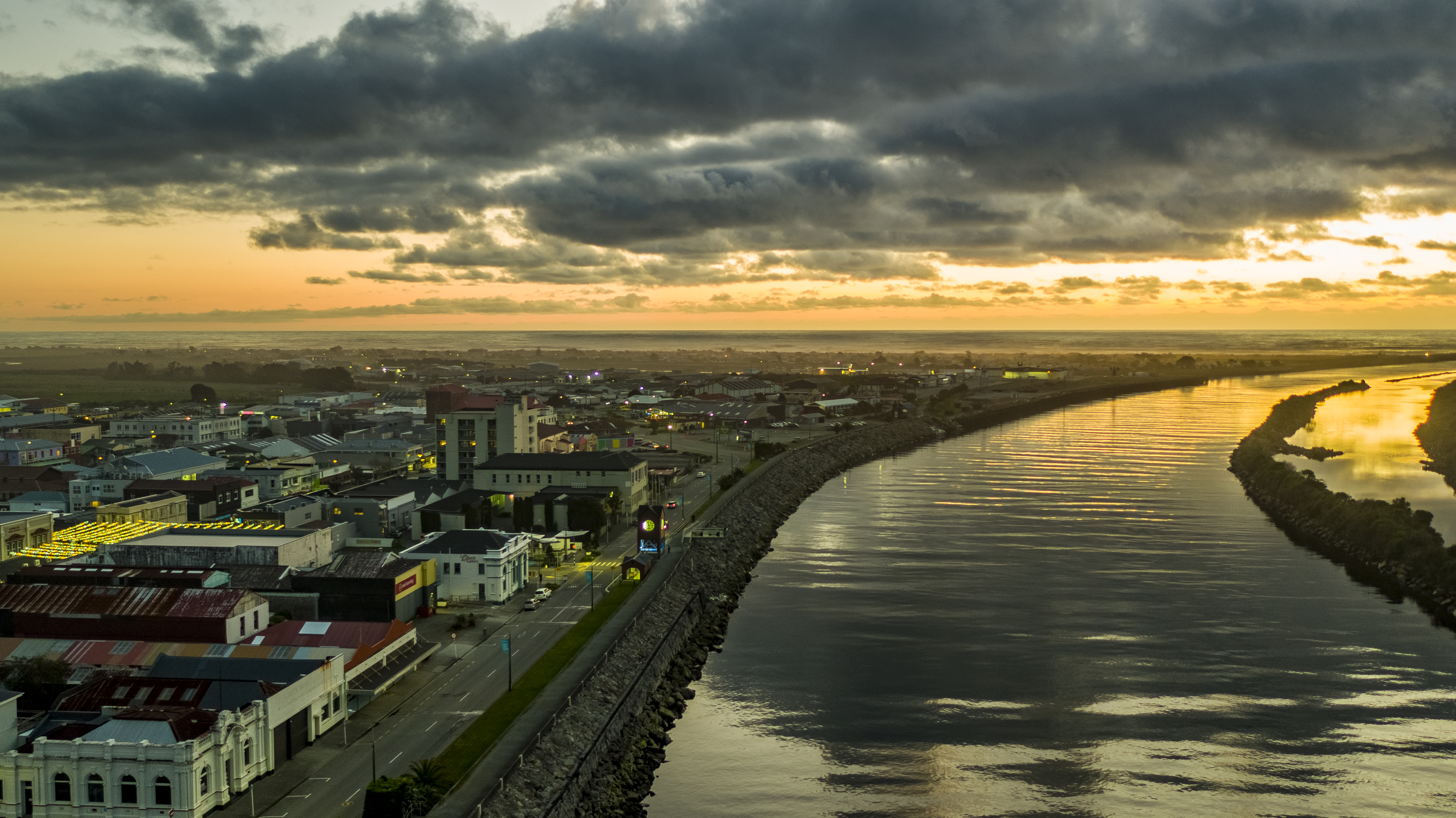
- Greymouth viewed from the north-east
- Interactive map of Greymouth Central
- Coordinates: 42.460°S 171.201°E
- Country: New Zealand
- City: Greymouth
- Local authority: Grey District Council
- Electoral ward: Central

Area
  - Land: 348 ha (860 acres)

Population (June 2025)
  - Total: 2,130
  - Density: 612/km^{2} (1,590/sq mi)
- Airports: Greymouth Airport
- Hospitals: Te Nikau Grey Hospital and Health Centre

Blaketown	Cobden
(Tasman Sea)	Greymouth Central
	Karoro	Wharemoa

Greymouth Central is the central business district of Greymouth on the West Coast of New Zealand, which also contains residential housing.

The earliest street names honour pioneer residents, explorers and prominent local Māori, while others pay tribute to English literary figures and politicians. Later developments recognise the achievements of local residents who contributed significantly to civic and local body affairs.

== Demographics ==
Greymouth Central covers 3.48 km^{2} (1.34 sq mi) and had an estimated population of 2,130 as of June 2025, with a population density of 612 people per km^{2}.

Historical population
Year	Pop.	±% p.a.
2006	2,400	—
2013	2,136	−1.65%
2018	2,031	−1.00%
2023	2,076	+0.44%

Greymouth Central had a population of 2,076 in the 2023 New Zealand census, an increase of 45 people (2.2%) since the 2018 census, and a decrease of 60 people (−2.8%) since the 2013 census. There were 966 males, 1,101 females, and 12 people of other genders in 909 dwellings. 3.5% of people identified as LGBTIQ+. There were 291 people (14.0%) aged under 15 years, 306 (14.7%) aged 15 to 29, 861 (41.5%) aged 30 to 64, and 615 (29.6%) aged 65 or older.

People could identify as more than one ethnicity. The results were 84.4% European (Pākehā); 12.4% Māori; 2.5% Pasifika; 9.0% Asian; 0.4% Middle Eastern, Latin American and African New Zealanders (MELAA); and 2.9% other, which includes people giving their ethnicity as "New Zealander". English was spoken by 97.7%, Māori by 2.5%, Samoan by 0.3%, and other languages by 7.9%. No language could be spoken by 1.6% (e.g. too young to talk). New Zealand Sign Language was known by 0.6%. The percentage of people born overseas was 17.2, compared with 28.8% nationally.

Religious affiliations were 38.9% Christian, 1.9% Hindu, 0.6% Islam, 0.3% Māori religious beliefs, 0.4% Buddhist, 0.6% New Age, and 1.4% other religions. People who answered that they had no religion were 48.1%, and 7.8% of people did not answer the census question.

Of those at least 15 years old, 276 (15.5%) people had a bachelor's or higher degree, 966 (54.1%) had a post-high school certificate or diploma, and 540 (30.3%) people exclusively held high school qualifications. 108 people (6.1%) earned over $100,000 compared to 12.1% nationally. The employment status of those at least 15 was 735 (41.2%) full-time, 237 (13.3%) part-time, and 39 (2.2%) unemployed.

Individual statistical areas
Name	Area (km^{2})	Population	Density (per km^{2})	Dwellings	Median age	Median income
Greymouth Central	2.64	999	378	429	54.7 years	$29,800
King Park	0.84	1,077	1,282	480	46.0 years	$29,600
New Zealand					38.1 years	$41,500

== Education ==
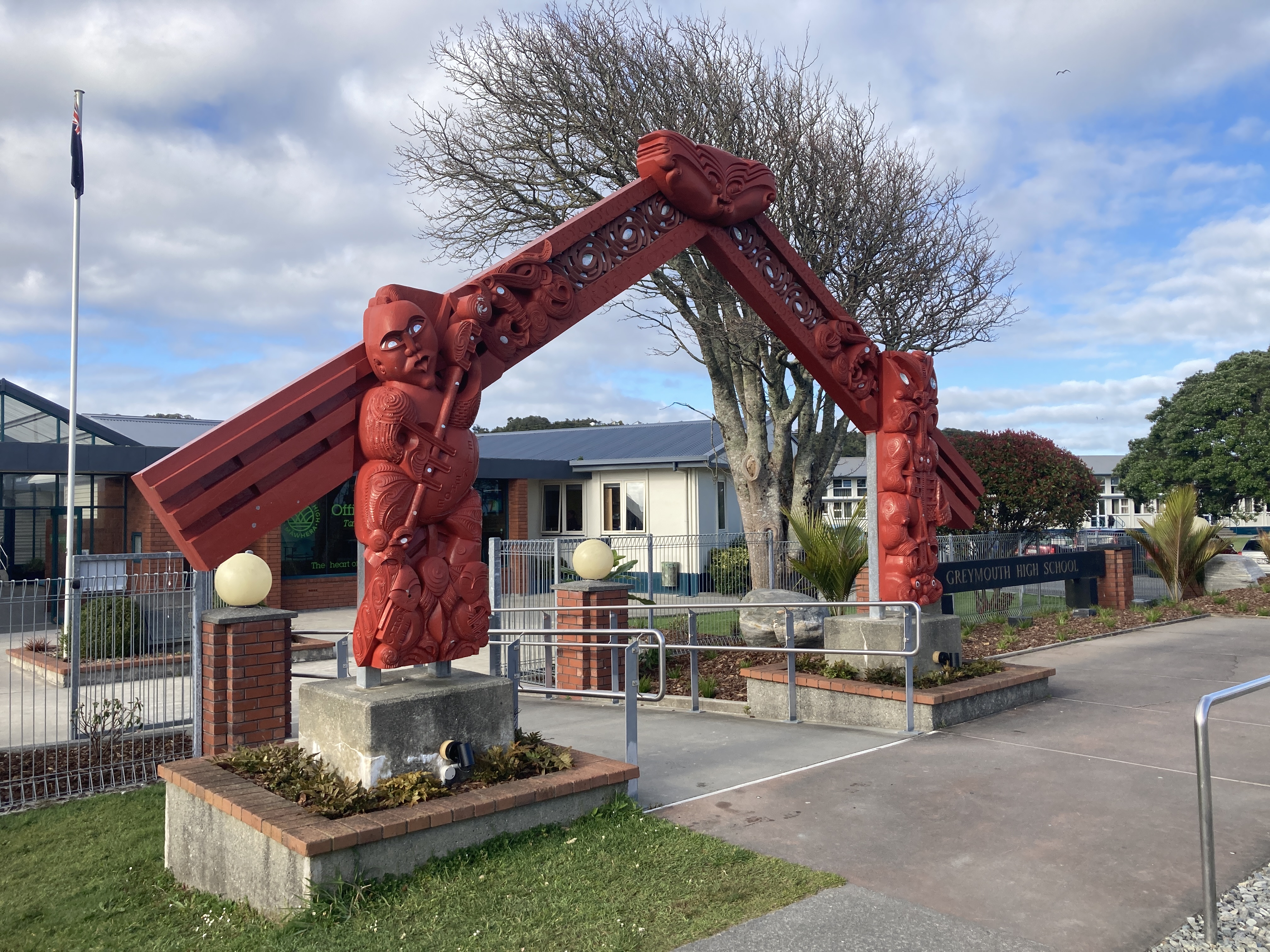
Greymouth High School

There are four schools in the central Greymouth area, and other schools in the suburbs or adjoining areas of Blaketown, Cobden and Karoro.

Greymouth High School is a secondary (years 9–13) school with a roll of 554. It opened as Greymouth Technical High School in 1923, an amalgamation of the secondary department of Greymouth District High School with some technical classes.

Greymouth Main School is a full primary (years 1–8) school with a roll of 181. It opened in 1876 in Guinness Street, moved to Tainui Street in 1915, and to its current site at Joyce Crescent in 1974. It was Greymouth District High School from 1885 or earlier until the formation of Greymouth Technical High School in 1923.

John Paul II High School is a secondary (years 9–13) school with a roll of 195. The school was formed in 1980 from the merger of Marist Brothers Boys’ School and St Mary’s High School.

St Patrick's School is a full primary (years 1–8) school with a roll of 212. Both are state integrated Catholic schools. The schools are adjacent to each other and have a shared Board of Trustees. It opened in 1866 and moved to its current location in 1985.

All these schools are co-educational. Rolls are as of March 2026.

There is also a tertiary provider. Tai Poutini Polytechnic has its head office based in Greymouth. It also has campuses in Auckland, Christchurch, Hokitika, Reefton, Wanaka and Westport.
