= John Ryall =

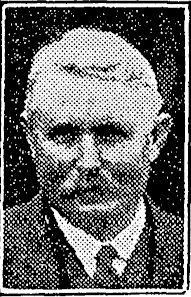
John Ryall in 1929

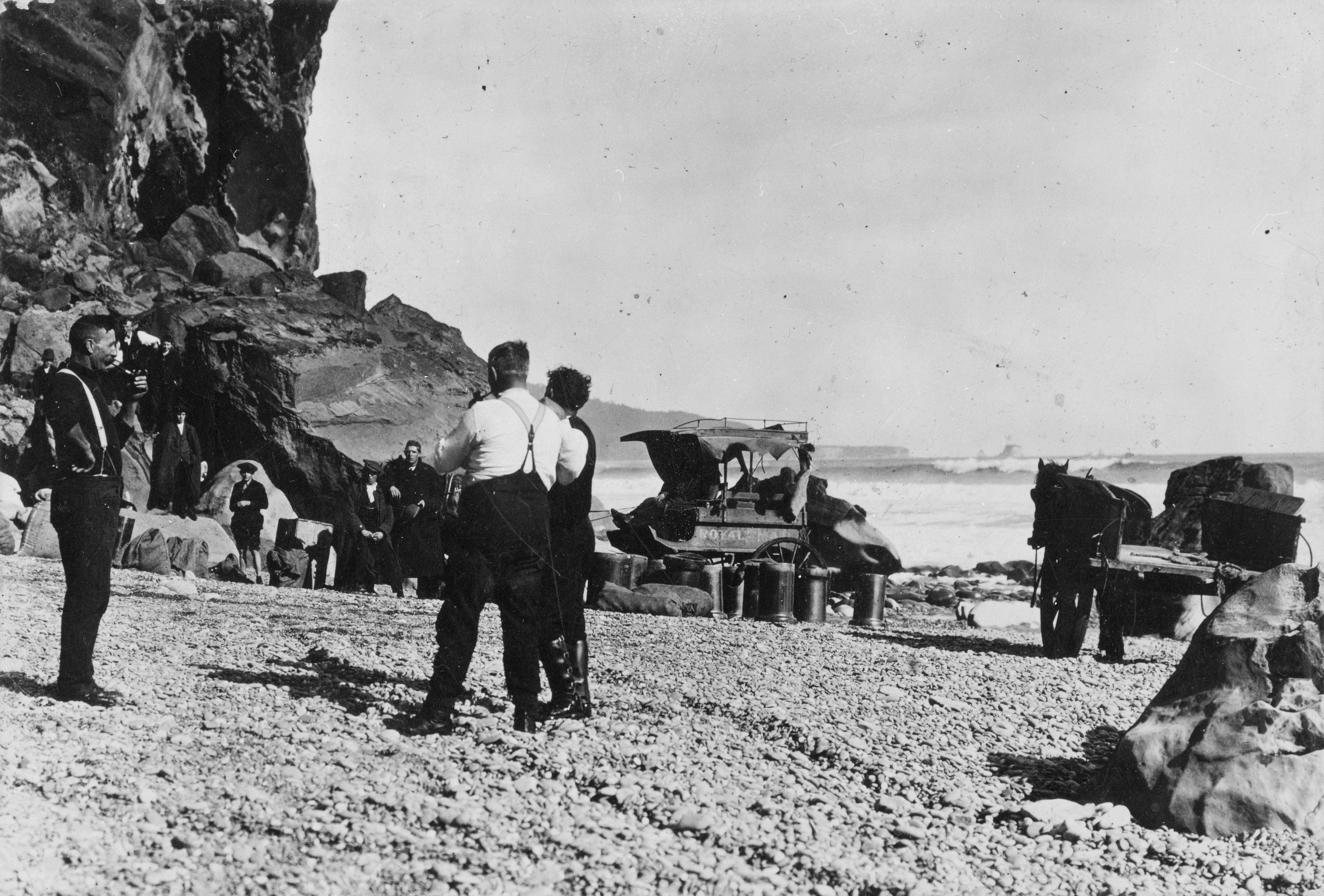
Ryall's mail coach and wagon on Barrytown beach in 1914

John Joseph Ryall (25 January 1875 – 26 May 1953) was a member of the New Zealand Legislative Council from 1940 until its abolition in 1950. He succeeded his father as councillor for the Cobden Riding of the Grey County Council in 1904 and remained a member until his death, always returned unopposed. He was chairman of the Grey County on eight occasions.

== Biography ==
Ryall was born in 1875, the son of Denis Ryall of Barrytown. His father was a storekeeper and a member of the Grey County Council, including its chairman. Ryall took over his father's business in 1897, and also ran the local branch of the Bank of New Zealand and was postmaster. On 19 July 1902, Ryall married Alice Prendergast at St Patrick's Church in Greymouth.

Denis Ryall's death in September 1904 caused a by-election in the Cobden of the Grey County Council. Joseph Taylor and John Ryall were nominated, but Taylor withdrew and Ryall was declared elected unopposed. Until his death nearly 50 years later, Ryall stood at every subsequent election for the Cobden Riding and was returned unopposed every time. He was chairman of the Grey County Council in 1911, 1916, 1927, 1931, 1936, 1939, 1945, and 1953, when he died. He was a member of the Greymouth Harbour Board for many years, including its chairman. He was a member of the New Zealand Legislative Council from 15 July 1940 to 14 July 1947, and from 15 July 1947 to 31 December 1950. He was appointed by the First Labour Government.

Ryall operated a coach service before the Greymouth-Westport Coastal Highway was built; he was a strong proponent of the construction of the road. Once the highway had been constructed, he operated a bus service to Greymouth. The road is now part of State Highway 6. Ryall's hobby was horse racing, and betting on horses.

Ryall died on 26 May 1953 at Lewisham Hospital in Christchurch. A 1998 portrait of John Ryall in The Coaster states that Mount Ryall (1,220 metres or 4,000 feet) inland from Barrytown is named for him, but Reed's Place Names of New Zealand attributes the name to his father. The Croesus Track that starts in Barrytown traverses the peak.
