= Bell Hill mill tramway =

Coordinates: 42.557753°S 171.546746°E

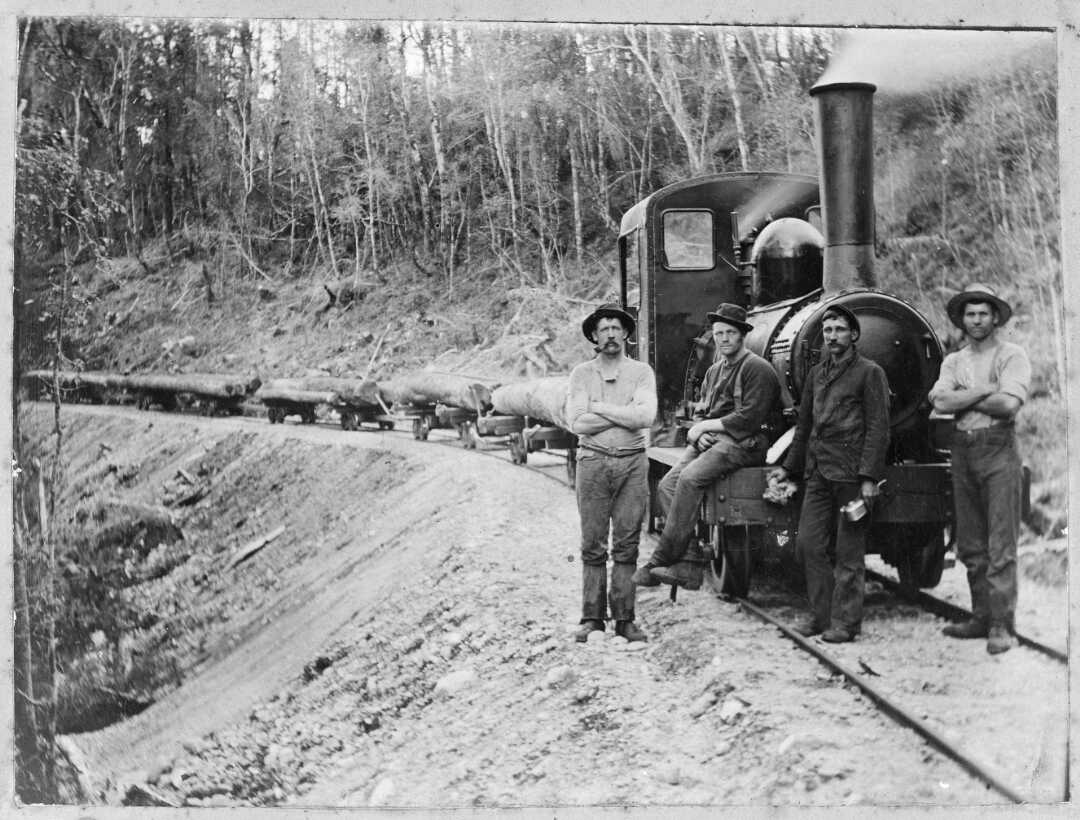
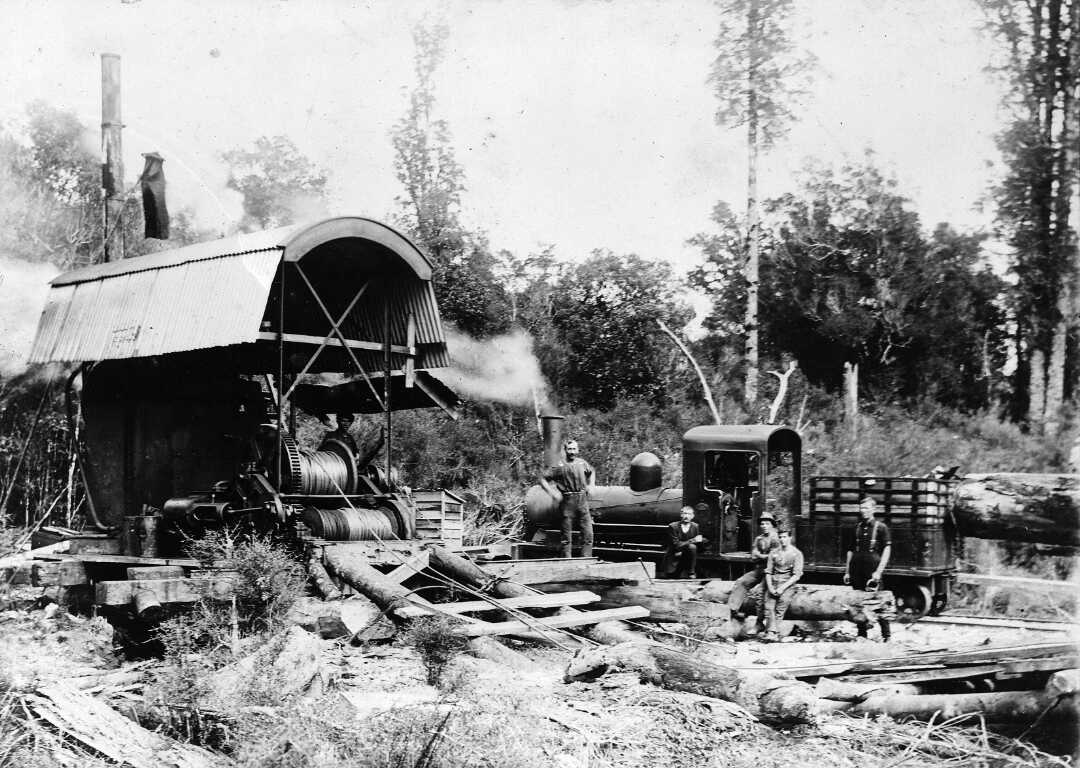
- Johnson steam locomotive of Bell Hill mill tramway Nyberg steam hauler, locomotive and workers

Technical
- Track gauge: 3 ft 6 in (1,067 mm)

Bell Hill mill tramway was a bush tramway at Bell Hill in the Moana Region of the Grey District on the West Coast of New Zealand. The tramway with a track gauge of 3 ft 6 in (1,067 mm) was used in the 1910s.

== History ==
The Bell Hill mill was owned by Brownlee and Company and opened in the second decade of the 20th century. At times the mill closed down due to lack of water for the mill's boilers and for dampening down sawdust. In 1947 the mill was threatened by fire.

== Locomotives ==
The Johnson locomotive was built in Invercargill in 1906.

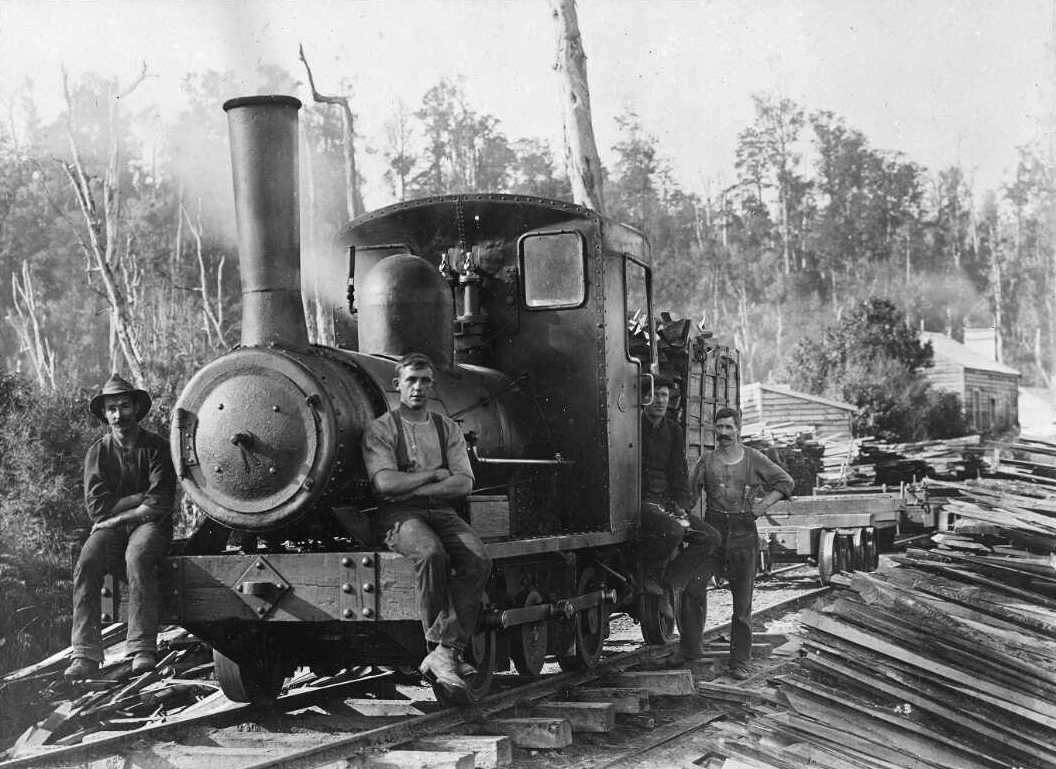
Timber mill workers on a 0-6-0 Johnson loco, Bell Hill mill, ca 1910

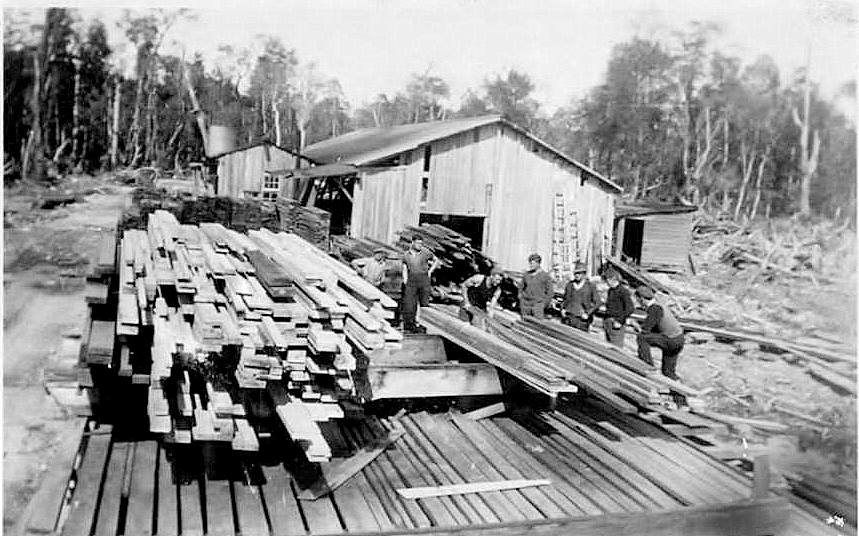
A sawmill at Bell Hill, possibly Jack Bros' Sawmill

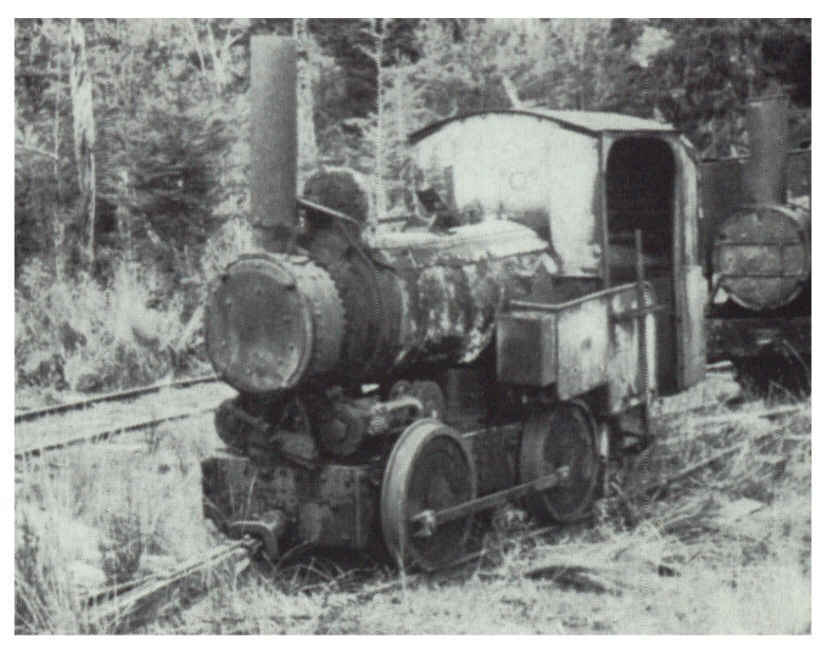
Abandoned 0-4-0T Gibbons & Harris loco No 3 at Bell Hill

== Further literature ==
- Daniel Reese: Was It All Cricket? George Allen and Unwin Ltd, 1948, London.
