= James Goodall =

New Zealand politician

Member of the New Zealand Legislative Council
- In office 9 March 1936 – 22 September 1942

Personal details
- Born: 1862 Nelson, New Zealand
- Died: 22 September 1942 (aged 79–80) Greymouth, New Zealand
- Resting place: Karoro Cemetery, Greymouth
- Occupation: Politician

James Goodall (1862 – 22 September 1942) was a member of the New Zealand Legislative Council from 9 March 1936 to 22 September 1942, when he died. He was appointed by the First Labour Government.

Goodall was born in Nelson in 1862. His parents were Edward Goodall (born in New South Wales) and Sarah (nee Kidson) from Nelson. The Goodall moved to Greymouth in 1867.

Goodall died suddenly on 22 September 1942 at Greymouth. He was buried at Karoro Cemetery.
