= Blaketown =

Suburb of Greymouth, New Zealand

Coordinates: 42°26′56″S 171°11′45″E

- Suburb
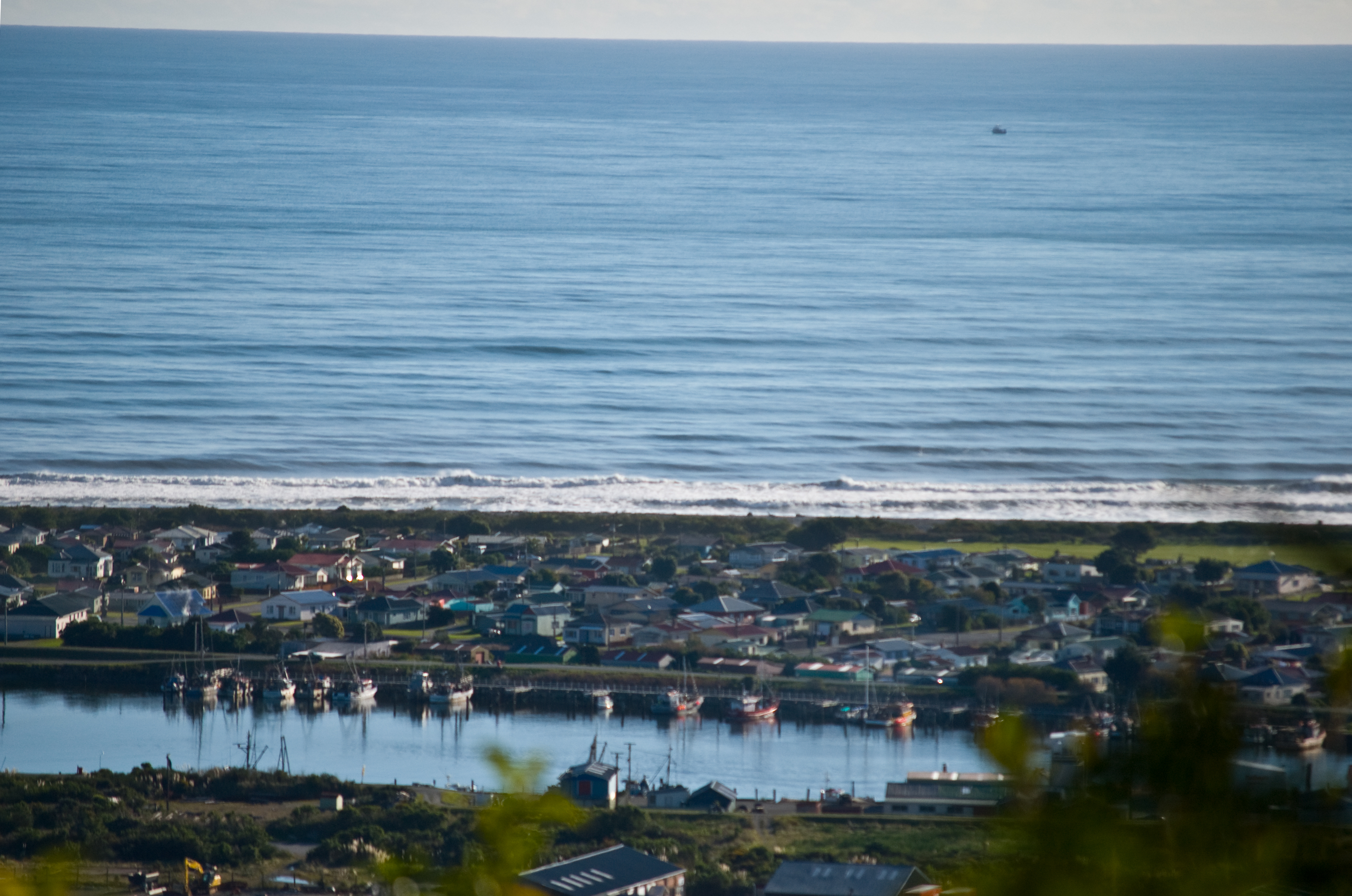
- Interactive map of Blaketown
- Country: New Zealand
- City: Greymouth
- Local authority: Grey District Council
- Electoral ward: Central

Area
  - Land: 69 ha (170 acres)

Population (June 2025)
  - Total: 880
  - Density: 1,300/km^{2} (3,300/sq mi)

		Cobden
(Tasman Sea)	Blaketown	Greymouth Central
	Karoro

Blaketown is a suburb to the west of Greymouth on the West Coast of New Zealand. The Grey River separates Blaketown from Cobden, and the Blaketown Lagoon separates it from the centre of Greymouth.

The town is named after Isaac Blake, an early storekeeper in the district.

== Demographics ==
Blaketown covers 0.69 km^{2} (0.27 sq mi) and had an estimated population of 880 as of June 2025, with a population density of 1,275 people per km^{2}.

Historical population
Year	Pop.	±% p.a.
2006	864	—
2013	840	−0.40%
2018	810	−0.72%
2023	864	+1.30%

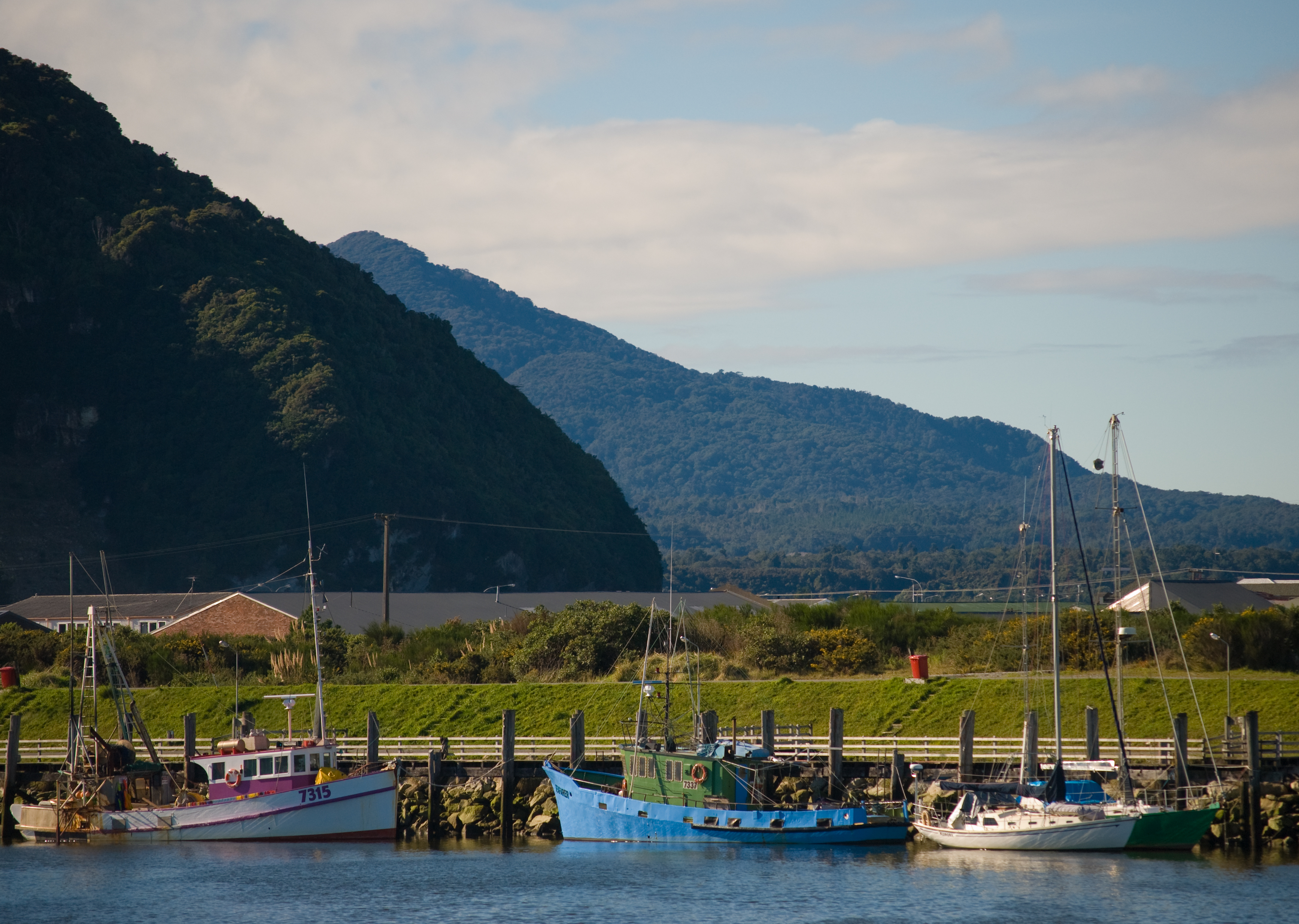
Blaketown Lagoon

Blaketown had a population of 864 in the 2023 New Zealand census, an increase of 54 people (6.7%) since the 2018 census, and an increase of 24 people (2.9%) since the 2013 census. There were 435 males, 420 females, and 6 people of other genders in 384 dwellings. 3.8% of people identified as LGBTIQ+. The median age was 42.0 years (compared with 38.1 years nationally). There were 135 people (15.6%) aged under 15 years, 153 (17.7%) aged 15 to 29, 408 (47.2%) aged 30 to 64, and 168 (19.4%) aged 65 or older.

People could identify as more than one ethnicity. The results were 89.6% European (Pākehā); 14.9% Māori; 2.1% Pasifika; 5.6% Asian; 0.3% Middle Eastern, Latin American and African New Zealanders (MELAA); and 3.5% other, which includes people giving their ethnicity as "New Zealander". English was spoken by 97.6%, Māori by 3.5%, Samoan by 0.3%, and other languages by 4.2%. No language could be spoken by 2.1% (e.g. too young to talk). New Zealand Sign Language was known by 0.3%. The percentage of people born overseas was 12.2, compared with 28.8% nationally.

Religious affiliations were 26.0% Christian, 1.0% Hindu, 0.3% Māori religious beliefs, 0.7% Buddhist, 0.3% New Age, and 1.4% other religions. People who answered that they had no religion were 63.9%, and 6.2% of people did not answer the census question.

Of those at least 15 years old, 72 (9.9%) people had a bachelor's or higher degree, 396 (54.3%) had a post-high school certificate or diploma, and 258 (35.4%) people exclusively held high school qualifications. The median income was $33,500, compared with $41,500 nationally. 33 people (4.5%) earned over $100,000 compared to 12.1% nationally. The employment status of those at least 15 was 336 (46.1%) full-time, 123 (16.9%) part-time, and 21 (2.9%) unemployed.

== Education ==
Blaketown School is a coeducational full primary (years 1–8) school with a roll of 87 students as of March 2026. It opened in 1909.
