= Barry Dallas =

New Zealand politician

Barry Dallas OBE JP

32nd Mayor of Greymouth
- In office 1965–1968
- Preceded by: Fred Baillie
- Succeeded by: Ossie Jackson
- In office 1980–1989
- Preceded by: Ossie Jackson

1st Mayor of Grey District
- In office 1989–1991
- Succeeded by: Ron Hibbs

Personal details
- Born: Barry Mitchell Dallas; 1 December 1926; Masterton, New Zealand
- Died: 21 April 1992 (aged 65); Greymouth, New Zealand
- Occupation: Medical doctor, chairman of Greymouth Hospital Board

Barry Mitchell Dallas OBE JP (1 December 1926 – 21 April 1992) was a New Zealand politician and doctor. He was twice mayor of Greymouth on the West Coast of New Zealand.

== Biography ==
Dallas was born in Masterton and attended Wairarapa College. He qualified as a doctor at the Otago School of Medicine (1950; MB, ChB) and at the Auckland School of Medicine (1960, DipObs). He was a house surgeon at New Plymouth, and then at Greymouth where he became both surgeon and a general practitioner.

He was on the West Coast Hospital Board from 1970, then the Area Health Board. He was Mayor of Greymouth from 1966 to 1968, and later from 1980 until his unexpected death after a long illness in 1992. Greymouth was regularly flooded by the Grey River. Since the 1860s, the town had been under water almost two dozen times. When the town was flooded twice in 1988, Dallas embarked on an ambitious project to build a flood protection wall. Since its completion, flooding has not occurred again. Dallas was appointed an Officer of the Order of the British Empire, for services to local government and the community, in the 1990 New Year Honours, and was also awarded the New Zealand 1990 Commemoration Medal.

Dallas stood as an independent candidate for the Westland electorate in 1969; and in 1972 and 1975 for the replacement West Coast electorate. He finished second behind the incumbent Paddy Blanchfield in all three elections; standing as an independent candidate in 1972, and as the National candidate in 1975. In 1969 he trailed Blanchfield by only 1879 votes. In 1972 the majority for Blanchfield was 4242, and in 1975 it was 2401.
