= Cobden, New Zealand =

Suburb of Greymouth, New Zealand

Coordinates: 42.4388°S 171.2094°E

Cobden
- Suburb
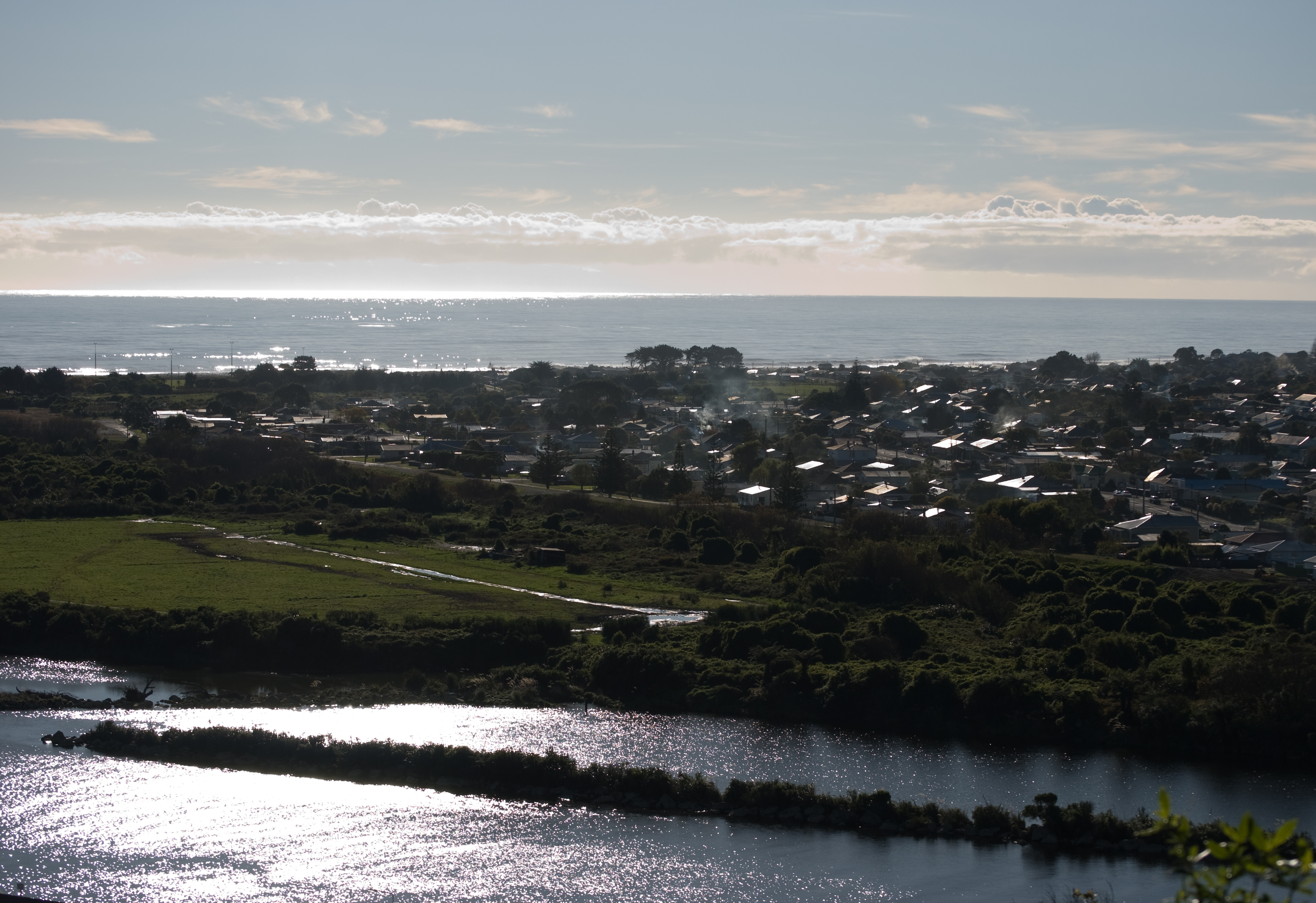
- Interactive map of Cobden
- Country: New Zealand
- City: Greymouth
- Local authority: Grey District Council
- Electoral ward: Central

Area
  - Land: 368 ha (910 acres)

Population (June 2025)
  - Total: 1,660
  - Density: 451/km^{2} (1,170/sq mi)

		Runanga
(Tasman Sea)	Cobden
Blaketown	Greymouth Central

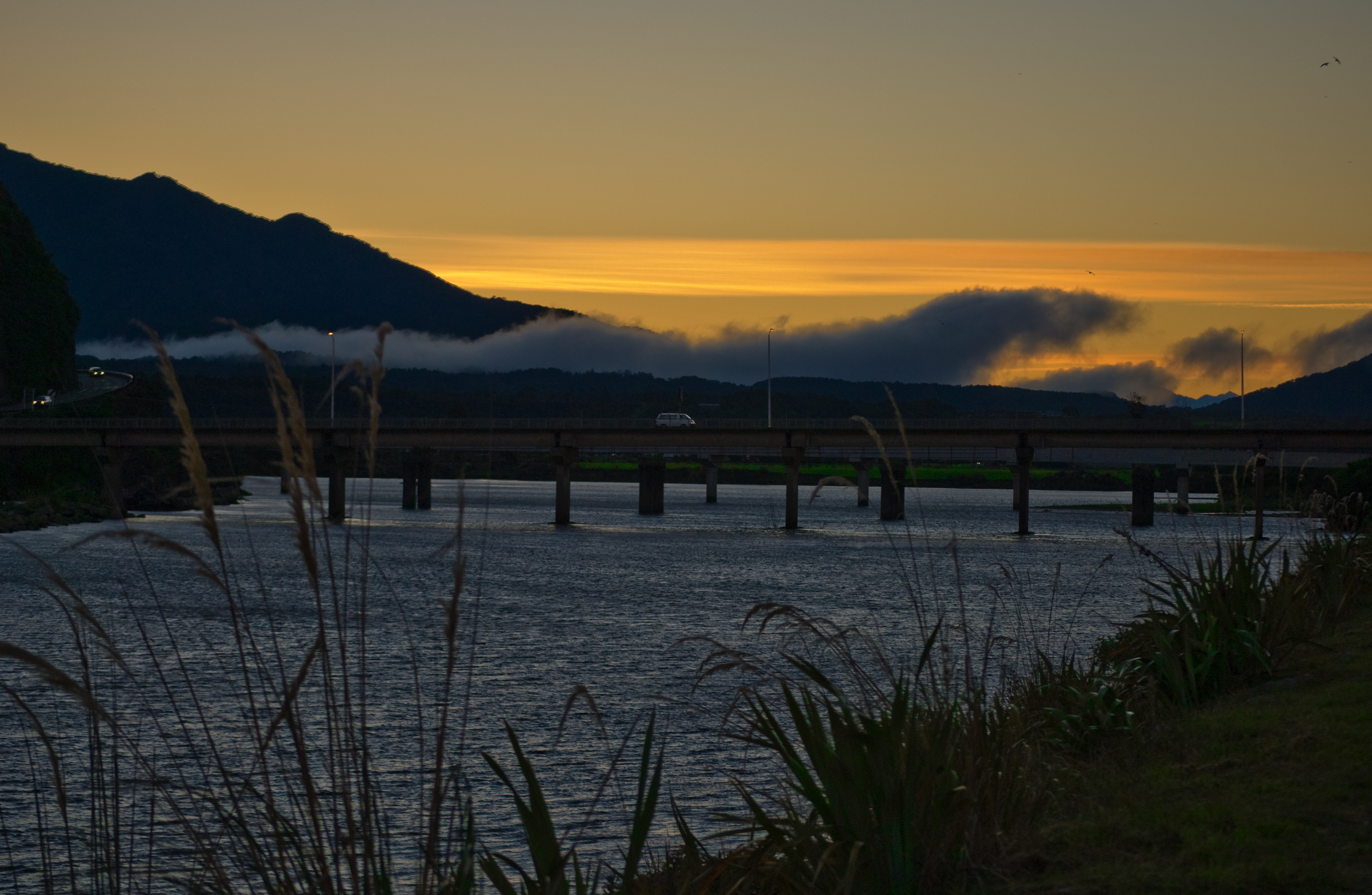
Bridge between Cobden and Greymouth centre

Cobden is a suburb to the north of Greymouth on the West Coast of New Zealand. The Grey River separates Cobden from the rest of Greymouth. To the north is the Rapahoe Range, also called the Twelve Apostles Range. State Highway 6 skirts the south-eastern edge of Cobden.

During the period, 1853 to 1876, Cobden was administrated as part of the Nelson Province.

== History ==
=== Early history ===
An early European explorer, Arthur Dudley Dobson, observed Māori on the north side of the Grey River had a good sized Pa, about where the Cobden quarry is located. The Maoris had a few huts which were the remains of a fair-sized village, once inhabited by a much larger population.

The French navigator Jules Dumont d'Urville, sailed along the West Coast of the South Island in 1827 in the warship, Astrolabe and made reference to the prominent, pyramid shaped limestone outcrops at the base of the Rapahoe Range known locally as the 'Twelve Apostles'.

Thomas Brunner and Charles Heaphy left Nelson in 1846 to explore the West Coast and arrived at the Twelve Mile just north of Rapahoe in a weary state where they were fortunate to meet a group of friendly Māori who supplied them with food and shelter. A party of Māori accompanied them along the beach and across 'Matangitawau Point' (Point Elizabeth) and onto Māwhera River (later named the Grey River) which they couldn't cross for several days due to flooding. Although they gave an unfavourable report of the area on their return to Nelson, only a few years passed before authorities became interested in the small settlement on the north side of the river.

After James Mackay completed the sale of the West Coast with the Māori Chiefs in 1860, his mission was then to return to Nelson. Even though the Grey River was in mild flood, he and his companions tried to reach the north bank by canoe so they could continue their journey north. However their canoe capsized and was swept out to sea. The party managed to reach the north bank and some days later their canoe was washed up on the north beach.

The Grey River became the southern boundary of the Nelson Provincial Government. The Superintendent of the time, Alfred Saunders, considered it time to see the potential of this region for himself. Initially he despatched two Wardens, John Blackett and H.W. Barnicoat by sea to inspect the area and report back to him. But then Saunders departed for the area himself, leading a party overland. Both parties arrived at the Grey River about the same time and after inspecting the area and checking the people already in residence, Superintendent Saunders decided it should be given a name. Saunders was a keen follower of English politics and decided he would give the name of 'Cobden' to this place, honouring Richard Cobden.

== Cobden Bridge ==
The only way to cross the Grey River between the 1860s to the 1880s was either by boat or the public punt which adjusted its timetable depending on river levels and tides. At a public meeting held at the Greymouth Town Hall in June 1883, it was decided to proceed with the building of a bridge and finally end 20 years of dangerous and unsatisfactory crossing of the river.

=== The first bridge ===
In February 1884 tenders were called and the lowest price of £15,000 was accepted from Mr J. M. Watson of Dunedin. The bridge was designed of kauri timber of 6 spans, 109 feet each in length and founded on 5 pairs of cast iron cylinders 53 feet long being 6 feet in diameter at the top and 8 feet at the bottom. These cylinders were filled with concrete.

The kauri was milled in the North Auckland Forests and shipped down from Kaipara by barque and across the Grey bar. The cast iron cylinders were sunk by the compressed air method whereby air was supplied by a huge compressor which delivered all the air necessary to the workmen in their iron wells by means of a strong leather hose, such as firemen use.

The bridge faced serious setbacks in 1885 when two major floods damaged and destroyed the last two cylinders on the Cobden side. However the bridge was finally completed and opened in February 1886. The final cost of the bridge was £18,000 with the Local Authorities contributing £4,500.

=== The second bridge ===
By 1916 the kauri superstructure was showing signs of deterioration and in March 1916 a contract was accepted for its replacement in Australian hardwood from Mr H. Bignall of Greymouth, costing £14,320. This construction was completed in 1920 and boasted a footway capable of having two perambulators pass.

=== The new bridge ===
In 1960 the Road Safety Council made application for a new bridge because of the long delays to traffic. By 1965 traffic counts were showing 4,000 vehicles per day, and this figure was to double over the next 10 years.

Construction commenced in October 1973. Foundations were constructed by building a causeway of gravel out across the river, then sinking large steel cylinders into it to allow the water level to be lowered, while steel H piles up to 85 feet long were driven to the basement limestone. Three piers in the main channel, where the limestone is up to 160 feet below the river bed, were founded on 66 foot long prestressed concrete piles. Fifty five precast prestressed concrete I beams, each weighing 25 tons, were manufactured locally and lifted by crane to span from pier to pier. Hydraulic shock absorbers were incorporated throughout to accommodate earthquake resistance.

During construction, two major floods caused some serious delays, with damage mainly to the temporary causeway. Once completed the bridge measured 910 feet in 11 spans with a total cost of $1.22 million. It was opened on Saturday 9 August 1975 by the Hon. Michael Aynsley Connelly, MP Minister of Works and Development and Chairman of the National Roads Board.

== Demographics ==
Cobden covers 3.68 km^{2} (1.42 sq mi) and had an estimated population of 1,660 as of June 2025, with a population density of 451 people per km^{2}.

Historical population
Year	Pop.	±% p.a.
2006	1,710	—
2013	1,653	−0.48%
2018	1,551	−1.27%
2023	1,593	+0.54%

Cobden had a population of 1,593 in the 2023 New Zealand census, an increase of 42 people (2.7%) since the 2018 census, and a decrease of 60 people (−3.6%) since the 2013 census. There were 834 males, 753 females, and 9 people of other genders in 696 dwellings. 4.0% of people identified as LGBTIQ+. The median age was 41.2 years (compared with 38.1 years nationally). There were 267 people (16.8%) aged under 15 years, 291 (18.3%) aged 15 to 29, 750 (47.1%) aged 30 to 64, and 285 (17.9%) aged 65 or older.

People could identify as more than one ethnicity. The results were 91.3% European (Pākehā); 15.4% Māori; 2.3% Pasifika; 2.8% Asian; 0.4% Middle Eastern, Latin American and African New Zealanders (MELAA); and 3.0% other, which includes people giving their ethnicity as "New Zealander". English was spoken by 97.7%, Māori by 2.1%, Samoan by 0.6%, and other languages by 4.0%. No language could be spoken by 1.7% (e.g. too young to talk). New Zealand Sign Language was known by 0.6%. The percentage of people born overseas was 9.4, compared with 28.8% nationally.

Religious affiliations were 25.2% Christian, 0.2% Hindu, 0.4% Māori religious beliefs, 0.4% Buddhist, 0.4% New Age, and 0.9% other religions. People who answered that they had no religion were 64.4%, and 8.1% of people did not answer the census question.

Of those at least 15 years old, 87 (6.6%) people had a bachelor's or higher degree, 783 (59.0%) had a post-high school certificate or diploma, and 459 (34.6%) people exclusively held high school qualifications. The median income was $30,700, compared with $41,500 nationally. 54 people (4.1%) earned over $100,000 compared to 12.1% nationally. The employment status of those at least 15 was 582 (43.9%) full-time, 180 (13.6%) part-time, and 57 (4.3%) unemployed.

== Education ==
Cobden School is a coeducational full primary (years 1–8) school with a roll of 100 students as of March 2026. It opened in 1868. The main building was badly damaged in the 1968 Inangahua earthquake and was demolished and rebuilt.

== Utilities ==
Cobden had a postmaster from 1865. A post office was mentioned in 1880, though it wasn't until 1901 that a post office was reported as opened. A telephone office opened in Gillingham's store in 1900. In the 1950s it was at 124 Bright St, where the old building remains. It closed from 5 February 1988, when Postmaster-General, Richard Prebble, closed or reduced 580 offices. Later in the year it reopened as a Postbank. A fibre optic cable link from Nelson to Greymouth crosses the bridge at Cobden.

As part of Greymouth's water supply, treated water is pumped from Coal Creek, about a kilometre away, to supply over 500 houses in Cobden. A similar area, with 14 km (8.7 mi) of pipe, developed from 1920, has sewage piped to the Grey River, with screening and UV treatment. A project to divert the sewage to Greymouth's Preston Road treatment plant began in 2025.

Electric street lighting began in 1926.
