= Karoro, New Zealand =

Suburb of Greymouth, New Zealand

Coordinates: 42.473466°S 171.186966°E

Karoro
- Suburb
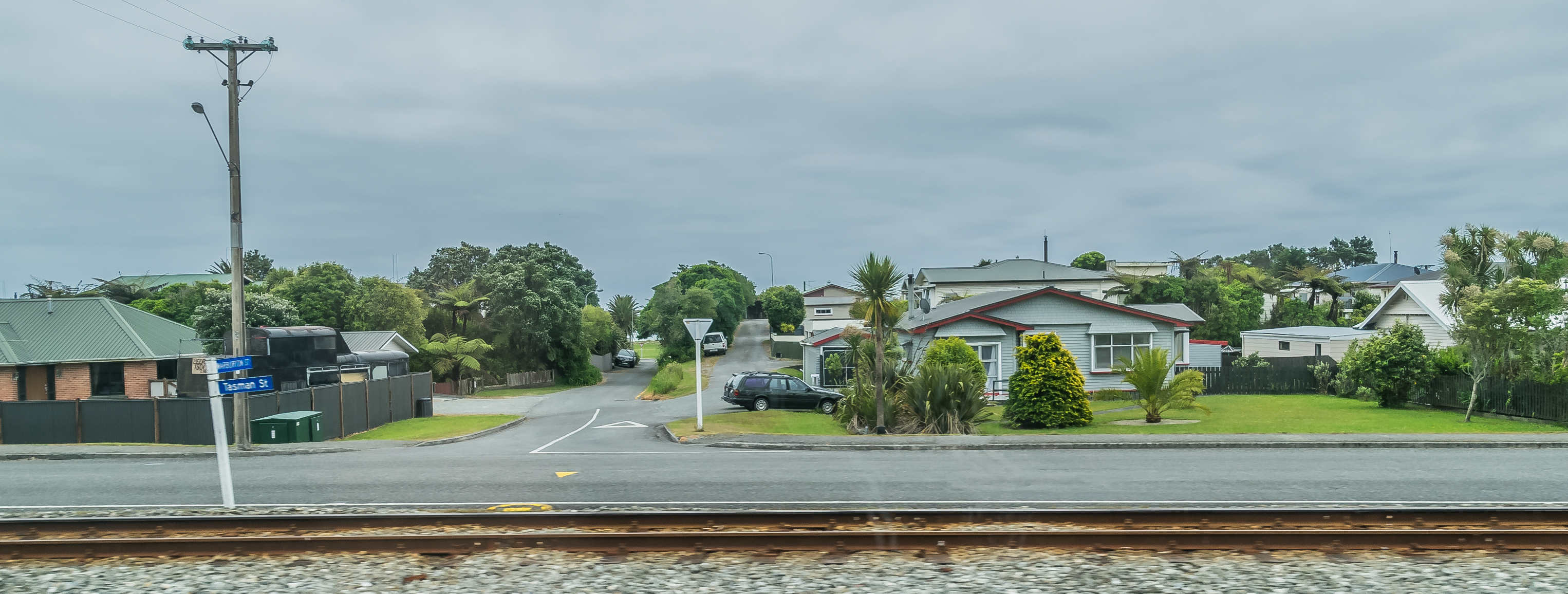
- Warburton Street
- Interactive map of Karoro
- Country: New Zealand
- City: Greymouth
- Local authority: Grey District Council
- Electoral ward: Central

Area
  - Land: 649 ha (1,600 acres)

Population (June 2025)
  - Total: 1,110
  - Density: 171/km^{2} (443/sq mi)

	Blaketown	Greymouth centre
(Tasman Sea)	Karoro
	Paroa	Boddytown

Karoro is a suburb to the south-west of Greymouth on the West Coast of New Zealand.

== Demographics ==
Karoro covers 6.49 km^{2} (2.51 sq mi) and had an estimated population of 1,110 as of June 2025, with a population density of 171 people per km^{2}.

Historical population
Year	Pop.	±% p.a.
2006	1,008	—
2013	1,053	+0.63%
2018	1,017	−0.69%
2023	1,065	+0.93%

Karoro had a population of 1,065 in the 2023 New Zealand census, an increase of 48 people (4.7%) since the 2018 census, and an increase of 12 people (1.1%) since the 2013 census. There were 516 males, 546 females, and 3 people of other genders in 432 dwellings. 2.0% of people identified as LGBTIQ+. The median age was 49.1 years (compared with 38.1 years nationally). There were 171 people (16.1%) aged under 15 years, 153 (14.4%) aged 15 to 29, 480 (45.1%) aged 30 to 64, and 261 (24.5%) aged 65 or older.

People could identify as more than one ethnicity. The results were 92.7% European (Pākehā); 8.7% Māori; 0.6% Pasifika; 2.5% Asian; 1.7% Middle Eastern, Latin American and African New Zealanders (MELAA); and 3.4% other, which includes people giving their ethnicity as "New Zealander". English was spoken by 98.6%, Māori by 1.7%, and other languages by 6.5%. No language could be spoken by 1.1% (e.g. too young to talk). New Zealand Sign Language was known by 0.3%. The percentage of people born overseas was 13.8, compared with 28.8% nationally.

Religious affiliations were 35.5% Christian, 0.8% Hindu, 0.6% Māori religious beliefs, 0.3% Buddhist, 0.3% New Age, 0.3% Jewish, and 0.8% other religions. People who answered that they had no religion were 54.1%, and 7.0% of people did not answer the census question.

Of those at least 15 years old, 174 (19.5%) people had a bachelor's or higher degree, 510 (57.0%) had a post-high school certificate or diploma, and 210 (23.5%) people exclusively held high school qualifications. The median income was $45,000, compared with $41,500 nationally. 114 people (12.8%) earned over $100,000 compared to 12.1% nationally. The employment status of those at least 15 was 453 (50.7%) full-time, 141 (15.8%) part-time, and 6 (0.7%) unemployed.

== Education ==
Karoro School is a coeducational full primary (years 1–8) school with a roll of 163 students as of March 2026. It celebrated its 50th jubilee in 2008.
