= Mayor of Grey =

Local official in Greymouth, New Zealand

Mayor of Grey District

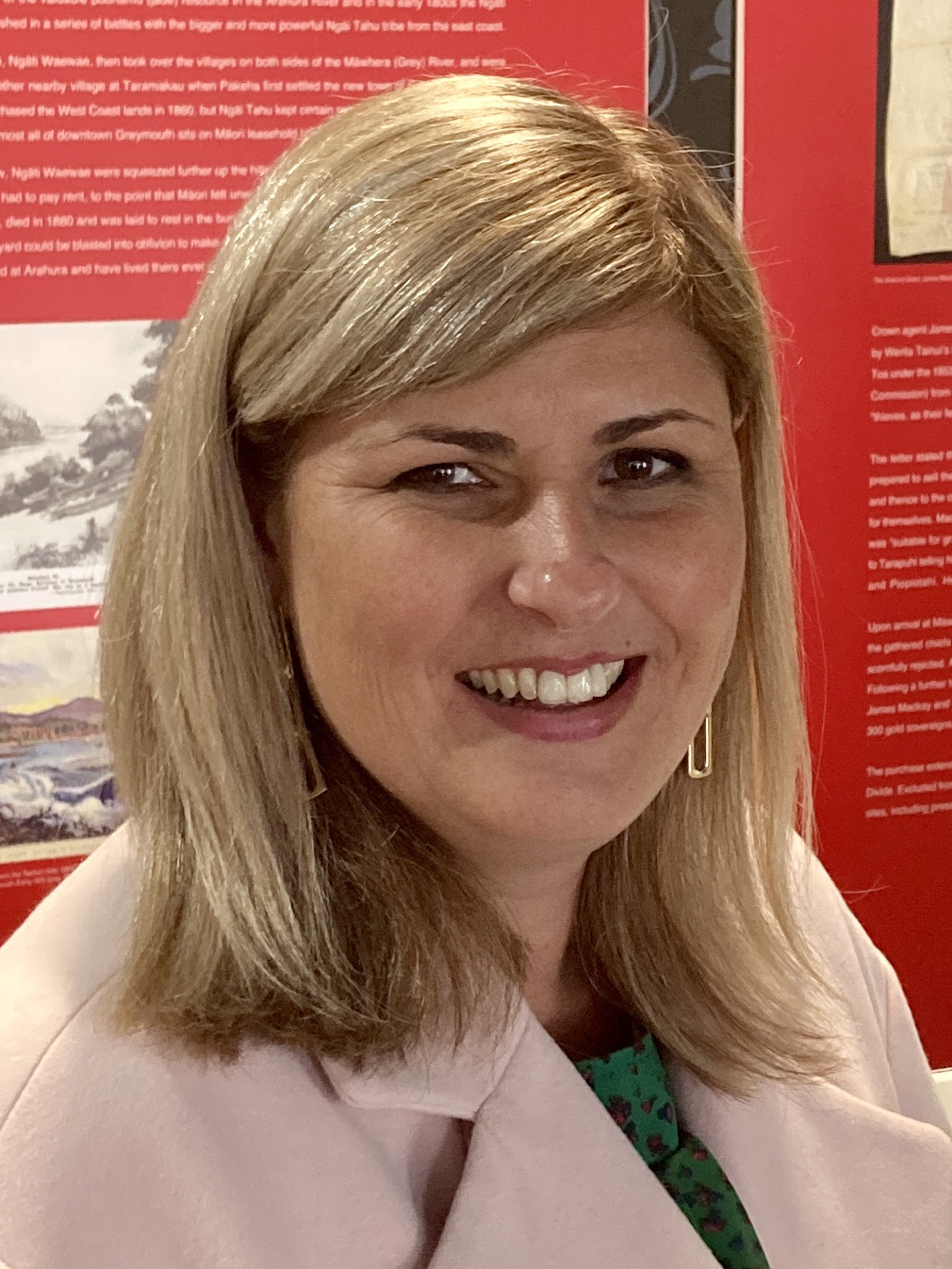
- Incumbent; Tania Gibson since 31 October 2019
- Style: Her Worship the Mayor
- Seat: Greymouth
- Term length: Three years, renewable
- Inaugural holder: Barry Dallas
- Formation: 1989
- Deputy: Allan Gibson
- Salary: $116,626
- Website: Official website

The Grey District mayor, often referred to as the mayor of Greymouth, officiates over the Grey District of New Zealand which is administered by the Grey District Council, with its seat in Greymouth. The current mayor is Tania Gibson. Two predecessors to this office were the mayor of Greymouth, officiating over the Greymouth Borough Council from 1868, and from 1877 the chairman of the Grey County Council.

== History ==
The Greymouth Borough was constituted in 1868 under the Municipal Corporations Act, 1867. This covered the urban area of Greymouth.

After provincial government had been abolished in 1876, counties were formed in the following year. One of those was Grey County that covered an area around Greymouth. The first chairman of Grey County was Arthur Guinness.

Greymouth Borough and Grey County were abolished in the 1989 local government reforms, when the areas became part of Grey District. Since then, the head of the administration has been the mayor of Grey.

== Lists of mayors and chairmen ==
=== Mayors of Greymouth Borough ===
The first elections were held in Greymouth Borough on 26 August 1868, when nine councillors were elected. Even before the councillors met for the first time, it was discovered that the legislation required for three of them to retire by rotation on 10 September. All three councillors stood for re-election, but one of them was replaced by Edward Masters. At the first meeting of the council in the following week, Masters was elected the first mayor of Greymouth by his fellow councillors.

Barry Dallas was mayor of Greymouth from 1966 to 1968, and from 1980 until the borough's abolition in 1989. He then became the inaugural mayor of the new Grey District.

	Name	Portrait	Term	Notes
1	Edward Masters		1868–1870	
2	Joseph Kilgour		1870	
3	Edward Wickes		1871–1872	
4	George Glen		1873	
5	William Simpson Smith		1874	
6	George William Moss		1875–1876	First ratepayer election
7	Francis Hamilton		1877–1878	
8	Richard Nancarrow		1879–1881	
9	James Barkley		1882–1883	
10	Fritz Carl Dupre		1884	
11	John Griffiths Thomas		1885	
(8)	Richard Nancarrow		1886	second period
12	Joseph Petrie		1887–1888	Mayor paid £100 annually; last borough in New Zealand to pay
13	John Mitchell		1889–1890	
14	Andrew Matheson		1891–1892	
15	William Robert Kettle		1893–1894	
16	Frederick Barrington Waters		1894	
17	Felix Campbell		1894–1895	
18	Jacob Theodore Skoglund		1896–1898	
(14)	Andrew Matheson		1899–1903	second period
19	Jesse Steer		1903–1904	
20	James Andrew Petrie		1904–1907	
(12)	Joseph Petrie		1907–1908	second period
21	Thomas Coates		1908–1910	
22	Alfred Charles Russell		1910–1912	
23	George Edward Perkins		1912–1917	
24	James Daniel Lynch		1917–1923	
25	William Henry Parfitt		1923–1927	
26	John Webber Greenslade		1927–1935	9 years service
27	William Meldrum		1935–1938	
28	Fred Kitchingham		1938–1947	9 years service
29	Fred Boustridge		1947–1950	
30	Frederick Lovell Turley		1950–1953	
31	Frederick William Baillie		1954–1965	12 years service
32	Barry Dallas		1965–1968	
33	Ossie Jackson		1968–1980	12 years service
(32)	Barry Dallas		1980–1989	second period

=== Chairmen of Grey County ===
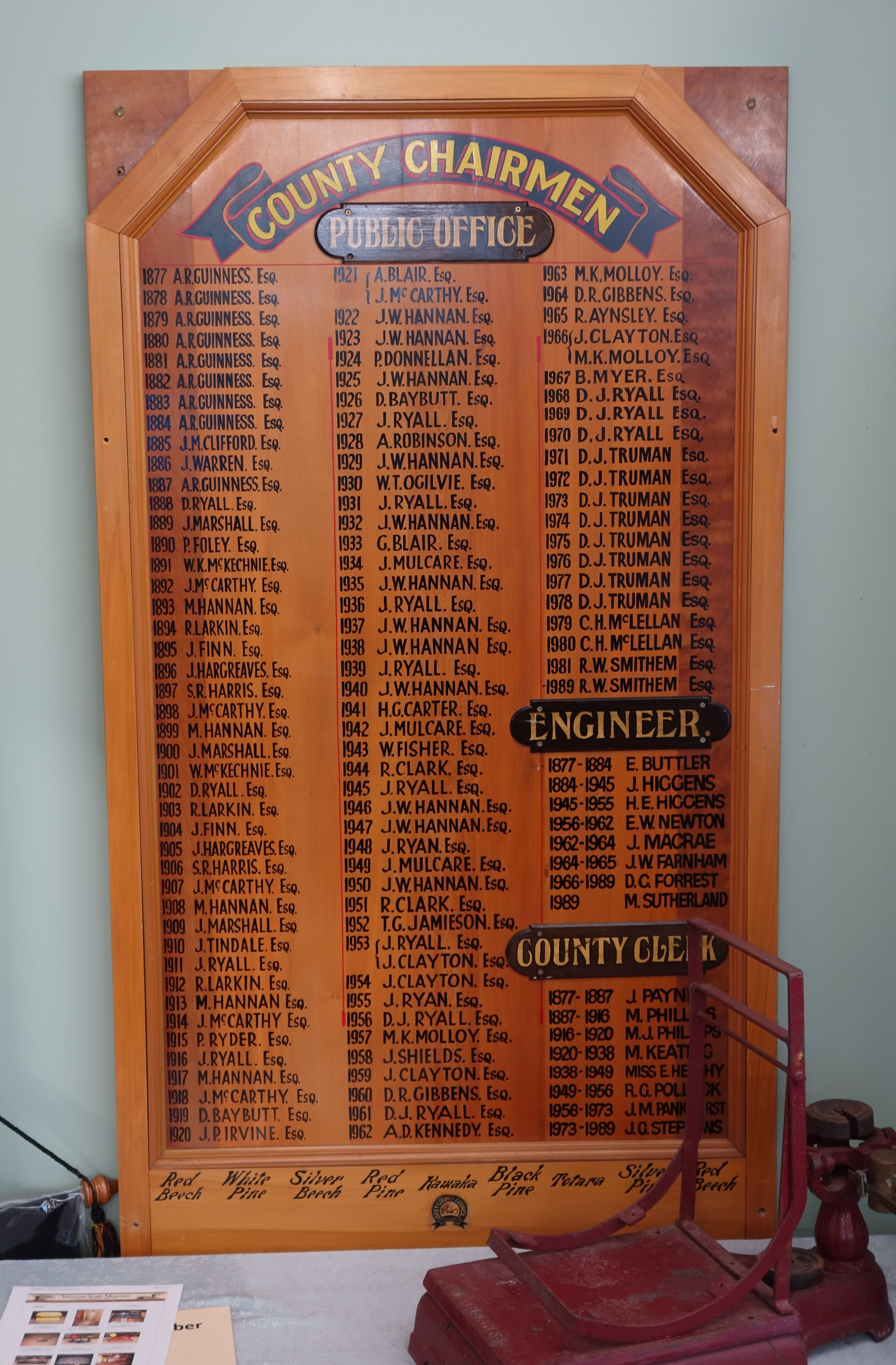
Grey County chairmen

	Name	Term	Notes
1	Arthur Guinness	1877–1884	
2	John Mangan Clifford	1885	
3	John Warren	1886	
(1)	Arthur Guinness	1887	2nd period
4	Denis Ryall	1888	
5	James Marshall	1889	
6	Patrick Foley	1890	
7	William McKechnie	1891	
8	J. McCarthy	1892	
9	Michael Hannan	1893	
10	R. Larkin	1894	
11	James Finn	1895	
12	James Hargreaves	1896	
13	S. R. Harris	1897	
(8)	J. McCarthy	1898	2nd period
(9)	Michael Hannan	1899	2nd period
(5)	James Marshall	1900	2nd period
(7)	William McKechnie	1901	2nd period
(4)	Denis Ryall	1902	2nd period
(10)	R. Larkin	1903	2nd period
(11)	James Finn	1904	2nd period
(12)	James Hargreaves	1905	2nd period
(13)	S. R. Harris	1906	2nd period
(8)	J. McCarthy	1907	3rd period
(9)	Michael Hannan	1908	3rd period
(5)	James Marshall	1909	3rd period
14	John Tindale	1910	
15	John Ryall	1911	
(10)	R. Larkin	1912	3rd period
(9)	Michael Hannan	1913	4th period
(8)	J. McCarthy	1914	4th period
16	P. Ryder	1915	
(15)	John Ryall	1916	2nd period
(9)	Michael Hannan	1917	5th period
(8)	J. McCarthy	1918	5th period
17	D. Baybutt	1919	
18	J. P. Irvine	1920	
19	A. Blair	1921	
(8)	J. McCarthy	1921	6th period
20	Jack Hannan	1922–1923	
21	P. Donnellan	1924	
(20)	Jack Hannan	1925	2nd period
(17)	D. Baybutt	1926	2nd period
(15)	John Ryall	1927	3rd period
22	A. Robinson	1928	
(20)	Jack Hannan	1929	3rd period
23	W. T. Ogilvie	1930	
(15)	John Ryall	1931	4th period
(20)	Jack Hannan	1932	4th period
24	G. Blair	1933	
25	J. Mulcare	1934	
(20)	Jack Hannan	1935	5th period
(15)	John Ryall	1936	5th period
(20)	Jack Hannan	1937–1938	6th period
(15)	John Ryall	1939	6th period
(20)	Jack Hannan	1940	7th period
26	H. G. Carter	1941	
(25)	J. Mulcare	1942	2nd period
27	W. Fisher	1943	
28	R. Clark	1944	
(15)	John Ryall	1945	7th period
(20)	Jack Hannan	1946–1947	8th period
29	J. Ryan	1948	
(25)	J. Mulcare	1949	3rd period
(20)	Jack Hannan	1950	9th period
(28)	R. Clark	1951	2nd period
30	T. G. Jamieson	1952	
(15)	John Ryall	1953	8th period; died 26 May 1953
31	J. Clayton	1953–1954	
(29)	J. Ryan	1955	2nd period
32	D. J. Ryall	1956	
33	M. K. Molloy	1957	
34	J. Shields	1958	
(31)	J. Clayton	1959	2nd period
35	D. R. Gibbens	1960	
(32)	D. J. Ryall	1961	2nd period
36	A. D. Kennedy	1962	
(33)	M. K. Molloy	1963	2nd period
(35)	D. R. Gibbens	1964	2nd period
37	R. Aynsley	1965	
(31)	J. Clayton	1966	3rd period
(33)	M. K. Molloy	1966	3rd period
38	B. Myer	1967	
(32)	D. J. Ryall	1968–1970	3rd period
39	Doug Truman	1971–1978	
40	C. H. McLellan	1979–1980	
41	Bob Smithem	1981–1989	

=== Mayors of Grey District ===
	Name	Portrait	Term	Notes
1	Barry Dallas		1989–1991	14 years service of Greymouth and Grey District
2	Ron Hibbs		1991–1998	
3	Kevin Brown		1998–2004	
4	Tony Kokshoorn		2004–2019	15 years service. Longest-serving mayor of Greymouth and Grey District
5	Tania Gibson		2019–present	Greymouth's first woman mayor
