= Grey District =

- Territorial authority district
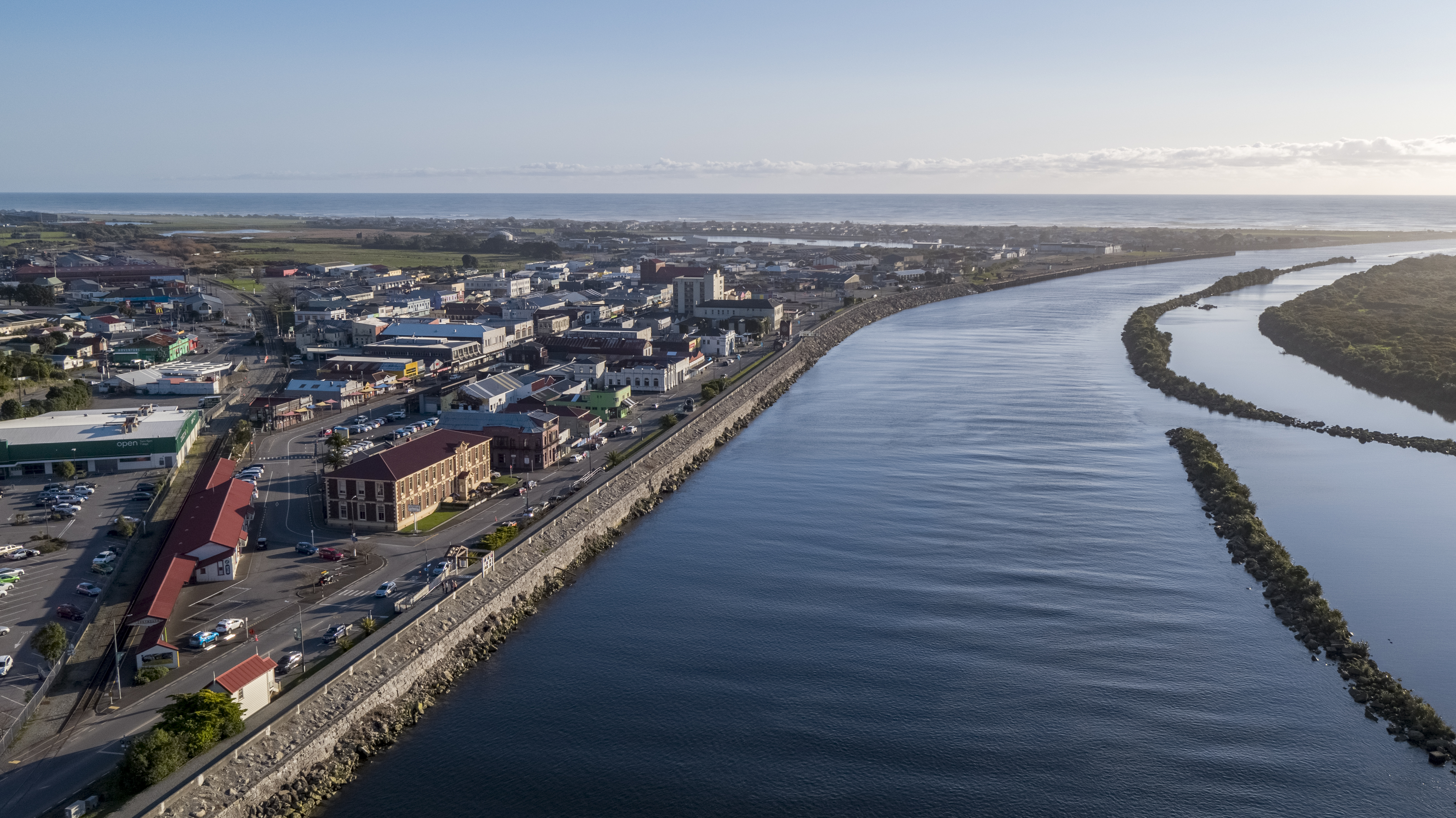

- Grey district in the South Island
- Coordinates: 42°32′46″S 171°36′22″E
- Country: New Zealand
- Region: West Coast Regional Council
- Wards: Northern; Central; Southern; Eastern
- Seat: Greymouth

Government
  - Mayor: Tania Gibson
  - Territorial authority: Grey District Council

Area
  - Total: 3,474.31 km^{2} (1,341.44 sq mi)

Population (June 2025)
  - Total: 14,600
  - Density: 4.20/km^{2} (10.9/sq mi)
- Time zone: UTC+12 (NZST)
  - Summer (DST): UTC+13 (NZDT)
- Postcode(s): Map of postcodes
- Area code: 03
- Website: www.greydc.govt.nz

Grey District is a district in the West Coast Region of New Zealand that covers Greymouth, Runanga, Blackball, Cobden, and settlements along the Grey River. It has a land area of 3,474.31 square kilometres (1,341.44 sq mi). The seat of the Grey District Council, the local government authority that administers the district, is at Greymouth, where 59.0% of the district's population live.

The Grey District is on the West Coast of the South Island. It stretches from the south banks of the Punakaiki River in the north, southeast to Mt Anderson, north to The Pinacle, southeast to Craigeburn, in a southeast direction to Mt Barron, southwest to Jacksons and following the Taramakau River to the Tasman Sea.

The district is rich in history and character. Key industries are tourism, mining, agriculture, fishing, manufacturing and services industries. The main hospital for the West Coast is in Greymouth.

== Demographics ==
Grey District covers 3,474.31 km^{2} (1,341.44 sq mi) and had an estimated population of 14,600 as of June 2025, with a population density of 4.2 people per km^{2}. 8,610 live in Greymouth and 1,200 in Runanga.

Historical population
Year	Pop.	±% p.a.
2006	13,221	—
2013	13,371	+0.16%
2018	13,344	−0.04%
2023	14,043	+1.03%

Grey District had a population of 14,043 in the 2023 New Zealand census, an increase of 699 people (5.2%) since the 2018 census, and an increase of 672 people (5.0%) since the 2013 census. There were 7,128 males, 6,858 females and 57 people of other genders in 5,667 dwellings. 2.6% of people identified as LGBTIQ+. The median age was 44.9 years (compared with 38.1 years nationally). There were 2,538 people (18.1%) aged under 15 years, 2,118 (15.1%) aged 15 to 29, 6,462 (46.0%) aged 30 to 64, and 2,922 (20.8%) aged 65 or older.

People could identify as more than one ethnicity. The results were 90.7% European (Pākehā); 11.8% Māori; 1.4% Pasifika; 4.0% Asian; 0.5% Middle Eastern, Latin American and African New Zealanders (MELAA); and 4.2% other, which includes people giving their ethnicity as "New Zealander". English was spoken by 97.9%, Māori language by 1.8%, Samoan by 0.1% and other languages by 5.0%. No language could be spoken by 1.8% (e.g. too young to talk). New Zealand Sign Language was known by 0.6%. The percentage of people born overseas was 11.7, compared with 28.8% nationally.

Religious affiliations were 31.6% Christian, 0.6% Hindu, 0.3% Islam, 0.2% Māori religious beliefs, 0.3% Buddhist, 0.6% New Age, and 1.2% other religions. People who answered that they had no religion were 56.9%, and 8.4% of people did not answer the census question.

Of those at least 15 years old, 1,068 (9.3%) people had a bachelor's or higher degree, 6,711 (58.3%) had a post-high school certificate or diploma, and 3,357 (29.2%) people exclusively held high school qualifications. The median income was $34,200, compared with $41,500 nationally. 858 people (7.5%) earned over $100,000 compared to 12.1% nationally. The employment status of those at least 15 was that 5,433 (47.2%) people were employed full-time, 1,671 (14.5%) were part-time, and 279 (2.4%) were unemployed.

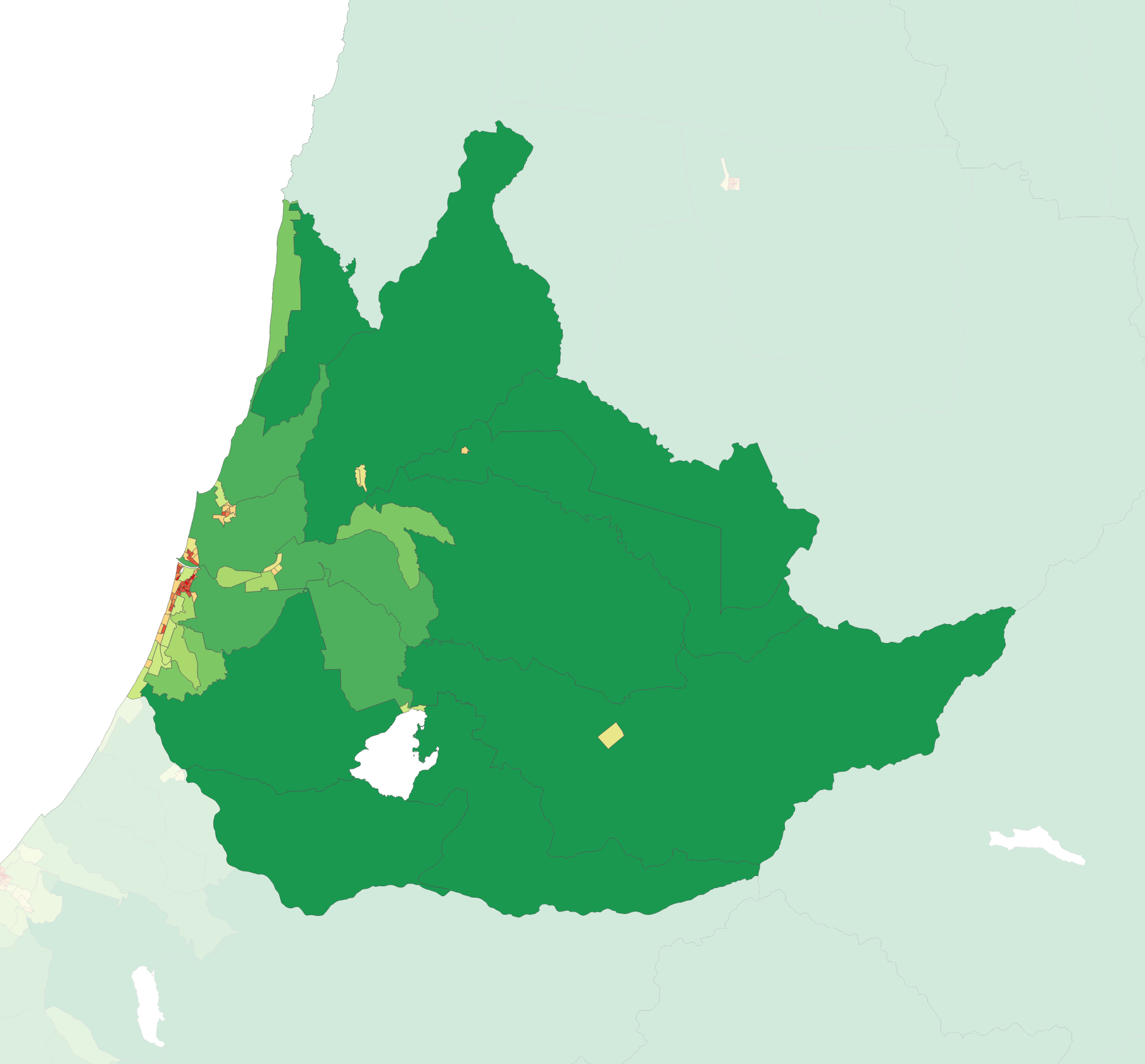
Population density in the 2023 census

Individual wards
Name	Area (km^{2})	Population	Density (per km^{2})	Dwellings	Median age	Median income
Northern Ward	264.26	1,629	6.2	729	50.3 years	$29,100
Central Ward	16.94	5,115	301.9	2,205	43.8 years	$31,600
Southern Ward	223.61	3,702	16.6	1,464	47.0 years	$45,000
Eastern Ward	2,969.50	3,597	1.2	1,269	40.6 years	$32,300
New Zealand					38.1 years	$41,500

== History ==
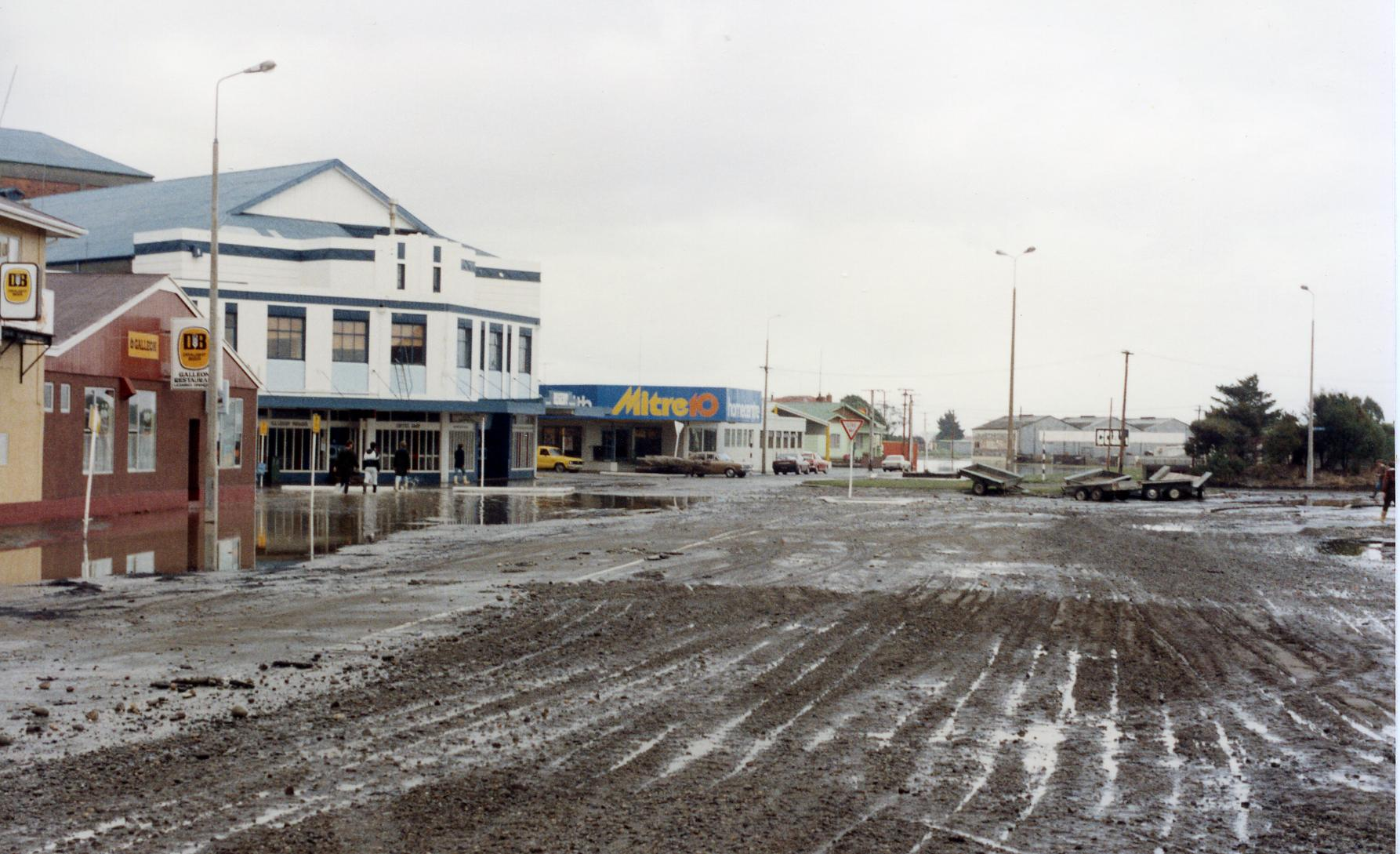
Greymouth floods (1988)

The first buildings at the Grey River mouth were constructed by Ngati Wairangi Maori at Cobden. European settlement followed the discovery of coal and gold.

Greymouth, the district’s largest centre, lies beside the Tasman Sea and the Grey River. Greymouth experienced a rapid change in the cultural makeup of the region, reflecting an influx of migrants drawn to the gold rush, mining and related business opportunities.

As Greymouth developed, it became vulnerable to flooding. After two major floods in 1988, the Greymouth flood wall project was undertaken. Completed in 1990, the flood wall provides security for the town, and has allowed commerce to develop further.

A Māori settlement at Māwhera pā was long-established on the south bank of the Māwheranui river. When the first European explorers, Thomas Brunner and Charles Heaphy, arrived in 1846, they stayed at the pā, and were given food. Two years later, Brunner travelled up the river, which he renamed after Governor George Grey.

James Mackay negotiated with local Māori chiefs for the purchase of the West Coast region by the government, and the agreement was signed at Māwhera pā on 21 May 1860. One of the few Māori reserves was the land around the pā, now forming the main business district in Greymouth, and most of this still remains in Māori ownership.

== Infrastructure ==
There are 619 km of road in the district, of which 358 km are sealed (2000s data).
