= Grey District Council =

Territorial authority in New Zealand

Coordinates: 42.4524633°S 171.2075188°E

Type
- Type: Unicameral of Grey District
- Houses: Governing Body
- Term limits: None

History
- Founded: 6 March 1989

Leadership
- Mayor: Tania Gibson

Structure
- Seats: 9 (1 mayor, 8 ward seats)
- Length of term: 3 years

Website
- greydc.govt.nz

Grey District Council is the territorial authority for the Grey District of New Zealand.

The council is led by the Mayor of Grey, who is currently Tania Gibson. There are also eight ward councillors.

The council operates five departments: Executive Office, Operations, Corporate Services, Community, Economic Development & Regulatory Services.

== Councillors ==
- Her Worship Mayor Tania Gibson
- Deputy Mayor Allan Gibson
- Eastern Ward: Deputy Mayor Allan Gibson, Cr Robert Mallinson
- Central Ward: Cr Jack O'Connor, Cr Tim Mora, Cr Peter Davy
- Northern Ward: Cr Kate Kennedy
- Southern Ward: Cr Paulette Birchfield, Cr Rex MacDonald

== History ==
The council was formed in 1989, replacing Greymouth County Council (1868–1989) and Runanga County Council (1912–1989).

In 2020, the council had 78 staff, including 10 earning more than $100,000. According to the right-wing New Zealand Taxpayers' Union think tank, residential rates averaged $1,739.

In December 2021, the council replaced four senior management roles during a restructure following a critical review. In late October 2022, Council chief executive Paul Morris proposed eliminating 17 executive and middle management roles in favour of creating nine new positions.

On 7 March 2024, Morris resigned as the Council's chief executive, effective immediately. On 13 March, the Greymouth Council appointed former chief executive Paul Prestorius as interim chief executive until a new chief executive could be recruited.

On 15 May 2024, the Council announced that it would be withdrawing from Local Government New Zealand, the representative body for local councils in New Zealand. Mayor of Grey Tania Gibson cited disagreement with the representative body's handling of the previous Sixth Labour Government's Three Waters reform programme as a reason for leaving the organisation.

In late September 2024, Joanne Soderlund was appointed as the Grey District's new chief executive. As the first female chief executive, Soderland had previously served as the chief executive of the Shire of Tammin in Western Australia.
