= Left Bank Art Gallery =

Art gallery in Greymouth, New Zealand

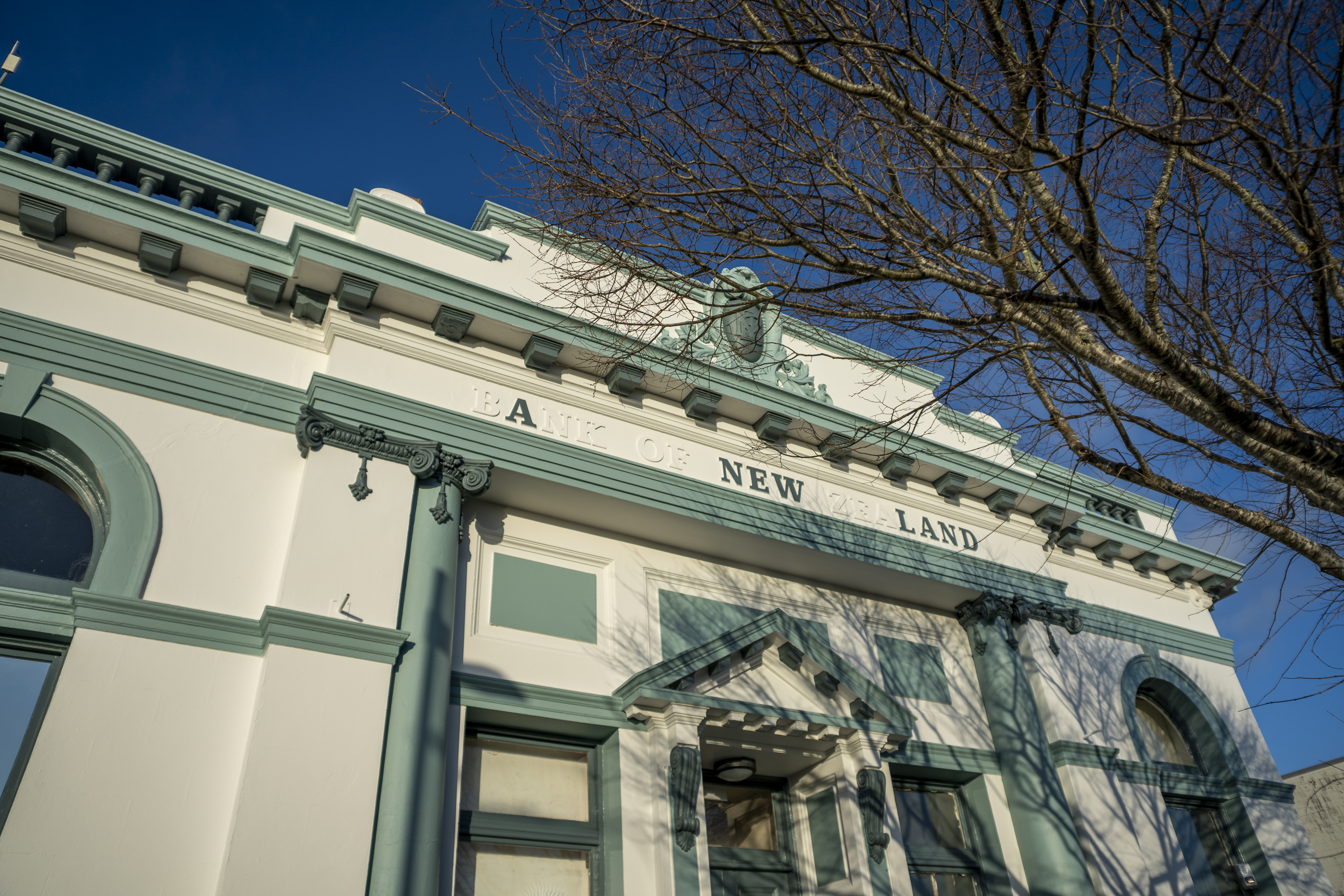
- Established: 1992
- Location: Greymouth
- Coordinates: 42.4480953°S 171.2090101°E
- Director: Cassandra Struve
- Website: www.leftbankartgallery.nz

The Left Bank Art Gallery is a public art gallery in Greymouth, New Zealand. Operated by the West Coast Society of Arts Inc, it opened in 1992 in a 1927 Bank of New Zealand building on the left bank of the Grey River. The only staffed public gallery on the West Coast, it exhibits artists from Karamea to Haast, and holds the National Pounamu Collection which was assembled from a biennial carving competition.

== Origin ==
There had been an Arts Society in Greymouth since the 1940s; its early members included George Chippendale, Arthur Foster, David Graham, Allan Holcroft, and St Clair Sofield; they were joined by Toss Wollaston in 1949. Art exhibitions were held in private rooms, hostels, the Copper Room of the Union Hotel, or on one occasion in an alleyway behind King's Hotel. Even in the 1980s there was no permanent art gallery; as Greymouth artist Rod Leonard recalled, "We hit a wall of opposition. People said we didn't need one."

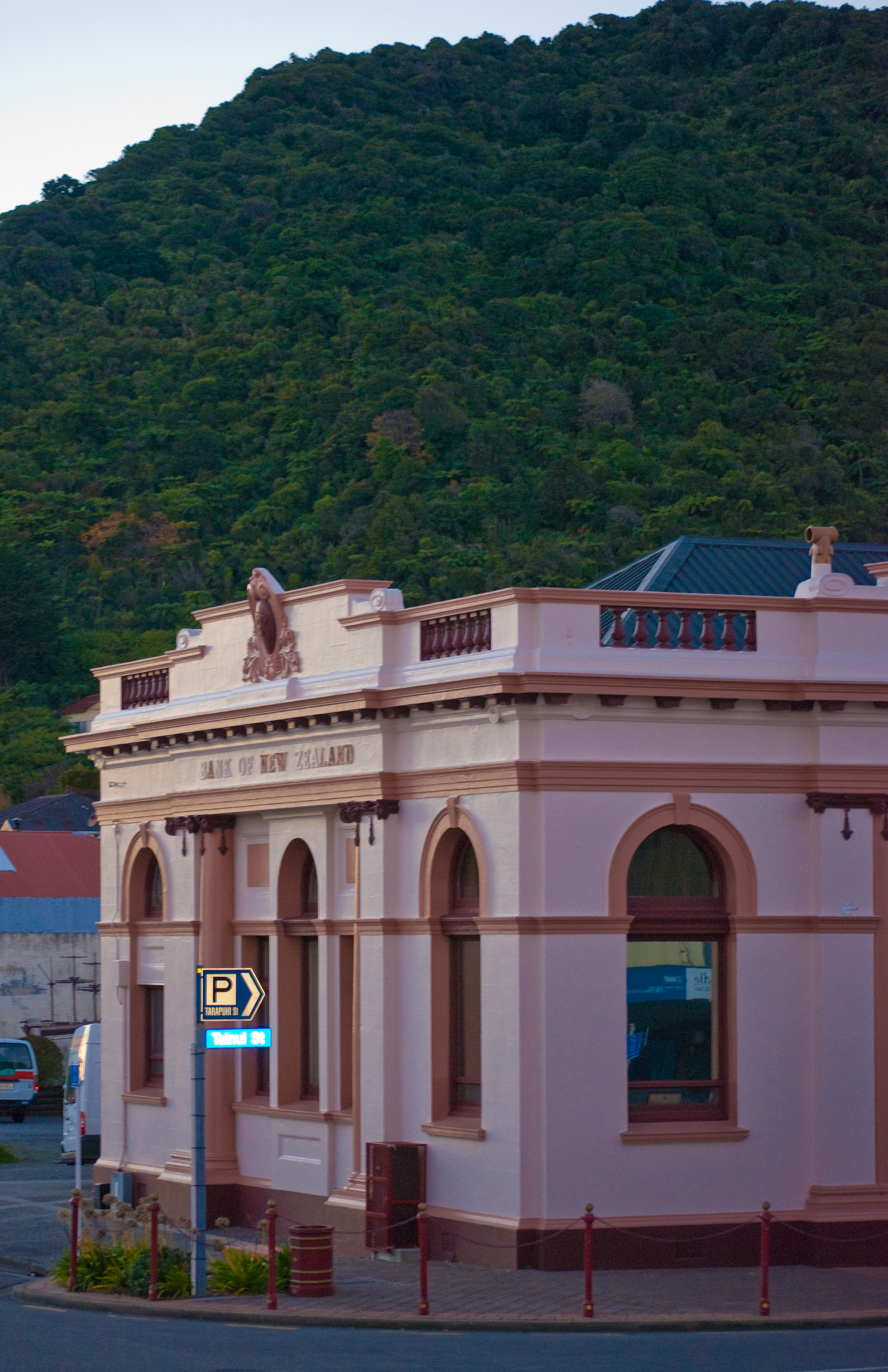
The former Bank of New Zealand building after being repainted in 2006

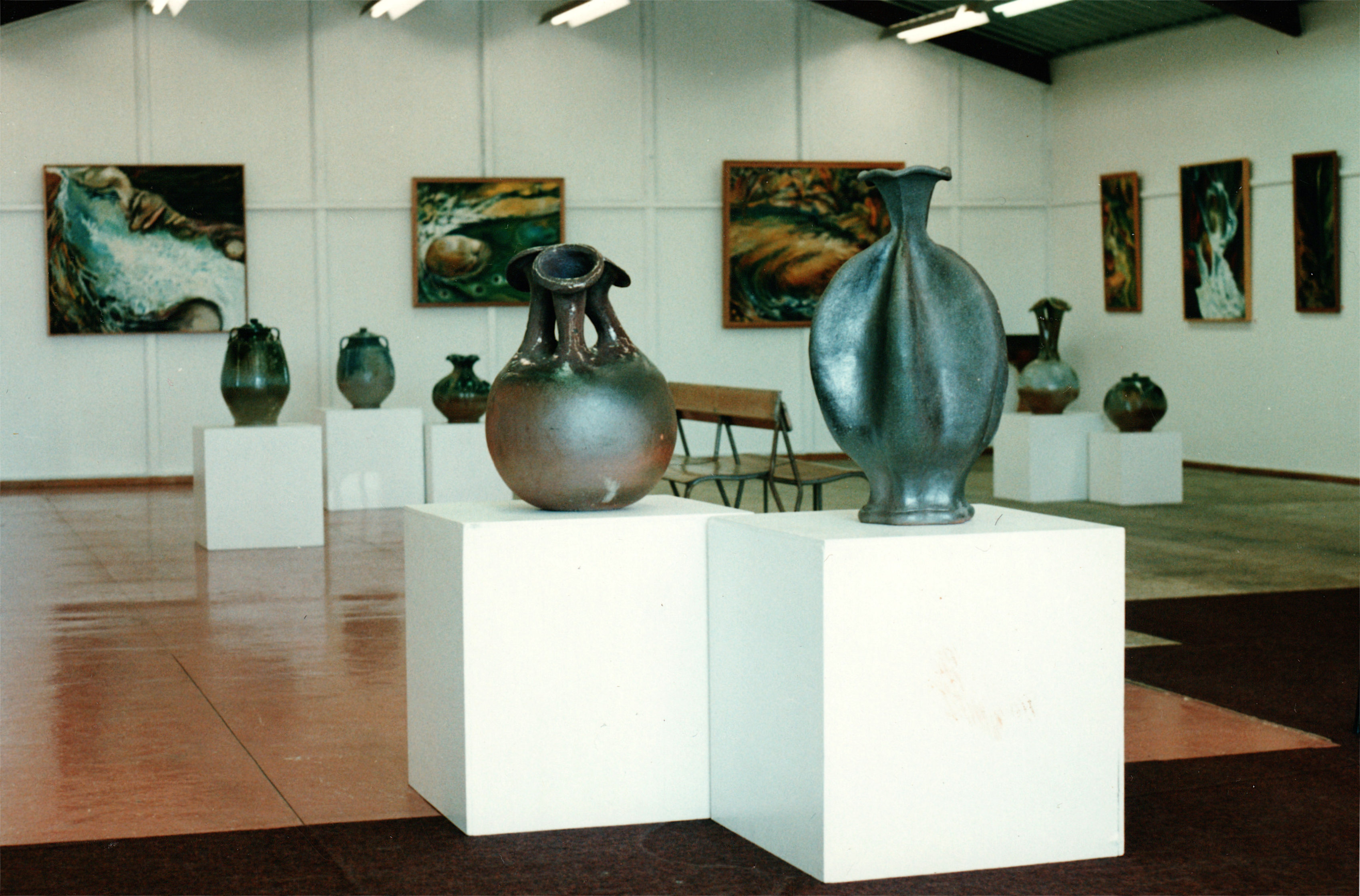
Yvonne Rust paintings and Ian Dalzell pottery in "Rivers of the West Coast", Shed 2, Christmas 1990.

In 1981 Greymouth mayor Dr Barry Dallas called a meeting to establish a public gallery on the West Coast. Acting chair of the Westland Community Arts Council Roger Ewer worked with Dallas to create an exhibition space on the vacant first floor of the Greymouth Borough Council Chambers, on the corner of Puketahi and Tainui streets in central Greymouth. The first exhibition in February 1982, opened by Toss Wollaston, was a "vast display" of West Coast painting and photography. The West Coast Society of Arts Inc. (WCSA) was formed to run the gallery, using volunteers and government-funded Project Employment Programme workers. The gallery held major biennial exhibitions of jade carving in 1984 and 1986, sponsored by Air New Zealand. A donation of $15,000 from BP NZ Ltd allowed it to purchase three works by Olivia Spencer-Bower, the nucleus of its permanent collection. In April 1987 the space in the Borough Council Chambers was taken over by the newly-formed Timberlands, and the Arts Society was homeless.

The WCSA staged exhibitions in the Trowbridge Room, and ran the 1988 jade exhibition in the Ashley Motor Inn. In September 1989 a new exhibition space with an "uninspiring exterior" was created at 29 Lord Street in Greymouth's industrial area. The former National Library service centre was christened Shed 2. Shed 2 exhibitions included a retrospective of Dusty Rhodes' work and Yvonne Rust's paintings. A public meeting attended by 130 created pressure on the Council to establish a permanent gallery.

== BNZ building ==
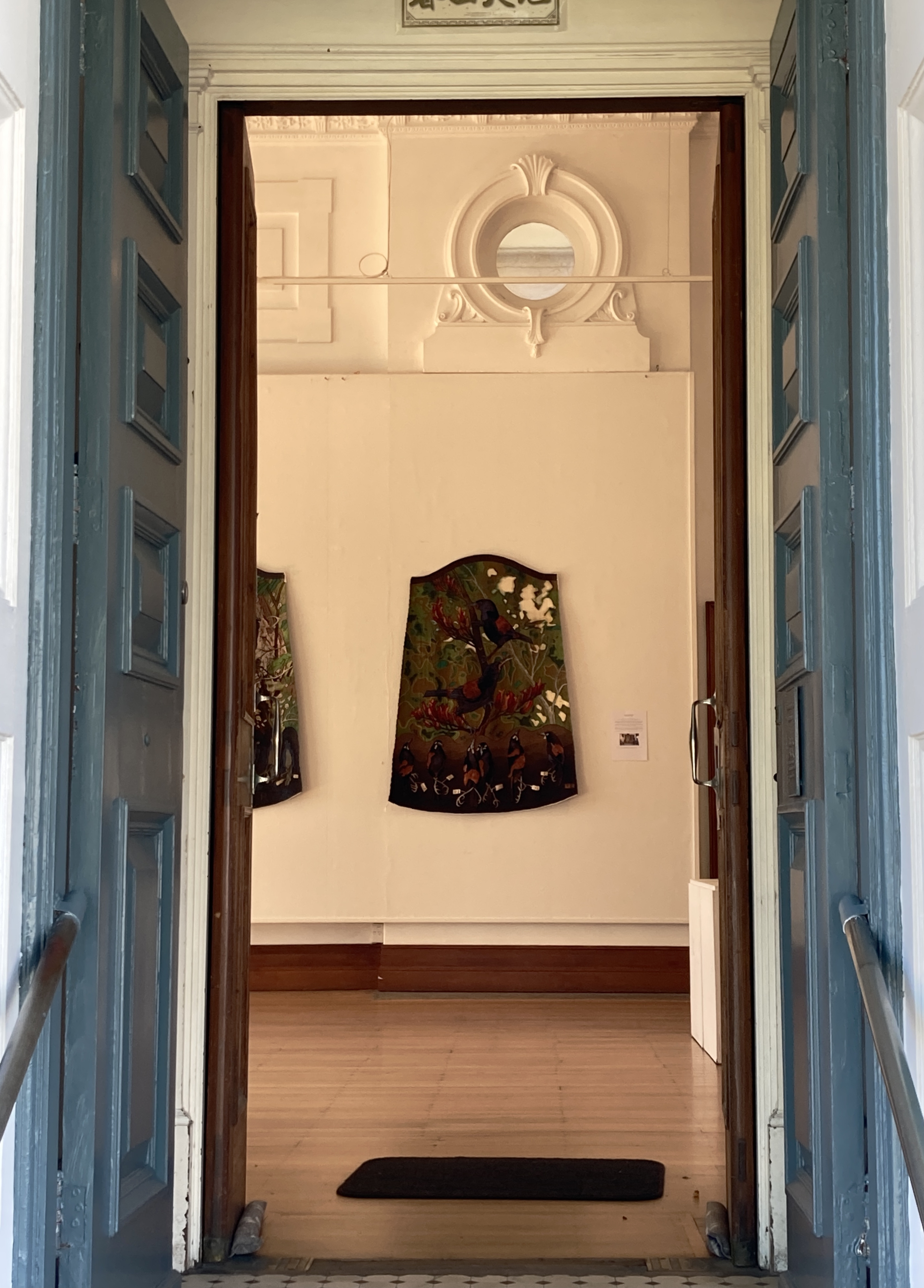
Main entrance framing a Marilyn Rea-Menzies tapestry.

In 1988 the Bank of New Zealand vacated its 1927 brick and concrete corner building at 1 Tainui Street. It was purchased by local architect Gary Hopkinson in 1990, repainted, and refurbished. The Grey District Council purchased it for $100,000, including $55,000 from the Lottery Grants Board, and leased it to the West Coast Society of Arts Inc. The WCSA then refurbished the building and added an entrance ramp. The interior consisted of three exhibition spaces with a 6 metre ceiling, and the upstairs (once the assistant bank manager's flat) was later converted into environmentally-controlled storage. A green and yellow colour scheme chosen by WCSA chair Sue Syme was applied in 1998, and was replaced by burgundy, fawn, and pearl in 2006, and white after the gallery's earthquake strengthening.

The Left Bank Art Gallery was officially opened by Greymouth mayor Ron Hibbs in its new premises on Saturday 23 May 1992, although the gallery had been open to the public since 20 March, and opened its first show – a collection of Anne Donovan watercolours – on 28 March. The opening had been brought forward in the hope Barry Dallas, the mayor who had supported the WCSA and arranged the purchase of the building, could attend, but he had died a month earlier on 21 April. To mark the opening two large pounamu boulders were installed, one inanga from the Arahura River and one kawakawa from Kaniere: four North Island carvers had worked on one, five South Islanders on the other. They had been purchased by the 1990 Commission and blessed by the Governor General Sir Paul Reeves, and were joined by a flax rope made by Auckland weaver Dante Bonica.

In April 2017 the Left Bank building was assessed at just 15–25% of the seismic strength required under the National Building Standard (the minimum threshold for public buildings was 34%). The gallery closed in April 2018 while the $300,000 strengthening was carried out and disabled access was built at the rear, and reopened in February 2019.

== Exhibitions ==
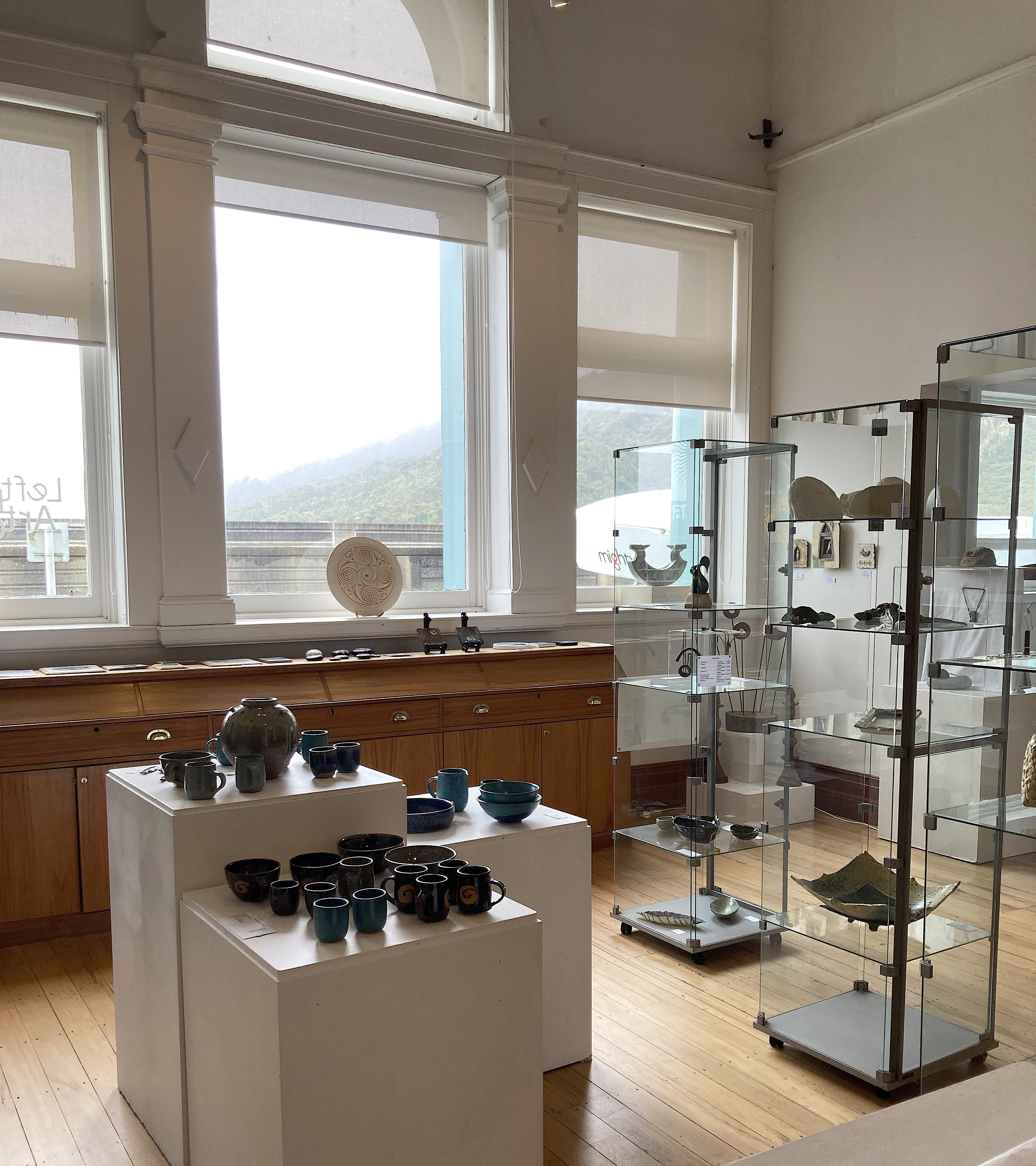
Interior of main gallery

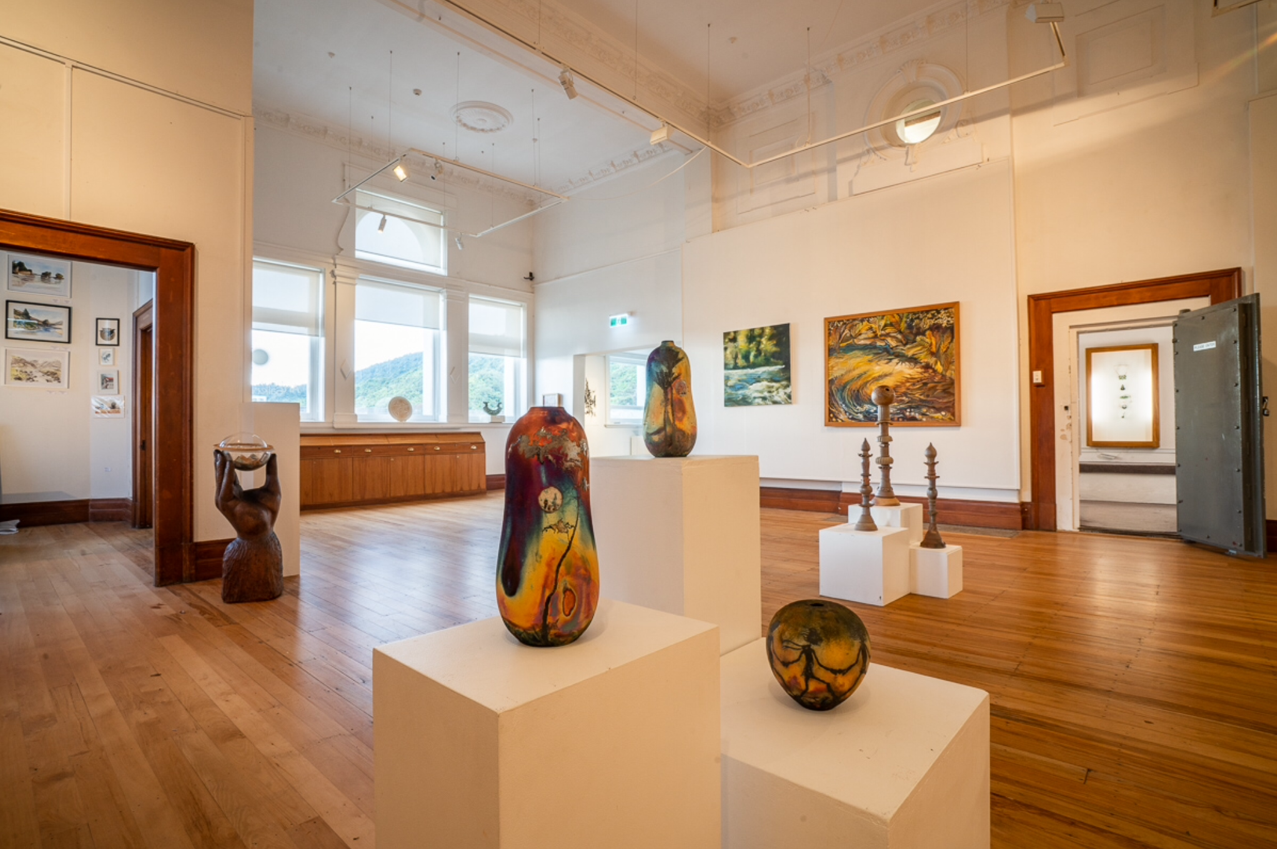
Interior of main gallery

The first official exhibition was a selection of West Coast works by Allan Holcroft, mounted by his son Graham, and a smaller exhibition of works by Evelyn Hewlett in a side gallery. In October 1992 the Left Bank exhibited a collection of painted and sculpted nudes, something that "wouldn't have been tolerated on the West Coast 20 years ago". In July 1993 it staged a 30-year retrospective of prints by Pat Hanly. In February 1994 it exhibited a joint show of Catherine Brough's West Coast landscapes and Sue Syme's satirical watercolours. A July 1998 show included local artists Syme, Peter Tennant, Greg Smith, Helen Davidson, and Jim Tennant. With the return of Yvonne Rust to the West Coast in 1998, the gallery staged Coasters In Clay, a retrospective of local potters that featured Chris Weaver and Andrew Nolan. In 2005 the gallery exhibited large-scale canvases by Philip Trusttum. By 2017 the gallery was running an annual Creative Click exhibition for West Coast photographers. The 2018 show From the Earth surveyed the pottery of the West Coast craft movement started by Yvonne Rust in the 1970s, including work by Rust, Hardy Browning, Chris Weaver, and Bob McQuarrie.

The Left Bank for some years hosted the biennial New Zealand Pounamu/Jade Exhibition and competition, which began in 1984. Continued sponsorship by Air New Zealand allowed it to purchase the winners of the competition for its permanent collection. By the seventh national Pounamu Exhibition in 1998 the Left Bank was exhibiting the work of student carvers from Tai Poutini Polytechnic's jade-carving diploma, which had begun in 1995. The 11th national exhibition in January 2006 displayed 65 works, and the Premier Award winner was West Coast carver Paul Bradford.

== Collection ==
The permanent collection, a mixture of purchases and donations, includes works by Toss Wollaston, Allan Holcroft, Olivia Spencer-Bower, Yvonne Rust, Peter Hughson, Russell Beck, 1990 lithographs from Muka Studio, and contemporary pounamu. The collection began with a Toss Wollaston drawing, Erua, gifted by the artist in 1985. St Clair Sofield's watercolour South Tip Head was donated in August 1993, and a Stanley Palmer monoprint Abandoned Buses, Millerton in 1996. A Lotteries Commission grant at the beginning of 1995 allowed the gallery to build a temperature-controlled Conservation Room for its collection, at that point comprising 59 works valued at $50,000 (in 1996 dollars).

The gallery's national pounamu collection includes work by Paul Bradford and Russell Beck. The gallery was granted $15,000 in 1997 to create a display area for the collection, at that time comprising 19 pieces by 15 leading carvers. The entranceway, named Te Ara Poutini – Pathways of Greenstone, was carved from tōtara over June and July 1998 by Tony Manuel and Turi Gibb.

On 7 May 1999 a pounamu adze valued at $25,000, gifted to the gallery after being found in 1998 in 12 Mile Creek north of Greymouth, was stolen from a secured display case.

== Funding ==
The gallery initially ran as both a civic exhibition space and a selling gallery, to fund its operation. Its first director was Richard Arlidge. In 1993 it failed to secure a $45,000 operating grant from the Grey District Council, and applied for a $30,000 Lottery Community Development Grant to continue to support a director and two part-time workers. In 1994–95 the Grey District council supplied only $10,000 for the operating budget instead of the $50,000 requested. This was insufficient to employ a full-time director, so Arlidge resigned on 12 July 1994 and the gallery closed on Mondays. Don Smith took over as director. The Council reminded the Left Bank that it maintained the gallery's rent at just $10/week, and contributed around $20,000 a year when insurance, Mawhera Incorporation lease, and loss of rating were taken into account. In 1999, after receiving $14,250 for annual operations, the rent was doubled to $1000/year, and the Council again explained that it subsidised the gallery's maintenance ($7,500/year), Mawhera lease ($1020), insurance ($1000), and rates ($1000).

By 1997 Catherine Moffitt was the Left Bank's manager, and the gallery received a $15,000 operating grant. By 1998 Fiona Carruthers was the gallery curator, and Melanie Wilson and Adrienne Graham were employed as gallery assistants. In 2005 Wayne Lorimer was the gallery director; by 2006 it was Jane Darling. By the time of the gallery's re-opening after earthquake strengthening, WCSA chair Cassandra Struve was acting as Left Bank's coordinator.

The Left Bank Art Gallery is currently the only staffed public art gallery in the West Coast region, so exhibits work by artists from Karamea to Haast.
