= Christopher Weaver (disambiguation) =

Christopher Weaver is American entrepreneur, software developer and educator.

Christopher or Chris Weaver may also refer to:

- Chris Weaver (potter) (born 1956), New Zealand potter
- Chris Weaver Band, American country band headlining Chris Weaver
