= Alison Hale =

New Zealand artist

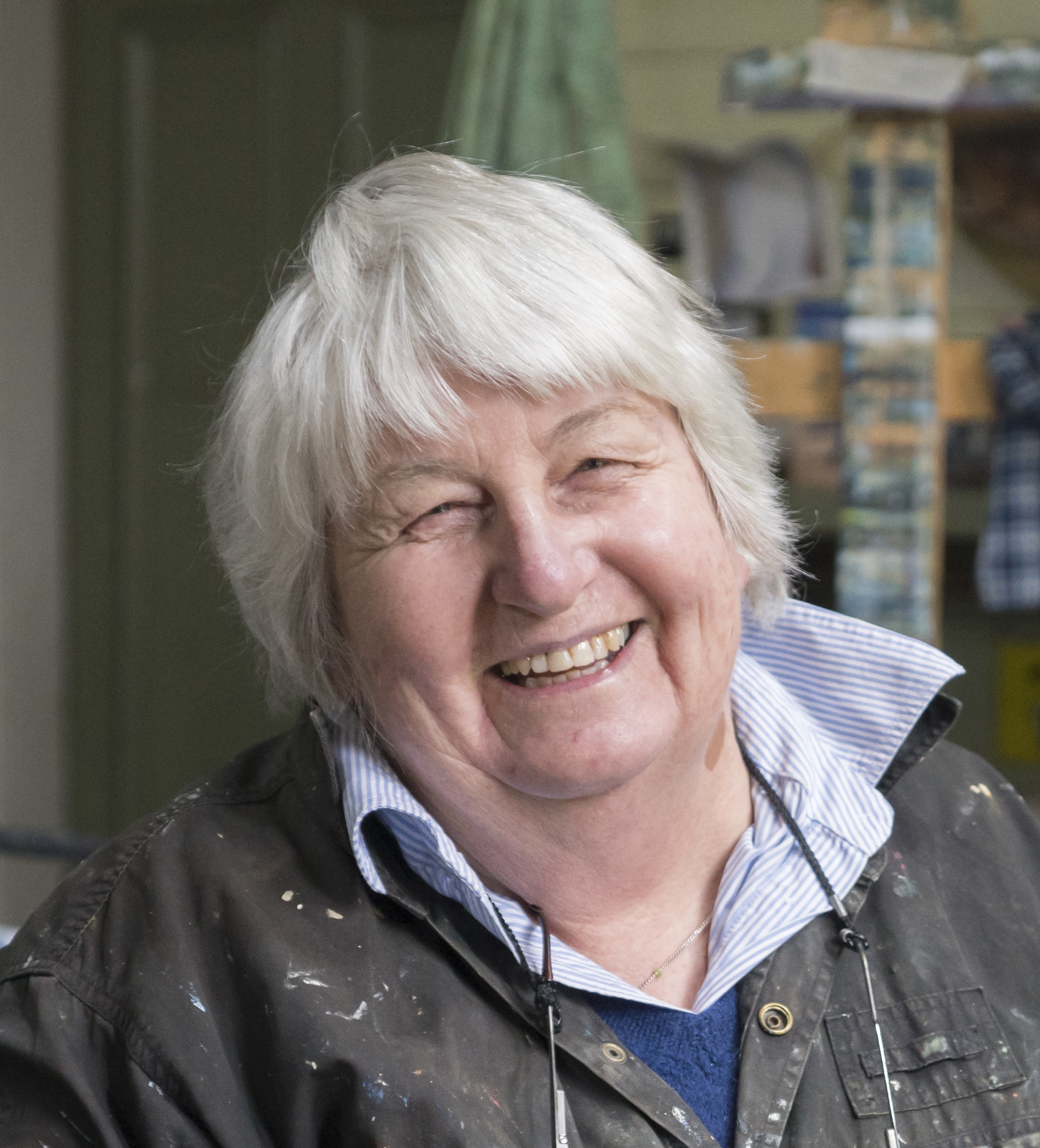
- Hale in her Reefton studio
- Born: 1955 (age 70–71); Westport, New Zealand
- Education: University of Otago
- Known for: Painter
- Website: alisonhale.co.nz

Alison Hale (born 1955) is a New Zealand artist, based in Reefton, known for her depictions of horses and the natural environment.

== Early life ==
The youngest of six children, Hale was born and grew up in Westport, on the banks on the Buller River. Horses are a recurring theme in her work, and she was fascinated by them from an early age: "I'd failed miserably at school because I was too busy riding horses!" She recalls as a child catching loose horses in Westport and returning them to their owners so she could get a ride, and biking out to the light horse club with jodhpurs she bought with whitebaiting money. Hale dropped out of school at 15, met a farrier, and went on to have three children with him. At 16 she was working at the Brackenfield Hunt Club in Canterbury, exercising hunt horses, and a year later moved to Māwheraiti with her husband to train horses. She raised her family working in shearing sheds, relief milking, mustering, and general farm work. She continued to ride, competing in showjumping and other equine events.

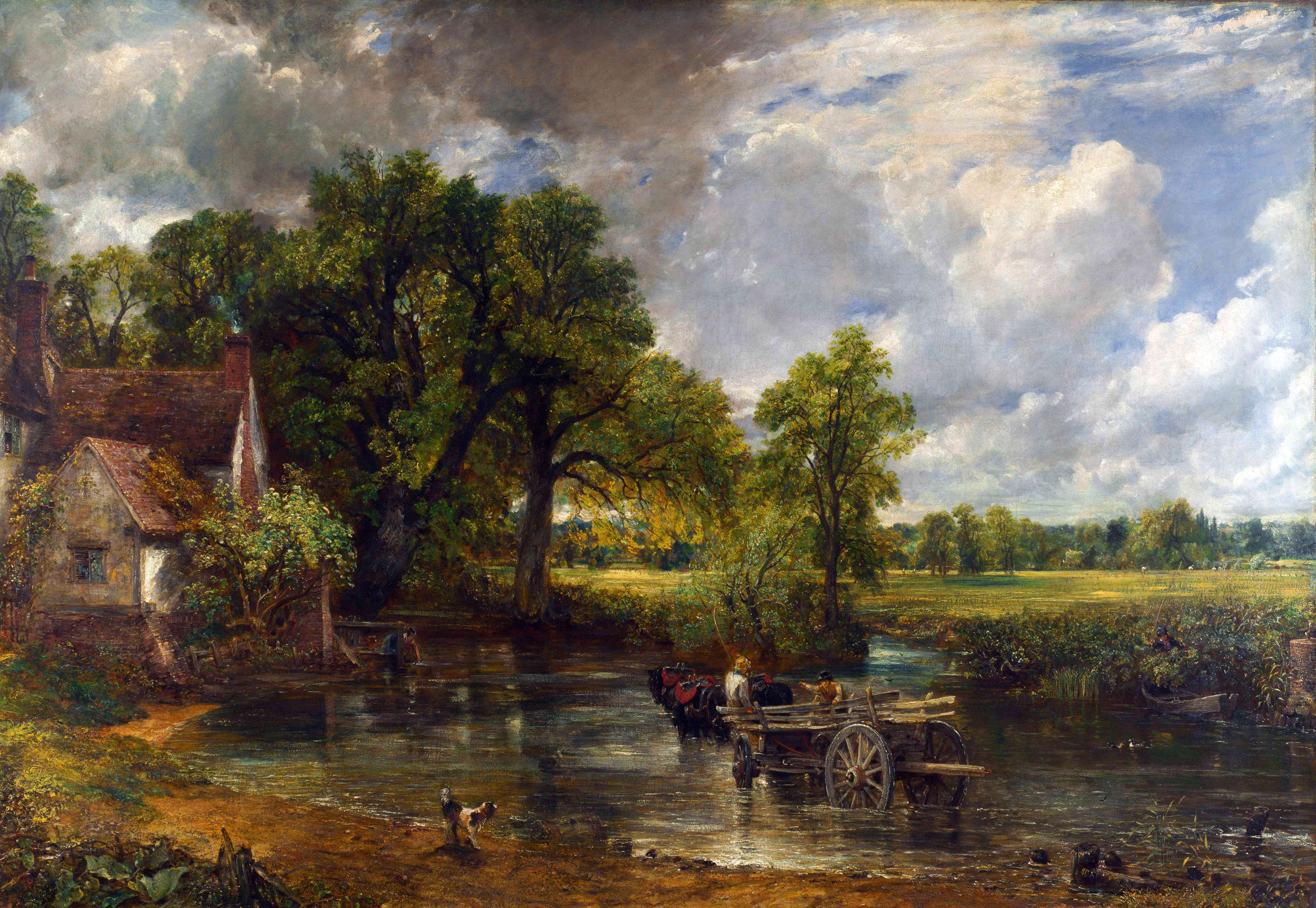
An inspiration for Hale was John Constable's The Hay Wain (1821)

Hale had drawn from an early age, but failed School Certificate art, even though "it's the only class I ever behaved in at school"; she nevertheless continued drawing after marrying, and began painting with watercolours when her children started school. Her inspiration to begin working in oils came from seeing a reproduction of Constable's The Hay Wain at age 18, in a house the couple had moved into. One of the most important influences in her early artistic career was Hokitika landscape painter Brent Trolle, whose weekend Rural Education Programme painting course she attended, and who encouraged her to continue.

== Artistic career ==
In 1992, Hale, then Alison Parker, completed a foundation art history course at Tai Poutini Polytechnic under Evelyn Hewlett, where she was awarded the Fletcher Challenge Scholarship for general excellence. That same year she was able to pass bursary art history in an evening class run by Warren Feeney, then a Greymouth High School art teacher.

With the encouragement of her tutors, she put together a portfolio and in 1993 moved to Dunedin at the age of 38 to study for a Bachelor of Fine Arts at the University of Otago, majoring in painting. She had to leave two of her children back on the West Coast, only seeing them on weekends. In 1995 she was one of two recipients of the Derivan-Art Spectrum Painting Award. She began depicting horses in her art in her third year of her degree, initially hiding her work from her tutor, who said, "If that is where your heart is, paint it.", something she describes as the most valuable advice anybody had ever given her. Horses have remained a major theme in her work ever since: "Working with horses has been an extremely dominant part of my life both physically and emotionally."

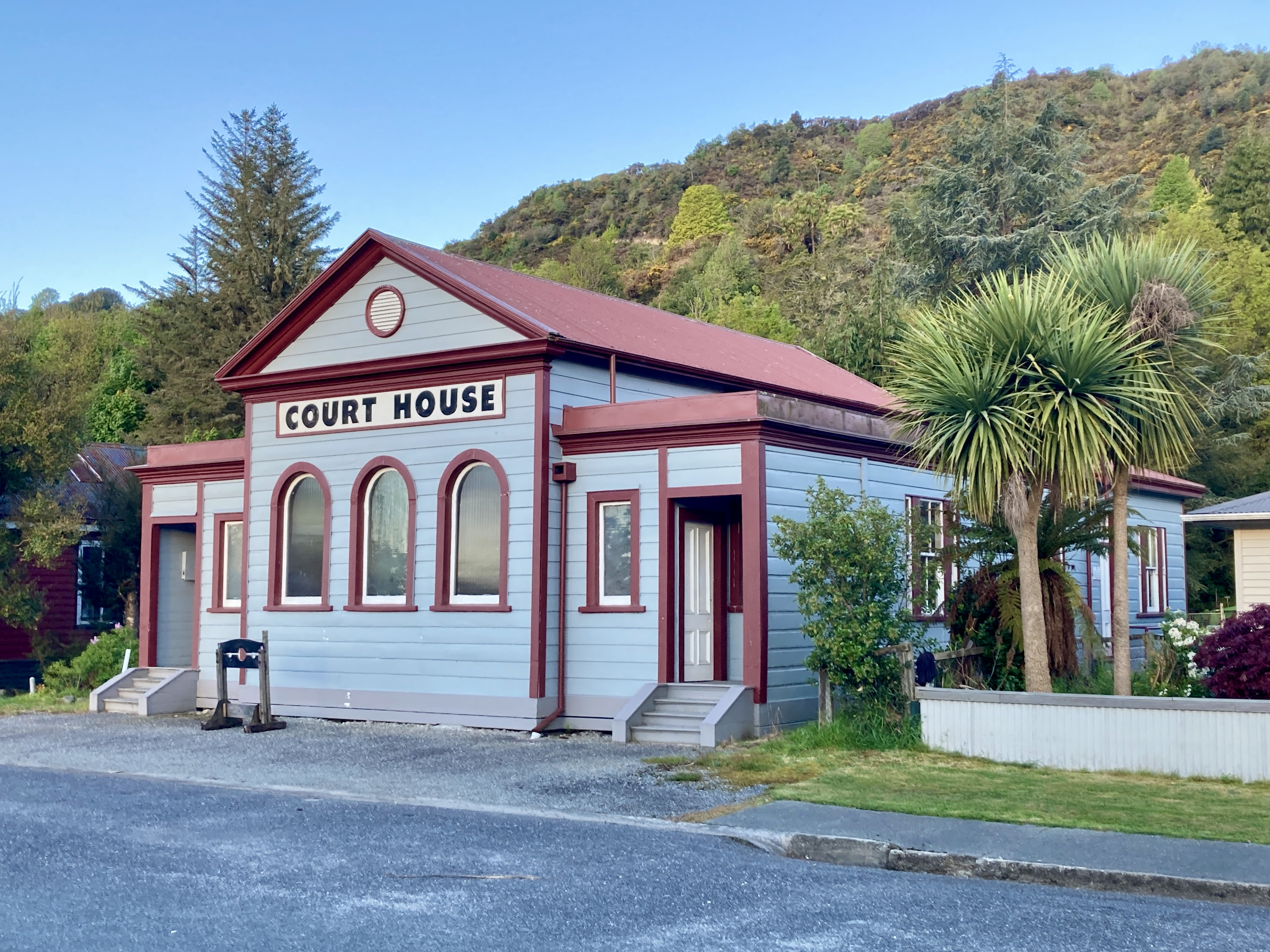
Reefton Courthouse building

On graduating at the end of 1996 Hale moved to Reefton and became a professional artist. In 1998 she opened the Reefton Gallery on Broadway. In November 2010 she was one of a group of five artists (Ruth Vaega, Charley Gray, Michelle Green, and Keith Wills) who opened the Smallbone and Storekeeper galleries on Broadway, named after a former wine and spirit shop. Shared by several artists, the Hale Gallery adjoins the Reefton Gallery.

After working in a studio at the back of the gallery, she moved to the 1873 former Reefton Courthouse building on Bridge Street. This Category I historic courthouse, closed in the early 1970s, had been suffering from leaks and a sinking floor, and was restored with a $103,000 grant in 2000. Hale is part of the artist co-operative the Reefton Design Studio, along with Rachel Fifield, Princess Hart, Sue Bevan, Jean Davison, and Carol Jones, who are attempting to create a space where tourists and locals can watch artists at work.

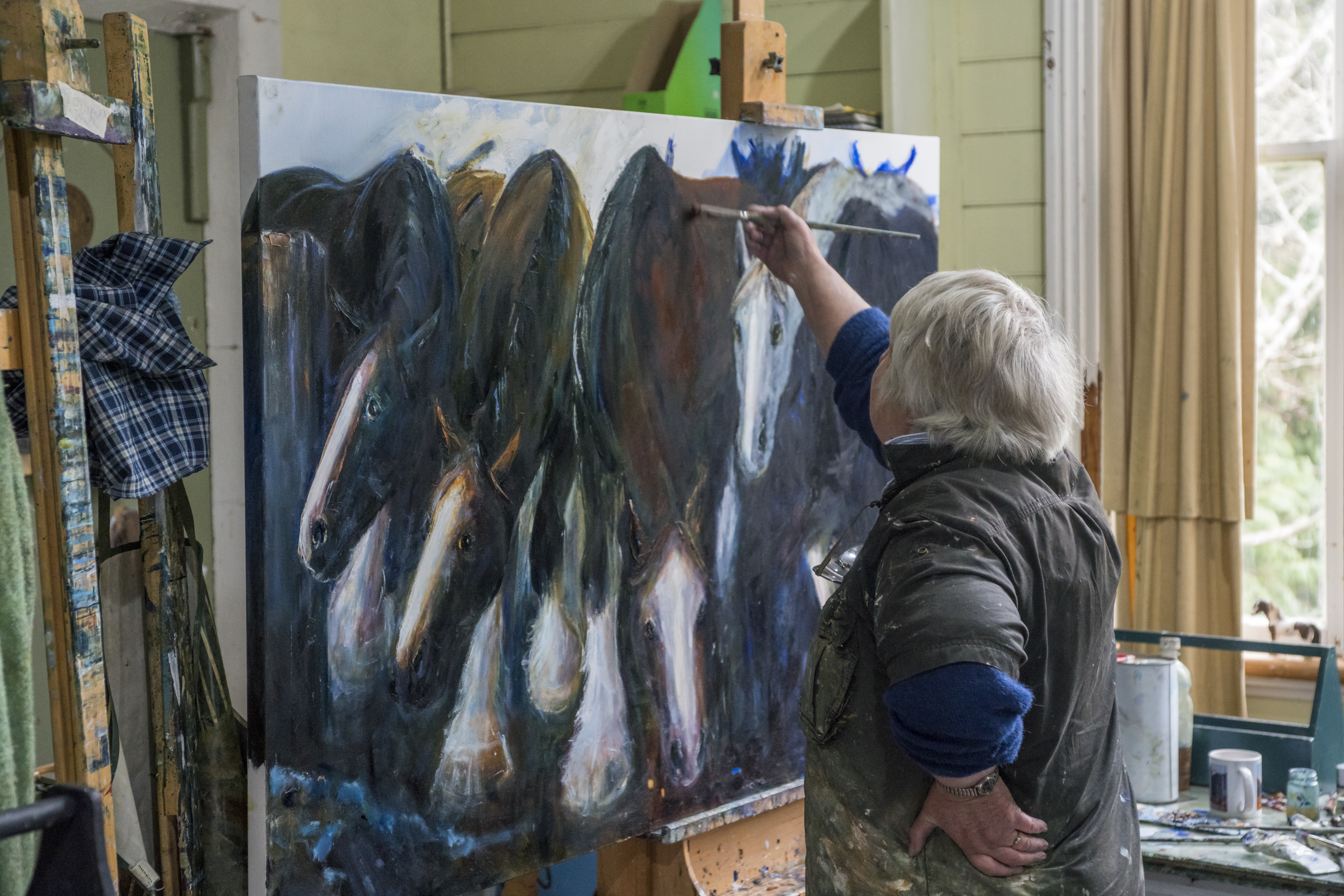
Hale painting in her studio

Hales work often features strong, vibrant images of horses, pioneer men and women, and cattle; the horses in many of her paintings have exaggerated legs, "to create the lengthening feel I love when I ride". She has also painted landscapes of the West Coast and Central Otago. Her favourite artists include Susan Rothenberg and Andrew Wyeth.

Another series depicts native freshwater fishes in their natural habitat, and her concern for their survival. Hale began this series in 2006, after meeting Irish artist Barrie Cooke trout fishing on the Inangahua River near Reefton; she was working on a series of trout paintings at the time, and after the meeting began painting the five whitebait species of the Buller River: īnanga, koaro, and banded, shortjaw, and giant kōkopu. These paintings were exhibited in a joint show, Where Rivers Meet, in the Wearable Arts Museum, Nelson, in 2006, and at the Left Bank Art Gallery, Greymouth, in 2007.

Hale began her career working in oils on canvas or hardwood, occasionally painting in acrylic. Over time she increasingly began painting with oils on glass, making a reversed glass image. She works from imagined images rather than reference photographs, and does not plan compositions in advance.

Hale's painting Nineteen Nineteen, depicting a nine-year-old on trial at the Reefton Courthouse in 1919, won the legal section of the Carruthers and Wetherall Art Awards in Greymouth in 1997. She has twice won first prize in the West Coast and Buller section of the Telecom White Pages Art Award, in 1998 and 2006; her paintings Coming Down from the Clarke and The Biggest Catch of All graced the covers of the telephone books for those years.

== Awards ==
- 2006 Telecom White Pages Art Award, West Coast/Buller.
- 2002, 2001 Hadley & Robinson Art Award, Otago Art Society: first prize.
- 2001 Maurice Kerr Award from the 125th Annual Exhibition of the Otago Art Society: first prize for Passing By No. 2.
- 1998 Tauranga Trustpower National Art Award: winner, open section.
- 1998 Telecom White Pages Art Award, West Coast.
- 1997 Carruthers and Wetherall Art Awards, Greymouth: winner, legal theme.
- 1996 Cleveland Art Awards, Dunedin: student award.

== Selected exhibitions ==
- Recollections. Dec 2014–Jan 2015. Carnegie Gallery, Hokitika
- Tribute to the Pioneer Women of the West Coast. 2013. Hale Gallery, Reefton.
- Above and Below the Surface. 2008. Group exhibition at COCA Gallery, Christchurch.
- Sustainability. 2007. Left Bank Art Gallery, Greymouth.
- Out of the Rain. Jan–Feb 2007 (Left Bank Art Gallery), March 2007 (COCA)
- Cattle, Bait and Horses. March–April 2007. Art on Hart Gallery, Blackball.
- Where Rivers Meet. 2006. Reflections Gallery, World of Wearable Art Museum, Nelson.
- Recent Works. May–June 2001. Left Bank Art Gallery, Greymouth.
