= Marilyn Rea-Menzies =

New Zealand artist (born 1944)

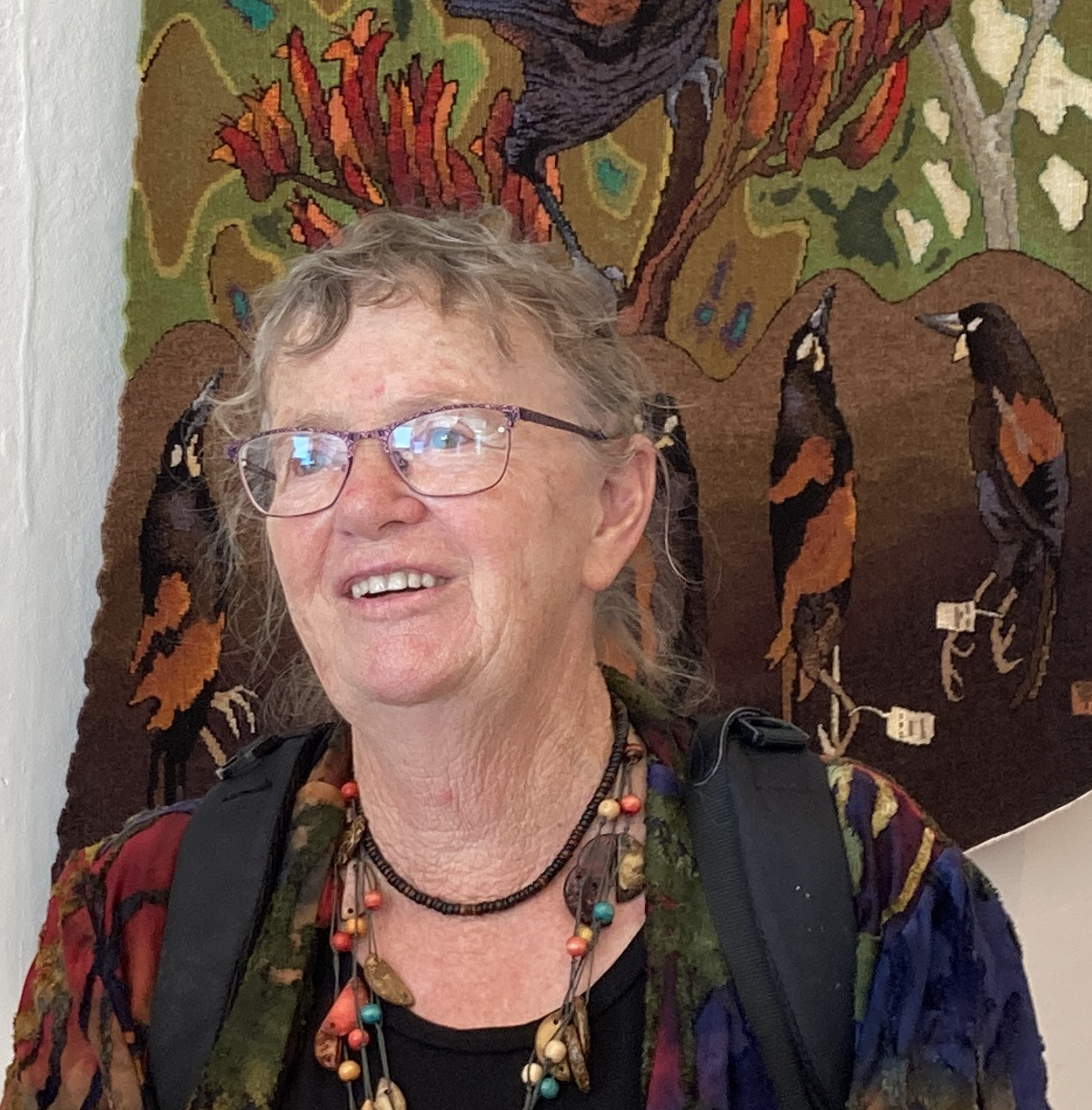
- Rea-Menzies in 2021
- Born: 1 February 1944 (age 82); Westport, New Zealand
- Known for: Tapestry weaving
- Website: www.tapestry.co.nz

Marilyn Rea-Menzies (born 1 February 1944) is a New Zealand artist, principally known for her tapestry work, but who also exhibits drawing, painting, and digital print. She is considered one of New Zealand's leading textile artists.

== Life ==
Rea-Menzies was born in Westport on the West Coast of the South Island on 1 February 1944, the eldest of nine children. Her grandparents had arrived in Westport in 1920, and her parents Meg (née Eddy) and Alan Rea ran the O'Conor Home Farm from 1947, first on McKenna Road, and then from 1952 at Nine Mile Road. Marilyn had what she describes as a rural Irish Catholic upbringing, doing farm chores, helping with the milking, and riding horses. She was educated at St Mary's College in Westport, where her teacher Sister Christopher encouraged her artistic skills, to the point of her passing the preliminary exam for the Diploma of Fine Arts. Instead of attending art school, she moved to Christchurch at the age of 17 to train as a primary school teacher at Christchurch Teachers' College from 1961 to 1962.

Rea-Menzies then moved back to the West Coast and had a brief teaching career before marrying David Menzies in January 1965. After a short stint in Wellington and the birth of their first child, the couple returned to Westport, where her husband managed the Buller Valley Dairy Company until its closure in 1971. The family then moved to the North Island, where David Menzies had a series of dairy factory management jobs in Te Puke, Wairoa, and finally Tauranga.

Rea-Menzies lived in Tauranga and nearby Mount Maunganui until 1990. When she separated from her husband in December 1985 she resolved to begin an artistic career. At this time she was running a weaving supply business and had founded an artist co-operative, Viewpoint Studio. She returned to the South Island in November 1990, to set up Glenora Craft and the International Weavers' School in Picton, where she spent nearly four years. Rea-Menzies moved to Christchurch in 1994, initially working from home; with the help of an Arts Council grant she established a public studio in the Christchurch Arts Centre, the Christchurch Tapestry Workshop, in mid-1998, which she operated almost seven days a week. Visitors occasionally commissioned works from her after visiting the studio; Rea-Menzies would invite them to do some of the weaving themselves, and to cut the tapestry from the loom when it was finished. She stayed in the Arts Centre until the 2011 Christchurch earthquake, when the damaged building was closed for repair.

Following the 2011 earthquake and her studio closure, Rea-Menzies eventually moved to Hamilton, where four of her five children lived, and remained there for six years. During this time she sold some paintings (but no tapestries), and taught weaving and drawing. Gradually her children began to move away from the Waikato, so in 2019 she returned to Westport to set up a studio, gallery, and teaching space.

== Artistic career ==
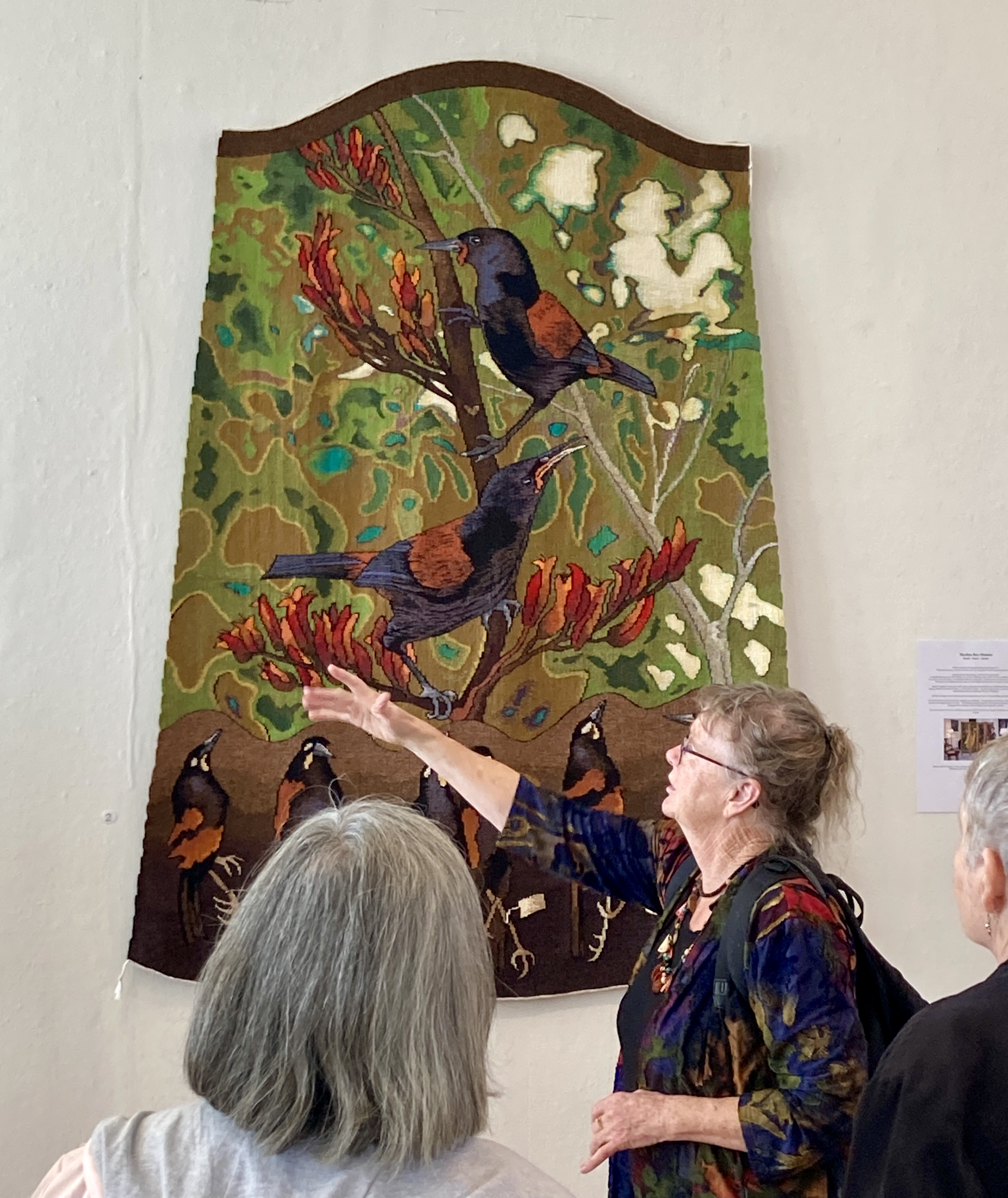
Marilyn Rea-Menzies in front of Tieke (Saddleback) in her 2021 show Extinction is Forever, at the Left Bank Art Gallery in Greymouth

Rea-Menzies painted and drew from the age of 10, and joined local art groups to keep in practice while her children were growing up. In the 1970s, influenced by Robert Kaupelis' book Experimental Drawing, she started applying grids and distortions to her paintings, which later appeared in her tapestries. She was also strongly influenced by seeing Colin McCahon's painting On Building Bridges around 1977 in the Auckland Art Gallery. In 1980, while living in Tauranga, Rea-Menzies taught herself to weave tapestries – she had a small weaving frame constructed and learned the techniques from a library book. Within a year she had won her first award, at the Bay of Plenty Woolcraft Festival.

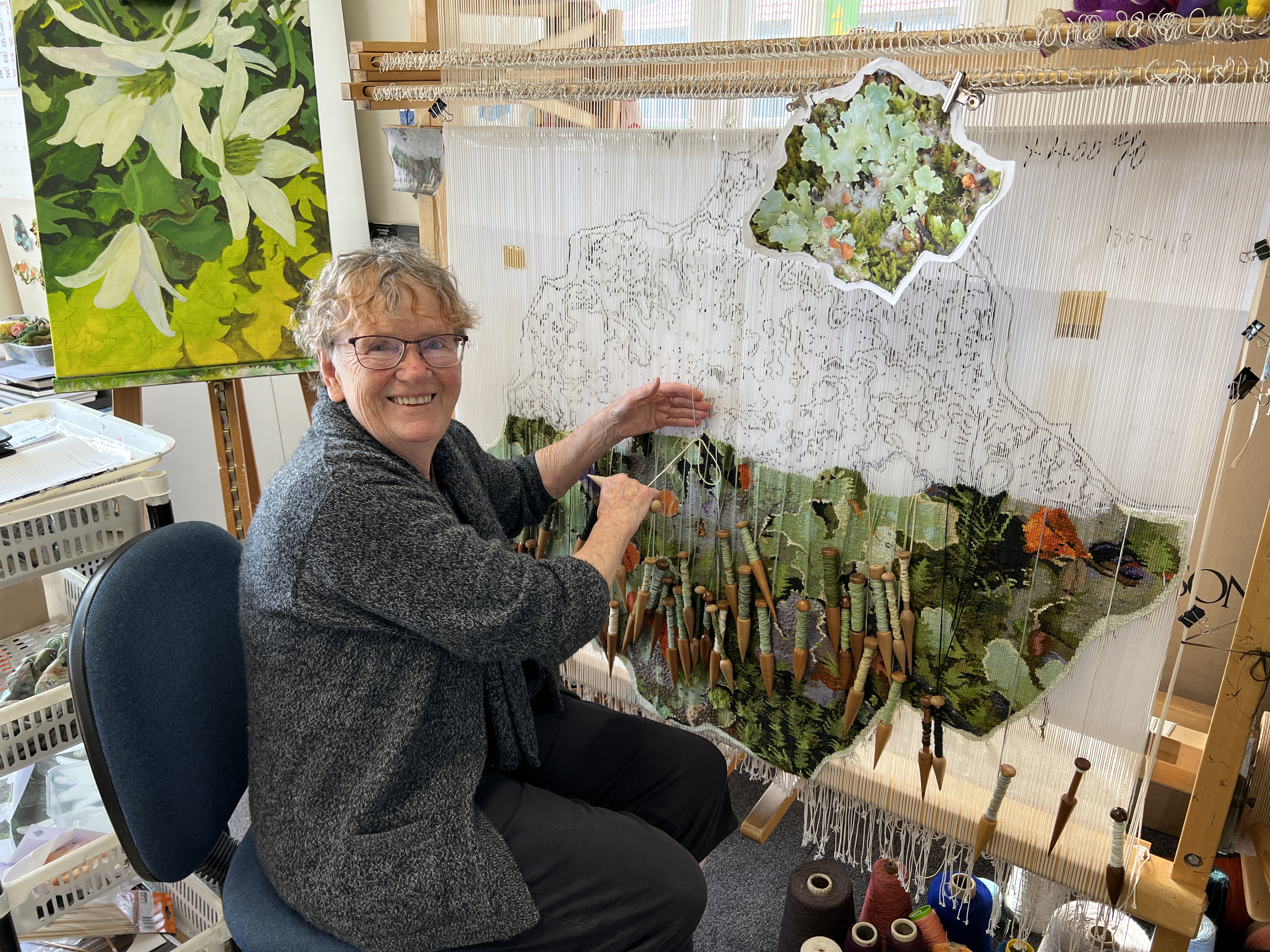
Rea-Menzies in her home studio in Westport

Rea-Menzies has been working professionally as full-time artist since the early 1990s. One the few professional tapestry weavers in New Zealand, and the only one creating large-scale works, she is considered one of New Zealand's leading textile artists and teachers.

Rea-Menzies' early work was inspired by the New Zealand landscape, including a water/sea/sky series woven from 1984 to 1986. Her response to the enfolding nature of the West Coast landscape has been compared to that of the West Coast artists Sue Syme and Catherine Brough. Rea-Menzies has been influenced by Colin McCahon, Louise Henderson, and John Weeks, and international artists Chuck Close, Jasper Johns, Robert Rauschenberg, and David Hockney. She has said: "The architectural process of building the tapestry, actually constructing the fabric and image together so that the two are physically and visually inseparable, relates very strongly to the process of constructing and building our lives."

Rea-Menzies' larger tapestry works are intricately woven and can take months or years to produce. "It takes me a day to weave a 30 cm square on a plain piece, and up to four days for a more complex design." Although principally known for her tapestries, Rea-Menzies has regularly exhibited photography and drawing; all three media were part of her 2008 show Underfoot at the Centre of Contemporary Art (CoCA) in Christchurch. She also exhibits paintings and digital designs.

== Significant works ==
- Spiral with Cross (1983), which was installed in the refurbished St Canice's Church, Westport.
- Baycourt Tapestries (1983–85) with Jill Kobayashi; these cover the back wall of Tauranga's Miles-Warren-designed Baycourt Community and Arts Centre.
- Jesus at the Mount (1987), a commissioned work for Mount Maunganui's St Thomas More Church.
- Women of Marlborough (1994), commissioned by the Women's Suffrage Committee in Marlborough and depicting a history of women in the region, now on display in the Marlborough District Council offices; it took five months to complete.
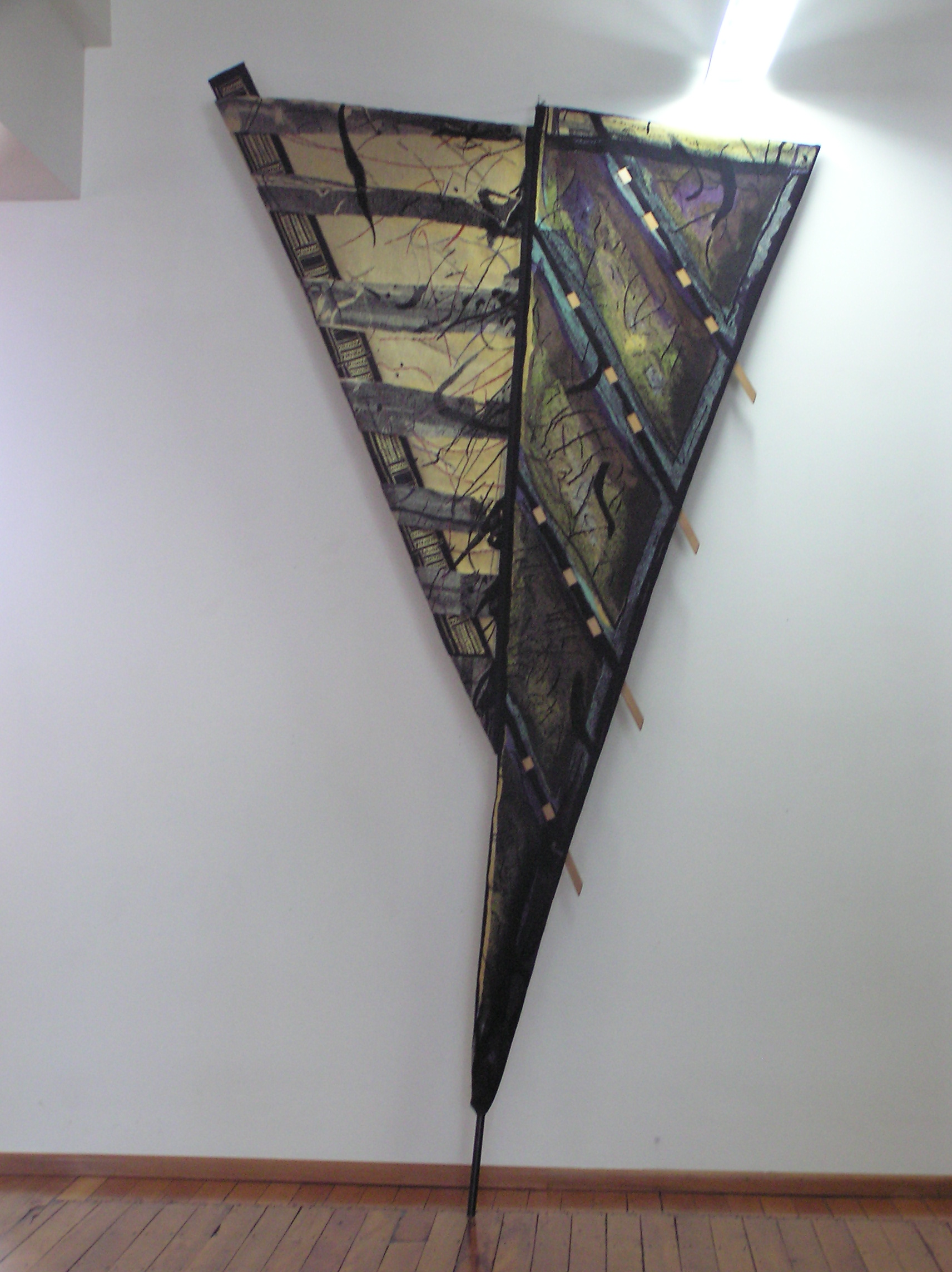
- A Matter of Degrees (collaboration with Graham Bennett)
  From 1995, Rea-Menzies worked with nine other artists to make a series of Collaborative Tapestries from their designs, culminating in the 2005 show Primary Connections at the Mair Gallery in CoCA. Her first collaboration was Living in the South Pacific with Christchurch printmaker Michael Reed. She worked with sculptor Graham Bennett on A Matter of Degrees, a three-part piece mounted on a stainless-steel framework. Other collaborators were Michael Armstrong, Rudolf Boelee, William Cumming, Don Driver, Julia Morison, and Paul Johns.
- In 1999, Rea-Menzies was commissioned to create a tapestry to mark the millennium celebrations in Christchurch. The concept design competition for the Tapestry 2000 project was won by artist Philip Trusttum, who collaborated with Rea-Menzies to determine yarns and colours (she changed the background colour from white to dark green) and create a 5 m by 3 m cartoon to be placed behind the warp threads. This was Rea-Menzies' second collaborative tapestry. Creating it took 18 months, from April 1999 to September 2000, and incorporated the contributions of almost 3000 people: weavers, weaving groups, and members of the public. Each participant, under the supervision of Rea-Menzies and her assistant Alison Stanton, created a small section of the final work. While the work was under construction, Chelsea Clinton visited Rea-Menzies in her Arts Centre studio while President Bill Clinton was making a public visit to Christchurch, and contributed some weaving to the tapestry. The Millennium Tapestry is Rea-Menzies' largest work, at 15 square metres, and required a custom-made loom built by her brother Jim Rea. The Prime Minister Helen Clark helped cut the tapestry free from its frame, and it was unveiled in CoCA on 23 October 2000. Initially installed in the Christchurch Town Hall, it is now on display in the Christchurch City Council chambers on Hereford Street.
- In 2011, Rea-Menzies was commissioned by Lady Susan Satyanand, the wife of Anand Satyanand the Governor General of New Zealand, to make a double-sided screen for Government House in Wellington. The screen, with a pattern of kōwhai flowers, was a gift to mark the end of the Governor General's tenure.
- The small 2015 tapestry Doll won the 2015 Kate Derum Award, an international competition run biennially by the Australian Tapestry Workshop, from a shortlist of 41.
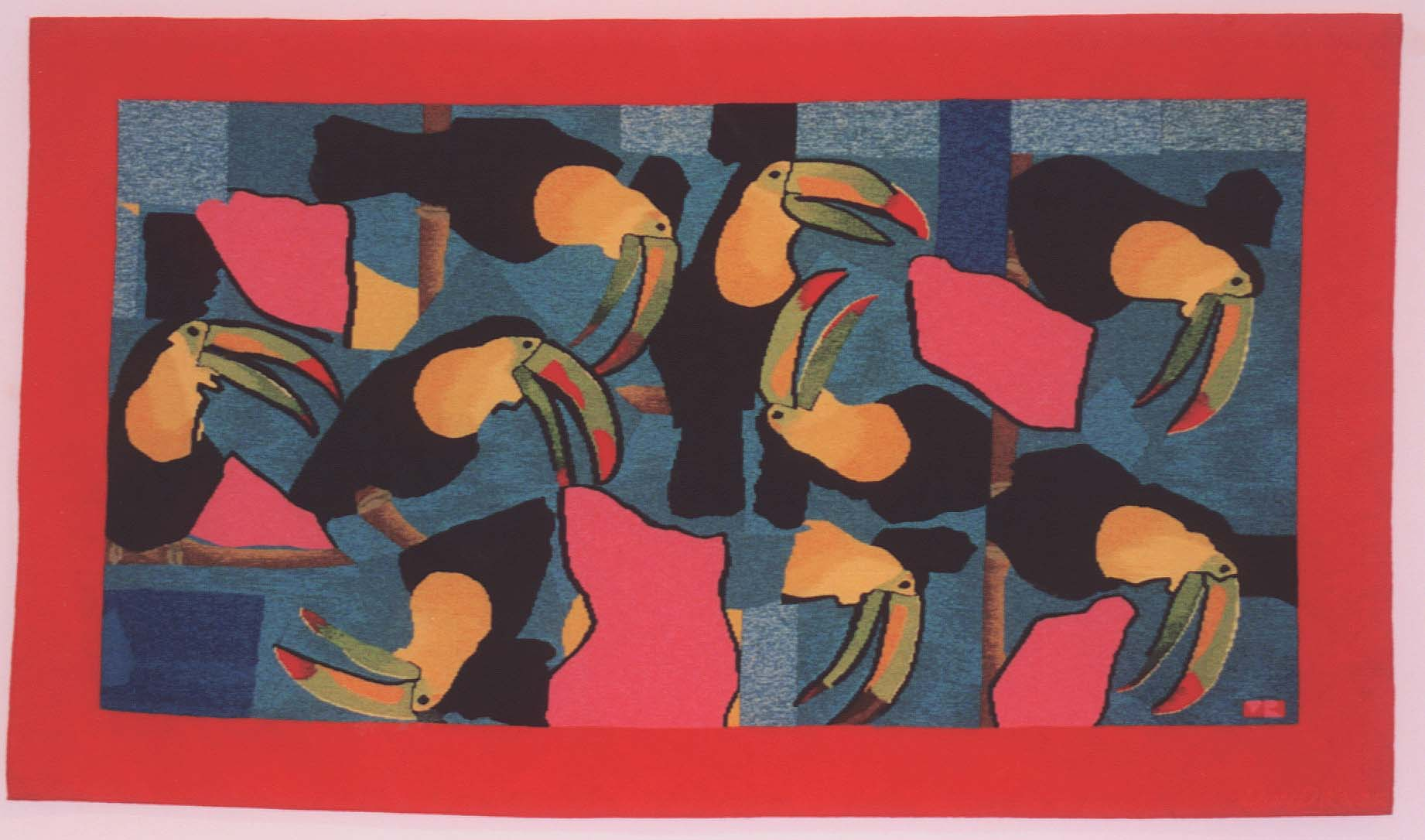
Song (2000–2001), a collaboration with Don Driver

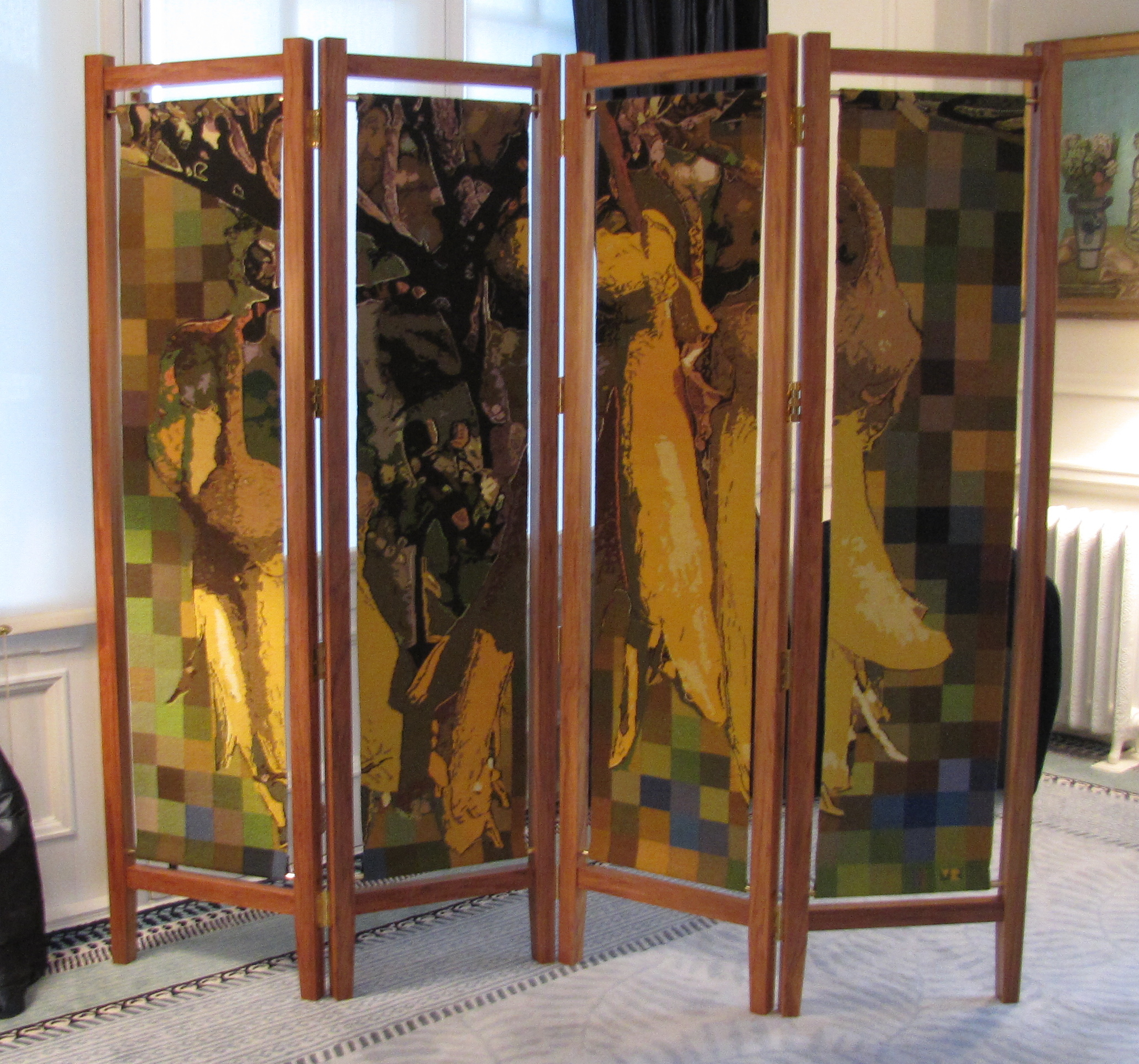
Government House tapestry screen (2011)

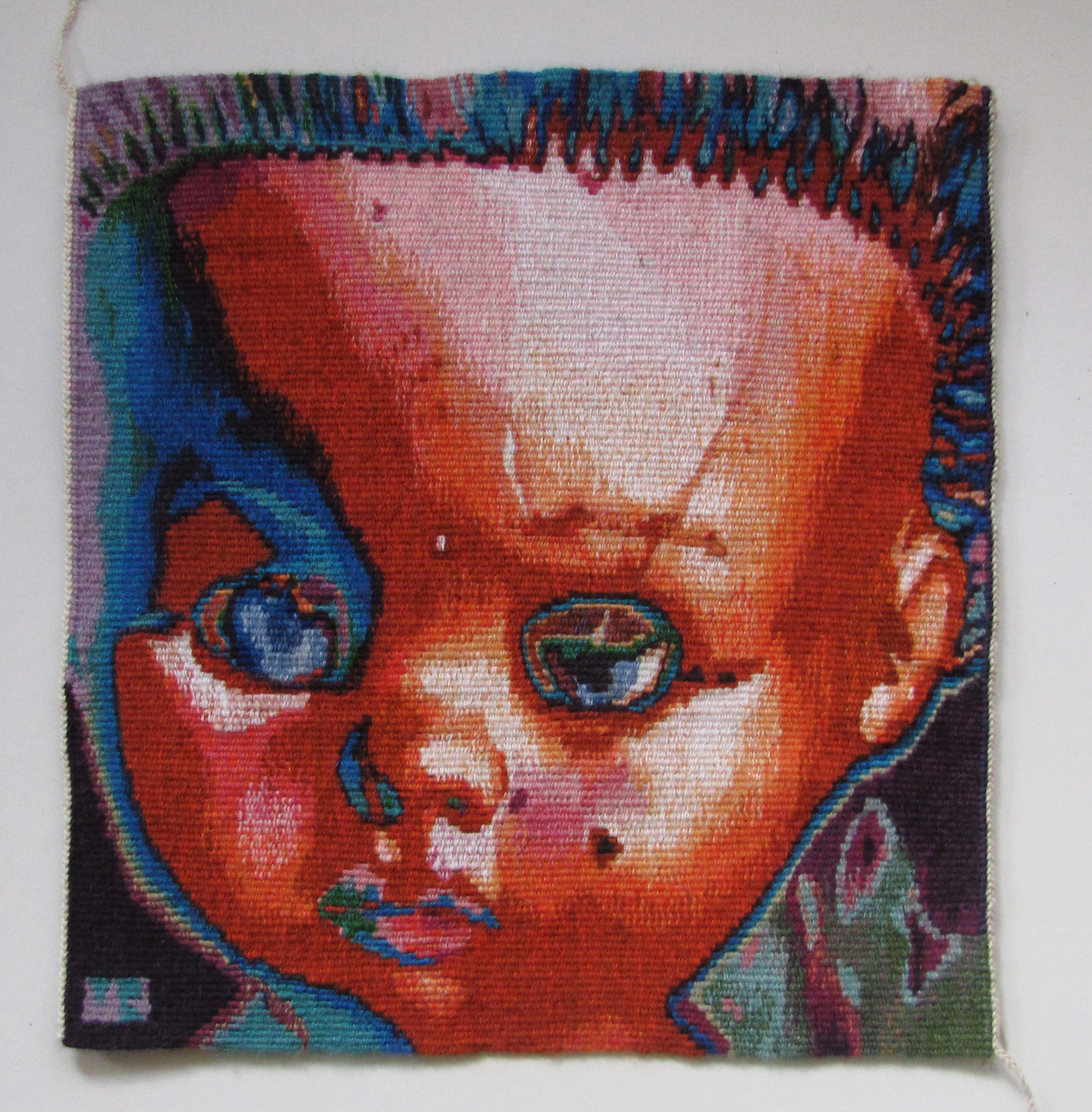
Doll (2015)

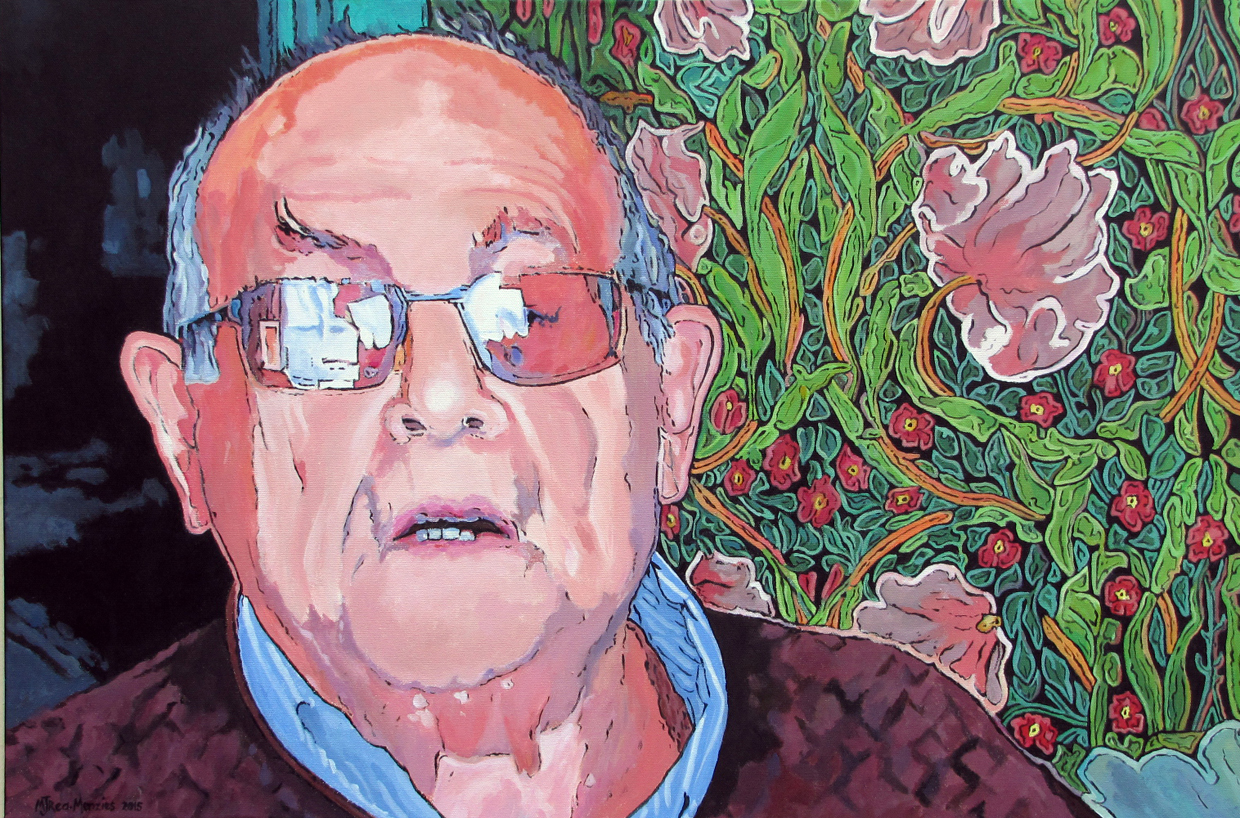
Barry Hopkins (2015), acrylic on canvas

== Collections ==
- Rea-Menzies work has been commissioned by the Ministry of Foreign Affairs and Trade for display in New Zealand embassies around the world, starting with her early work Green Landscape (1985).
- A small 2003 work Order and Chaos is in the permanent collection of the Musée Jean Lurçat et de la Tapisserie contemporaine in Angers.
- Two of her collaborative works (Song, with Don Driver, and Raiment, with Julia Morison) were purchased in 2003 by the Christchurch Art Gallery.
- One of Rea-Menzies' earliest tapestries, Landscape Series No 2 (1980), was purchased by Auckland Library in 1981 and is now in collection of the Auckland War Memorial Museum.
- An acrylic-on-canvas portrait of the late Barry Hopkins is in the collection of Waikato Museum Te Whare Taonga o Waikato, of which he was a patron.
- The Left Bank Art Gallery owns the charcoal and watercolour on paper work Poison Kills.

== Solo shows ==
- Just Faces. February 1997: Salamander Gallery, Christchurch.
- Nature's Way: an exploration. September 2014: ArtsPost, Hamilton; 2016: Paeroa Arts Society, Paeroa.
- Extinction is Forever. October 2018: Wallace Gallery, Morrinsville; 1 February – 15 March 2020: Arts in Oxford Gallery, Oxford; 5 February – 21 March 2021: Pātaka, Porirua. Its 75 works included tapestries, charcoal and pastel on paper, and watercolour paintings of endangered plants and animals. The three largest tapestries, in the form of cloaks, depicted endangered New Zealand birds: Kokako, Tieke (Saddleback) and Hihi (Stitchbird). Three pastel works, Protect Our Forest, were added in 2019 following her return to Westport.
Extinction is Forever

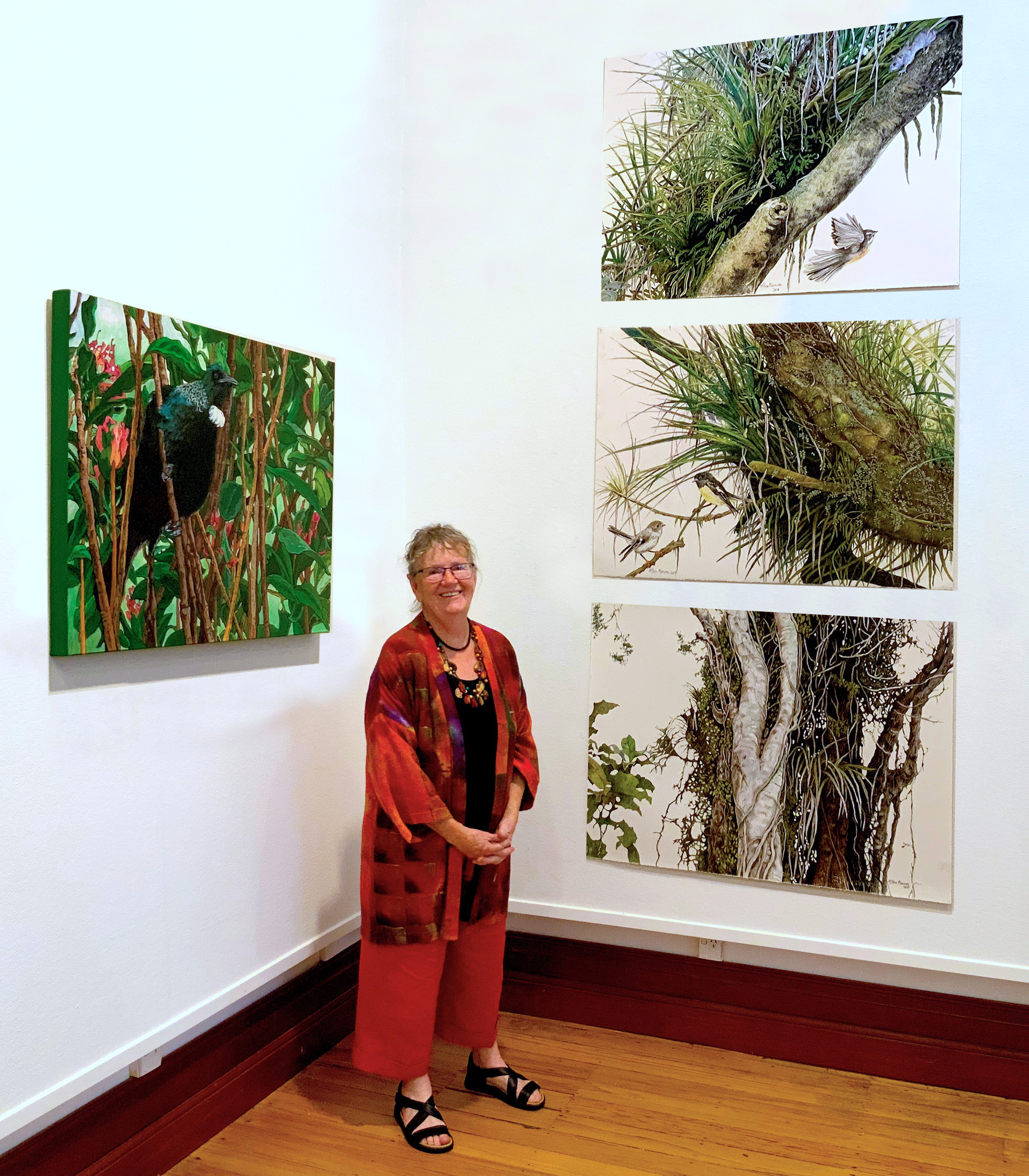

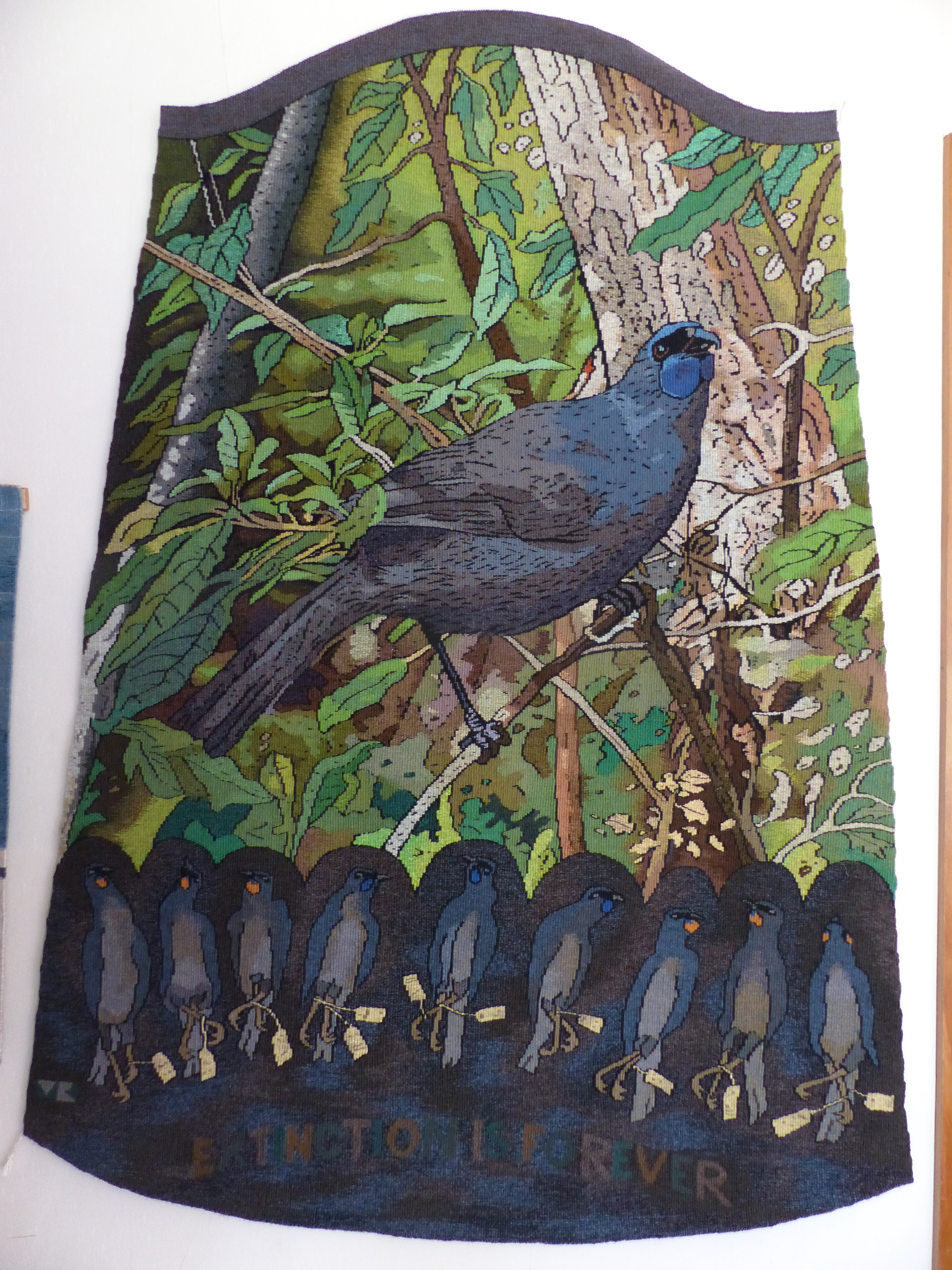
Kokako (2015)

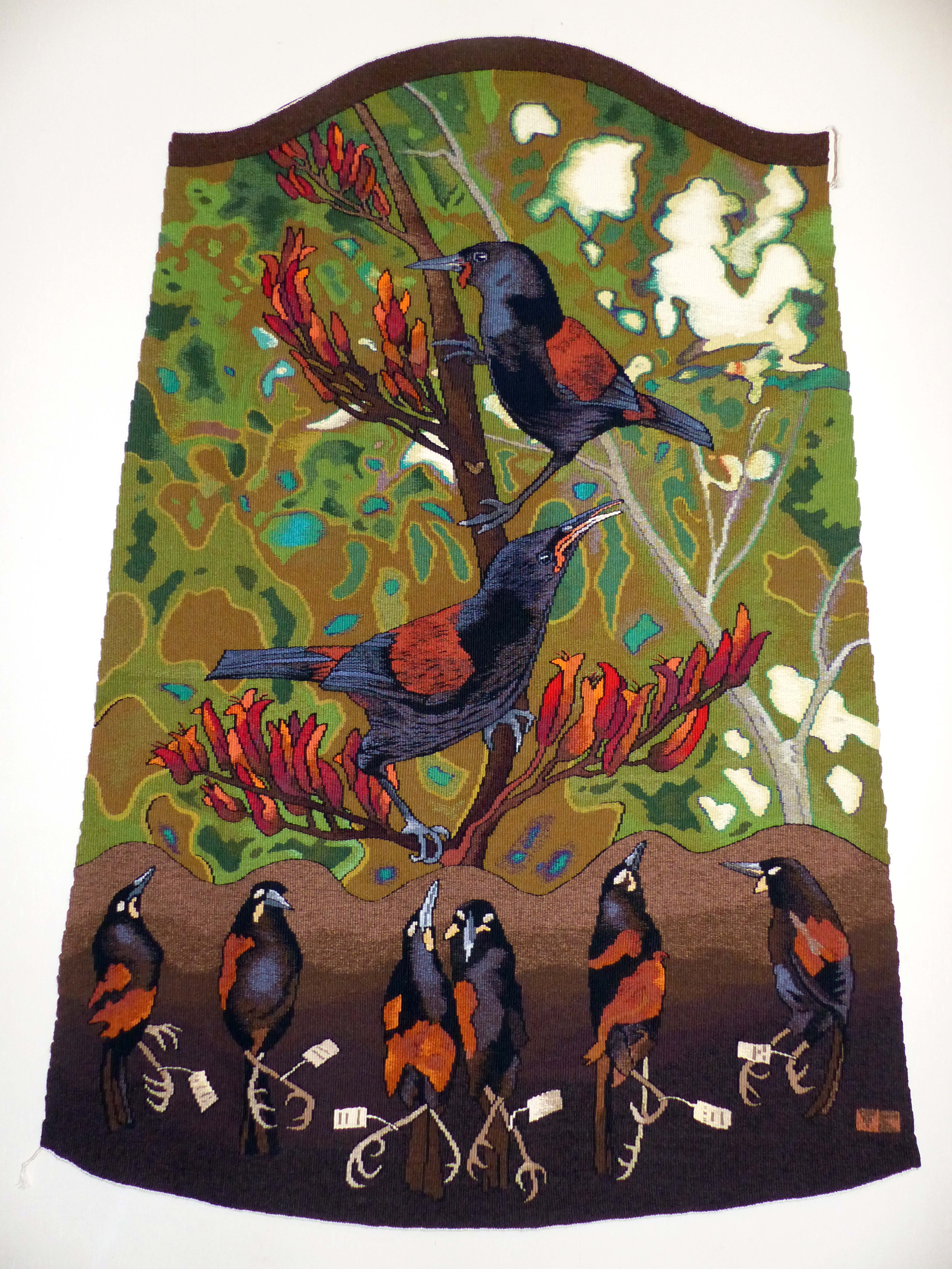
Tieke (Saddleback) (2016)

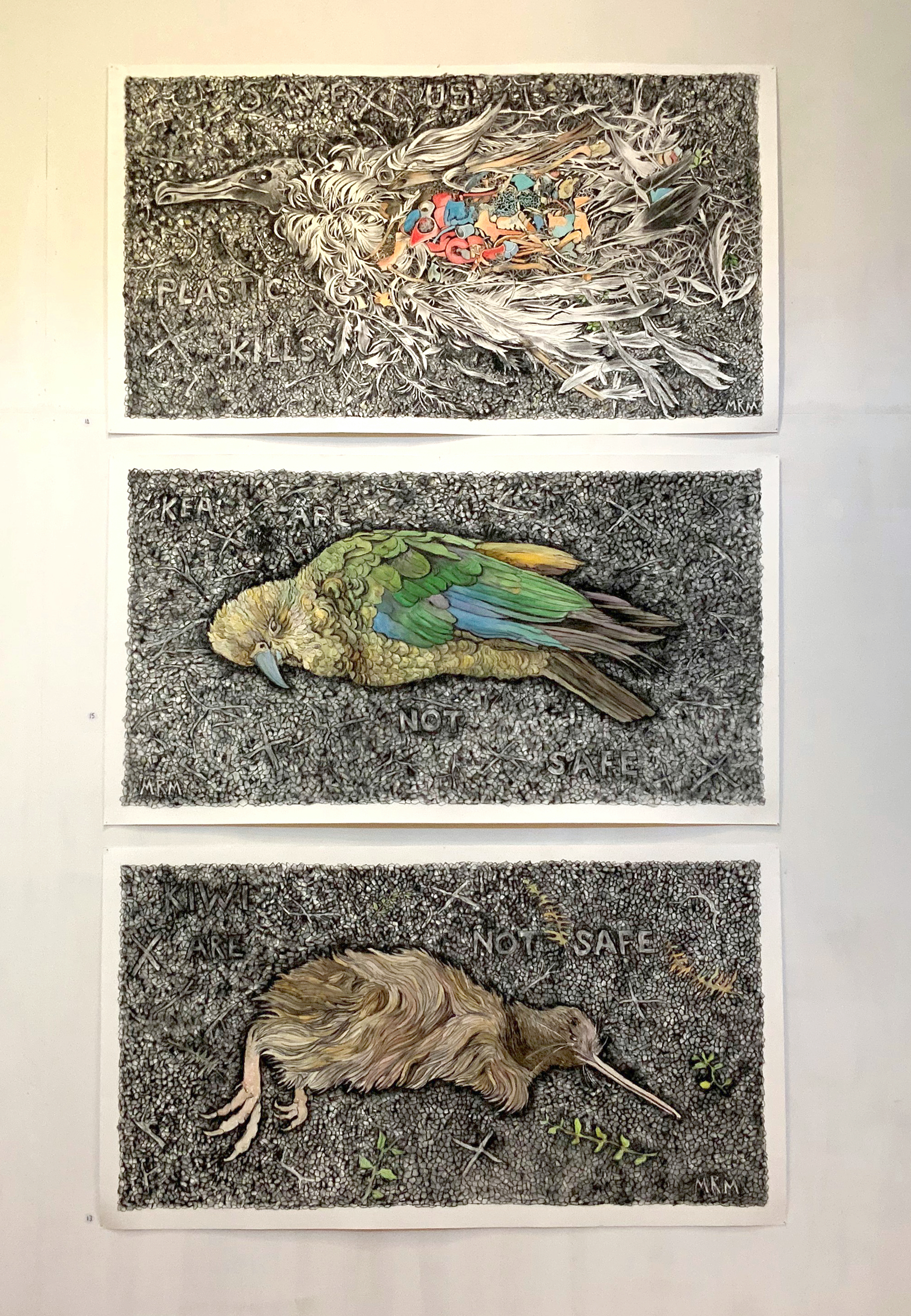

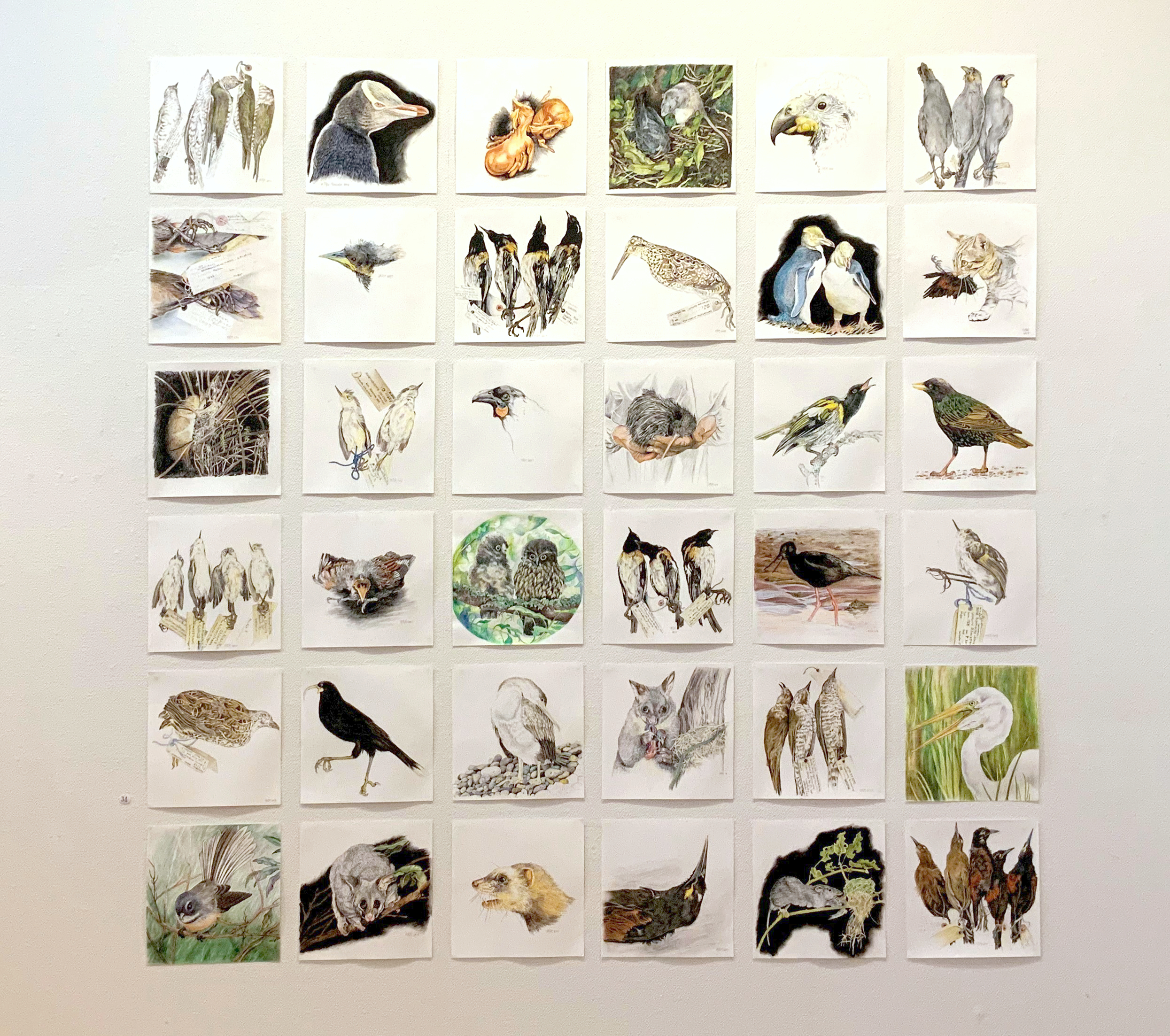
