= Dusty Rhodes (artist) =

New Zealand artist (1891–1979)

- Born: James Francis Rhodes; 8 May 1891; Christchurch, New Zealand
- Died: 3 May 1979 (aged 87); Greymouth, New Zealand
- Education: Canterbury College School of Art
- Occupation: Hairdresser
- Known for: Painting
- Spouse: Edith Grace Wilton (m. 1922; died 1969)
- Children: 4

James Francis "Dusty" Rhodes (8 May 1891 – 3 May 1979) was a hairdresser and prolific amateur artist who lived in Greymouth, New Zealand.

== Early life and family ==
Born in Christchurch on 8 May 1891, James Rhodes went to Christ's College before attending the Canterbury College School of Art. He moved to Wellington briefly before returning to Christchurch to work as a hairdresser. In November 1915, he was drafted into the army Ambulance Corps and sent to the Western Front in 1917. He returned badly wounded and suffering from the after-effects of mustard gas.

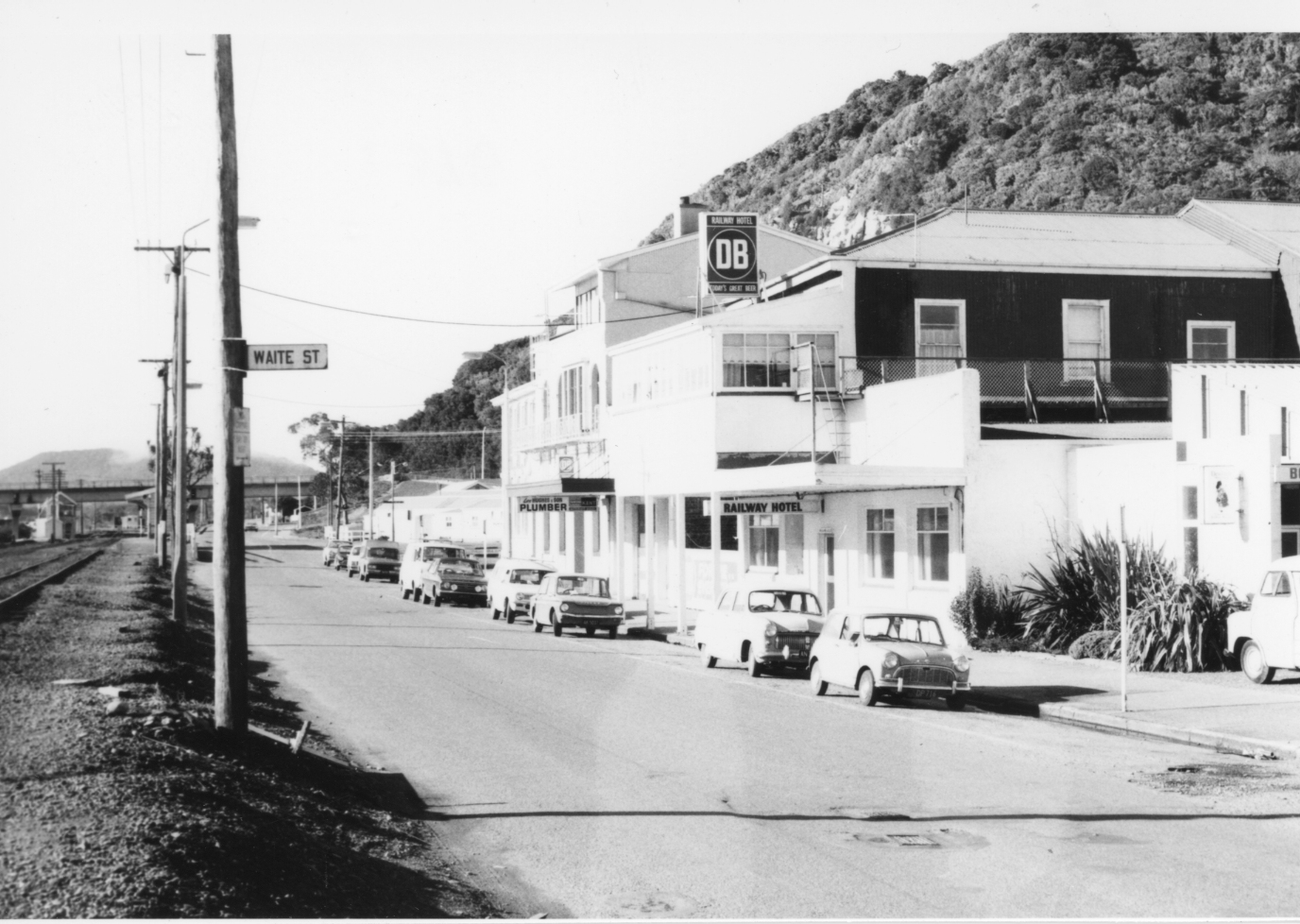
Mawhera Quay and the Railway Hotel in the 1970s

After the war, Rhodes opened a barbershop in Manchester Street, Christchurch, and on 22 August 1922 married Edith Wilton at St Andrew's Church. Together they had four children – Faye, Ngaio, Betty, and Jim – before moving in 1929 to the West Coast. Rhodes set up a barbershop on Mawhera Quay, Greymouth, near the Railway Hotel. The family home was in Tasman Street, but later Dusty and Edith moved to Firth Street in Cobden. Rhodes was always known as "Dusty", a pun on his family name and a likely reference to the unsealed West Coast roads of the time.

== Artistic career ==
Rhodes's son Jim recalls that all his father's spare time was spent painting. An easel in the living room always contained a work in progress, and the house "had a distinct smell of paint, turpentine, and tobacco smoke." (Rhodes habitually smoked a curved pipe while painting, and usually wore a bow tie.)

Rhodes worked mainly in oils, but occasionally in watercolour. Later in his life he worked with acrylics and painted with brighter colours, possibly because his eyesight was beginning to fail.

Rhodes frequently painted on velvet, occasionally canvas, but he was versatile: he painted many murals on the walls of West Coast hotels, decorated the giant Westland Breweries bottles on their 1960 Westland Centenary float, painted the nameplate on a dinghy, and even once painted a pig on a necktie. He commonly decorated wooden fire screens with motifs such as a stag's head or dog's head. Most of his work was given away for free, or sold at a price that covered the cost of materials, and as a consequence he was well-known and well-liked in the West Coast community. He worked quickly, probably completing over a thousand paintings over the course of his life. Most of the works were landscapes, depicting local scenes such as the Otira Gorge, Seventeen Mile on the Coast Road, South Island lakes, or rātā flowering in South Westland.

Many of the community halls on the West Coast had a Dusty Rhodes painted backdrop, usually depicting local scenery. He painted the backdrop of the new Memorial Hall in Kumara in 1952, and was given a gold watch in thanks. Rhodes also painted most of the calico backdrops for theatre and operatic productions in Greymouth, which often depicted exotic locales such as Italy, the South Seas, or a fairy dell.

Rhodes died in Greymouth on 3 May 1979 at the age of 87, and was buried at Karoro Lawn Cemetery. He had been predeceased by his wife, Edith, in 1969.

== Collections ==
- Left Bank Art Gallery, Greymouth
- Three Dusty Rhodes paintings, one depicting the HMS Glowworm in the act of ramming the German cruiser Admiral Hipper, are held by the Greymouth RSA

== Solo shows ==
An exhibition of Dusty Rhodes's paintings was held at the Left Bank Art Gallery, 5–27 February 2016.
