= Yvonne Rust =

New Zealand potter and teacher (1922-2002)

Yvonne Rust QSM
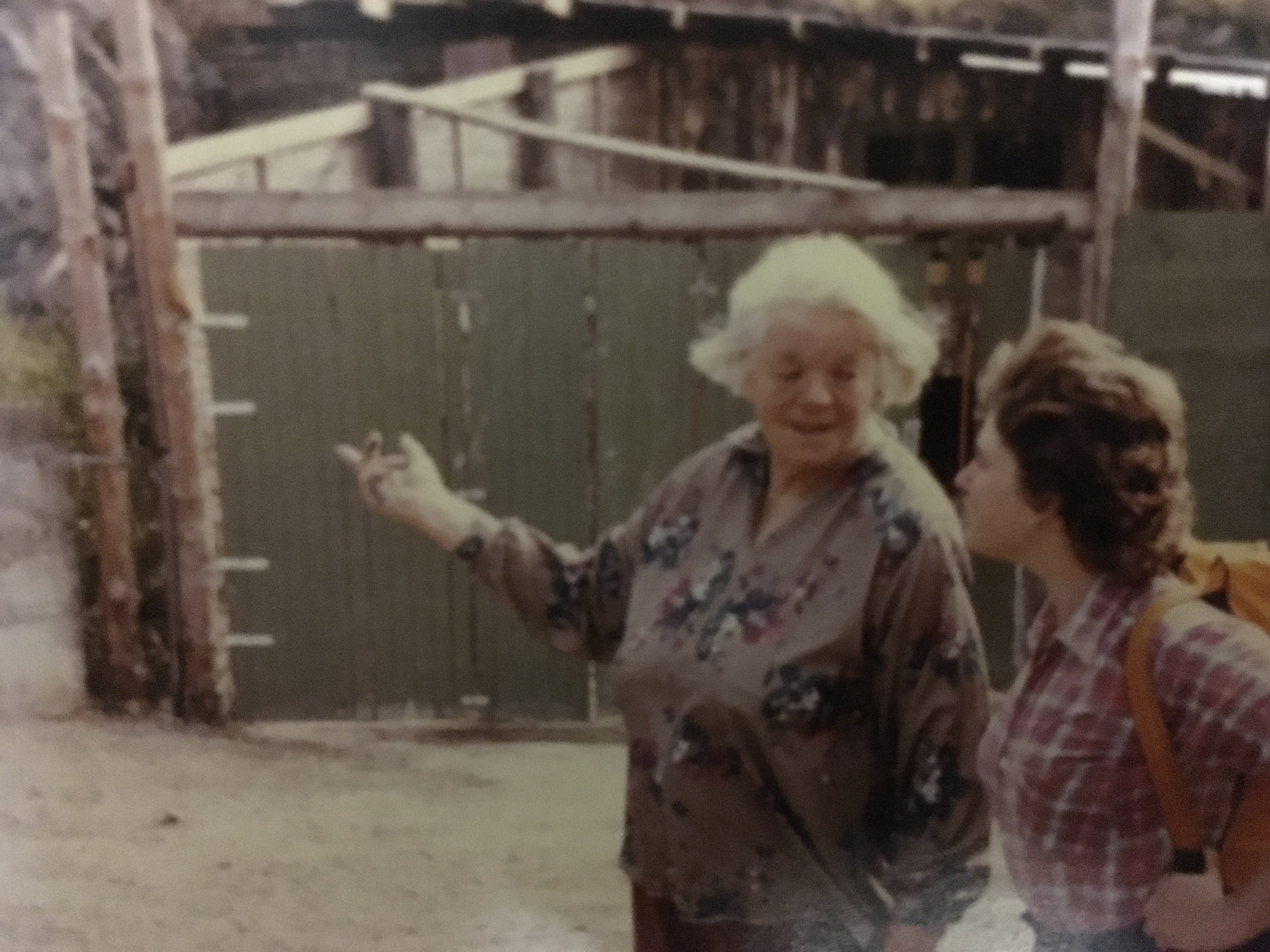
- Rust (left) in 1995
- Born: Niria Yvonne Rust; 19 November 1922; Whangārei, New Zealand
- Died: 26 June 2002 (aged 79); Greymouth, New Zealand
- Known for: Pottery and teaching art

Niria Yvonne Rust QSM (19 November 1922 – 26 June 2002) was a New Zealand potter and artist.

== Biography ==
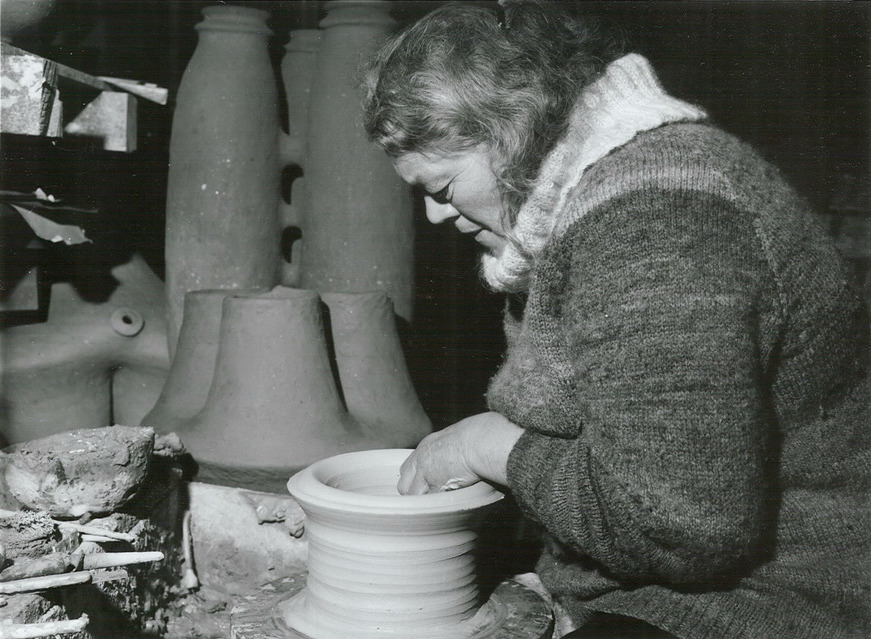
Rust at work on her pottery

Rust completed a diploma in fine arts in 1946 and became a high school art teacher, mostly in Canterbury, in New Zealand's South Island. She developed pottery skills in the communities in which she lived, starting eight studios. She also organised and directed the first national pottery workshop and school and started her own art school in 1959. In 1967 she moved to the West Coast and started teaching at Greymouth High School. She established a pottery workshop in an old brewery near Greymouth, and with assistance from Barry Brickell and others, built a coal-fired salt kiln. Upon the closure of the coal mine at Dobson in 1968, Rust offered to retrain miners as potters; nine accepted the offer, and one, Hardy Browning, became a successful commercial potter despite having no artistic background, later running his own studio in Nelson.

In 1972, she retired from teaching, returned to her home region of Northland and became a fulltime potter at Parua Bay. In 1976 she established the Northland Craft Trust and worked to secure a site in a disused quarry near Whangārei for a regional art and craft centre. The centre, Quarry Arts Centre, opened in 1980.

In the 1983 New Year Honours, Rust was awarded the Queen's Service Medal for community service. A few years later, she began painting and later received an award for her work from the New Zealand Academy of Fine Arts in Wellington.

In 1997, Rust returned to the West Coast to live in Runanga. She died in Greymouth in 2002, aged 79.
