= Hardy Browning =

New Zealand potter (1915–1999)

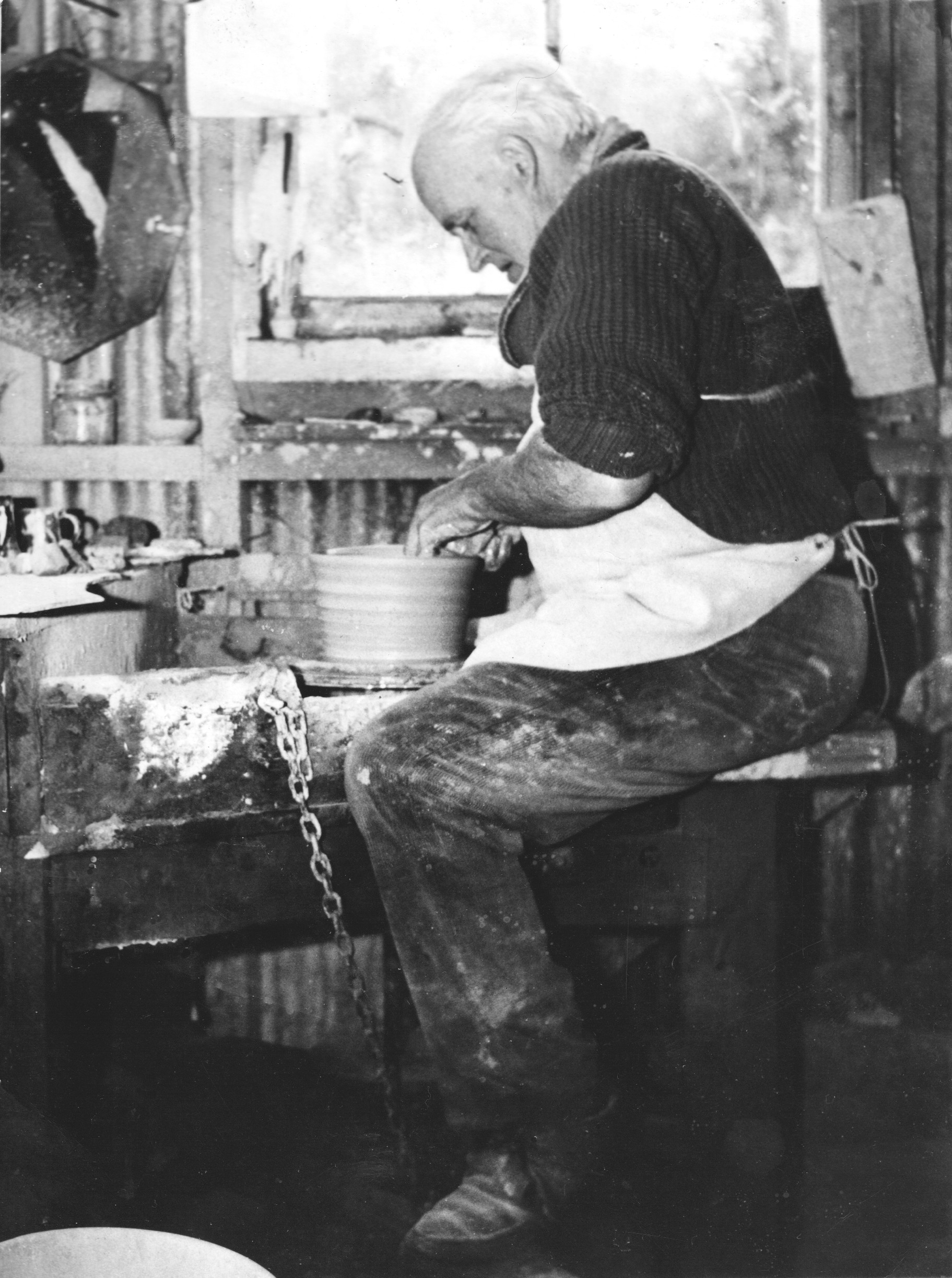
- Browning in his home studio c. 1970
- Born: Harold Browning; 5 March 1915
- Died: 2 November 1999 (aged 84)
- Known for: Pottery

Harold Browning (5 March 1915 – 2 November 1999), known as Hardy Browning, was a New Zealand miner-turned-potter: a coal miner who, after losing his job with the closure of the Dobson Mine in 1968, was retrained by the artist and teacher Yvonne Rust, and operated a successful pottery studio on the West Coast for 11 years.

== Early life and career as a miner ==
Born on 5 March 1915, Browning was the son of Frank and Margaret Browning of Waikaka in Southland. He was educated at Waikaka School, where he showed early artistic promise, winning the Standard 6 drawing prize in 1928.

As a young man Browning worked as a gold miner in the Otago region during the Great Depression. He then moved to the West Coast and became a coal miner at the Dobson Mine, in the settlement of Dobson on the Grey River. On 31 July 1937, he married Zona Kerr at Holy Trinity Church, Greymouth. A political activist and staunch socialist, in 1954 Browning became the first Communist Party candidate to be elected to the Brunner Borough Council.

On 30 September 1968 the Dobson Mine closed and 250 miners lost their jobs. At the time, potter Yvonne Rust was teaching art at Greymouth High School, and offered to run a course training miners in pottery techniques to help them learn a new trade and form a collective; she advertised with a notice on the wall of the newly built mine bathhouse. Rust called on her colleague Roger Ewer to move back to the West Coast and set up facilities for training 40 miners, but by the time he arrived all but nine of the unemployed men had decamped to Christchurch in search of work. A Nelson potter had advised the Commissioner for the West Coast that Rust's plan was unlikely to succeed, and the proposal failed to attract any government funding. Four Dobson miners enrolled in the course, but only Browning became a professional potter.

When the mine closed in 1968 Browning was 54 and had a partially disabled leg from a mining accident. His children had left home, and he was living in Taylorville, across the Grey River from Dobson, with his wife Zona. Considering himself too young to retire, he decided to start a new life as an artist. Although he had no previous artistic training, and only a Standard 6 education, he learned the chemistry of glazes and the physics of kilns.

== Career as a potter ==
By March 1969, Browning was part of a show with Barry Brickell, Doug Mason, and Robert Thorne at Several Arts in Christchurch. One reviewer noted Browning had "made considerable strides in throwing, and the scale of his pots has improved, but his work is often let down by small things…" The following month he was part of a joint exhibition of West Coast artists at the Society of Arts in Christchurch, where his pieces were considered typical of the brown, utilitarian style of West Coast pottery heavily influenced by Yvonne Rust. By 1971 Browning was throwing pots in a home studio and teaching pottery at Greymouth High School evening classes. He was endeavouring to become a full-time potter, selling his work through the Greymouth shop Coast Craft run by potter Daphne Simpson and her photographer husband Frank, and was struggling to keep up with orders from as far afield as Christchurch and Oamaru.

Browning gathered clay from a nearby pit and mixed it with clay from Charleston and Eight Mile, firing his work in an oil-fired down-draught kiln with a salt glaze. He was developing a distinct style, creating his own glazes with bone ash to impart a golden colour, and decorating the pots with fancy scrolls and hieroglyphic-like markings. In 1974, he was the subject of a photo essay by Wellington photographer John Johnstone, published for schools by Reed Education. By the 1980s, Browning had begun to cater for a middle-class clientele, producing pots bearing the slogan "Kiwis Don't Like Nukes", which proved popular with Labour Party politicians (including the Minister of Labour Stan Rodger). A tall blue-white urn of his, displayed at Peter Sinclair's Auckland gallery, was presented to Archbishop of Canterbury Lord Robert Runcie during a New Zealand visit.

Browning became increasingly successful, running his pottery studio for 11 years and producing thousands of cups, teapots, and casserole dishes, as well as larger urns and vases sold through craft shops. He eventually sold the studio, and in his 80s, with decreased mobility and impaired speech, he switched to making carved driftwood walking sticks.

Browning died on 2 November 1999, having been predeceased by his wife, Zona, in 1994.
