= Chris Weaver Band =

American musical group

Chris Weaver Band, sometimes referred to as CWB, is an Americana/rock band headlined by singer Chris Weaver. Based in Nashville, the band's music sound incorporates influences from rock, blues, R&B, Mo-Town and in general Americana music. The band released their albums Standing in Line in 2010 and American Dreamer in 2015.

Chris Weaver was born in West Virginia and started with a short stint in local radio, before moving to Nashville and touring with his band eventually performing at Nashville venues The Stage on Broadway and the Tin Roof. He was named as "Top 10 act to follow in 2013" by Billboard. His song "California High" was used in soundtrack of the 2013 motion picture A Matter of Time.

The band has acquired a following in Brazil, where Chris Weaver band has cooperated with sertanejo stars in Brazil including Fernando & Sorocaba, its lead singer Fernando Zor and with Marcos & Belutti resulting in a live album and DVD Live in Brazil in 2017.

With Go West Productions, the Chris Weaver Band has opened for acts such as John Mellencamp, Earth Wind and Fire, Chicago, and Heart.

== Members ==
Starting members

- Chris Weaver - lead vocals, guitar
- Cornelius "Corn" Perry - bass
- Josh Waters - guitar
- Ben Owens - guitar
- Matt "Ice" Iceman - drums
- Kaid Doyle - guitar
- Eric Kenny - keys
- Reed Pitman - keys

Current members

- Chris Weaver - lead vocals, guitar
- Darrin Favorite - Guitar
- Andy Leab - Bass
- Jason Friedman - Keyboards
- Joe Douglas - Saxophone
- Casey Brefka - Trumpet
- Tyler Parkey - Drums

== Discography ==
=== Albums ===
- 2010: Standing in Line
- 2015: American Dreamer
- 2017: Live in Brazil (also as DVD)
- 2019: (New album to be released)

=== Singles ===
- 2012: "Time Has Wings"
- 2013: "Raise the Dead"
