= Sue Syme =

Artist in New Zealand

Sue Syme (born 1962) is a New Zealand artist. Her work is held in the permanent collection of Museum of New Zealand Te Papa Tongarewa.

== Biography ==
Syme was born in Westport, New Zealand and graduated from Otago Polytechnic in 1981, with a Diploma of Fine Arts majoring in printmaking. She also completed a Diploma of Teaching in 1991, and taught printmaking part-time at Te Tai Poutini Polytech in Greymouth, on the West Coast of the South Island.

Syme continued to live and paint in Ruru, near Moana and Lake Brunner on the West Coast, which, she says, makes people "regard you as some sort of lost hippie caught in a timewarp." More recently she moved to Picton.

== Art ==
In the 1990s Syme often painted cartoon caricatures, vibrant watercolour in drawn outlines. Her work was a satirical and exaggerated depiction of human relationships, noted for its "unique vitality and style". Critic Warren Feeney summarised her thus: "Decidedly fashionable with comic-book taste and style, the best of Sue Syme's work is pervaded by a great sense of dread and futility." More recently she has worked on a larger scale in oil on canvas.

She has exhibited in New Zealand and internationally, including at the Moray Gallery in Dunedin, Dobson Bashford Gallery and The Vault in Christchurch, the Aigantighe in Timaru, and Artworks Gallery in Wānaka. In August 1993 she won a Telecom Art Award for a West Coast pub scene, her work featuring on the cover of 20,000 West Coast & Buller telephone directories. Syme's painting Life on Stage (1993) featured in the suffrage centenary exhibition White Camellias at the Robert McDougall Art Gallery.
