= Chris Weaver (potter) =

New Zealand potter and ceramic artist

Chris Weaver (born 1956) is a New Zealand potter. He has exhibited widely in New Zealand and internationally, winning many awards. His work is held in public museum collections in New Zealand, Australia and Japan.

== Life ==
Weaver was born in Te Awamutu, New Zealand in 1956. His father worked for a bank and was often transferred, so the family moved around New Zealand. Weaver traces his interest in clay from his father exposing the material when digging steps from a bank at the family's Nelson home. At high school, Weaver was only interested in art and taught himself to throw pots. His art teacher in fifth form told his he was "wasting his time" at school and suggested he go straight to art school, recommending Otago Polytechnic. Weaver enrolled at the age of 16, one of the last students to be admitted in the programme with just School Certificate. In 1975, he graduated from Otago Polytechnic with a Diploma in Fine and Applied Arts, completing a Ceramics Certificate the following year.

Upon graduating Weaver moved to the West Coast, initially taking short-term jobs such as sphagnum moss harvesting to support his family while he built a studio at Kaniere, near Hokitika. After trying but not enjoying commercial pottery, he began a full-time career as an artisan potter.

== Career ==
Weaver largely produces clay tableware with minimal surface decoration. As Peter Gibbs wrote, "because he likes the enjoyment he gets from using hand-made objects, he especially likes making functional work." Weaver’s key influences include the work of his teacher Michael Trumic, potter Hans Coper, sculptors Jean Arp and Henry Moore, Scandinavian design and Japanese craft traditions.

His series of 'flatiron' teapots, based upon a common colonial household item, the flatiron, have become an iconic part of New Zealand ceramic and design history. Douglas Lloyd Jenkins called this series "a seminal work of twentieth-century New Zealand design…" He wrote, "at a time when New Zealanders, both Pakeha and Maori, were re-examining their joint colonial past and not always liking what they saw, Weaver's teapot seemed to reach back into the past and pull out something unexpected, something stoic, and something symbolic of survival and eventual revival." Weaver was inspired by an old cast-iton flatiron he discovered in the hot water cupboard while cleaning out his grandmother's house. The handle felt so comfortable that he made that same night a semi-matte black teapot – echoing the flatiron – with a rimu handle, the first work in his series. It went on to win several awards, which led to galleries approaching him for more work, freeing him from having to "go around hawking" his wares.

Waver crafts his pots from a fine porcelain-type stoneware, and create angular work that looks like it has been slab built, although it is thrown on the wheel and later pressed into shape with various tools and wires. Many of his tools are made from driftwood he finds on the beach, a practice originating in the West Coast's isolation, when in the 1980s a tool could take three days to be shipped from Christchurch.

In 1995, Weaver was awarded a grant through Creative New Zealand to travel and study in the United States, the United Kingdom and Ireland. In 2007, he was one of six New Zealand potters invited to undertake a residency at FuLe International Ceramic Art Museum, in Fuping, China. The Chinese residency was in a brick and tile factory, and everything Weaver fired in the first week cracked; the change of techniques he needed to develop inspired a range of new work. In 2010, he was invited as an Artist in Residence at the Sturt Arts Centre in Mittagong, Australia. In 2015 Weaver was admitted to the International Academy of Ceramics in Geneva.

== Recognition ==
- 1993 Norsewear Art Award for Ceramics
- 1994 Norsewear Art Award – Merit Award
- 1995 New Zealand Society of Potters – Merit Award
- 1996 Fletcher Challenge Ceramics Award – Finalist
- 2011 Portage Ceramic Awards – second prize
- 2018 Otago Polytechnic Distinguished Alumni Award

== Collections ==
Chris Weaver’s work is held in the collections of the Auckland War Memorial Museum; The Dowse Art Museum; the Suter Art Gallery, Nelson; Canterbury Museum; Hawkes Bay Museum, Napier; Shepparton Art Museum, Australia; and Mino Ceramic Park in Tajimi, Japan.
