= Axford =

Axford may refer to:

== Places ==
=== England ===
- Axford, Hampshire
- Axford, Wiltshire

=== Canada ===
- Axford, Saskatchewan

=== Nea Zealand ===
- Mount Axford, Fiordland National Park

=== United States ===
- Axford, Washington

== People ==
- Axford (surname)
