= Axford (surname) =

Axford is an English surname. Notable people with this surname include the following:

- Danny Axford (born 1975), English cyclist
- Emily Axford, American actress
- Graeme Axford, New Zealander human rights activist
- Ian Axford (1933–2010), New Zealand space scientist
- John Axford (born 1983), Canadian baseball player
- Kate Axford (born 1999), British cross-country runner
- Samuel M. Axford (died 1873), Michigan politician
- Thomas Axford (1894–1983), Sergeant in the Australian army
