= History House Museum =

Museum in Greymouth, New Zealand

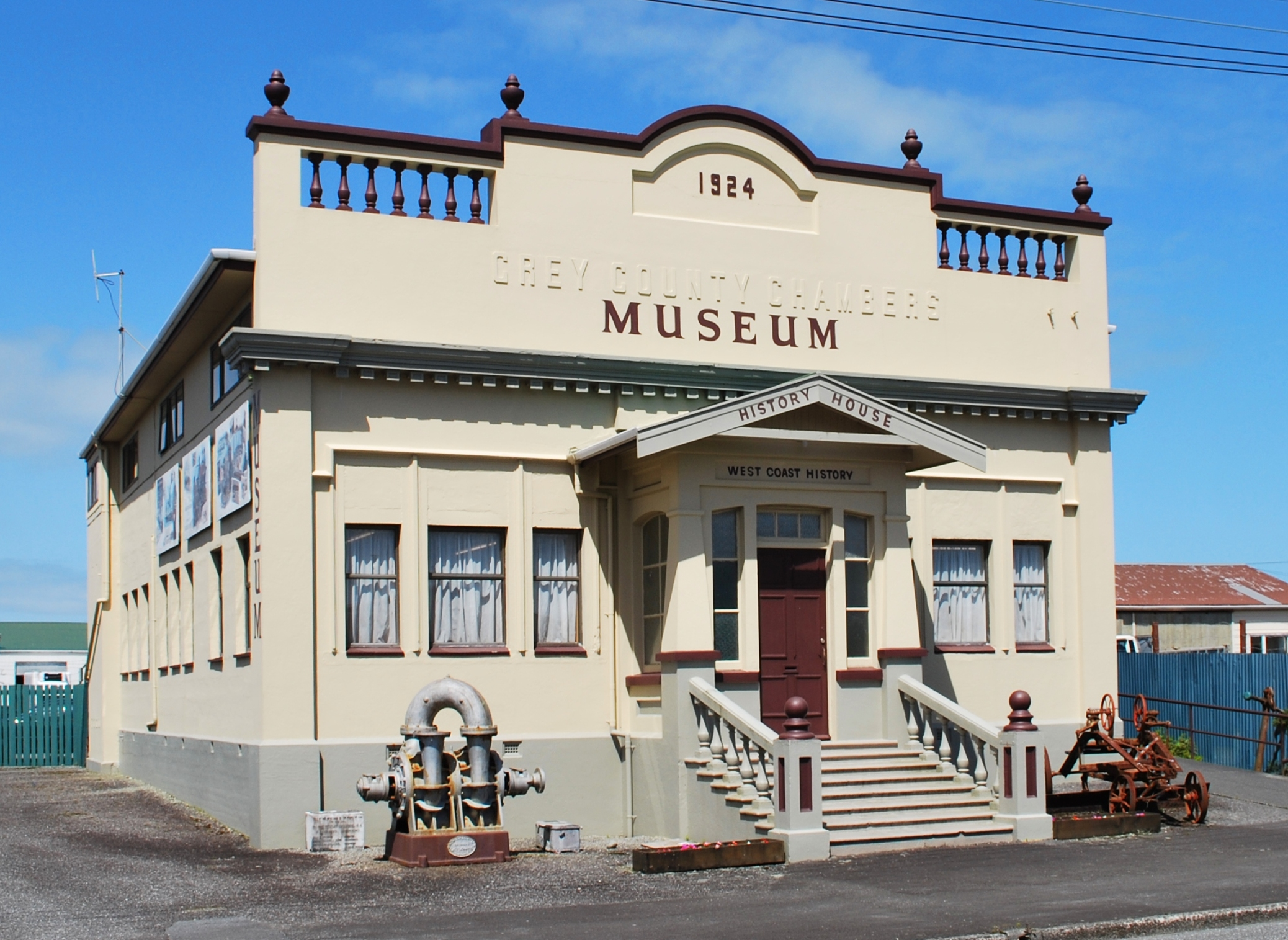
- History House Museum in the former Grey County Council Chambers
- Established: 1996
- Location: 27 Gresson Street, Greymouth, New Zealand
- Coordinates: 42°26′52″S 171°12′12″E
- Director: Liz Burke
- Website: www.greydc.govt.nz/facilities/history-house-museum/Pages/default.aspx

History House Museum is a collection of photographic and archival records and historical objects relating to Grey District on the West Coast of New Zealand. The museum opened in the former Grey County Council Chambers in 1996, but the building was deemed unsafe in the event of an earthquake and forced to close in 2017.

== Origins ==
History House Museum was housed in the former Grey County Council Chambers at 27 Gresson Street, Greymouth. The Grey County Council was formed in 1877, and built the Grey County Council Chambers in 1924. In 1989 the building was vacated when the County Council amalgamated with the boroughs of Greymouth and Runanga and the Greymouth Harbour Board to form the Grey District Council.

The project to turn the empty building into a history museum was instigated by former deputy mayor Kevin Brown, Mayor of Grey Ron Hibbs, and Kevin Beams of Grey District Council. Kevin Brown recruited volunteers from the Lions, family, and local community to fit out the building and assemble a collection. The museum opened in 1996, with Brown as manager. When Brown was elected Mayor in 1998, volunteer Bob Naisbitt took over the running of the museum, along with assistant historian Margaret Mort. By 2013 Margaret Mort and Karen Prendergast were running the History House.

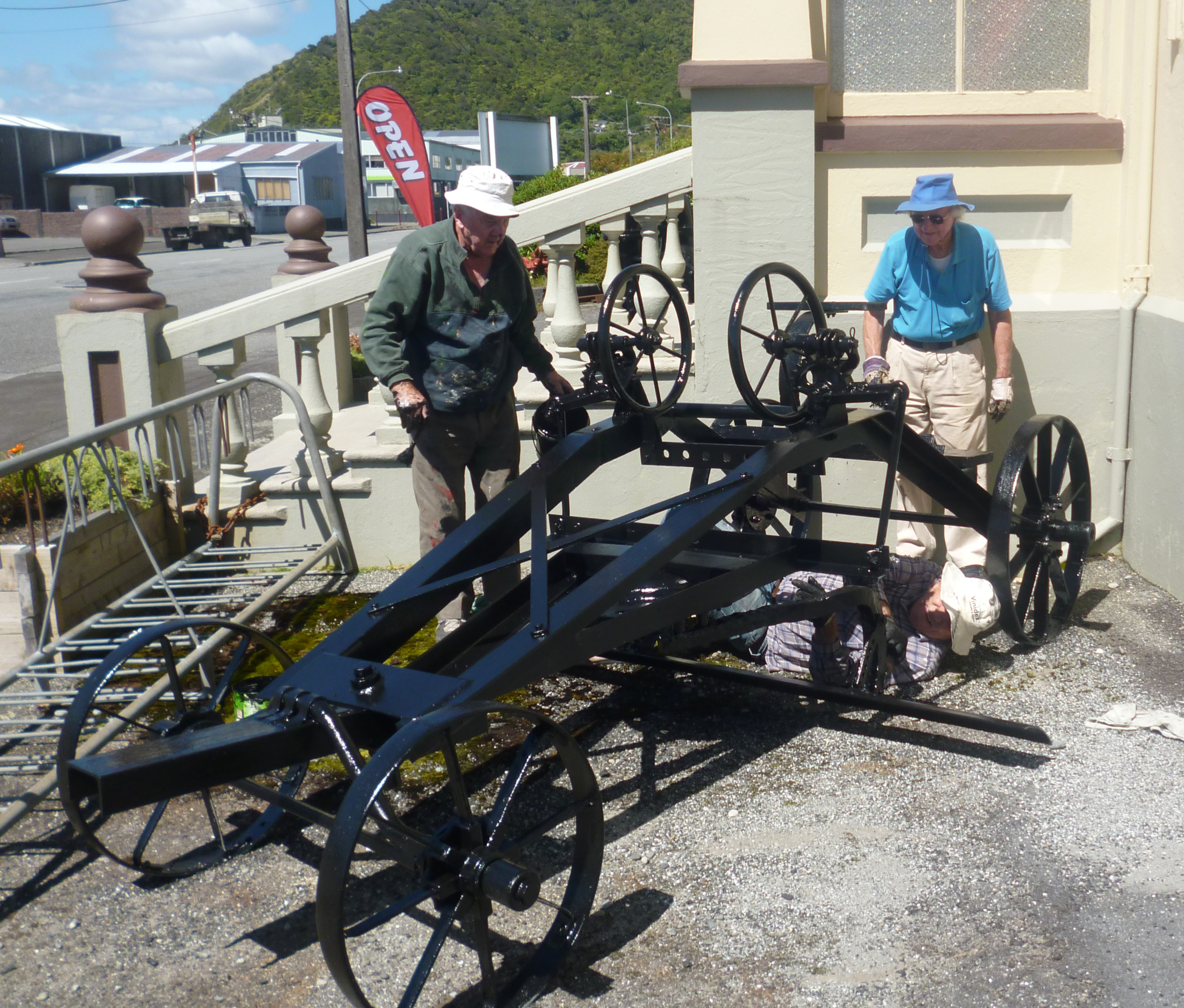
Volunteers Jack Flood (left) and George Gardner apply a paint job to the Standard Austin-Western Grader outside History House Museum. The Grey County Council purchased the grader in 1920 for £225.

In February 2017 a seismic assessment of the Grey County Council Chambers found it was at only 10 per cent of the new building standard (NBS), well below the 34 per cent required for a public building; the standards had been revised following the 2010–2011 Christchurch earthquakes. The cost to strengthen the building would be $142,000, and it is in a flood zone. The museum was closed and the archives moved to the Grey District Library. Several options were pursued: eventually incorporating the museum into a "Discovery Centre", disbanding the collection, or moving to another space – the former Dick Smith premises at 130 Mackay Street at a cost of $50,000/year – in conjunction with an iSite visitor centre.

The location of the museum (at the other end of town from the railway station where most tourists arrived) and the lack of signage were blamed for the low visitor numbers: about 6–8 people a day. The Greymouth iSite manager Phil Barnett claimed tourists were simply not interested in its collections.

In any event the Protected Objects Act and Public Records Act required the collection to be catalogued before moving, at a cost of over $100,000. One consultant suggested the bulk of the collection was not "of sufficient merit" to be archived. The archives at the museum also needed to be properly stored; the Council Chambers are unsuitable and in a flood zone. There is no regional archive on the West Coast, although Shantytown near Greymouth had offered to host one.

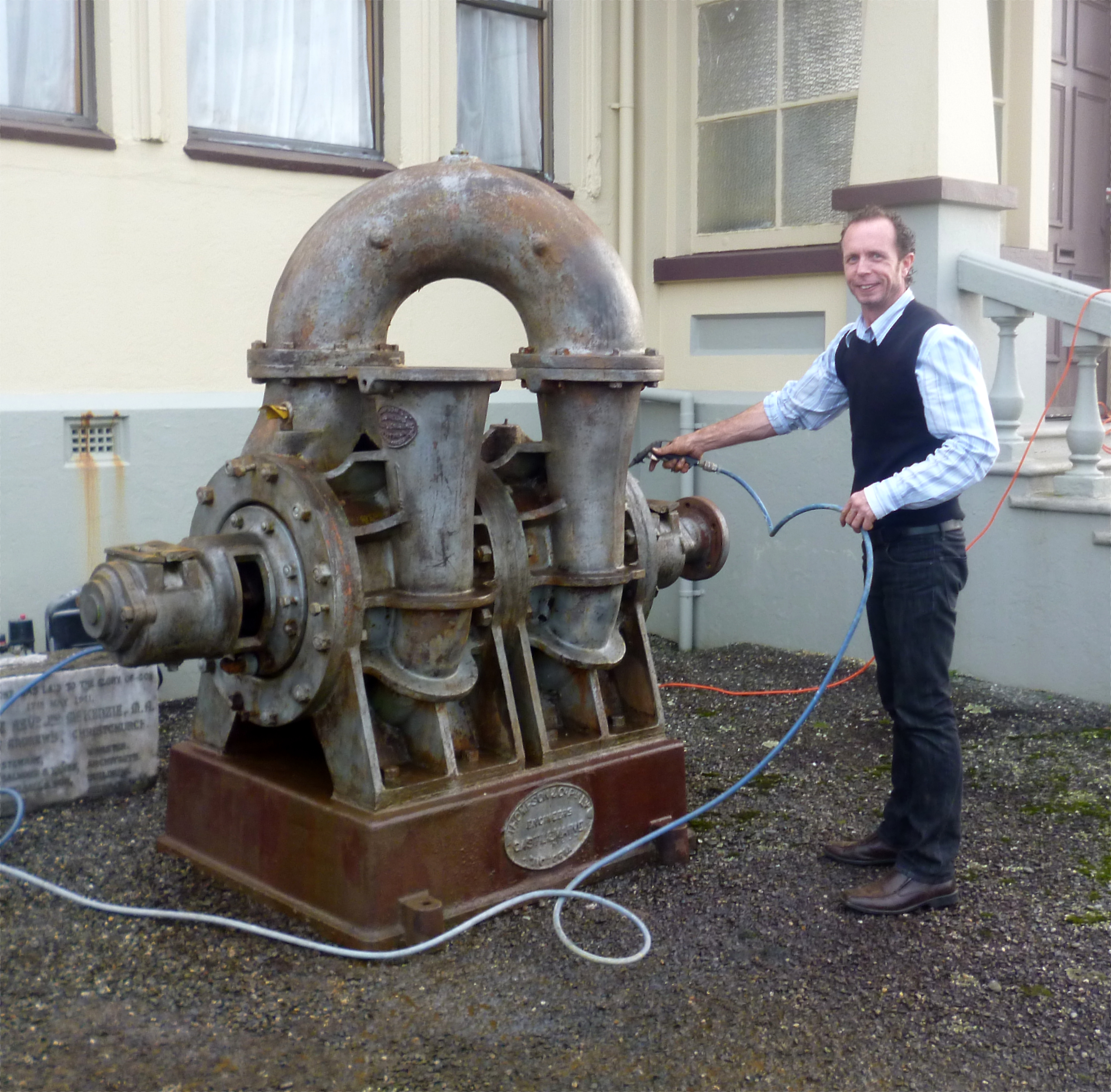
James Tunnicliffe cleaning the gold-mining Kershaw Pump outside History House Museum

After a stocktake of the collection, items relevant to other West Coast districts were sent to the Hokitika Museum and Coaltown Museum. The museum operated from a pop-up space in the former Dick Smith premises, operating Wednesday to Sunday afternoons from 20 December 2017. The space had to close in July 2018 but had 1200 visitors in the first month and 9000 visitors in total, compared to the 1200 visitors a year at its former home.

In September 2018, the Council budgeted $140,000 to strengthen the Gresson Street building, but resolved to move the museum to a new discovery centre combining a library and museum some time in the future. The cost to reopen History House was estimated at $455,000, and just to make the building safe would be $170,000: even strengthened the former Council building would still have problems with climate control, fire safety, and storage. The former manager Kevin Brown took back his extensive photograph collection in protest at the lack of progress in strengthening the building. In 2020 the building was emptied and the collection moved into two climate-controlled shipping containers at a cost of $90,000.

In 2025 the curator of Blacks Point Museum, John Taylor, catalogued and assessed the History House collection. Some items were to be returned to their donors, others to other museums, and a few, like the diving suit once used in Greymouth Harbour, to the new Greymouth Library. The Grey City Council was to put the Gresson Street building up for sale.

== Collection ==
- Photographs of Greymouth, gold mining, coal mining, timber milling, shipping, living conditions and social history.
- In 1998, the Grey District Council presented the museum with a complete set of surveying instruments, believed to have belonged to engineer John Higgins, and some of the earliest may have been passed to him by Grey District's first engineer Edward Butler who died in 1884. The instruments are notable as examples of fine machining before the turn of the century.
- A diver's suit and lead boots with oxygen wheel pump, formerly used from Greymouth Wharf.
- Early coal-mining maps, donated by the Department of Commerce.
- Collection displaying the region's history of greenstone jade working.
- The chair Queen Elizabeth II sat on during the 1954 royal tour
- A set of Fairburn baby weighing scales, brought to Greymouth from the USA
- Timber from the SS Abel Tasman, wrecked at the Grey River mouth in 1936
- a Campbell-Stokes recorder used for measuring sunshine hours
- The album of local photographer Charles Ring
- A metal and leather bag used for carrying gold bars
- A model of the sawmilling operation at Lake Brunner

In 1999, the museum held an exhibition of ten Charles Goldie reproductions, on loan from the son of the proprietor of the by-then defunct Golden Eagle Hotel.

Former displays in Grey District Council Chambers

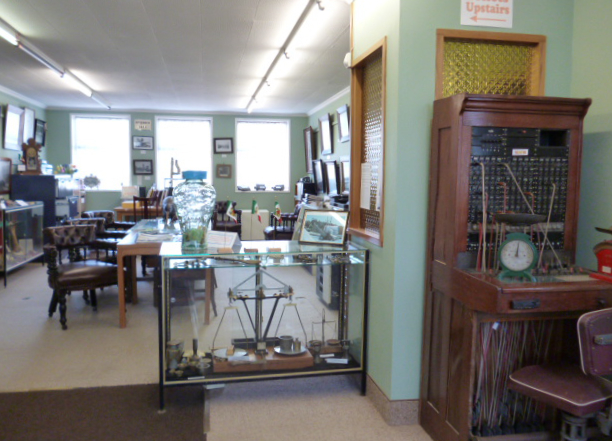
Main display room

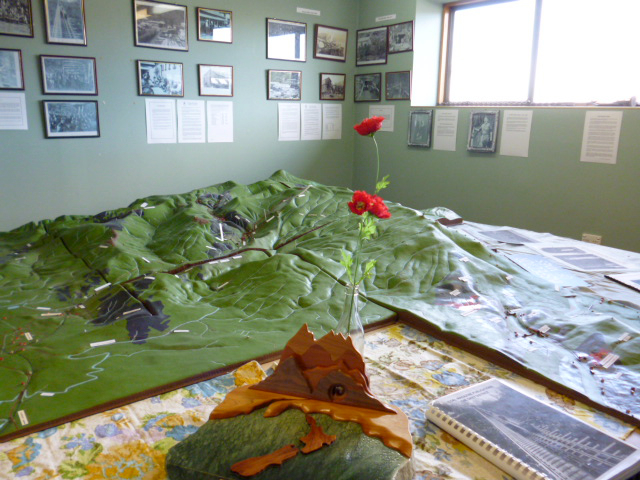
Coal mine room

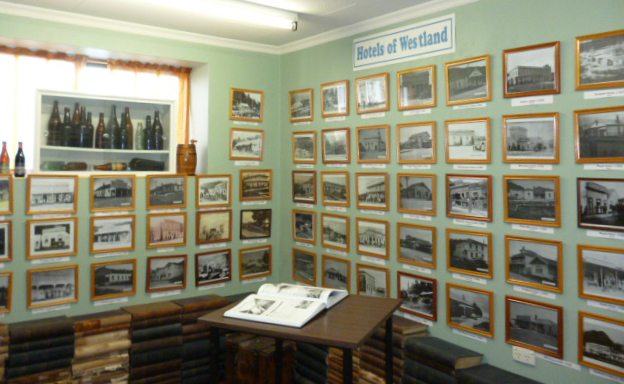
Hotels of Westland

== Publications ==
- Greymouth and the goldfields 1866 (1999)
- Historic Brunner, in photographs (2004)
- History of Greymouth and the area, in photographs (2004)
- West Coast ship wrecks, in photographs (2004)
- Early goldmining on the West Coast in photographs (2004)
- Historic Greymouth buildings, in photographs (2004)
- Grey area, coal mining, in photographs (2004)
- Historic Charleston, in photographs (2004)
- Greymouth 1910: celebrating 150 years since the purchase of Westland (2010)
