= Tony Kokshoorn =

New Zealand politician

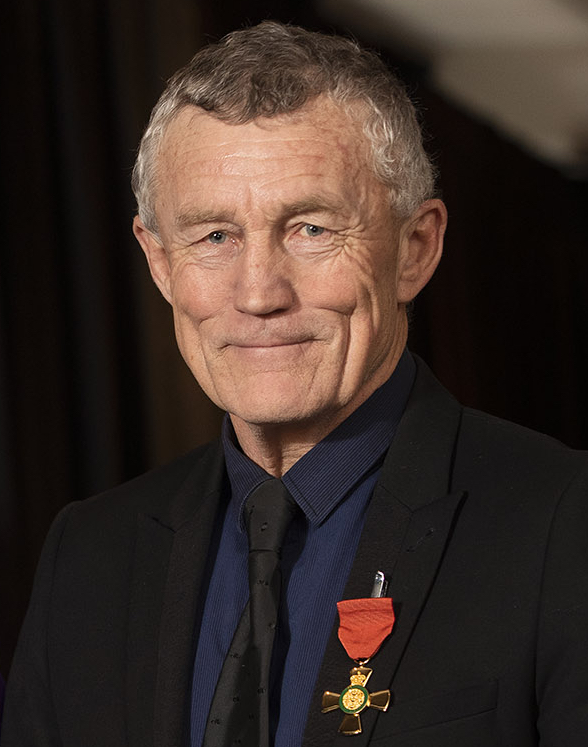
Kokshoorn in 2020

Anthony Francis Kokshoorn ONZM (born 13 February 1955) is a New Zealand politician, publisher, and activist. He served as Grey District Mayor from 2004 to 2019 when he stepped aside.

He is a co-owner of the Greymouth Evening Star and Hokitika Guardian newspapers and a partner in the Greymouth Car Centre. His charitable work supports rural New Zealand in addition to his involvement throughout the Pike River Mine disaster.

As of August 2016, Kokshoorn's mayoral candidacy has been unopposed for five straight terms. The set of three-year terms, collectively span from 2004 to 2019, will make Kokshoorn the longest-serving mayor in the history of the region.

On 24 April 2018, Kokshoorn announced he would be retiring at the next election.

== Early life ==
Kokshoorn was born at Ruru near Lake Brunner, inland from Greymouth on the West Coast. His father was Dutch. He came to New Zealand in 1952 and worked in a sawmill. The family moved to Greymouth where Kokshoorn's father was employed in coal mines. Kokshoorn was educated at St Patrick’s Primary school and at Marist Brothers High School, Greymouth.

== Charitable work ==
Kokshoorn is a founding trustee of the Grey District Young Persons Development Trust, Toki Pounamu Education Trust, and Life Education on the Coast, and is trustee of Dixon House for the elderly. He has raised more than $30 million for charities.

Kokshoorn is the chair and fundraiser of the Lake Brunner Health Clinic rebuild.

== Awards and recognition ==
Kokshoorn was a finalist in the 2010 The New Zealand Herald "New Zealander of the Year" awards. He and the winner were chosen as the Readers' Choice for New Zealander of the Year. He was voted the 10th most trusted person in New Zealand in 2011 by a Reader's Digest nationwide poll, as well as most trusted politician in New Zealand in 2011 and 2014.

He was awarded the 2012 New Zealand Toastmasters Communication and Leadership award for outstanding contribution to New Zealand. In 2013 Kokshoorn was awarded the Rotary International Paul Harris Fellow. Also in 2013, he was named New Zealand Communicator of the Year by the Public Relations Institute of New Zealand.

Kokshoorn was a winner in the Local Heroes category in the 2020 Kiwibank New Zealander of the Year Awards. He was nominated by Graeme Axford. In the 2020 New Year Honours, Kokshoorn was appointed an Officer of the New Zealand Order of Merit, for services to local government and the community.

== Publications ==
Kokshoorn is the author of "The Golden Grey West Coasters 1860–2010". Profits from sale of the book are donated to the Greymouth Heritage Trust.
