= Greymouth =

Town in West Coast, New Zealand

Greymouth Māwhera (Māori)
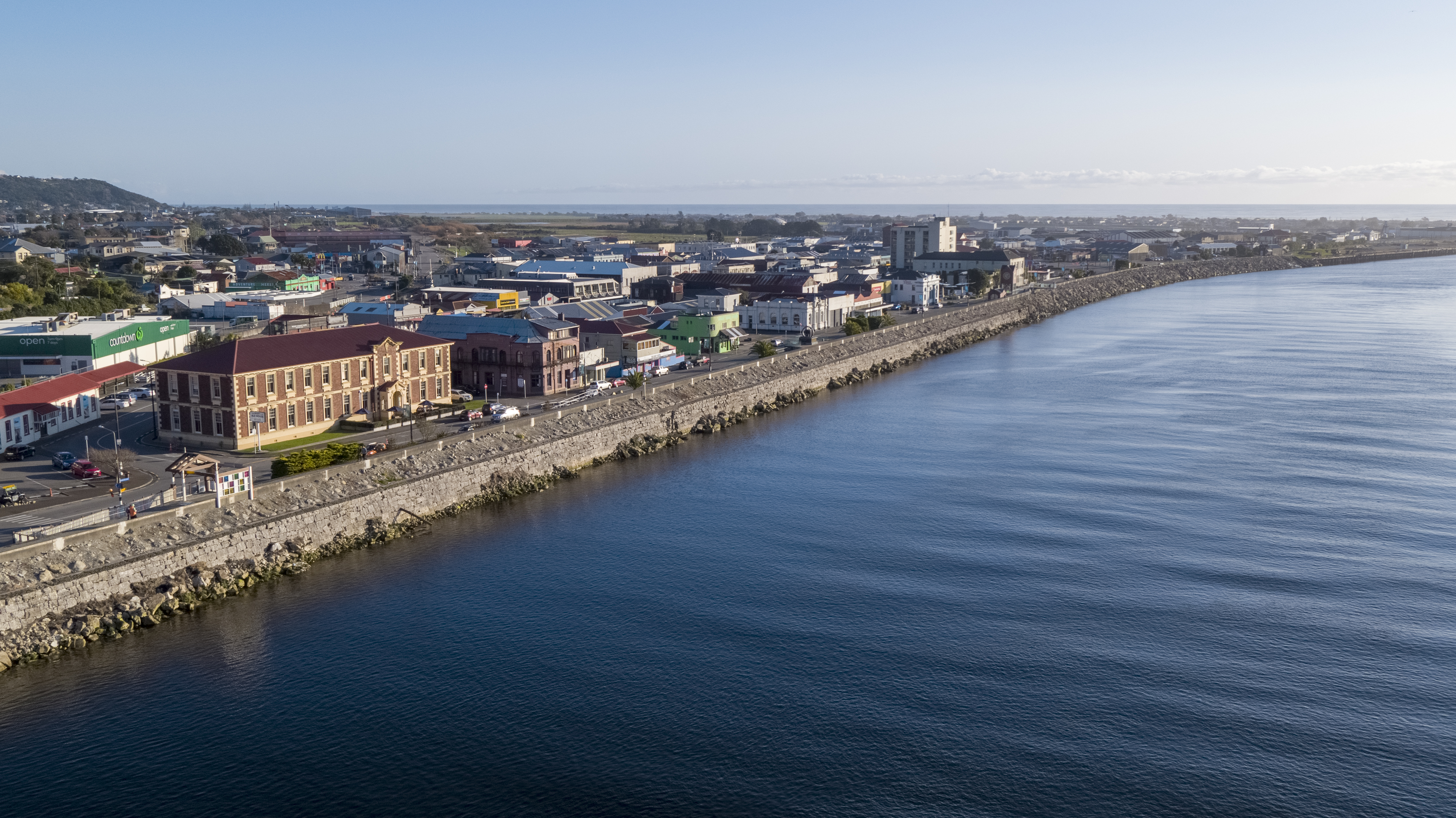
- Greymouth, 2020
- Interactive map of Greymouth
- Coordinates: 42°27′00″S 171°12′27″E
- Country: New Zealand
- Region: West Coast
- District: Grey District
- Ward: Central
- Named for: Sir George Grey, governor of New Zealand

Government
  - MP: Maureen Pugh (National)
  - Mayor: Tania Gibson

Area
  - Total: 27.70 km^{2} (10.70 sq mi)

Population (June 2025)
  - Total: 8,610
  - Density: 311/km^{2} (805/sq mi)
- Time zone: UTC+12 (NZST)
  - Summer (DST): UTC+13 (NZDT)
- Postcode(s): 7805
- Local iwi: Ngāi Tahu

Greymouth (/ˈɡreɪmaʊθ/) (Māori: Māwhera) is the largest town in the West Coast region in the South Island of New Zealand, and the seat of the Grey District Council. The population of the whole Grey District is 14,600, which accounts for 42% of the West Coast's inhabitants. The Greymouth urban area had an estimated population of 8,610 (June 2025). A large proportion of the District, 65%, is part of the Conservation Estate owned and managed by the Department of Conservation making Greymouth a natural centre for walkers and trampers.

== Location ==
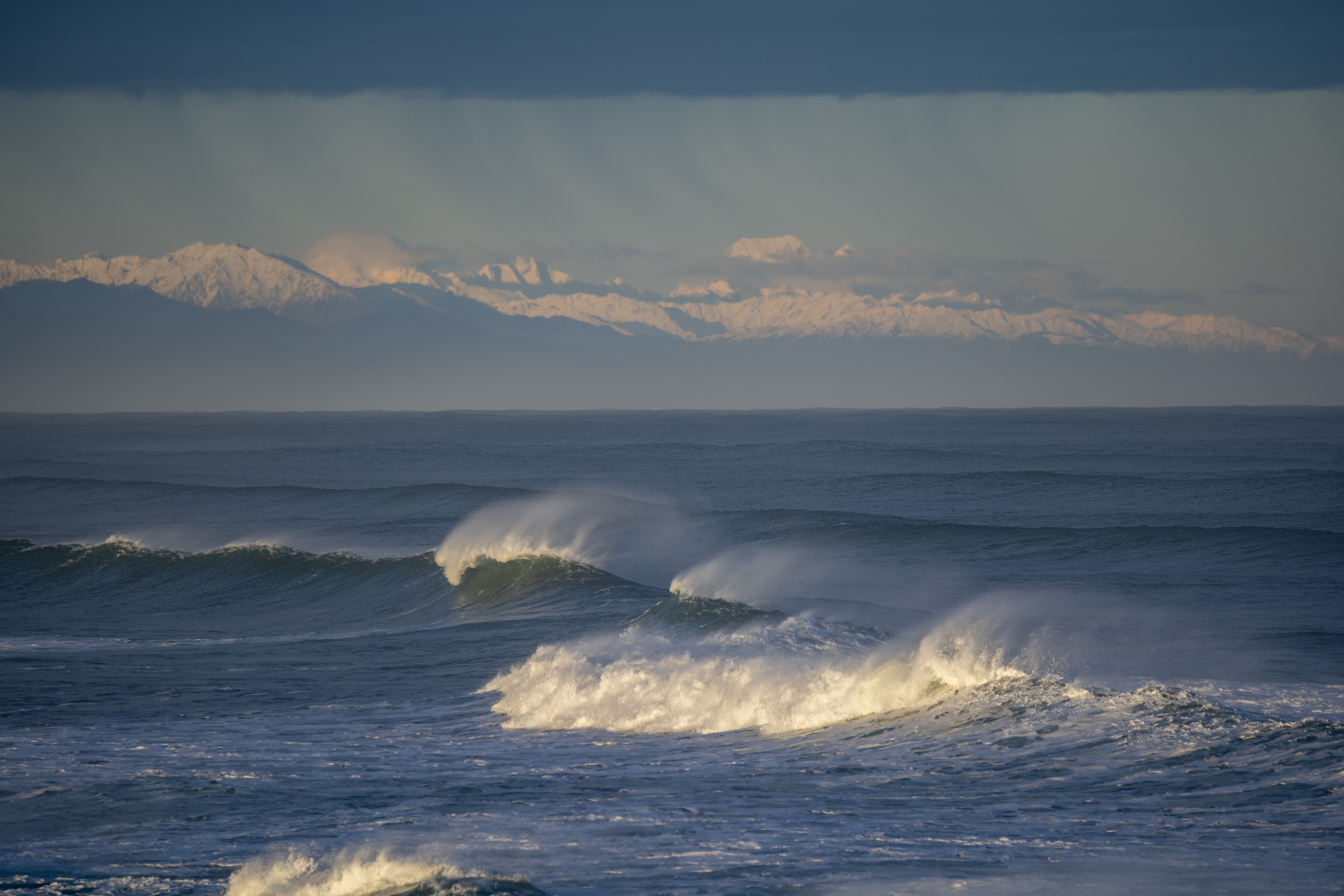
Aoraki / Mount Cook and other mountains from Greymouth's beach

The town is located at the mouth of the Grey River, on a narrow coastal plain close to the foot of the Southern Alps. In clear weather, Aoraki / Mount Cook can be clearly seen to the south from near the town. The mouth of the river divides the town into three areas: Blaketown, close to the river's mouth on the south bank; Karoro, to the southeast, separated from Blaketown by a series of small estuarine lagoons; and Cobden, formerly a separate town, on the river's north bank.

Greymouth is on State Highway 6, which connects it with Hokitika in the south and Westport in the north. It also stands at the terminus of State Highway 7, which runs through Dobson and Reefton, eventually reaching North Canterbury and its junction with State Highway 1 at Waipara, 55 km (34 mi) north of Christchurch, via Lewis Pass. Highway 73 is accessed 20 km (12 mi) south of Greymouth, which is the most direct route to or from Christchurch. The town is also the western terminus of the Midland line from Christchurch. Large coal trains often operate from Greymouth on this line to Christchurch. The famous TranzAlpine train also terminates at Greymouth. The Greymouth Airport is only 1.9 km (1.2 mi) south of the centre of the town.

== Climate ==
Köppen-Geiger climate classification system classifies its climate as oceanic (Cfb). The mean annual rainfall Greymouth receives is high by New Zealand standards and is distributed relatively evenly throughout the year. This is due to its position receiving marine westerlies throughout the year that often do not rise above the Southern Alps. As a result, it creates a rain shadow effect that sees east coast locations having far sunnier and warmer summers. This extreme marine influence also shelters the Greymouth area from hot summer days and cold winter nights. Snow is uncommon, with the last reported event occurring on 4 August 2019.

Climate data for Greymouth (1991–2020 normals, extremes 1947–present)
Month	Jan	Feb	Mar	Apr	May	Jun	Jul	Aug	Sep	Oct	Nov	Dec	Year
Record high °C (°F)	30.9 (87.6)	29.8 (85.6)	27.7 (81.9)	25.0 (77.0)	23.8 (74.8)	18.8 (65.8)	18.4 (65.1)	19.3 (66.7)	22.3 (72.1)	23.2 (73.8)	26.5 (79.7)	28.8 (83.8)	30.9 (87.6)
Mean daily maximum °C (°F)	19.1 (66.4)	19.8 (67.6)	18.7 (65.7)	16.5 (61.7)	14.5 (58.1)	12.3 (54.1)	11.8 (53.2)	12.6 (54.7)	13.7 (56.7)	14.6 (58.3)	15.9 (60.6)	17.9 (64.2)	15.6 (60.1)
Daily mean °C (°F)	15.8 (60.4)	16.3 (61.3)	15.0 (59.0)	12.9 (55.2)	11.0 (51.8)	8.9 (48.0)	8.0 (46.4)	9.0 (48.2)	10.2 (50.4)	11.3 (52.3)	12.6 (54.7)	14.6 (58.3)	12.1 (53.8)
Mean daily minimum °C (°F)	12.5 (54.5)	12.7 (54.9)	11.4 (52.5)	9.4 (48.9)	7.5 (45.5)	5.5 (41.9)	4.3 (39.7)	5.4 (41.7)	6.7 (44.1)	7.9 (46.2)	9.3 (48.7)	11.4 (52.5)	8.7 (47.6)
Record low °C (°F)	3.8 (38.8)	1.5 (34.7)	0.1 (32.2)	−0.1 (31.8)	−2.2 (28.0)	−2.5 (27.5)	−2.6 (27.3)	−2.4 (27.7)	−2.4 (27.7)	−1.8 (28.8)	1.0 (33.8)	2.9 (37.2)	−2.6 (27.3)
Average rainfall mm (inches)	213.4 (8.40)	158.8 (6.25)	175.1 (6.89)	201.3 (7.93)	209.7 (8.26)	232.9 (9.17)	196.7 (7.74)	204.4 (8.05)	201.5 (7.93)	226.6 (8.92)	190.0 (7.48)	232.6 (9.16)	2,443 (96.18)
Mean monthly sunshine hours	207.6	195.1	178.3	140.9	109.2	92.5	113.7	136.8	142.5	161.1	181.8	186.0	1,845.5
Source: NIWA

On 10 March 2005, a major tornado, which started as a waterspout, made landfall in the suburb of Blaketown. It quickly moved through the town passing just south of the main town centre. The tornado was one of the largest reported in recent history in the West Coast region, caused millions of dollars in damage, and injured several people. Previous tornadoes which had struck Greymouth on 16 June 2003 and 28 March 2001 had destroyed several buildings.

=== The Barber ===
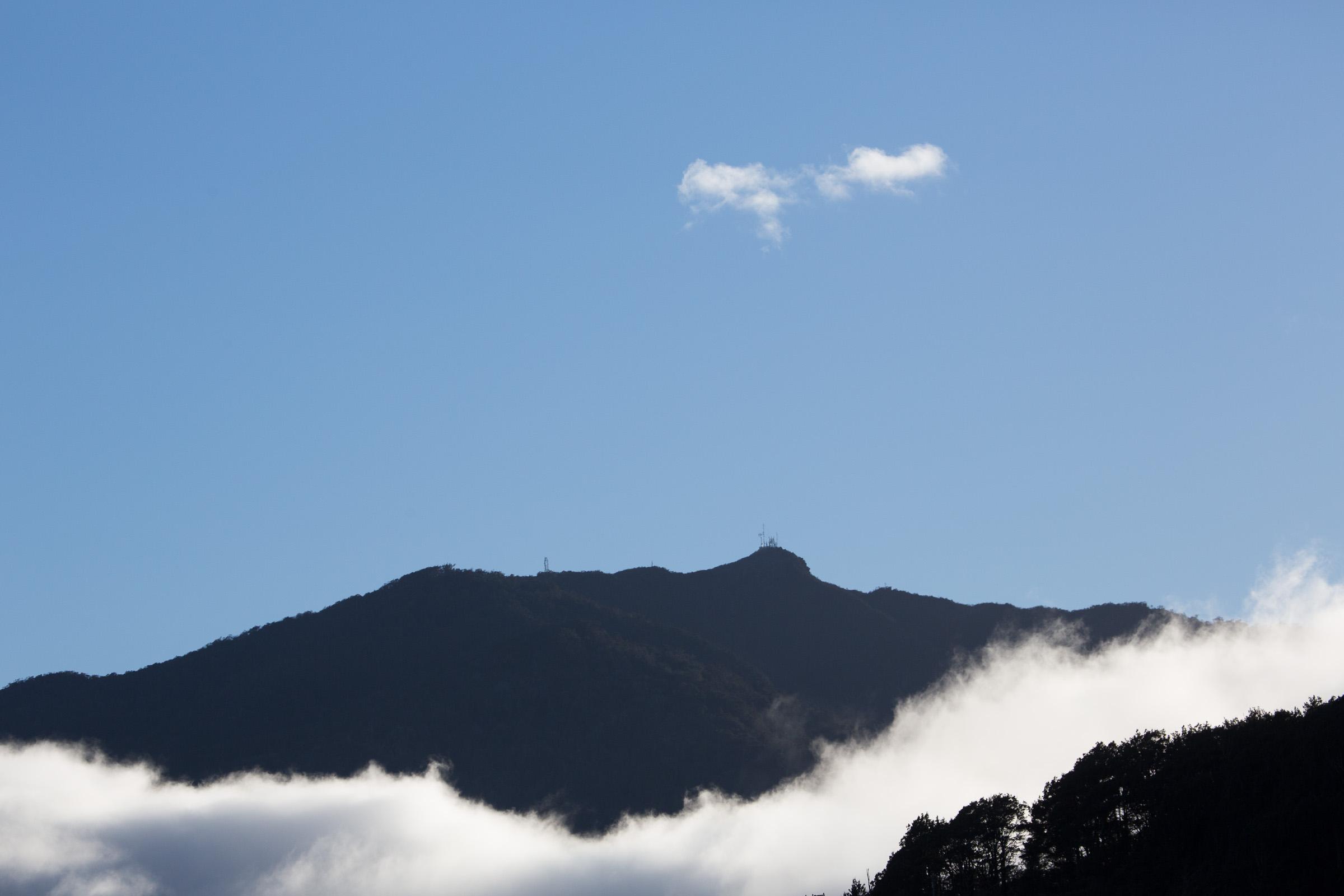
Fog being pushed down the Grey Valley by the Barber

A katabatic wind blows down the Grey Valley and is known locally as the Barber, which can be seen as well as felt because a mist accompanies the cold wind. In the early twentieth century the Barber was also known as the "gorge wind". It was reported that there were changes to the direction, severity and coldness of the wind in that era and this change was attributed to the felling of trees on the Coast Road leading north towards the new settlements of Dunollie and Seven Mile. Greymouth businesses would often advertise the benefits of their products, especially clothing to ward off the chill of the Barber.

=== Flooding ===
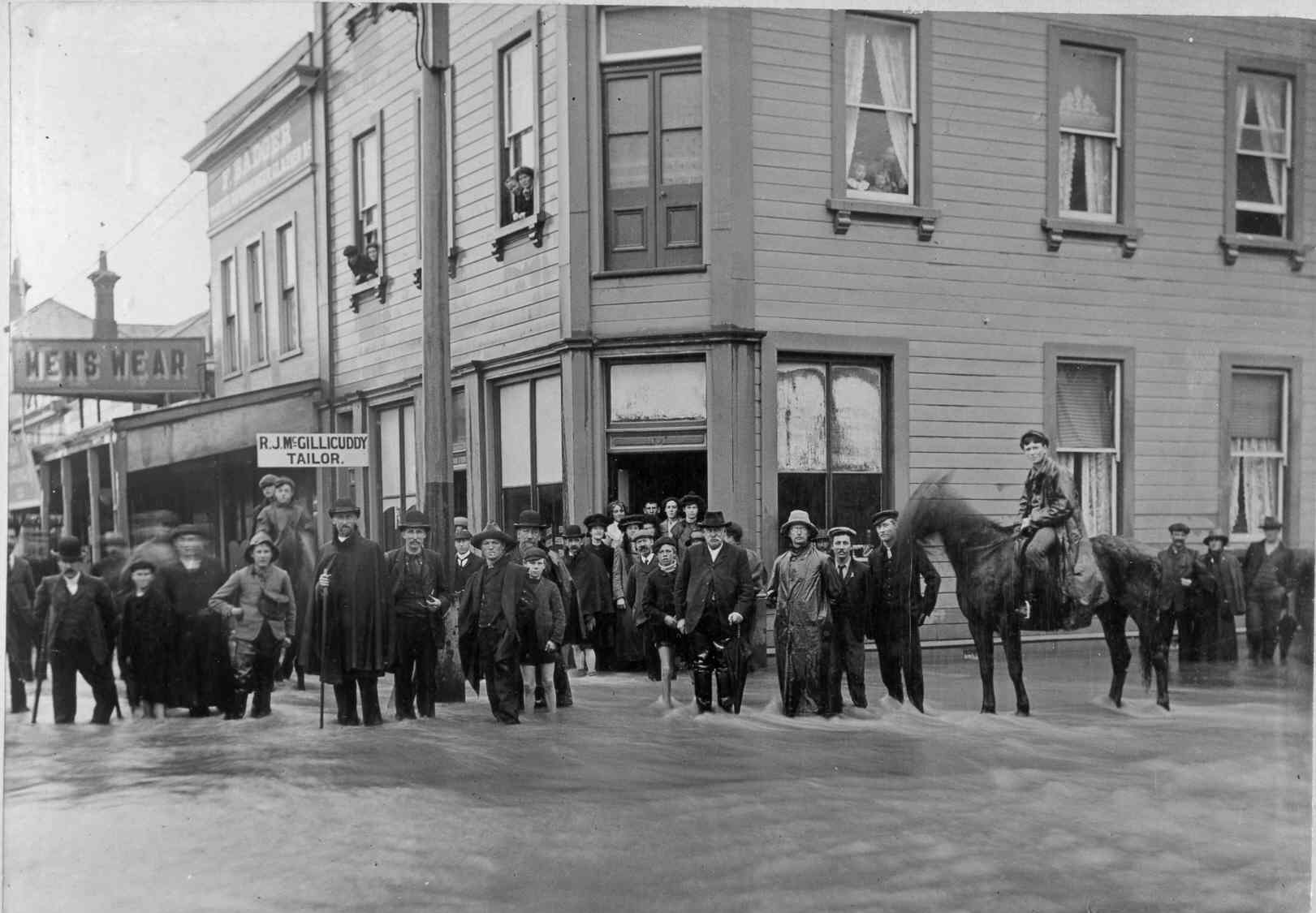
1905 Greymouth Flood

A combination of high intensity rainfall, high topographic relief and short steep rivers often leads to rapid flooding of low-lying land across the West Coast. Since its founding Greymouth has experienced two dozen floods by the Grey River, with many of the most significant being assigned names: for example, the Great Flood (1872), the Jubilee Flood (1887), the Big Flood (1905), The Biggest Since 1887 (1936), The Biggest Since 1936 (1977), The Big One (May 1988) and The Biggest (September 1988). After the two floods in 1988 the mayor of Greymouth, Barry Dallas, organised the construction of a flood protection wall. Rising 2 m above the level of the railway embankment and riverside wharf, it was completed in September 1990 at a cost of NZ$4m. Since its completion Greymouth has not suffered a significant flood, although the river has come close to the top of the flood wall several times.

== Local walks ==
With 65% of the Grey District forming part of the Conservation Estate, there are many local walks to enjoy.

=== Coal Creek Track ===
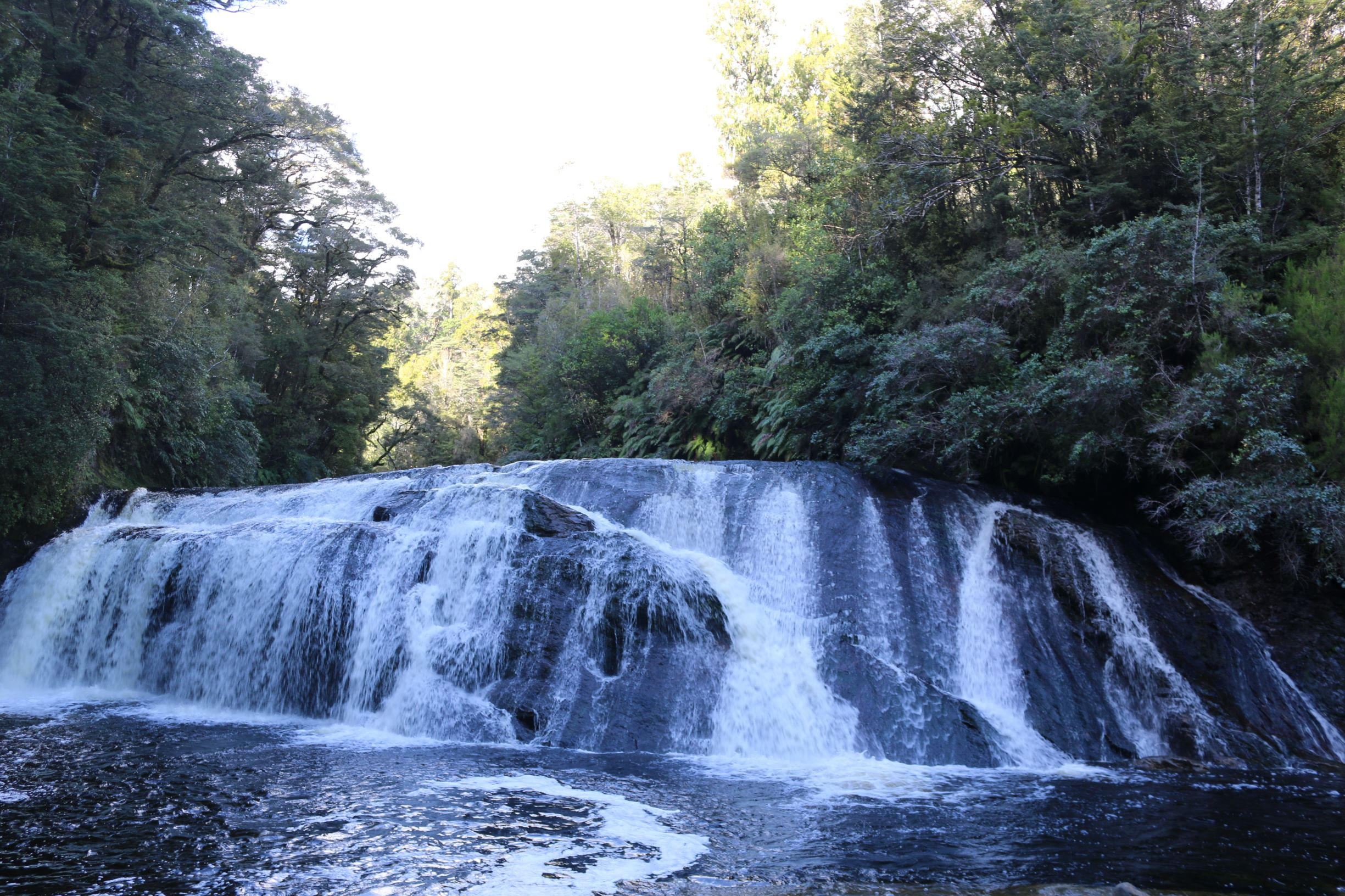
Coal Creek Falls

The path gently descends down to the Coal Creek valley though a mixed beech-podocarp forest. The walk is approximately 3.6 km return and is accessed 8 km northeast of Greymouth at Runanga.

=== King Domain Walk ===
This is a zigzag uphill track taking in four lookouts across Greymouth and the Grey Valley. The first lookout shows the Greymouth town centre and the Grey River. The second lookout provides a view of central Greymouth from a greater elevation. The third lookout at a rock outcrop gives a view of Cobden and the final lookout provides a panorama of the lower Grey Valley.

=== Kōwhai Bush Walk ===
Located off Turumaha Street next to Anzac Park, this short loop walk takes you through the Kōwhai Forrest, half of which is bounded by the mudflats of Blaketown Lagoon. There are some boardwalks which follow through estuarine vegetation.

=== Omotomotu Bush Walk ===
This walk is located in the only substantial forest area close to Greymouth. It is located on Marsden Road and is a 25 minute loop track. Halfway along the track is a deviation to a lookout point with views of regenerating forest.

=== Point Elizabeth Walkway ===
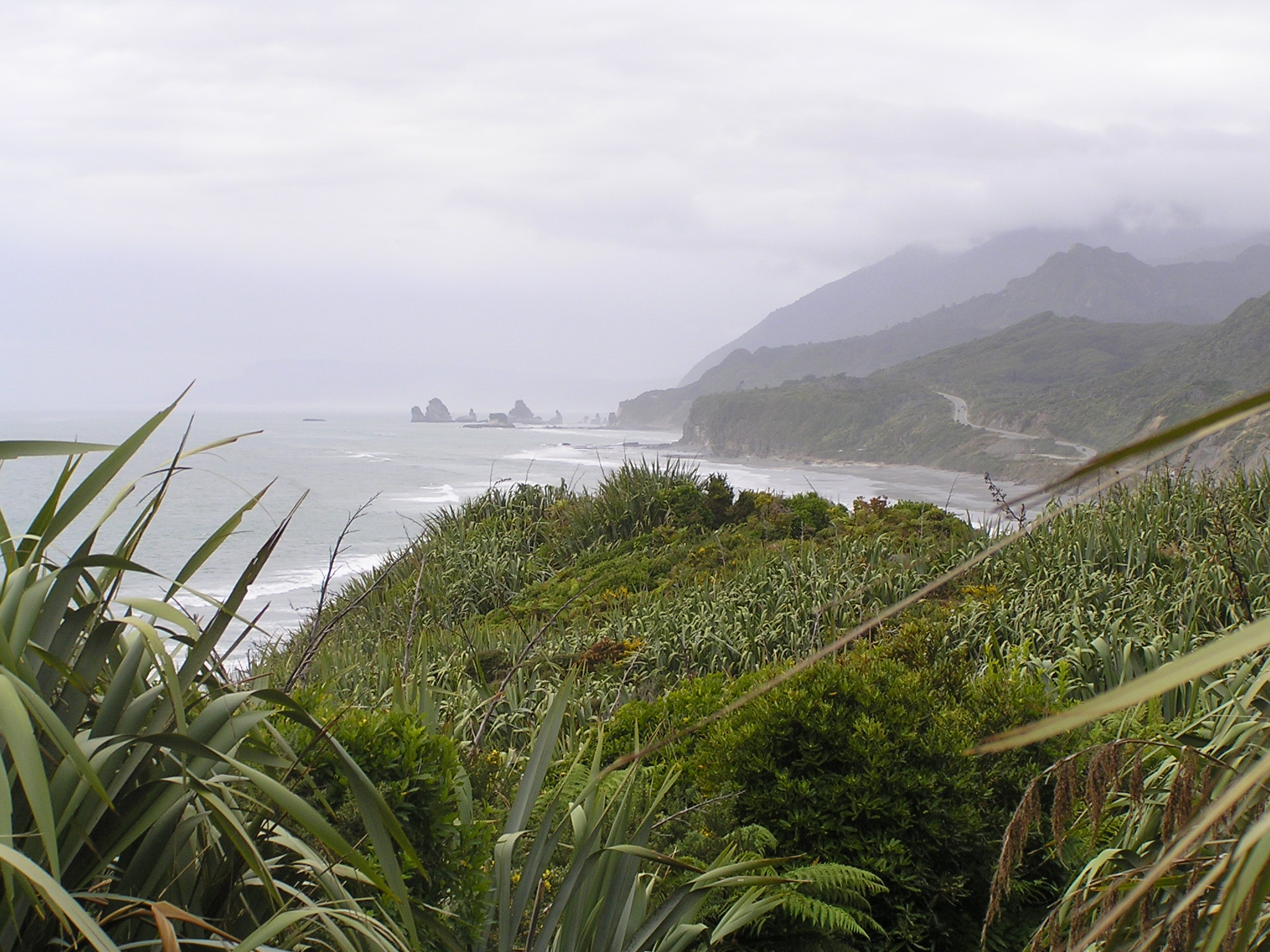
View from Point Elizabeth Walkway

This walk is accessed via North Beach Road, Cobden or Seven Mile Road, Rapahoe and is 5.5 km one way. It is a well-formed walk through coastal bush with stunning cliff top views.

=== Woods Creek Walk ===
This forest track passes by tailraces and dams and through tunnels built by gold miners in the 19th century and is a 1.1 km loop track. It is approximately 30 km southeast of Greymouth.

== History ==
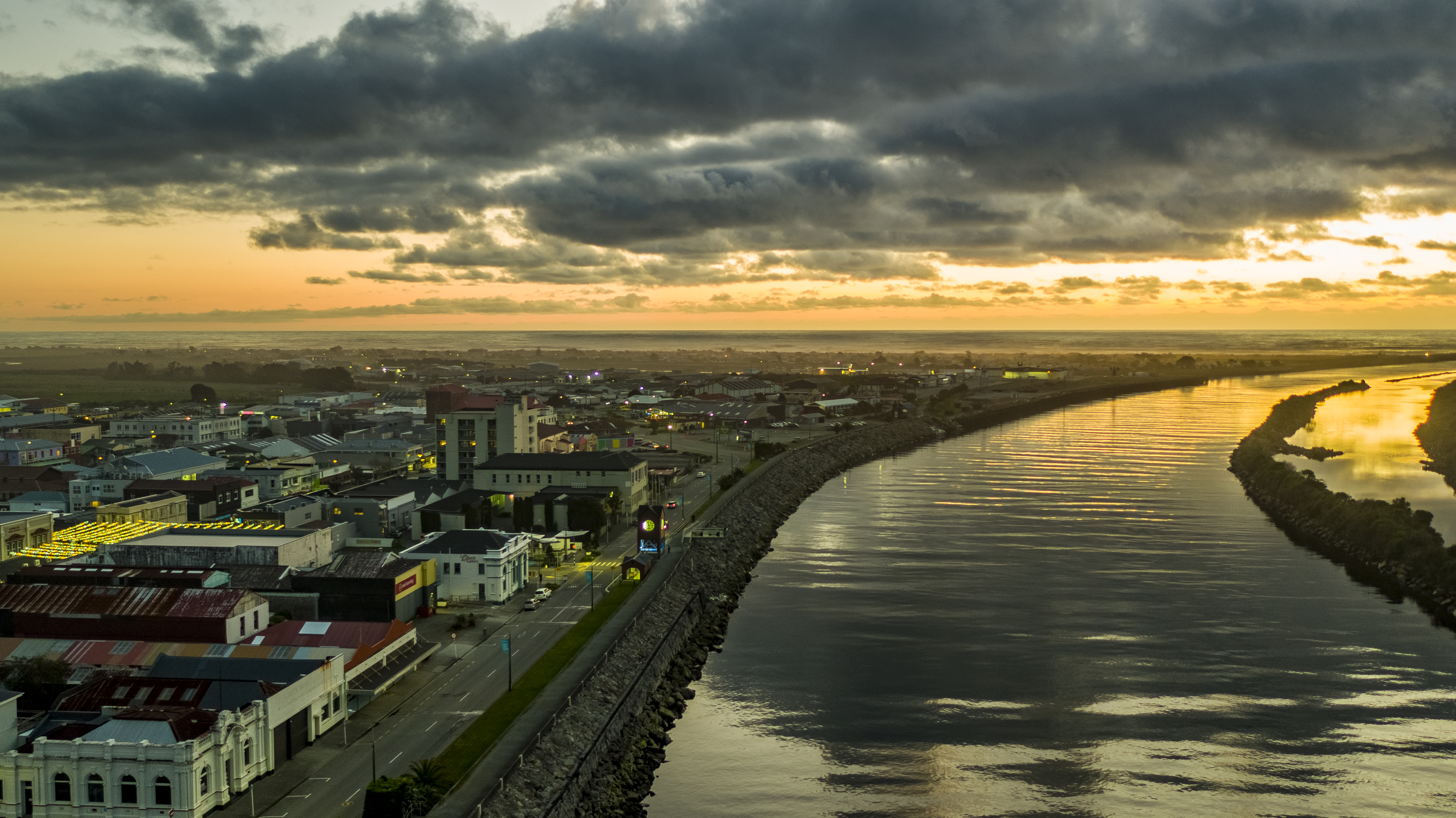
Grey River / Māwheranui

=== Polynesian settlement ===
Archaeological evidence shows Māori settlements on the West Coast of New Zealand's South Island dating back to 1300–1400 AD. Located at Karamea, Westport (Kawatiri), Bruce Bay (Mahitahi) and Jackson Bay (Okahu), excavations have identified in-ground cooking ovens (hāngī) and middens (rubbish tips). They show that these early Māori ate moa and seals as well as fish from the river and sea. These earliest West Coast people were from east Polynesia. Their stone knives and adzes were made by using the Polynesian flaking method and personal ornaments found on the sites were based on traditional Polynesian shark-tooth designs. These early people were subsumed by later Māori tribes (iwi) who came to the West Coast as population grew and settlement spread.

=== Ngāi Tahu on Te Tai Poutini ===
Ngāi Tahu came to Te Tai Poutini (the West Coast) about the start of the nineteenth century. Under Tūhuru Kōkare, a great warrior, they defeated the Ngāti Wairangi in a series of battles for the greenstone (pounamu) coast. The West Coast was one of the principal sources of the highly-prized greenstone which is almost as hard as steel. The Poutini Ngāi Tahu built fortified pā at Māwhera (Greymouth), Ōkārito and Mahitahi (Bruce Bay) and had villages or gardens at other places including Inangahua, Taramakau, Mahinapua, Pouerua, Okuru and Arawhata (Jackson Bay). The name Māwhera (meaning 'wide spread river mouth', is still an alternative name for the Grey River.

=== European settlement ===
The first Europeans to visit the site of what is now Greymouth were Thomas Brunner and Charles Heaphy in 1846. Brunner and Heaphy were detailed by the Nelson Land Company to investigate the country south of the Buller and to report on its resources and potential as a field for further settlement. They set out from Nelson on 17 March 1846 accompanied by a Māori named Kehu, who had previously visited the West Coast and who had agreed to act as their guide. Brunner discovered coal in the Grey Valley, and several places in the region (notably the town of Brunner and Lake Brunner) bear his name. Brunner himself named the Grey River after Sir George Grey, Governor of New Zealand.

As numbers of colonists continued to increase in Nelson and Canterbury, interest grew in settling the West Coast, but the land was still owned by Māori – Poutini Ngāi Tahu. In 1857 Poutini Ngāi Tahu chiefs wrote to Donald McLean, the New Zealand government land purchase officer, offering to sell the land for £2500, as long as some land was reserved for their use and they kept their rights to the pounamu (greenstone) of the Arahura River. In 1859, James Mackay was sent to broker a purchase deal, known as the Arahura Deed. This was signed in Māwhera by leading chiefs on 21 May 1860: it sold the entire West Coast to the Crown for just £300 (equivalent to NZ$46,563 in 2026), apart from a scattering of reserves totalling 4,000 ha (40 km^{2}). (Just after the signing, Mackay capsized his canoe in the Grey River, and some of the writing in the document is smudged to this day.) The reserves included Māwhera, now the centre of Greymouth.

On 22 July 1864 the Nelson became the first steamer to cross the Grey bar and steam up the Grey River. Aboard the 'Nelson' were Matthew Batty and Reuben Waite plus approximately 70 prospectors. Reuben Waite would open the first store in Greymouth on the banks of the Grey River at the corner of which is now Waite Street and Mawhera Quay. Matthew Batty would become the first European coal miner on the Grey River overseeing a group of Māori digging up the Brunner Seam on the Grey River bank.

John Rochfort undertook the original survey of the site of the township in 1865. Greymouth was proclaimed a borough on 16 July 1868, and on 26 August 1868 an election was held. On 16 September 1868, the new borough council held its first meeting and unanimously elected Edward Masters as the first mayor of Greymouth.

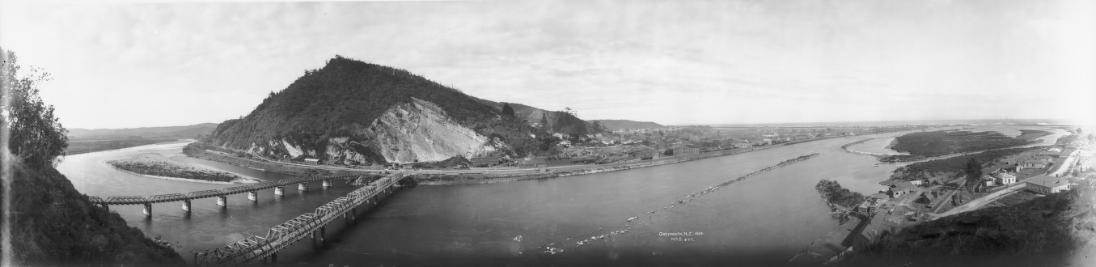
Greymouth in 1924

From 1853 until the abolition of provinces in 1876, Greymouth was first part of Canterbury Province (the West Coast part of the Province was known as West Canterbury) and then part of an independent Westland Province. However Cobden, on the north (or right) bank of the Grey River was a part of Nelson Province from 1853 to 1876. The boundary between the Canterbury and Nelson provinces had been set as a straight line from the head of the Hurunui River to Lake Brunner at a time when the area was virtually uninhabited, but the West Coast gold rush straddled that boundary, with a population boom also straddling the boundary. In 1866, there had been a proposal for portions of Canterbury Province, including the urban area of Greymouth and the rural area south, to be annexed and solely administered by Nelson Province. The situation for the citizens of the area was partially alleviated with the creation of the County of Westland – which had all the administrative powers of a provincial council, but saw the legislative powers remain with Parliament in Wellington. Members of Parliament were not happy with having to spend their time on local legislation, and in 1873 the government elevated the county to full provincial status as Westland Province.

=== Shipwrecks on the Greymouth Bar ===
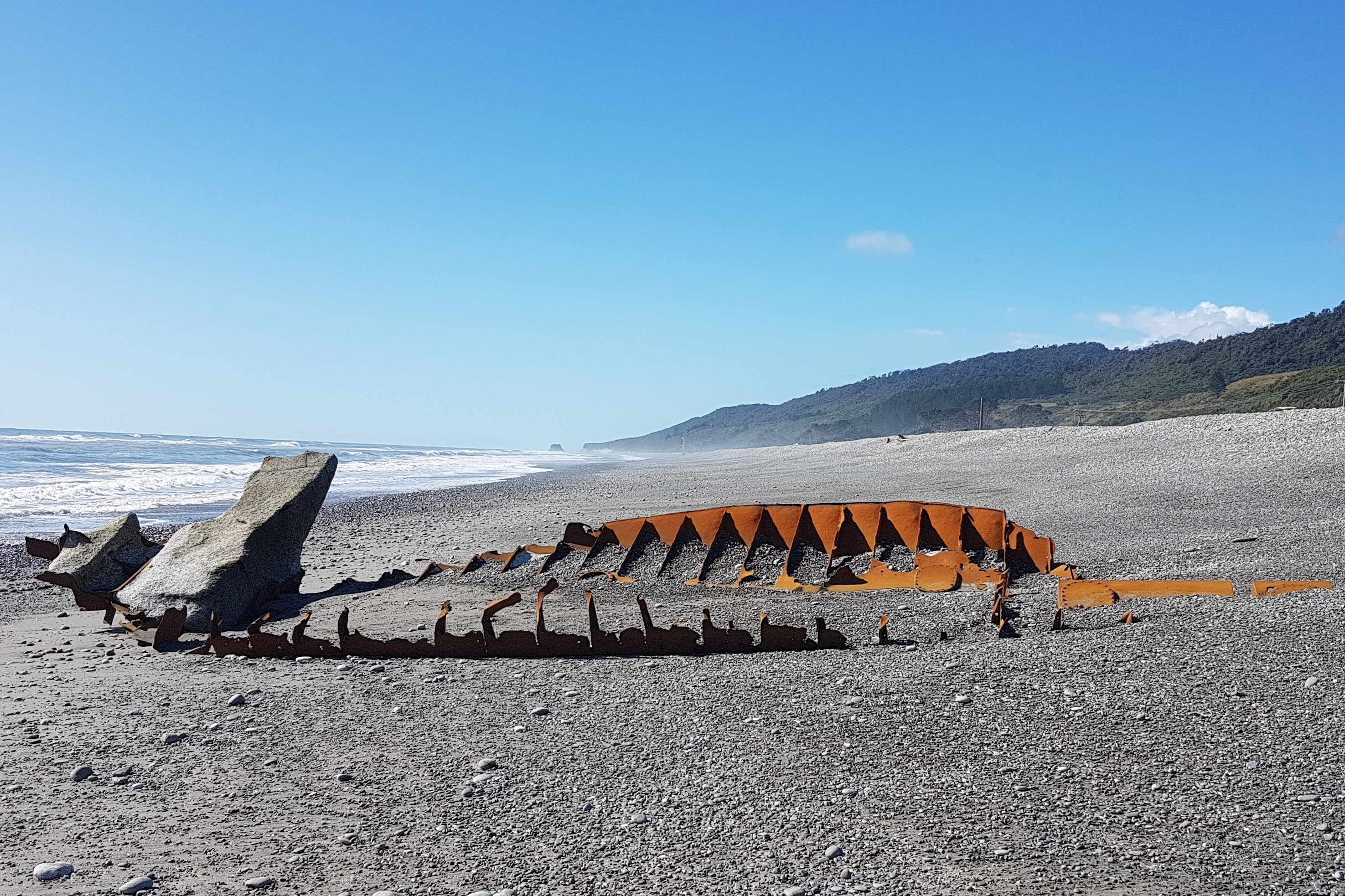
Shipwreck of the Abel Tasman, Cobden Beach, Greymouth

The Greymouth Bar is a sandbar at the mouth of the Grey River. It is notorious in New Zealand and more than 44 ships have been wrecked there while entering, leaving or mooring in the harbour. The first shipwreck happened on 13 September 1863 when the schooner Gipsy carrying mostly gold diggers from Sydney, was caught in a northeasterly gale. Sixteen lives have been lost since 1865, when the Nugget drifted out of the river and across the bar at night. The cutter was half full of water when the crew came on deck and only one of the two crewmen made it safely to shore.

The year 1866 was the most dangerous year for shipping in Greymouth, with five schooners and screw steamers being wrecked due to a number of reasons, including getting stranded on the spit, sheered in current, insufficient tug power and the engine stopped.

On 23 June 1910 the Lauderdale was heading to Greymouth from Nydia Bay and on 27 June struck the north tiphead, ending up stranded on the Blaketown beach after, at one point, being grounded against another shipwreck from 1908, the Hawea. The Lauderdale is one of three wrecks which remain on the Greymouth coastline in the twenty-first century and in April 2016 a local Blaketown family unveiled a commemorative plaque on the West Coast Cycle Trail, telling its story. This plaque is within sight of the wreck remains which appear and disappear on the shoreline with the tides. The Abel Tasman and the Hawea are the other two remaining wrecks.

== Demographics ==
Greymouth is described by Stats NZ as a small urban area, which covers 27.70 km^{2} (10.70 sq mi). It had an estimated population of 8,610 as of June 2025, with a population density of 311 people per km^{2}.

Historical population for Greymouth town
Year	Pop.	±% p.a.
1991	10,059	—
1996	10,254	+0.38%
2001	9,528	−1.46%
2006	8,229	−2.89%
2013	8,118	−0.19%
2018	7,965	−0.38%
2023	8,337	+0.92%
The population for years before 2013 may be for different boundaries. Source:

Greymouth had a population of 8,337 in the 2023 New Zealand census, an increase of 372 people (4.7%) since the 2018 census, and an increase of 219 people (2.7%) since the 2013 census. There were 4,122 males, 4,173 females, and 39 people of other genders in 3,492 dwellings. 2.9% of people identified as LGBTIQ+. The median age was 45.0 years (compared with 38.1 years nationally). There were 1,380 people (16.6%) aged under 15 years, 1,296 (15.5%) aged 15 to 29, 3,786 (45.4%) aged 30 to 64, and 1,872 (22.5%) aged 65 or older.

People could identify as more than one ethnicity. The results were 89.3% European (Pākehā); 12.4% Māori; 1.7% Pasifika; 5.4% Asian; 0.5% Middle Eastern, Latin American and African New Zealanders (MELAA); and 3.4% other, which includes people giving their ethnicity as "New Zealander". English was spoken by 97.9%, Māori by 2.1%, Samoan by 0.2%, and other languages by 5.9%. No language could be spoken by 1.6% (e.g. too young to talk). New Zealand Sign Language was known by 0.5%. The percentage of people born overseas was 13.5, compared with 28.8% nationally.

Religious affiliations were 33.1% Christian, 0.9% Hindu, 0.3% Islam, 0.3% Māori religious beliefs, 0.3% Buddhist, 0.4% New Age, and 1.0% other religions. People who answered that they had no religion were 56.2%, and 7.4% of people did not answer the census question.

Of those at least 15 years old, 966 (13.9%) people had a bachelor's or higher degree, 3,969 (57.1%) had a post-high school certificate or diploma, and 2,019 (29.0%) people exclusively held high school qualifications. The median income was $35,600, compared with $41,500 nationally. 573 people (8.2%) earned over $100,000 compared to 12.1% nationally. The employment status of those at least 15 was 3,291 (47.3%) full-time, 993 (14.3%) part-time, and 156 (2.2%) unemployed.

Individual statistical areas
Name	Area (km^{2})	Population	Density (per km^{2})	Dwellings	Median age	Median income
Cobden	3.68	1,593	433	696	41.2 years	$30,700
Blaketown	0.69	864	1,252	384	42.0 years	$33,500
Greymouth Central	2.64	999	378	429	54.7 years	$29,800
King Park	0.84	1,077	1,282	480	46.0 years	$29,600
Marsden	1.24	1,275	1.028	507	40.2 years	$39,700
Karoro	6.49	1,065	164	432	49.1 years	$45,000
Rutherglen-Camerons	12.12	1,458	120	567	45.7 years	$47,400
New Zealand					38.1 years	$41,500

=== Rural area ===
Greymouth Rural statistical area, which stretches between Greymouth and Lake Brunner, covers 338.07 km^{2} (130.53 sq mi). It had an estimated population of 840 as of June 2025, with a population density of 2.5 people per km^{2}.

Historical population for Greymouth Rural
Year	Pop.	±% p.a.
2006	564	—
2013	642	+1.87%
2018	669	+0.83%
2023	807	+3.82%
The 2006 population is for a larger area of 340.00 km^{2}. Source:

Greymouth Rural had a population of 807 in the 2023 New Zealand census, an increase of 138 people (20.6%) since the 2018 census, and an increase of 165 people (25.7%) since the 2013 census. There were 417 males and 387 females in 306 dwellings. 2.2% of people identified as LGBTIQ+. The median age was 48.0 years (compared with 38.1 years nationally). There were 153 people (19.0%) aged under 15 years, 90 (11.2%) aged 15 to 29, 441 (54.6%) aged 30 to 64, and 120 (14.9%) aged 65 or older.

People could identify as more than one ethnicity. The results were 92.6% European (Pākehā), 11.5% Māori, 0.7% Pasifika, 1.1% Asian, and 5.9% other, which includes people giving their ethnicity as "New Zealander". English was spoken by 98.5%, Māori by 1.5%, and other languages by 3.3%. No language could be spoken by 1.1% (e.g. too young to talk). New Zealand Sign Language was known by 0.4%. The percentage of people born overseas was 8.2, compared with 28.8% nationally.

Religious affiliations were 22.7% Christian, 0.4% Māori religious beliefs, 0.7% Buddhist, 1.1% New Age, and 1.1% other religions. People who answered that they had no religion were 65.1%, and 9.3% of people did not answer the census question.

Of those at least 15 years old, 66 (10.1%) people had a bachelor's or higher degree, 411 (62.8%) had a post-high school certificate or diploma, and 168 (25.7%) people exclusively held high school qualifications. The median income was $38,700, compared with $41,500 nationally. 57 people (8.7%) earned over $100,000 compared to 12.1% nationally. The employment status of those at least 15 was 333 (50.9%) full-time, 114 (17.4%) part-time, and 18 (2.8%) unemployed.

== Economy ==
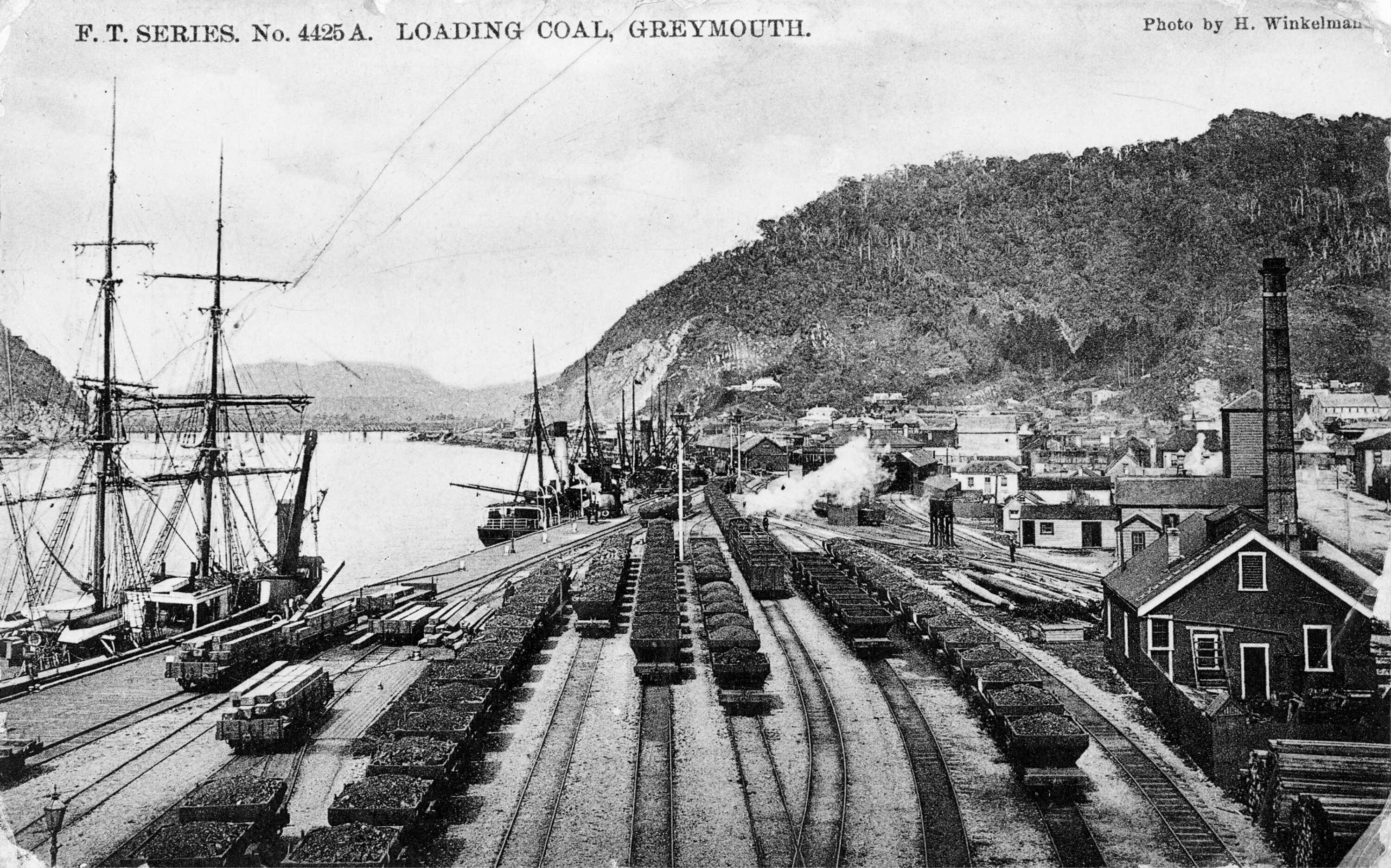
Coal being loaded onto ships at Greymouth in the 1900s

Greymouth was founded during the West Coast gold rush of the 1860s, but for 150 years after this its economy was based on coal mining and native timber forestry. These brought prosperity to the town which at one point had 47 hotels (today it has only six). In 2020 most of the coal mines have now closed yet at there were once ten coal mines in the Brunner Field. Brunner (1861–1935), Tyneside (1876–1954), Wallsend (1894–1932), Coal Pit Heath (1877–1893), Coolgardie (1894–1932), Pig and Whistle (1900–1944), South Brunner (1906–1907), St Kilda (1907–1921), North Brunner (1908–1920), Dobson (1920–1968). The 10 mines produced over 8 million tonnes of coal. The coal reserves in the district including - measured, indicated, and inferred total 164 million tonnes. Fishing has long been important to the town, despite the fact that the entrance to the Grey River has two notoriously dangerous sandbars; an inner and outer bar.

Beginning in the 1960s, forestry and coal mining began to decline on the West Coast. The planned opening of the Pike River Mine in early 2008 spurred new investments in upgrading port facilities at the town. The opening of the new mine, as well as the planned Spring Creek mine, was called the biggest investment happening in the area for a hundred years; coal barges travelling to and from reshipment facilities in Taranaki would have carried containerised cargo to the town and saved the port from closure. On 19 November 2010, there was an explosion at the Pike River Mine, trapping 29 miners. Attempts to rescue the trapped miners were repeatedly delayed due to high levels of methane gas, until a second explosion on 24 November dashed all hope of survival for the miners. Pike River Coal went into receivership in the wake of the disaster and was purchased by Solid Energy, which closed the Spring Creek Mine in 2012 with the loss of 220 jobs and went into voluntary administration in August 2015.

After the decline in coal mining and forestry, the West Coast economy has become increasingly dependent on ecotourism. Thousands of coal mining jobs had declined to just 60, and hundreds of tourism jobs had replaced them. During Greymouth's boom years, much of the centre of town was built up in brick Art Deco building on leased land in the Mawhera Reserve. This land was administered for many years by the Department of Maori Affairs, but was returned to the control of the iwi in 1976. At that time Mawhera Inc's total assets were worth $2m, but had grown to $123m by 2018. Mawhera Inc is now the town's largest landlord, with 1600 shareholders. After regulations were tightened following the 2010 Canterbury earthquake, many of Greymouth's heritage buildings were found to be unsafe, and the combination of earthquake-strengthening costs and being on lease land makes many of them uneconomic to restore and occupy.

Greymouth is also known for its pounamu ("greenstone", a form of jade) carving industry which goes back to Māori origins. The town's local brewery, Monteith's, has produced beer since 1868 which is now sold nationwide.

== Education ==
Greymouth has several state primary schools offering education up to year 8, and Greymouth High School and John Paul II High School providing secondary education. There are also state-integrated Catholic primary and secondary schools.

Tai Poutini Polytechnic has its head office based in Greymouth. It also has campuses in Auckland, Christchurch, Hokitika, Reefton, Wānaka and Westport.

== Arts and culture ==
=== Left Bank Art Gallery ===
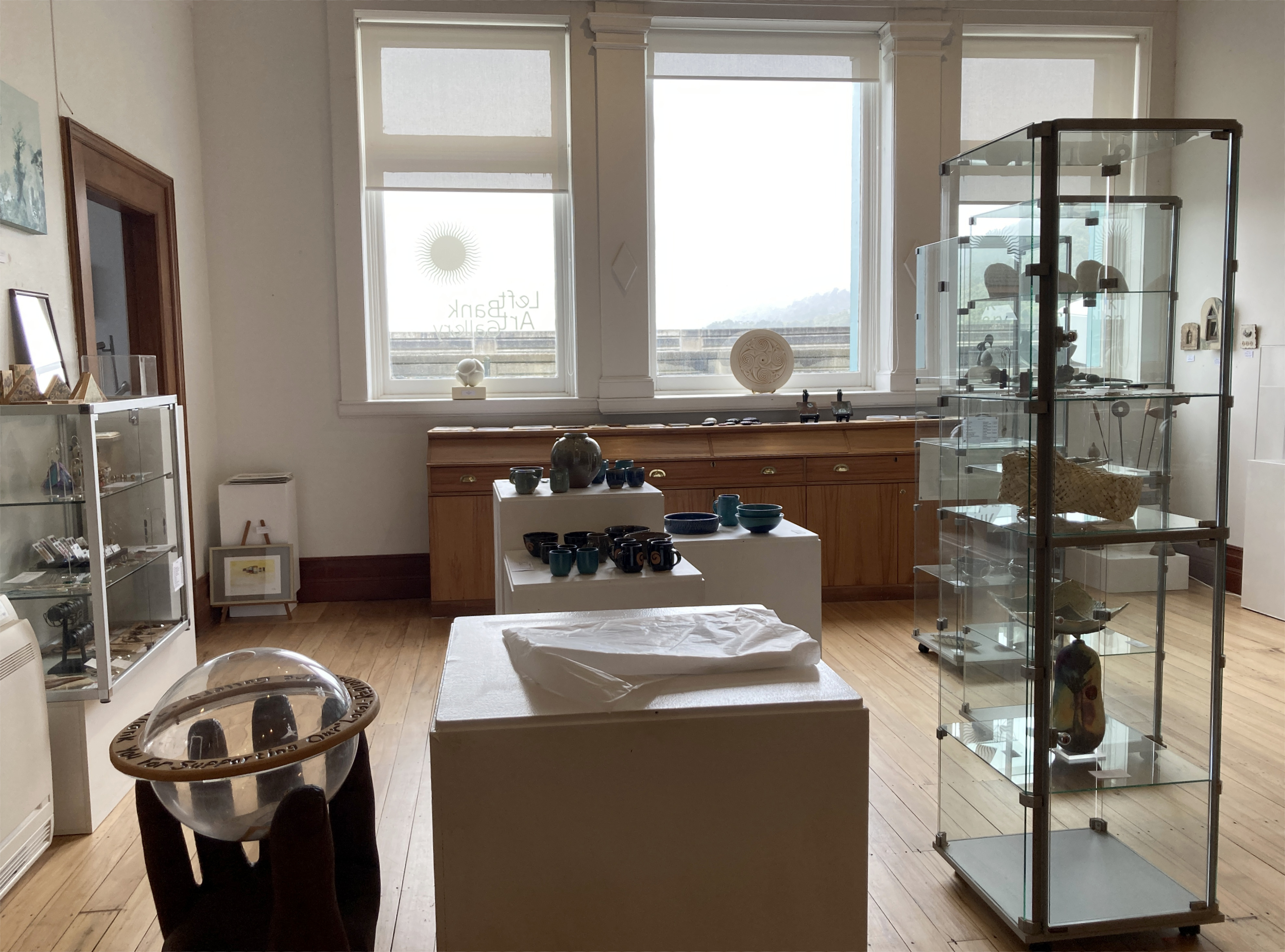
Left Bank Art Gallery, interior

Founded in 1992, the Left Bank Art Gallery in Greymouth is located in the former Bank of New Zealand building on the left bank of the Grey River. It is operated by the West Coast Society of the Arts and exhibits the works of artists from Karamea to Haast and holds the National Pounamu Collection.

=== Art in the Park ===
In 2007 the first Art in the Park event was organised in Greymouth at Dixon Park by Linda and Ashley Morley, South Africans living in New Zealand. They brought the concept from South Africa. In 2008 inclement weather meant the organisers sought an alternative venue that was more sheltered from rain. The 2009 Art in the Park was held at Shantytown, and remained there for a couple of years before locating to the Greymouth High School gymnasium.

=== Greymouth Operatic Society ===
In 1944 the Greymouth Operatic Society was formalised, following a number of successful patriotic reviews and concerts during the war years. The first production in 1945 was "The Country Girl" with Beverley Patterson in the lead role of 'Marjorie Joy'. In 2021 the Greymouth Operatic Society is a thriving operation, providing the opportunity for local performers, musician and stage crews to learn all things theatre. The aim of the Society is to support, educate, and nurture local talent.

== Suburbs ==
- Inner suburbs:
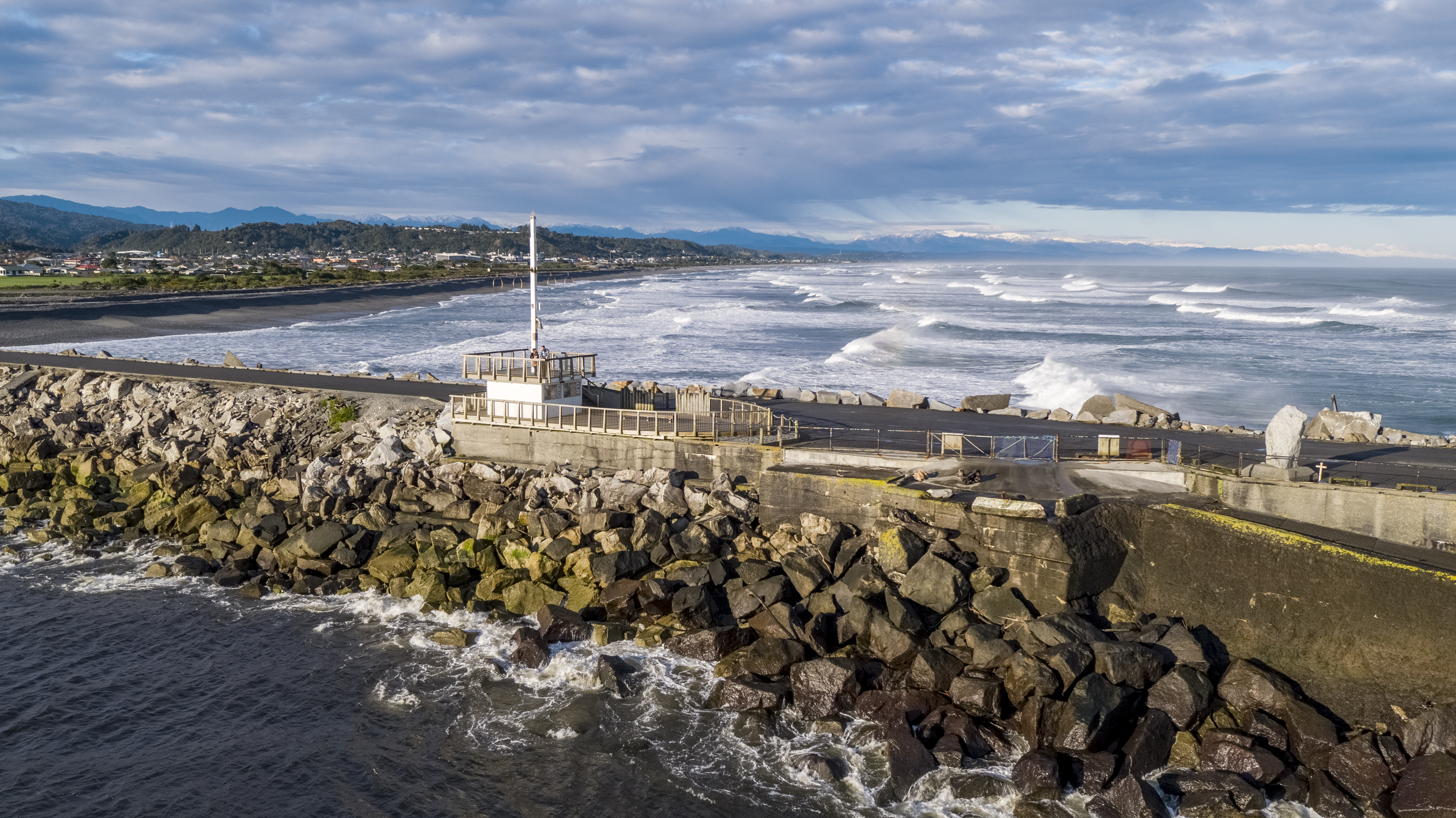
  - Southern Breakwater in Blaketown
    Cobden – reflects the English origins and political awareness of its founders. Many of the streets are named for English political rebels and reformers of their times. Richard Cobden (1804–1865) was a radical politician involved in repealing the Corn Laws, emancipating the worker and encouraging free trade. Some of his contemporaries such as John Bright and Edward Cardwell also have streets named after them. Other more recent streets honour some of Cobden's significant citizens.
  - Greymouth Central – Māwhera to Māori but renamed 'Grey' to honour the then Governor of New Zealand Sir George Grey. The earliest street names honour pioneer residents, explorers and prominent local Māori, while others pay tribute to English literary figures and politicians. Later developments recognise the achievements of local residents who contributed significantly to civic and local body affairs.
  - Blaketown – named for its founder, Isaac Blake who, according to his contemporaries, although unable to read was a wily and ambitious character. He came as a gold prospector but soon saw that there was more money to be made as a trader and storekeeper. In its early days, Blaketown was bigger than Greymouth. Blaketown shows the influence of early politicians in its street names.
  - Wharemoa
  - Karoro - the meaning in Māori is 'blacked-backed gull' or 'seagull'. The streets of Karoro, which are mostly the result of more recent subdivision, reflect the names of developers or landowners in the area. Some are named for geographic features and native trees.
- Outer suburbs:
  - South Beach
  - Paroa – the meaning in Māori is 'long fortified village'. The area around the Saltwater Creek was so named in 1866 when upwards of two thousand men were prospecting in the area. The streets of Paroa are mostly named for prominent citizens and landowners.
  - Rutherglen
  - Gladstone
  - Camerons

== Notable people ==
- Mary Anderson (1887–1966), politician and founding member of the Greymouth branch of the New Zealand Labour Party
- Julie Christie (born 1962), television producer who grew up in Greymouth
- Paul Coll (born 1992), squash player born in Greymouth
- Arthur Guinness (1846–1913), lawyer and politician
- Kevin Hague (born 1960), politician and chief executive who lives in Greymouth
- Arthur Harding (1878–1947), rugby union player for Wales and Great Britain, was a station-master at Greymouth
- Amy Johnston (1872–1908), dentist born in Greymouth
- Tony Kokshoorn (born 1955), politician, activist and publisher born and lives in Greymouth
- Janice M. Morse (born 1945), medical researcher who grew up in Greymouth
- Bill Pearson (1922–2002), writer born in Greymouth
- Mark Priest (born 1961), cricketer born in Greymouth
- Gaylene Preston (born 1947), filmmaker born in Greymouth
- Yvonne Rust (1922–2002), artist and art teacher
- Blair Tennent (1898–1976), politician who grew up in Greymouth
- Leigh Hart (born 1970), comedian and radio announcer born in Greymouth
- Jackie Thomas (born 1990), singer born in Greymouth

== Notable buildings ==
- Bank of New Zealand (1 Tainui Street), now home of the Leftbank Art Gallery
- Revington's Hotel (45–49 Tainui Street), now demolished
- Grey Harbour Board building (1884)
- Regent Theatre (1937)
- The Greymouth Railway Station is included in an historic precinct, which also incorporates the signal box, the former Government buildings, former State Insurance office.
- Makura Croquet Club, the Makura Croquet Club building was constructed in 1911 and is registered as a category 2 building with Heritage New Zealand.
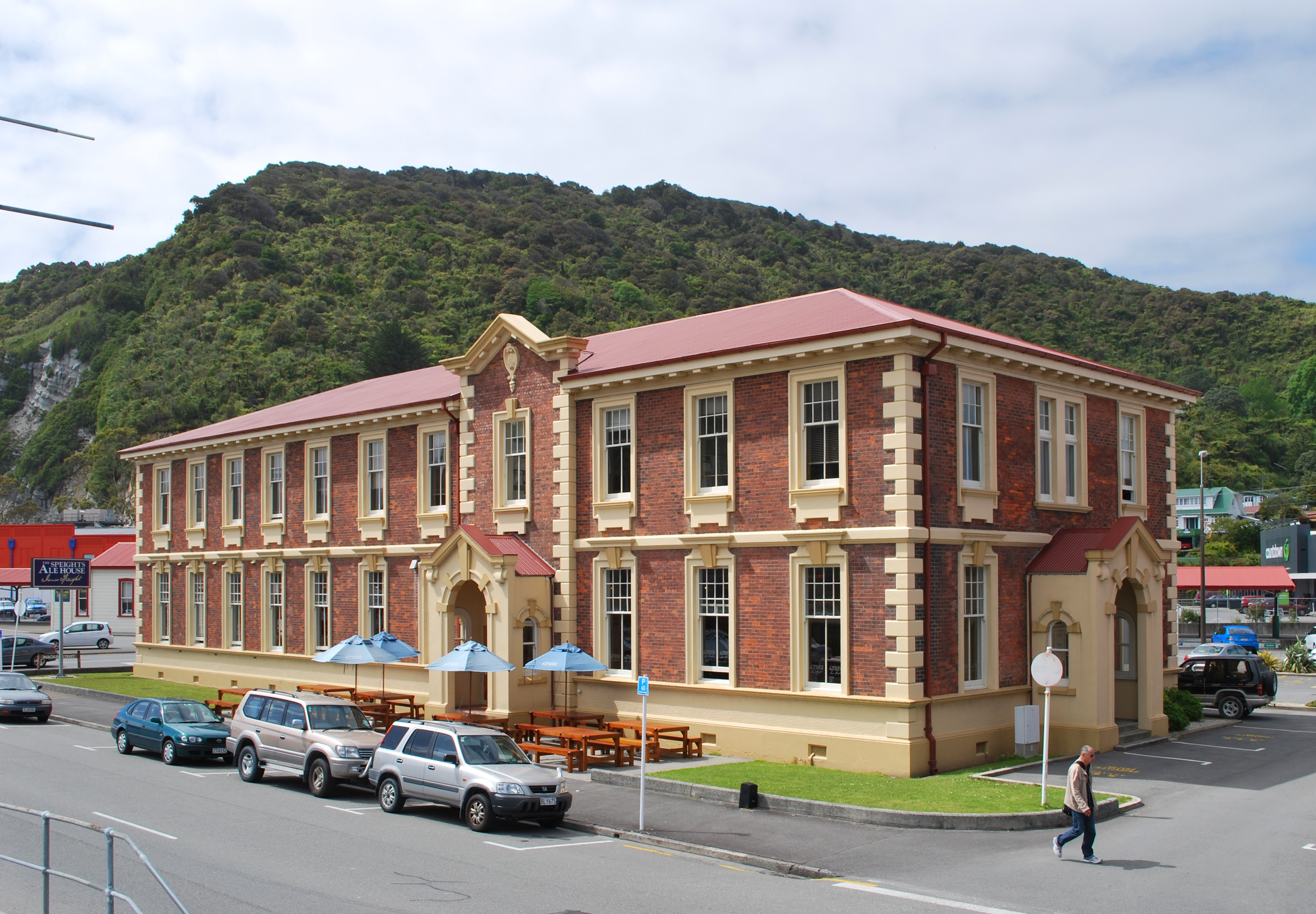
The former Greymouth Government buildings

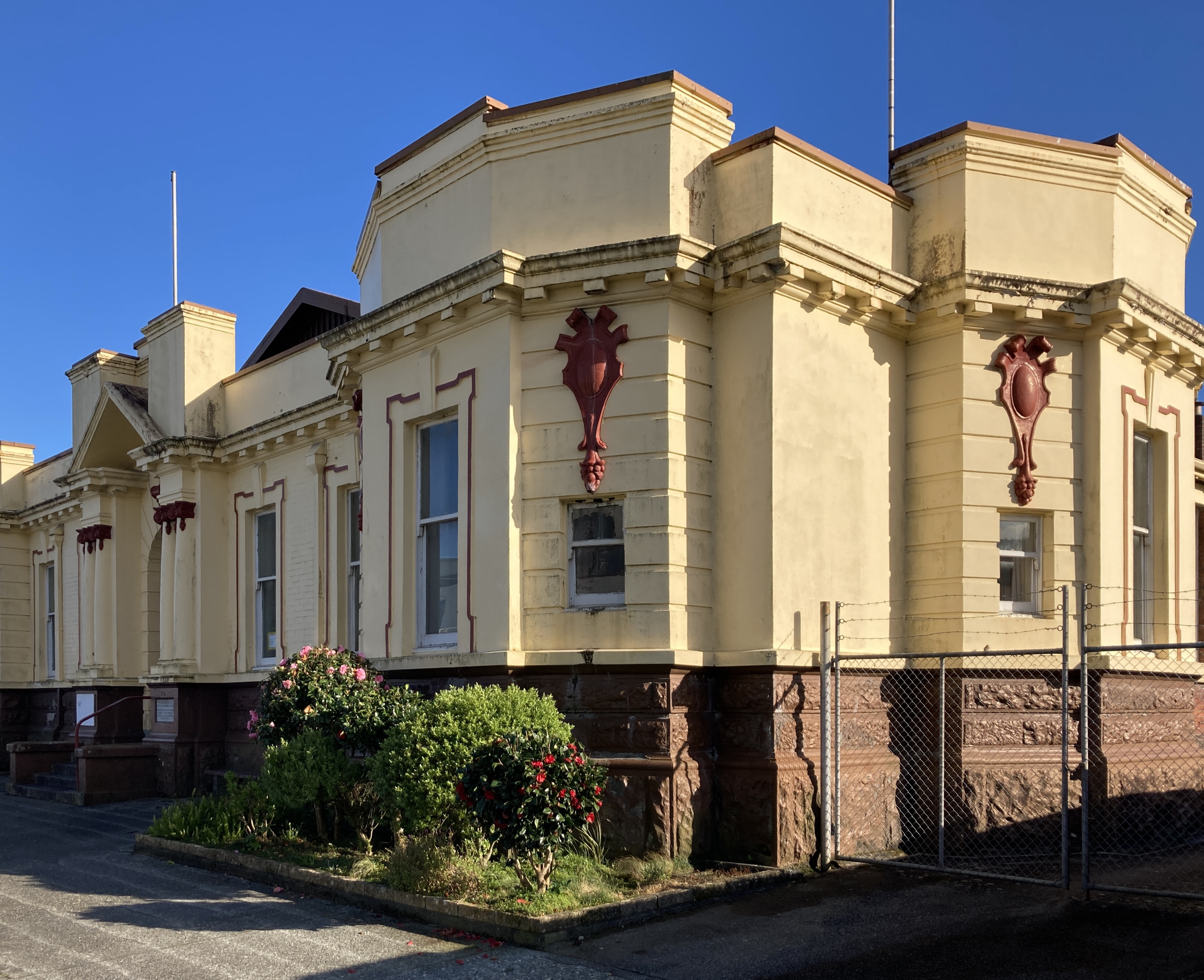
Greymouth Courthouse building

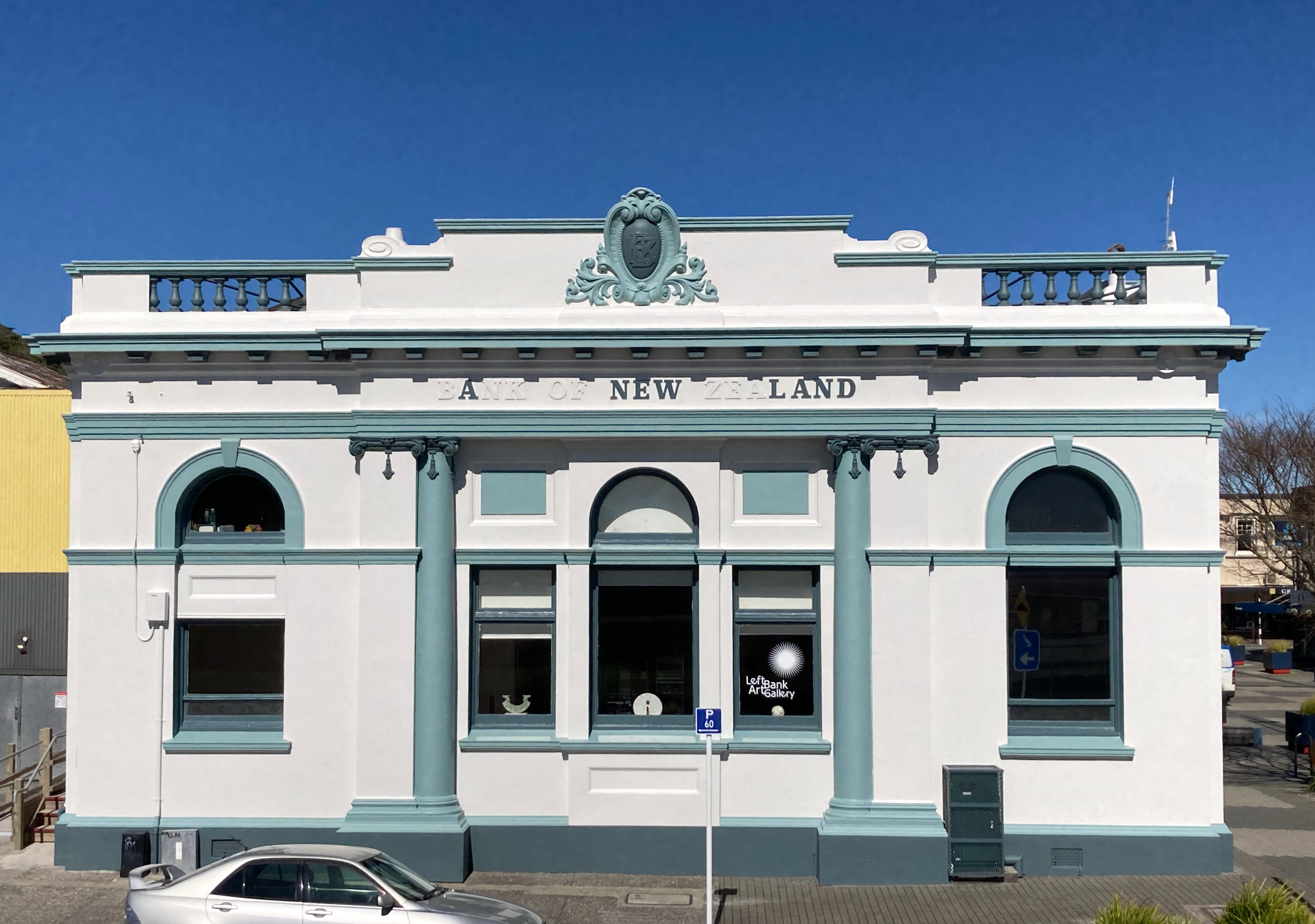
Left Bank Art Gallery, in the old Bank of New Zealand building

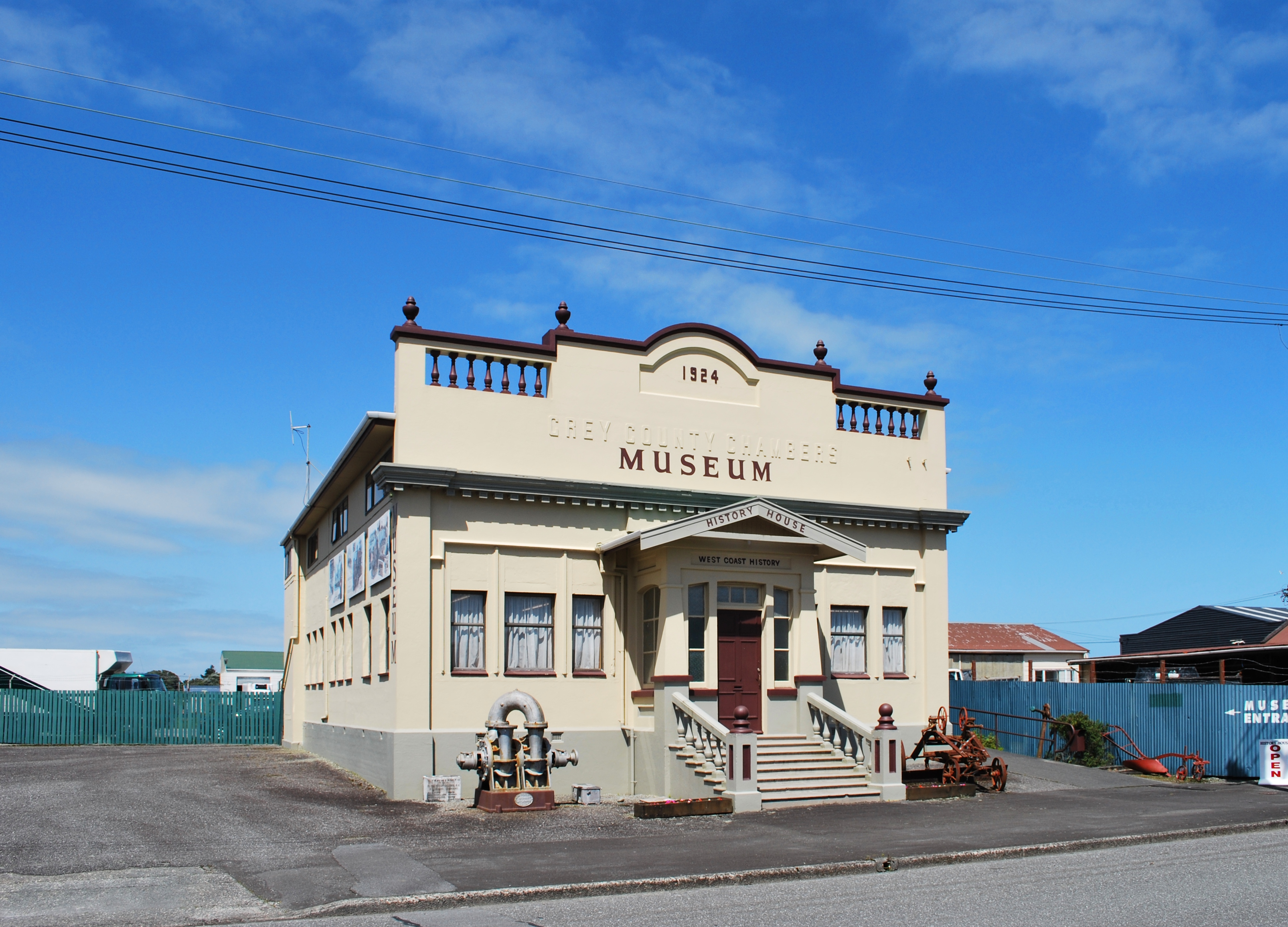
History House museum, the former Grey County Chambers

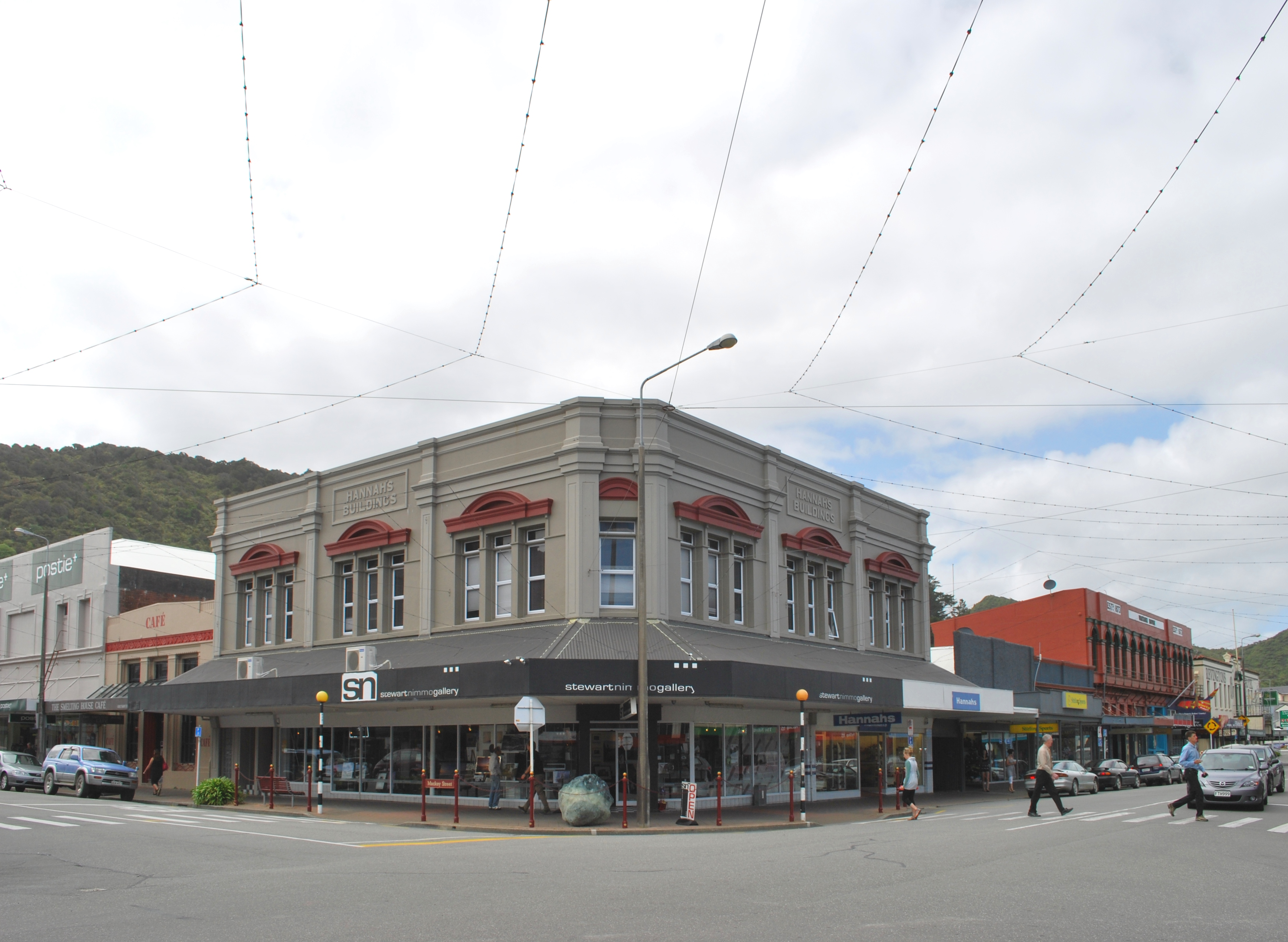
Hannah's building

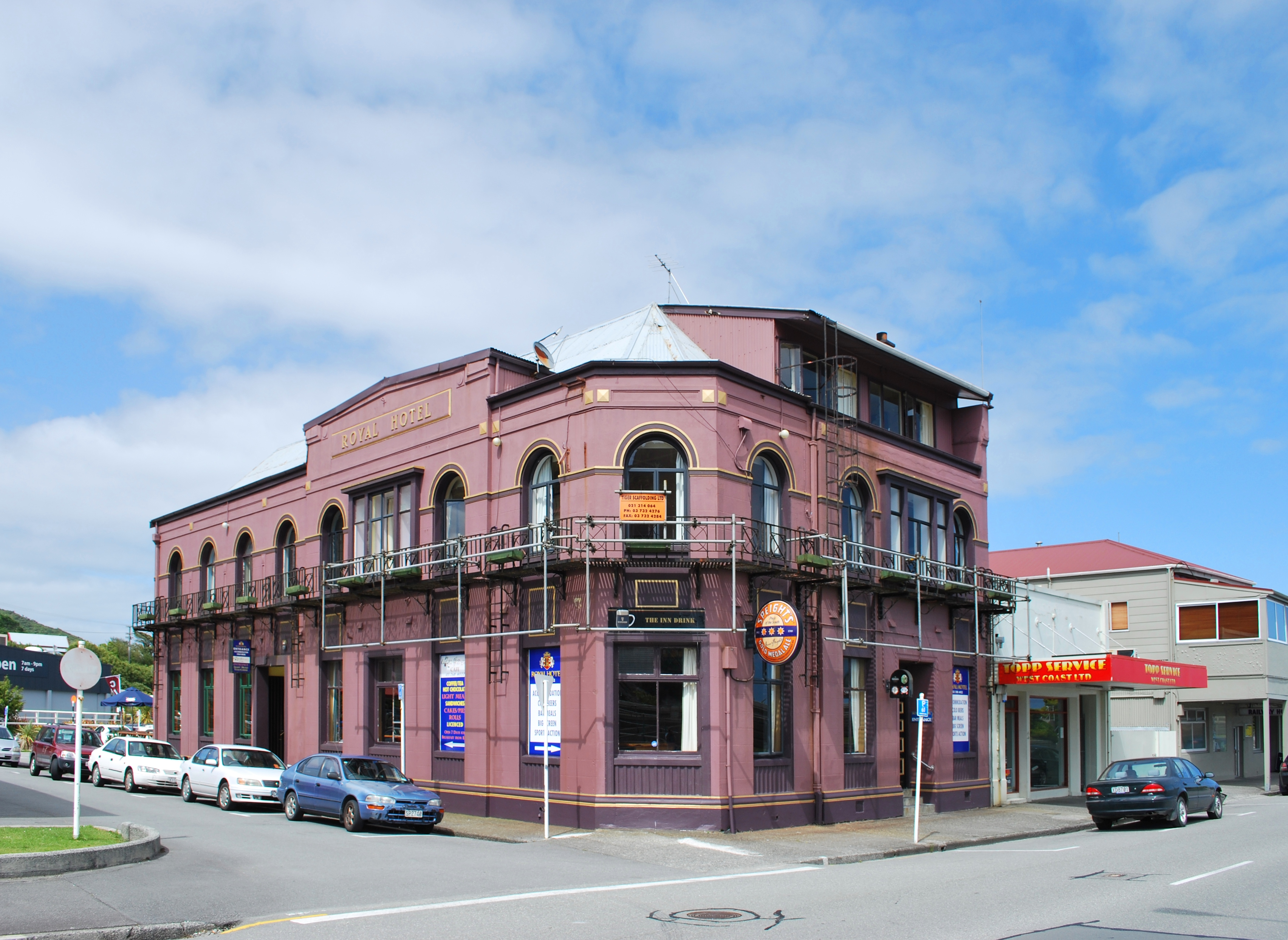
Greymouth Royal Hotel

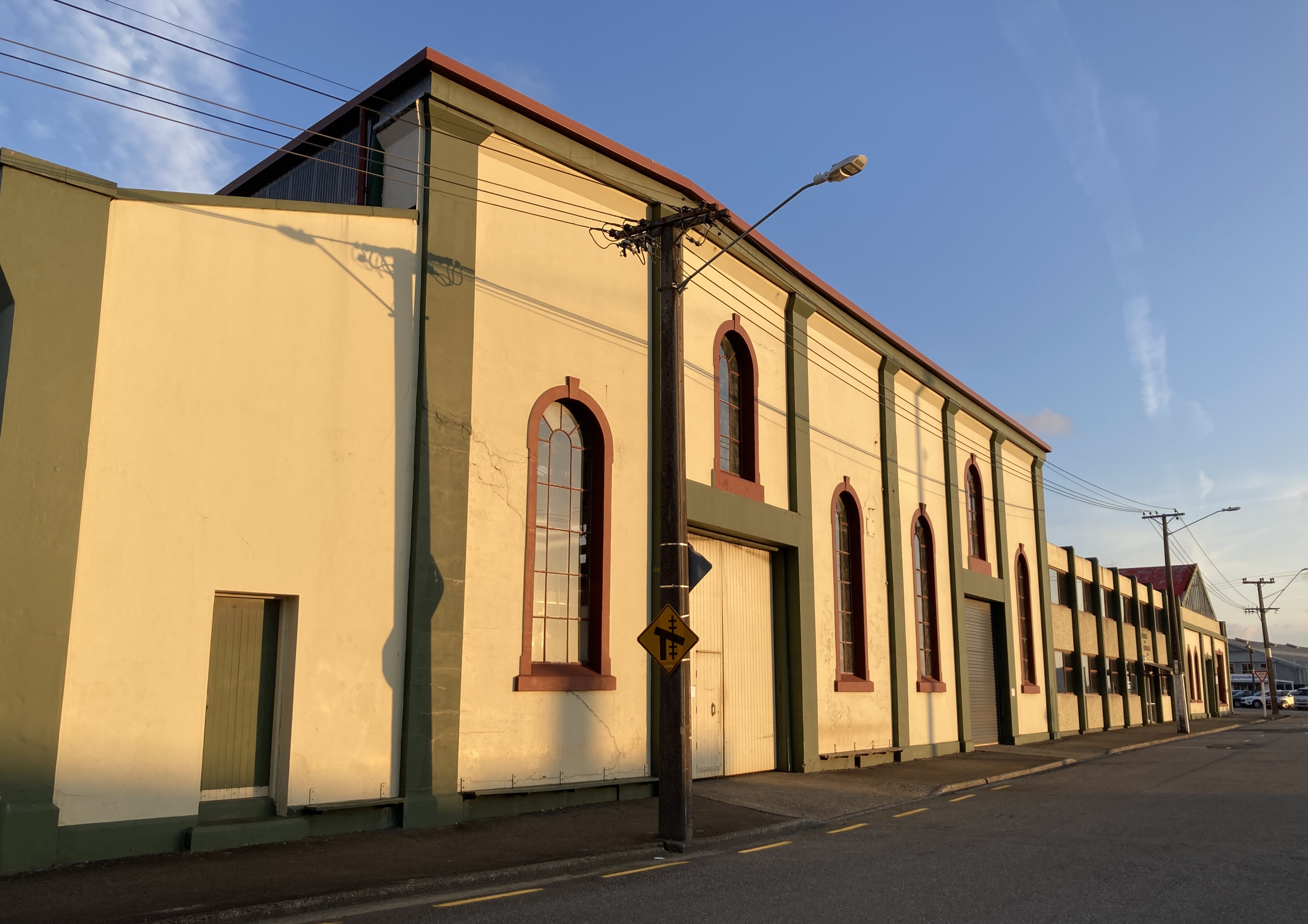
Dispatch & Garlick Foundry

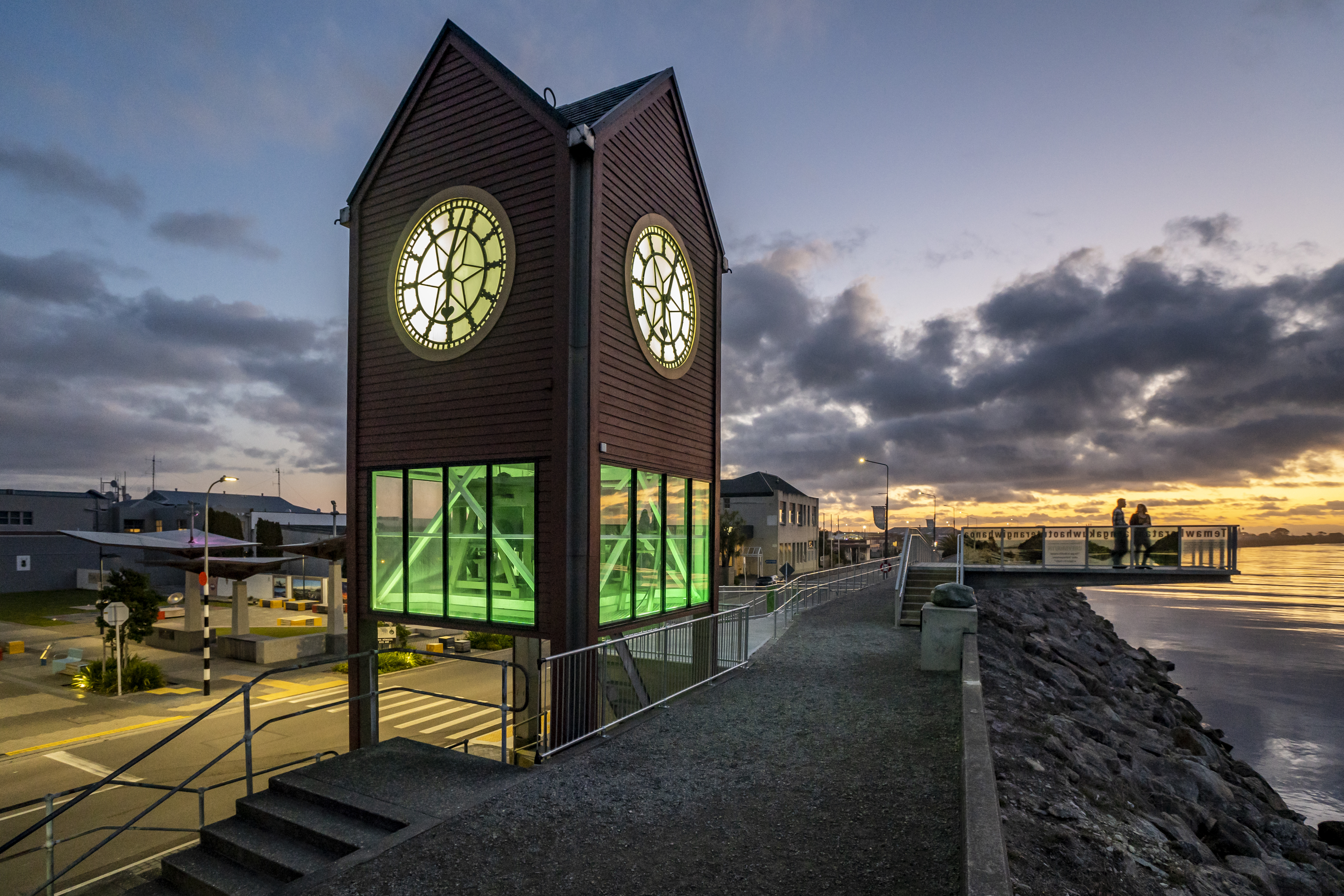
Town clock

== See also ==
- Regions of New Zealand
- Territorial authorities of New Zealand.
