= Mount Axford =

Mountain in New Zealand

- Location within New Zealand

Highest point
- Elevation: 1,720 m (5,640 ft)
- Listing: Mountains of New Zealand
- Coordinates: 45°24′40″S 167°26′28″E

Geography
- Country: New Zealand
- Island: South Island
- Region: Southland
- Protected area: Fiordland National Park
- Parent range: Kepler Mountains, Southern Alps

Mount Axford is a mountain in Fiordland National Park, New Zealand. In 2021, the previously unnamed mountain was officially named after Sir William Ian Axford, a notable space scientist from New Zealand. The mountain does not have a known original Māori name.
