= Axford, Washington =

Unincorporated community in Washington, US

- Unincorporated community
- Location within Washington (state) Location within the United States
- Coordinates: 47°11′39″N 123°56′47″W
- Country: United States
- State: Washington
- County: Grays Harbor
- Established: 1888
- Elevation: 141 ft (43 m)
- Time zone: UTC-8 (Pacific (PST))
  - Summer (DST): UTC-7 (PDT)
- Area code(s): 360, 564
- GNIS feature ID: 1530570

Axford is an unincorporated community in Grays Harbor County, in the U.S. state of Washington.

== History ==
A post office called Axford was established in 1888, and remained in operation until 1904. The community was named after Mr. Axford, a pioneer settler.
