= Ian Axford =

New Zealand space scientist (1933–2010)

Sir Ian Axford
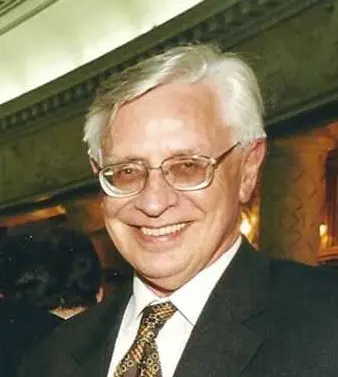
- Axford in 2000
- Born: William Ian Axford; 2 January 1933; Dannevirke, New Zealand
- Died: 13 March 2010 (aged 77); Napier, New Zealand
- Awards: Rutherford Medal (Royal Society of New Zealand) 1994; Chapman Medal (RAS) 1994; Fellow of the Royal Society
- Scientific career
- Workplaces: Cornell University (1963–1967); University of California, San Diego (1967–1974); Max Planck Institute for Aeronomy (1974–2001); Victoria University of Wellington (1982–1985)

Sir William Ian Axford FRS (2 January 1933 – 13 March 2010) was a New Zealand space scientist who was director of Germany's Max Planck Institute for Aeronomy from 1974 to 1990. Axford's research was focused on the interaction of the Sun with the magnetic field of Earth (magnetosphere) or the interstellar medium (heliosphere).

== Career ==
Axford studied at Canterbury University in Christchurch for his double bachelor's degrees in science and engineering, followed by a double Master's in science with first class honours and in engineering with distinction, then undertook doctoral studies at the University of Manchester and received his PhD in 1960.

After a year at the University of Cambridge in 1960, where he played two matches of first-class cricket for the Cambridge University Cricket Club, Axford then joined the Defence Research Board of Canada, where he published one of his most cited papers: A unifying theory of high-latitude geophysical phenomena and geomagnetic storms, in 1961. He became a professor of physics and astronomy at Cornell University, Ithaca, New York in 1963. He later moved to the University of California, San Diego.

Axford became a director at the Max Planck Institute for Aeronomy (since renamed the Max Planck Institute for Solar System Research) in 1974. He held that position, with a short break in which he was Vice Chancellor of the Victoria University of Wellington from 1982 to 1985, until his retirement in 2001. The institute participated in the international missions Giotto to Halley's Comet, solar observatories Ulysses and SOHO while Axford was director of the institute. The science of all three missions had a strong connection to the activity of the Sun: SOHO and Ulysses monitored solar activity, and the Giotto mission was able to monitor the interaction of solar particles with Halley's Comet. Most of Axford's research was associated with the magnetosphere and the heliosphere.

== Personal life ==
Axford married Joy Lowry in January 1955 and the couple had four children. Axford died at his home in Napier on 13 March 2010, aged 77, following a long illness. His wife, (Catherine) Joy (Lowry), Lady Axford, died in 2025.

== Honours ==
Axford received several awards, for example the John Adam Fleming Medal in 1972, the Tsiolkovsky Medal in 1987, the Chapman Medal, and the Rutherford Medal in 1994. In 1995 he was named New Zealander of the Year. In the 1996 New Year Honours, Axford was appointed as a Knight Bachelor, for services to science. Since 1986 he was a Fellow of the Royal Society in London and since 1993 he was an honorary Fellow of the Royal Society of New Zealand.

On his 60th birthday, the asteroid 5097 Axford was named in his honour at an astronomical symposium in Germany.

In 2021, Mount Axford, a mountain in Fiordland National Park, was named in his honour.
