= Graeme Axford =

New Zealand Activist

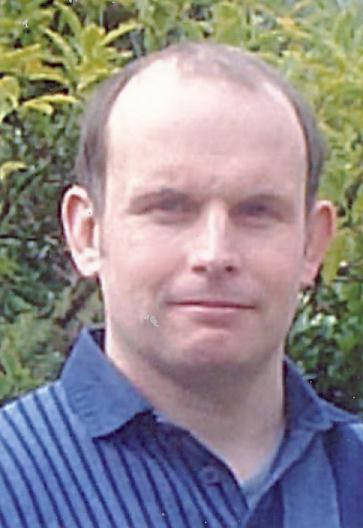
Graeme in 2010

Graeme Axford is a New Zealand human rights, disability, and consumer advocate. He was born in Greymouth, New Zealand.

He has helped over 7,000 people in their battles with various government bureaucracies. In 2012, he received a Kiwibank Local Hero Medal. In 2019, he was nominated again.

Between 2011 and 2021, Axford submitted 7 petitions to the New Zealand Parliament.

== Challenges ==
Axford was born with severe dyslexia. This was only diagnosed when he was an adult. Life was a constant struggle for both him and his parents. His teachers saw him as being 'slow', and a 'no hoper'. He left school at the earliest possible opportunity.

Even after he qualified as a social worker and became involved in community development and education, he was seen as having low intelligence because of his poor reading and writing skills.

== Achievements ==
In October 2012, Axford featured in an article in the New Zealand Herald regarding complaints against the Child, Youth and Family (New Zealand) (CYF).

The result of this was "The White Paper for Vulnerable Children" which was a response to user criticisms of the Child Youth and Family (CYF) complaints process. Page 9 of this paper read "The petition of Mr Graeme Axford to the 2009 Parliamentary Social Services Committee yielded this response: "In our view, establishing a completely independent complaints mechanism would improve the external perception of the review process". In August 2013 Axford was featured in a Radio New Zealand article in relation to complaints against the Child, Youth and Family (CYF) once again.

In December 2015, Axford published his e-book "You be the Judge". In April 2016, Axford published his e-book "When Child, Youth and Family (CYF) visit, what to consider".

Axford is co-author of 'Differently Abled, Taking a Stand, Making a Difference. The Graeme Axford Story". published in April 2020.

Co-author Jane Bissell is author of two books "Welcome to the Amazon Club", and "The Pink Party". She specializes in assisting authors in the compilation of their own stories. She is a member of the NZ Society of Authors.

The book was reviewed by Steve Taylor (B.Couns., B.AOD, PG Dip. Applied Social Practice), Director, Relationship Matters Ltd. who posed the question "What happens if a statutory organisation, with overt, unrestrained, and monumental power to intervene in families and society, routinely acts in a way that is beyond the rule of law, and remains free of the consequences of doing so?"

Following his protests against the government body, Child, Youth and Family (CYF) In December 2011, in June 2017 he won a NZD$15,000 payout after years of challenges to the Privacy Commissioner and Human Rights Review Tribunal.

In June 2017, Axford supported the Pir River families in their campaign for justice. He not only stopped the mine being sealed but also entered the drift. Axford attend the road blockade protests and become admin on Facebook "StandWithPike" and "Supporting the recovery of our Pike". He ended up being trolled and put on a gay webpage for his efforts.

In July 2017, Axford featured in an article relating to his complaint to the Independent Police Conduct Authority (IPCA) of New Zealand about New Zealand MP Todd Barclay.

In 2020, Axford featured in several articles in the West Coast Messenger.

In 2022, Axford was the subject of the book "Congratulations – You have Dyslexia" by Mike Styles. (ISBN 978-0-473-61176-7). Mike Styles works as a teacher, researcher and advocate in the field of dyslexia, literacy, and numeracy.

In April and May 2022, Axford participated in the New Zealand Open Government Partnership NZ Workshops on potential National Action Plan 4 Commitments. The purpose of these workshops was for Expert Advisory Panel, civil society groups, and government agencies to work on the ideas collected through public consultation to identify, and scope potential fledgling commitments for NAP4.

In August 2022, Axford was interviewed by the Otago Daily Times in an article entitled "Slip stopping police getting to Omoto quickly". Also in August, he featured in an article regarding Greypower saying rate increases are forcing some homeowners to consider selling.

Axford is on the board of the Blackball Museum.
