= 1967 New Zealand bravery awards =

The 1967 New Zealand bravery awards were announced via a special honours list dated 8 May 1967, and recognised five people for brave conduct and acts of gallantry following an explosion at the Strongman coal mine on 19 January 1967.

== British Empire Medal (BEM) ==
Civil division, for gallantry

- Archibald Auld – of Greymouth
- Wilfred Boardman – of Dunollie
- George William Ewen – of Runanga
- Ronald James Gibb – of Dunollie
- Richard Francis Thomas – of Greymouth
