= Dispatch & Garlick =

Mechanical engineering company

Coordinates: 14.7836889°N 60.9984647°W

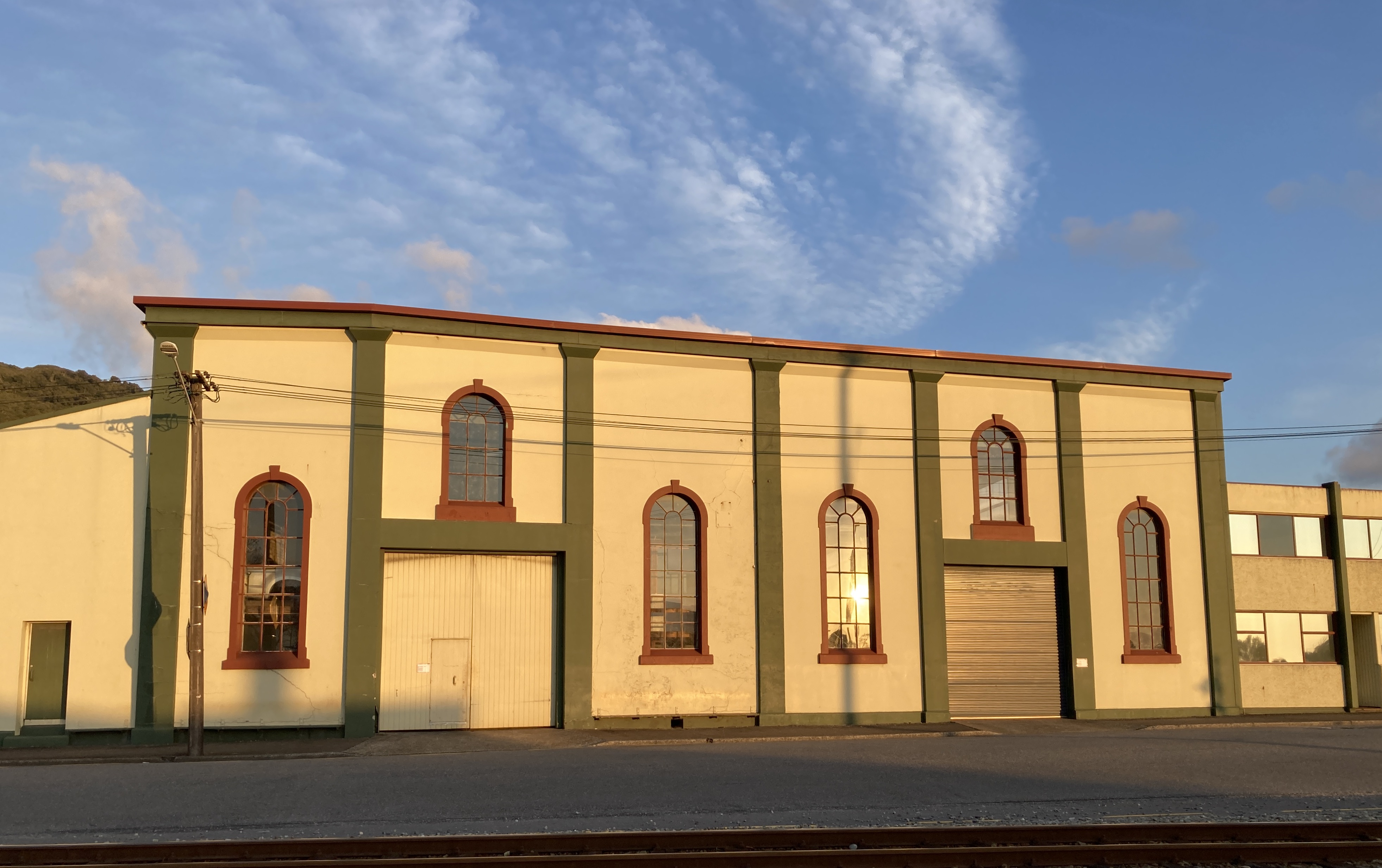
Dispatch & Garlick, Lord Street, Greymouth

Dispatch & Garlick Ltd is a mechanical engineering company specialising in dairy, water and wastewater systems in Greymouth, New Zealand.

== History ==
=== Foundation ===
The company was founded on 5 August 1873 as Dispatch Iron Works. The name derives from a paddle steamer tug used in the port of Greymouth. Owner of the ironworks was the Scottish engineer John Sewell, who had exported the Dispatch 1869 from England to New Zealand. He worked part-time as an engineer on the Dispatch and carried out various technical activities and occasional repairs.

=== Growth ===
The quartz mining boom around Reefton and the coal mining activities in Brunnerton led to full order books right after setting-up. The Dispatch Foundry Company Limited was thus founded in July 1875 with a starting capital of £12,000 to invest in the required machines and facilities. The company was very successful and paid a dividend of 10% in 1877, which was maintained in subsequent years.

Up to the 25th anniversary, Dispatch completed a total of more than 8,000 ft (2,400 m) of water pipes for the Humphrey's Gully Company, 100 tonnes of girders for the Otira Gorge Bridge, ten-head stamper batteries, sets of joints and crossings for the NZ Railways. At the time, Dispatch had an average of 60 employees.

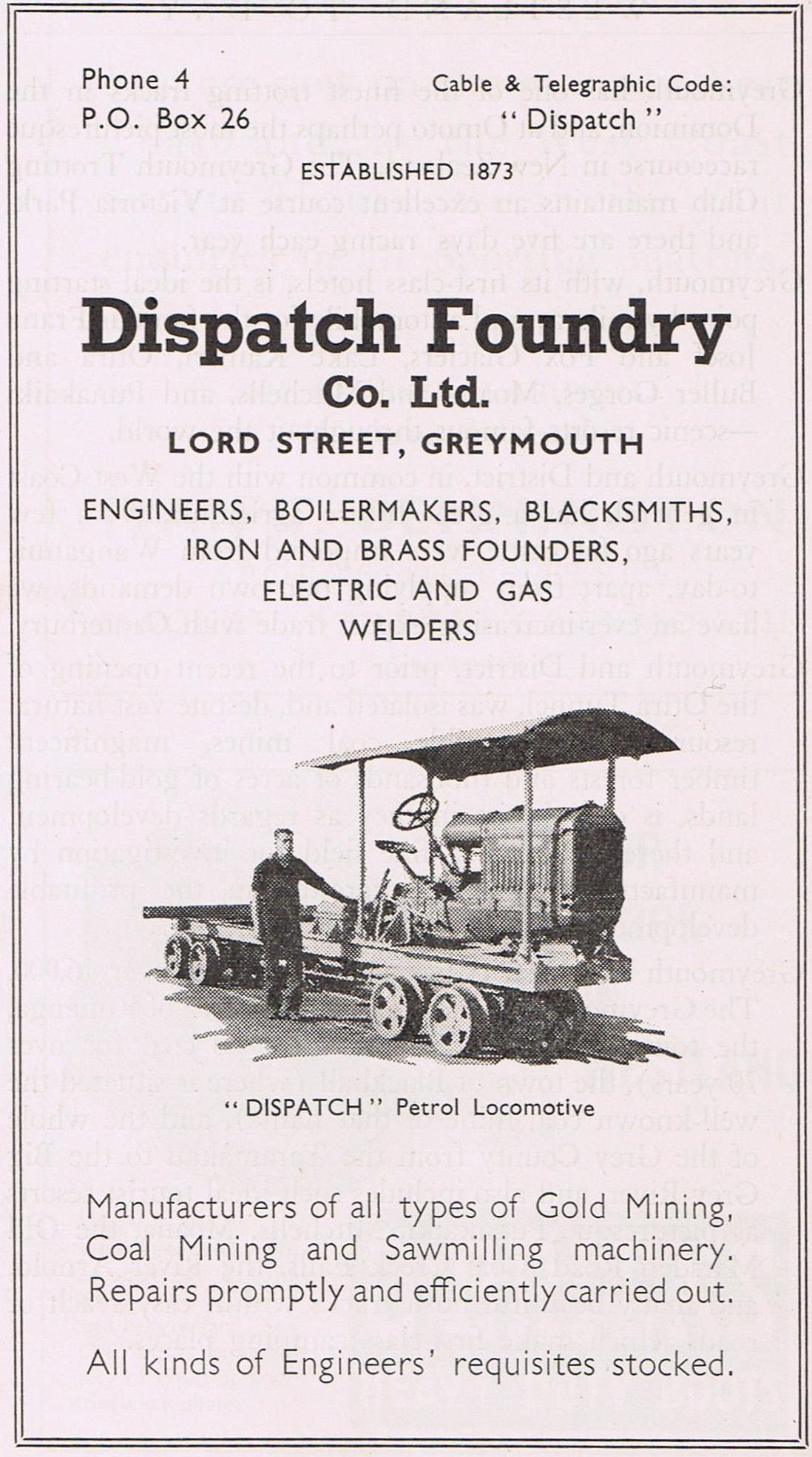
Advertisement from 1940

In 1906 a telephone with the telephone number 4 was installed in the foundry. In 1910 the foundry employed 12 founders, 23 fitters, 12 blacksmiths, 20 blacksmiths, 2 modelers, 8 workers and 4 office workers. 9 apprentices were employed in the workshop.

=== Change of ownership ===
In 1975, the company changed its name to Dispatch Engineering Ltd which specialised in timber winches, pressure vessels and gold screens as well as general engineering and foundry work. Dave McMillan, Managing Director of RA Garlick Ltd. and his business partner Francis Zampese bought the buildings and facilities of Dispatch Engineering Ltd. in 1995. In the 1990s, at the dawn of the New Zealand Dairy Boom, dairy machines were produced using the newly acquired facilities and buildings. In 1995, Dispatch & Garlick Ltd was founded reflecting the history of Dispatch and the customer base of RA Garlick Ltd.

The company has currently^{(2008)} approximately 50 employees in various fields of mechanical engineering, including a foundry with an induction furnace for 500 kg gray cast iron, carbon steels and alloy steels, a workshop for models, sheet metal work and pressure vessels of all kinds and an X-ray system for nondestructive material testing. It has an assembly and machine hall with boring machines up to 3.6 m diameter and lathes for parts with up to 6 m length or 3 m diameter. The workshop building, which still has its own railway siding, consists of two 95-metre-long fields, each served by a 10-ton overhead crane.

== Locomotives ==
The steam locomotives built at the beginning of the 20th century were unusual in many ways. Initially, steam winches were manufactured, which were adapted by a chain drive on the axles for transporting them on mainly wooden rails. As a rule, a boiler was mounted at one end of a frame and a winch at the other end. The two-cylinder winch motor powered a cable drum via a crankshaft, which also drove the 30 degrees downwardly inclined intermediate shaft via a bevel gear. Via a gearbox with sliding bevel pinions different ratios could be selected. Complicated bevel and spur gears transmitted the torque to the axles. Because of this complexity, the average lifespan was only 11 years. Later, Dispatch developed rail tractors, with which it became market leader in this market sector.

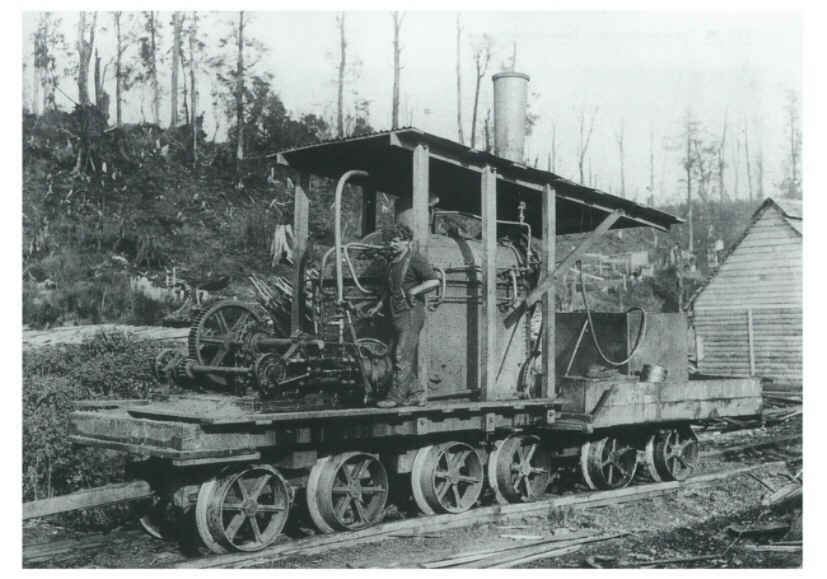
Early Dispatch loco of 1904, used from 1907 in Ngahere

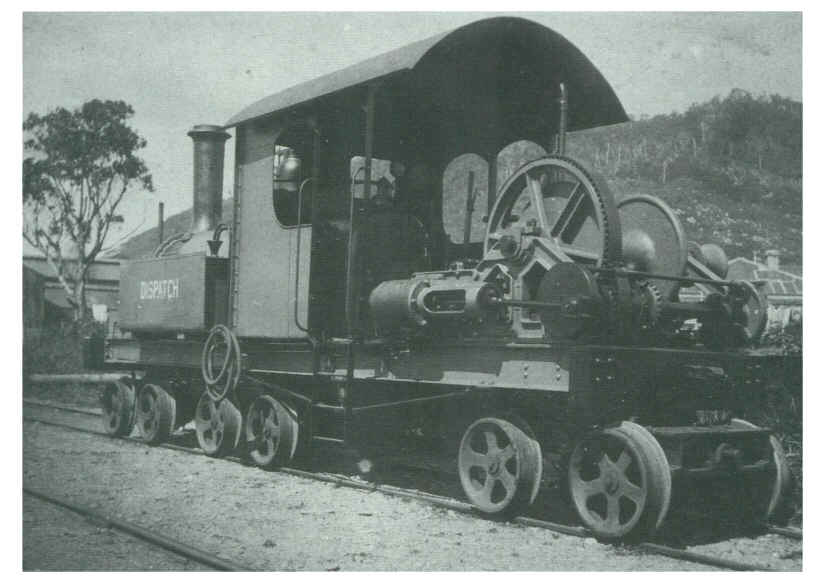
Loco of 1913 at Midland Sawmilling Co. in Camerons

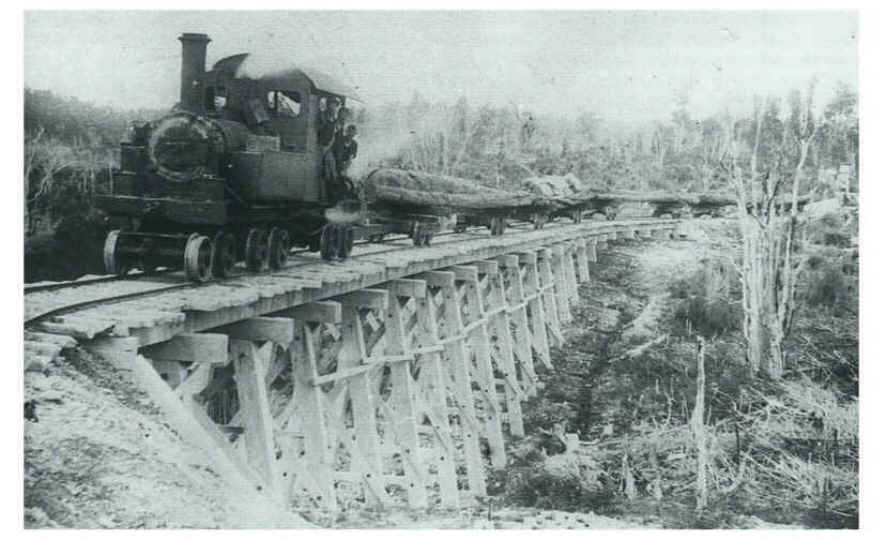
No. 140 of 1913 at Westland Sawmilling Co., Camerons

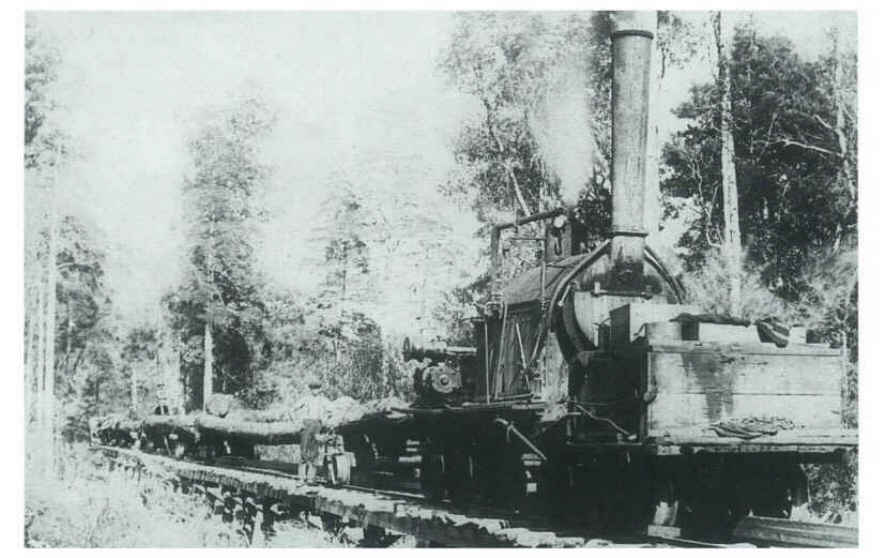
Unidentified Dispatch locomotive

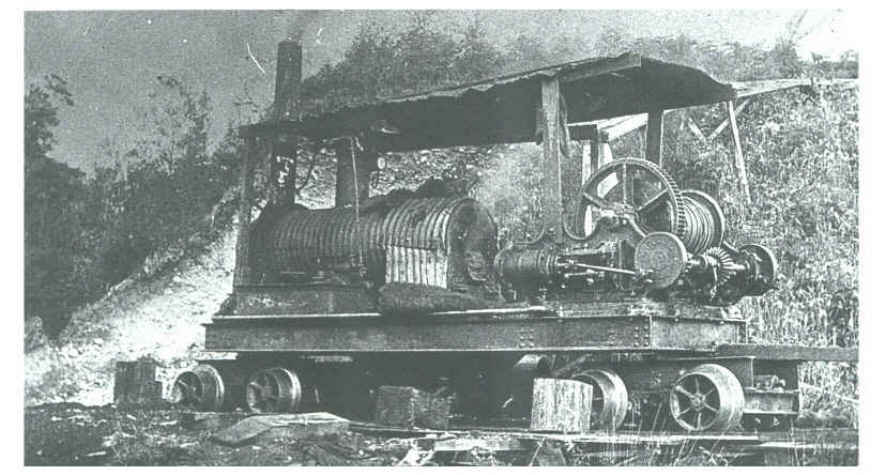
No. W2D160 since 1915 at Perotti & Co. Mawheraiti

== See also ==
- List of historic places in Grey District
