= List of historic places in Grey District =

This list of Heritage New Zealand-listed places in Grey District contains those buildings and structures that are listed with Heritage New Zealand (formerly known as Historic Places Trust) in Grey District, New Zealand.

Heritage New Zealand is a Crown entity and the national heritage agency. With a head office in Wellington, the Christchurch area office is responsible for the Grey District.

== Current listings ==
| Image | Article | Description | Location | Street address | Built | Date listed | Heritage category |
|---|---|---|---|---|---|---|---|
| | Railway Beam Bridge | railway bridge in New Zealand | Paroa | Clough Road, Paroa | 1893 | 30 August 1990 | NZHPT Category I listing |
| | Regent Theatre | cinema in Greymouth, New Zealand | Greymouth | 6 Mackay Street, Greymouth 7805 | 1935 | 25 June 2004 | NZHPT Category II listing |
| | Brunner Mine | former coal mine in Greymouth, New Zealand | Taylorville | Taylorville Road, Taylorville, Greymouth | 1864 | 28 June 1990 | NZHPT Category I listing |
| | Royal Hotel | historic hotel building in Greymouth, New Zealand | Greymouth | 128–130 Mawhera Quay, Greymouth 7805 | 1930 | 21 September 1989 | NZHPT Category II listing |
| | Formerly The Blackball Hilton | historic building in Blackball, New Zealand | Blackball | Hart Street, Blackball, New Zealand | 1897; 1908 | 17 December 1993 | NZHPT Category II listing |
| | Greymouth Railway Station Historic Area | historic site in Greymouth, New Zealand | Greymouth | Greymouth | | 21 September 1989 | Historic Area |
| | Greymouth CBD Historic Area | historic area in Greymouth, New Zealand | Greymouth | Tainui/Guinness Street | 1868 | 3 March 1995 | Historic Area |
| | Runanga Miners' Hall | hall in New Zealand | Runanga | Mills Street and McGowan Street, Runanga 7803 | 1937-08-20 | 2 May 2013 | NZHPT Category I listing |
| | Ruru shelter shed | New Zealand shelter shed | Ruru | Midland Line, Ruru 7875 | 1920 | 21 September 1989 | NZHPT Category I listing |
| | Hannah's Buildings | commercial building in New Zealand | Greymouth | 100 Mackay Street and 29 Tainui Street, Greymouth | 1928 | 21 September 1989 | NZHPT Category II listing |
| | Kotuku Model Bungalow | historic building in New Zealand | Kotuku | 1271 Blair Road and Kotuku-Bell Hill Road, Kotuku | 1938 | 14 July 1995 | NZHPT Category I listing |
| | Moana railway station | New Zealand railway station | Moana | Ana Street, Moana | 1904 | 28 June 1990 | NZHPT Category I listing |
| | Government Building (Former) | former government buildings, Greymouth | Greymouth | 130 Mawhera Quay, 163 Mackay Street And Custom Street, Greymouth | 1909 | 28 June 1990 | NZHPT Category I listing |
| | Neptune Backpackers | heritage building and former hotel in New Zealand | Greymouth | 43 Gresson Street, Greymouth | 1905 | 4 April 2008 | NZHPT Category II listing |
| | High Street Auto Centre (Former) | historic commercial building in Greymouth, New Zealand | Greymouth | 76A And 78 High Street, Greymouth | 1935 | 21 September 1989 | NZHPT Category II listing |
| | Heatherbell Hotel | hotel in New Zealand | Totara Flat | 4238 State Highway 7, Totara Flat | 1860 | 19 April 1996 | NZHPT Category II listing |
| | Greymouth Railway Station | historic train station in Greymouth | Greymouth | 156 Mackay Street | 1895 | 28 June 1990 | NZHPT Category I listing |
| | Dispatch & Garlick | former foundry in Greymouth, New Zealand | Greymouth | 36 Lord Street, Greymouth | 1907 | 28 June 1990 | NZHPT Category I listing |
| | Greymouth Courthouse | former courthouse in New Zealand | Greymouth | 8 Guinness Street, Greymouth | 1912 | 28 June 1990 | NZHPT Category I listing |
| | Greymouth Railway Station Footbridge | historic footbridge in Greymouth, New Zealand | Shantytown | 156 Mackay Street (Relocated To Shantytown Heritage Park, 310 Rutherglen Rd, Rutherglen), Greymouth | 1927 | 28 June 1990 | NZHPT Category I listing |
| | Waitaiki House | commercial building in Greymouth, New Zealand | Greymouth | 37-45 Tainui St, Greymouth | 1906 | 21 September 1989 | NZHPT Category II listing |
| | Commercial Building | commercial building in Greymouth, New Zealand | Greymouth | Guinness Street and Albert Street, Greymouth | 1912 | 21 September 1989 | NZHPT Category II listing |
| | St Patricks Presbytery (Former) | clergy house in Greymouth, New Zealand | Greymouth | 16 Chapel Street, Greymouth 7805 | 1914 | 4 April 2008 | NZHPT Category II listing |
| | Makura Croquet Club Pavilion and Greens | Croquet club building | Greymouth | 81 High Street and Buccleugh Street, Greymouth | 1911/1912 | 6th June 2024 | Heritage NZ Category II, ref num: 9255 |
| | Blackball Coal Mine Chimneys | Coal mine chimneys | Blackball | Road Road, Blackball | 1890–1910 | 6th June 1990 | Heritage NZ Category I, ref num: 5005 |

== Previous listings ==
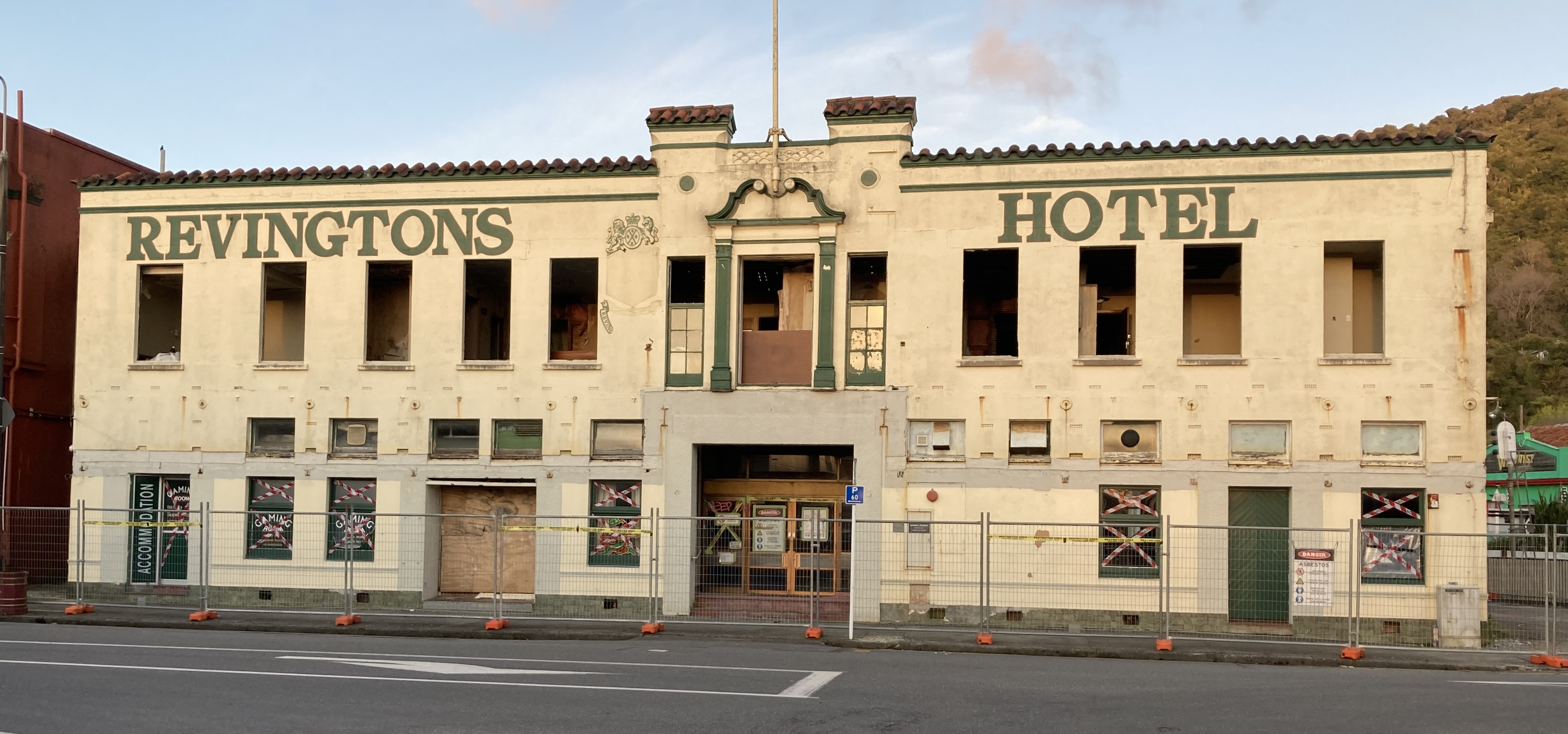
Revingtons Hotel in September 2020

Revingtons Hotel at 45–49 Tainui Street in Greymouth was a Spanish Mission–Art Deco style building constructed in 1938, and listed as a Category II building in 1989. It was delisted in September 2020, after commissioners gave permission for it to be demolished. It was deemed too difficult to repair after significant damage from vandals and squatters.
