= Dunollie =

Dunollie may refer to:

- Dunollie Castle, a castle in Scotland
- Dunollie, New Zealand, a town in the West Coast Region
