= Hannah's building, Greymouth =

Hannah's building
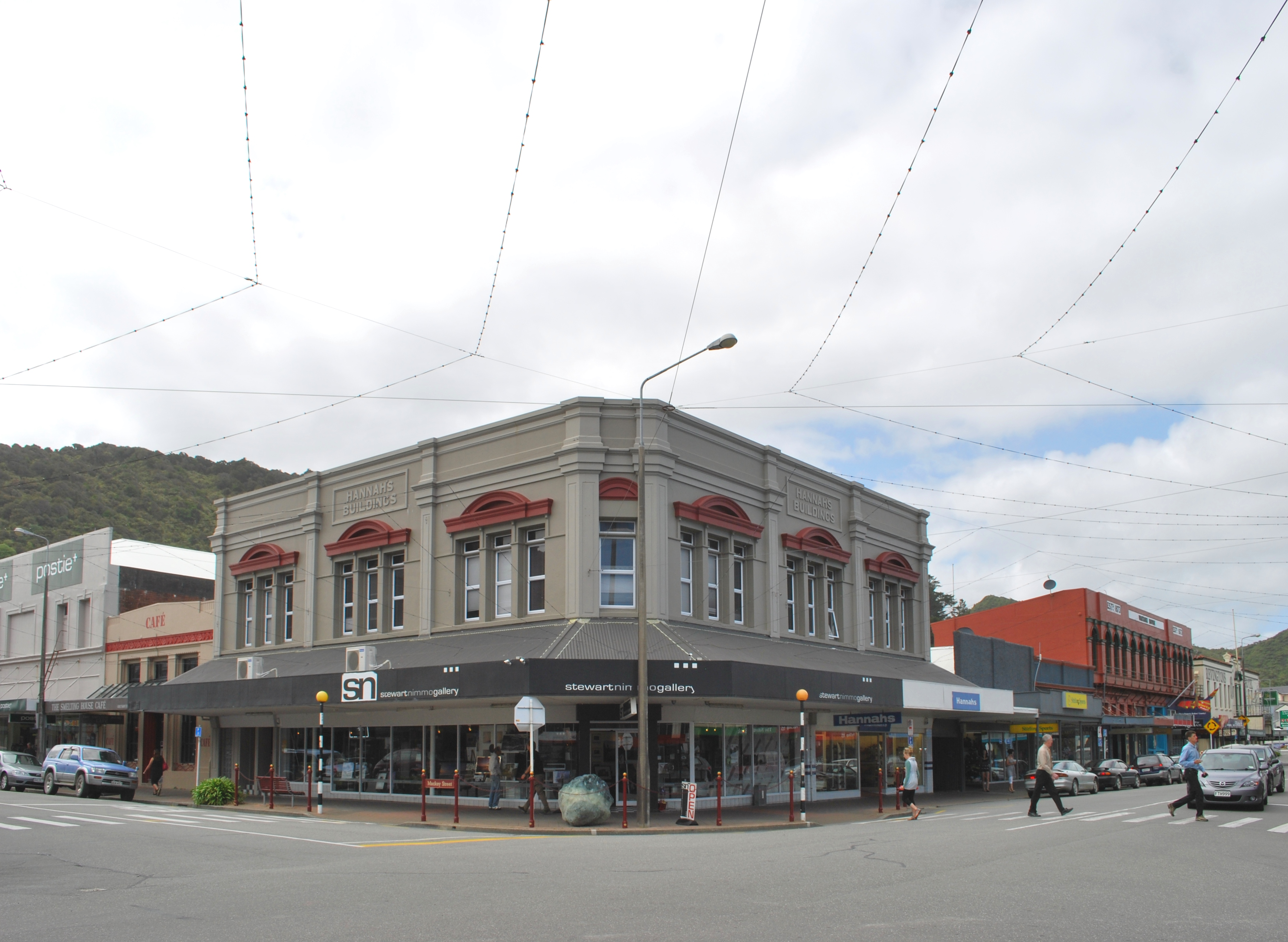
- Hannah's building in 2011

General information
- Type: Commercial
- Architectural style: Pared back neoclassical
- Address: Corner of Mackay and Tainui Streets
- Town or city: Greymouth
- Country: New Zealand
- Coordinates: 42°26′55.8″S 171°12′40.7″E
- Opened: 1928

Technical details
- Material: Plastered brick

Design and construction
- Architect(s): Henry Johns

Heritage New Zealand – Category 2
- Designated: 21 September 1989
- Reference no.: 5062

The Hannah's building is a commercial building in Greymouth, on the West Coast of New Zealand's South Island. Completed in 1928, the building was designed by Wellington architect Henry Johns. In 1989, the Hannah's building was granted historic place category 2 status by Heritage New Zealand.

== Context ==
Irish immigrant Robert Hannah established his bootmaking business in Charleston in 1868, but moved to Wellington as gold production declined, opening his first footwear store on Lambton Quay in 1874. The business grew, and R. Hannah and Company opened their first Greymouth shop on Mawhera Quay in 1887. By 1900, the company had 10 stores across the North Island.

== Architecture ==
In the 1920s, the retail centre of Greymouth was gradually moving from Mawhera Quay to Mackay Street, and in 1926, plans were drawn up by Wellington architect Henry Johns for a new two-storey building for R. Hannah and Company, on the corner of Mackay and Tainui Streets. Johns had previously designed a new four-storey plastered brick factory for Hannah's in Wellington, completed in 1923. The Greymouth building would be one of Johns' later commissions, as he died in 1928.

The new Hannah's building in Greymouth included two shops, and was constructed with plastered double-brick walls, concrete piles, and a corrugated iron roof. Tenders for its construction closed in September 1926, and construction was completed by 1928. The exterior of the building has a pared-back neoclassical style, with three bays of triple-light windows surmounted by curved pediments, each flanked by pilasters, on the two street facades, and cornices framing the top and bottom of the building's parapet.

== Current status ==
In 1989, the Hannah's building received historic place category 2 classification by the New Zealand Historic Places Trust (now Heritage New Zealand). An outlet for the Hannah's footwear chain still occupies part of the ground floor.

== See also ==
- List of historic places in Grey District
