= Kotuku Model Bungalow =

Historic building in New Zealand

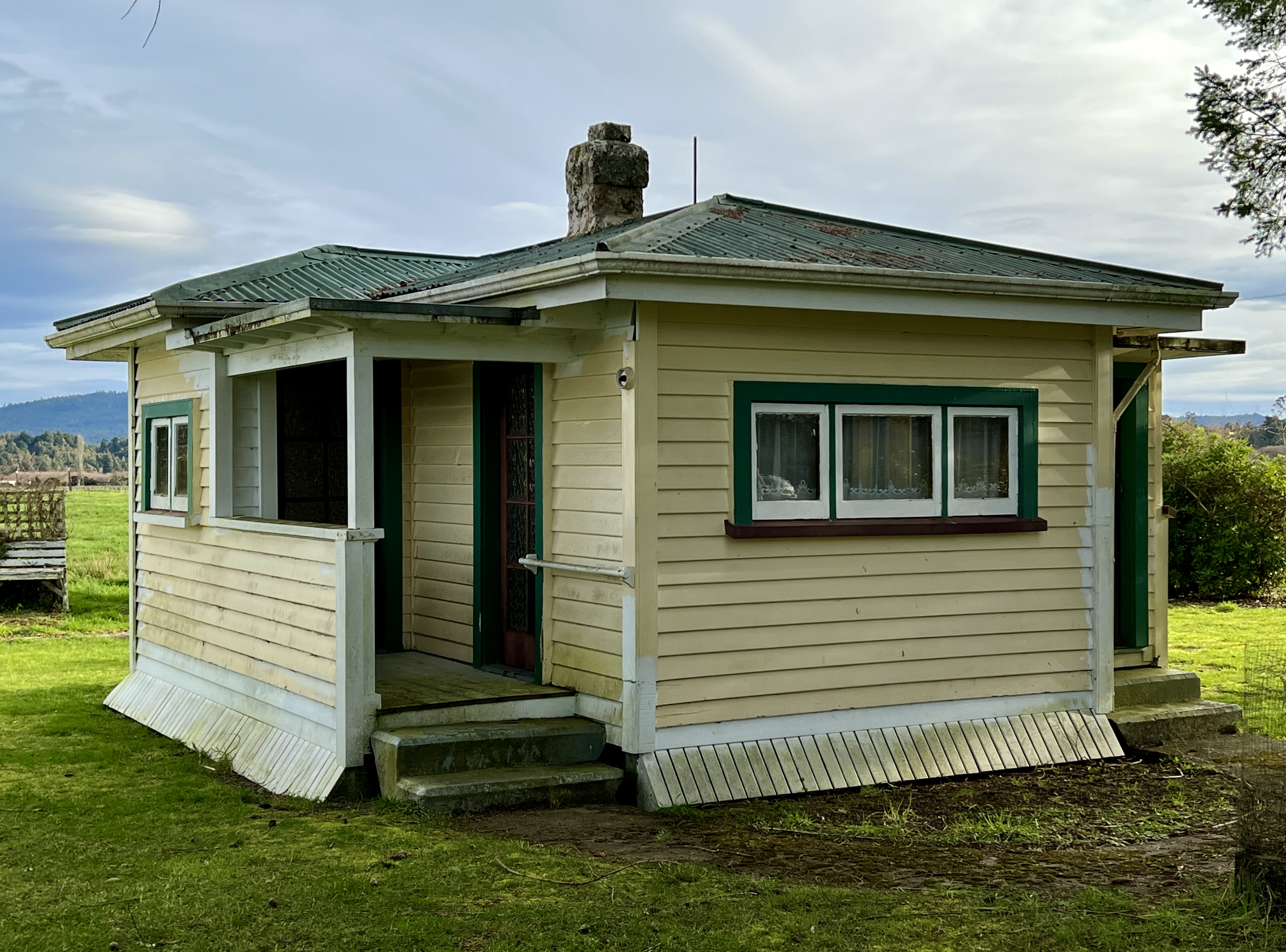
- Kotuku model bungalow exterior in 2022
- Interactive map of the Kotuku Model Bungalow area

General information
- Location: 1271 Blair Road, Kotuku, New Zealand
- Coordinates: 42°32′46″S 171°28′13″E
- Construction started: 1938
- Completed: 1940
- Owner: Department of Conservation

Technical details
- Structural system: Timber
- Floor count: one

Heritage New Zealand – Category 1
- Designated: 14 July 1995
- Reference no.: 7232

The Kotuku Model Bungalow is a historic building in a historic reserve in the Grey District on the West Coast of the South Island of New Zealand.

== Context ==
The 1930s was a time of sweeping changes in the New Zealand education system, and allowed teachers to introduce experiential learning to their classrooms. The headmaster of Jack's Mill School in Kotuku, Edward Darracott, was appointed in 1935. After redesigning the school gardens, the headmaster embarked on a project to have the 10–12 year old pupils design and build a complete, contemporary, model house of the 1930s. It is possibly the only such example.

== Design ==
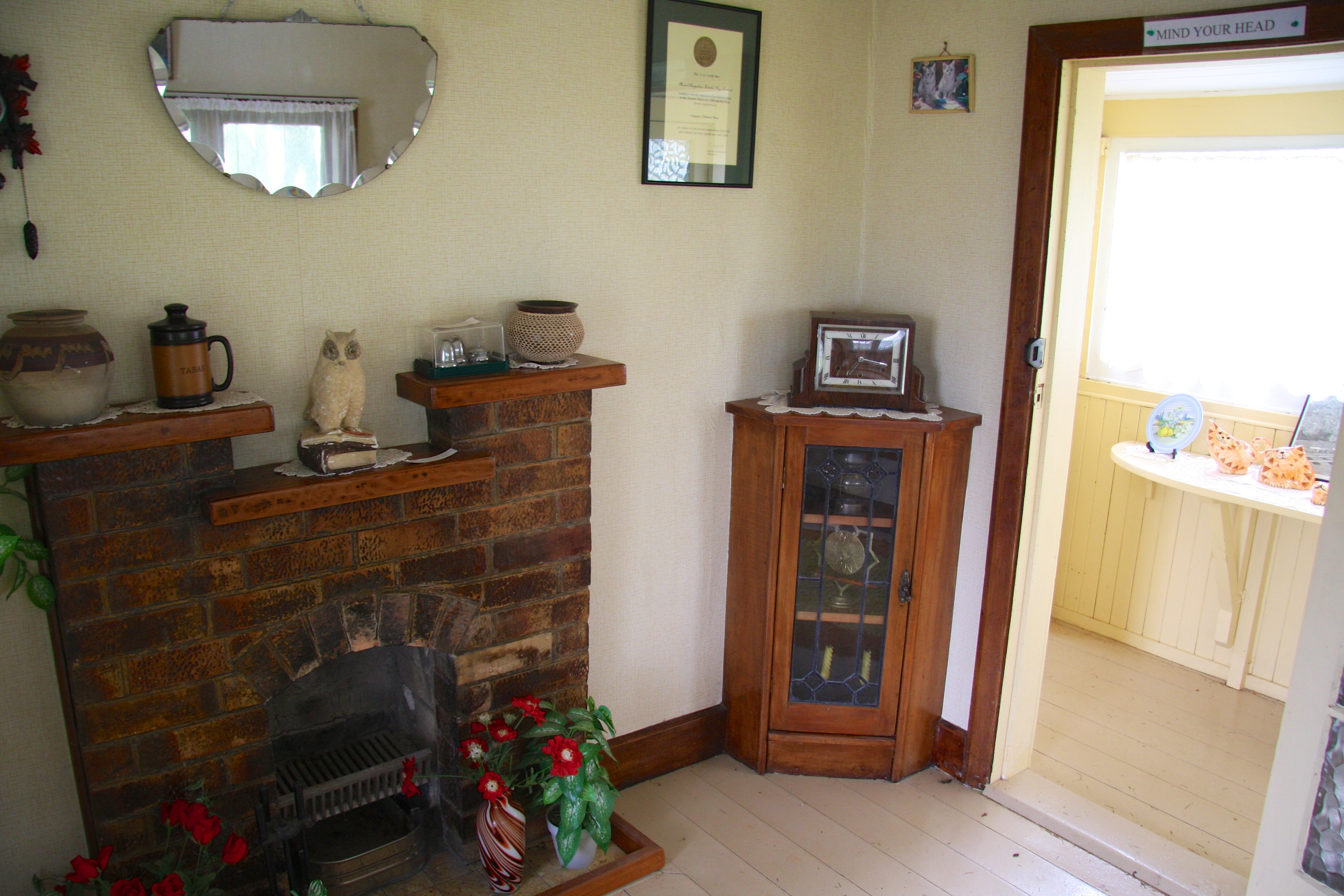
Interior of the bungalow showing fireplace

The bungalow was designed by 12 year old Rosemary O'Brien, a pupil at Jack's Mill school. It is of the English cottage style with Modernist elements. It shares many features with State House designs of the time, such as standard joinery and a more open plan floor plan, although there is no known connection. As part of the project pupils designed a Modernist abstract carpet design described as of "surprisingly high quality".

== Construction ==
The bungalow was constructed between 1938 and 1940, at 3/4 scale. The pupils sourced three quarter size interior appliances including a custom-made bath tub, a hot water cylinder, stove, kitchen sink and kitchen units. The house had running water and electricity, and functioned as the home economics classroom until the school was closed in 1955.

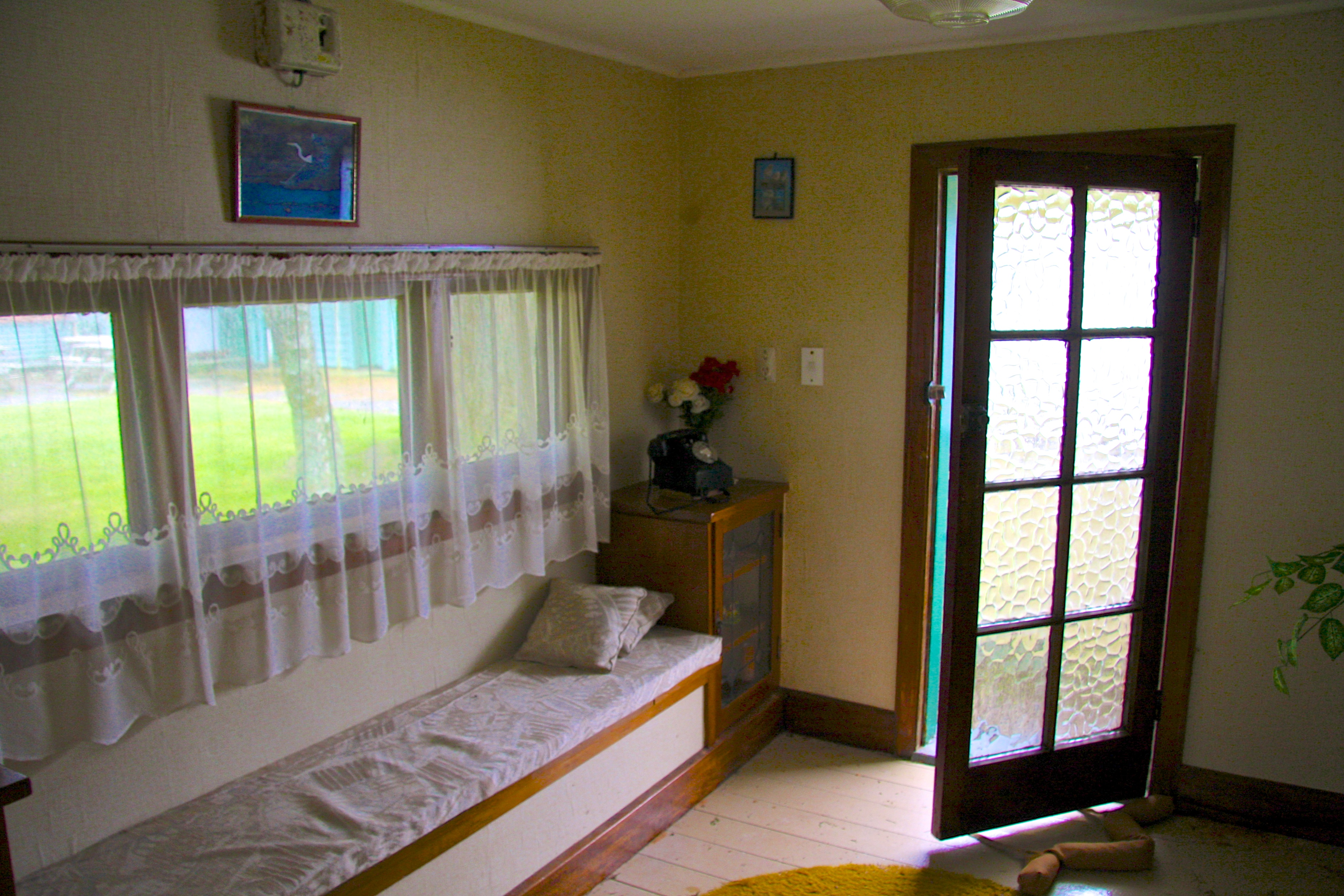
Interior of the bungalow

== Later history ==
In 1968 the school and grounds were transferred to the ownership of the Department of Education. The Christchurch Teachers' Training College used the site for accommodation while on field trips, but relinquished ownership to the Ministry of Education in 1994. The school was purchased by the Department of Conservation in 2004, and gazetted that year as a Historic Reserve to be managed by the Kotuku Heritage Society. The bungalow, which had been allowed to fall into disrepair, was restored. Most of the volunteers involved in the repair and restoration were former pupils of the school.

The Model Bungalow is registered by the New Zealand Historic Places Trust as a Category I structure, with registration number 7232. The other buildings onsite contain displays describing the history of the school and bungalow.

== See also ==
- List of historic places in Grey District
