= Runanga Miners' Hall =

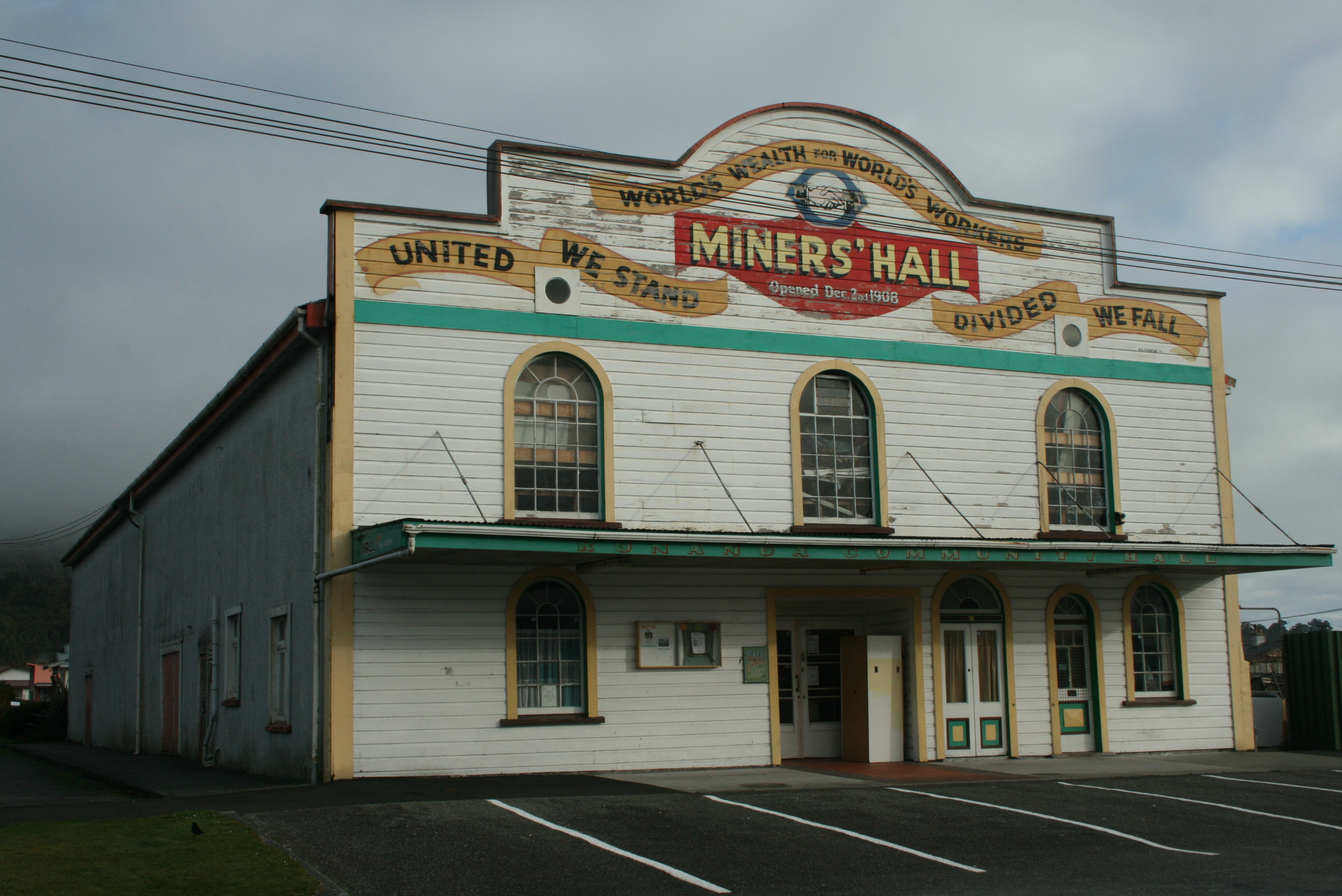
- Runanga Miners' Hall in 2009

General information
- Type: Community hall
- Architectural style: Frontier style
- Address: 7 McGowan Street
- Town or city: Runanga
- Country: New Zealand
- Coordinates: 42°24′1.7″S 171°15′3.8″E
- Opened: 20 August 1937

Technical details
- Material: Timber, glass, corrugated steel

Design and construction
- Architect(s): George Millar
- Main contractor: Jack McMillan

Heritage New Zealand – Category 1
- Designated: 2 May 2013
- Reference no.: 9613

The Runanga Miners' Hall is a hall in the town of Runanga, on the West Coast of New Zealand's South Island. The current structure dates from 1937, and replaced an early miners' hall from 1908 that was destroyed by fire. The hall is notable for its place in the history of the organised labour movement in New Zealand, and was granted historic place category 1 status by Heritage New Zealand in 2013.

== History ==
The union movement was building at the beginning of the twentieth century and the Runanga coal mine was a focus for the movement and for socialists who were proponents of a nationalised coal industry.

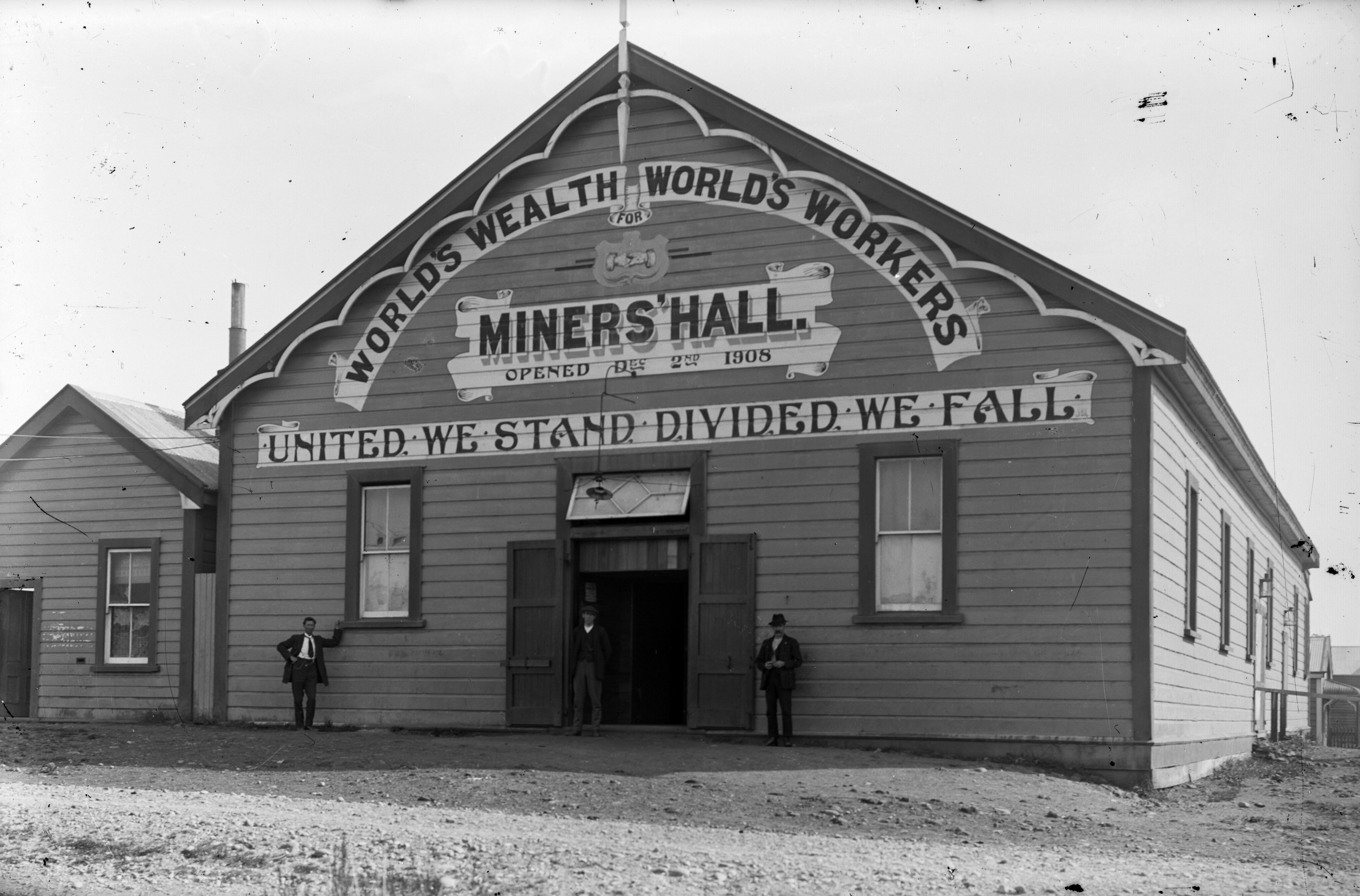
Miners' Hall, c. 1910

Plans for the hall were begun in 1905 and the unionist and politician Bob Semple was instrumental in planning and getting the hall built. It was built on the corner of Mills and McGowan Streets and was opened on 4 December 1908 by Semple. A train brought people from Greymouth to Runanga for the opening. It was the country's first co-operatively built building with input from the State Miners' Union, the mines, Greymouth business people and the state. The building was designed by the mines engineer George Millar and built by Walter Murray of Cobden.

In January 1937 fire destroyed the hall and adjacent union office. It was suspected to be politically motivated arson but no one was ever charged. Nine months later the building was replaced with another design by George Millar, and built by J. McMillan of Cobden.

A memorial service for the first Labour prime minister Michael Joseph Savage was held in the hall in 1940.

The State Miners' Union relinquished ownership of the building when it folded in the 1960s. The building was then used as a wooden-goods factory. It became the Runanga District Community Centre in 1980 and restorations were performed in 1983 and 2000. In 2012 the hall closed due to earthquake concerns. A project to strengthen and renovate the building was begun in 2020.

Throughout its life the hall was also a community hub and venue for social events, such as union and political meetings, concerts, shows and dances. It was also used as a movie theatre as well as a town hall.

== Design ==
The 1908 building had a pitched roof and central door between two windows. The later building had round-headed windows and a stepped parapet and curved gable. It was described as "frontier style" with neo-Georgian and Italianate features which were not common in buildings of the 1930s.

Several slogans were painted on the inside and outside of the building. On the inside were "World's wealth for the world's workers", "Not for a race, but for all mankind" and "The world is our country, to do good is our religion". On the outside "United we stand, divided we fall" was painted on the building in 1908 by a signwriter James Begg Kent. Kent later became a Labour Party Member of Parliament. The sign was repainted on the new building in 1937 but later covered over while it was used as a factory. It was uncovered in the 2000 renovation.

== Current status ==
Since 2013 the hall has been registered by Heritage New Zealand as a Category I structure, with registration number 9613. Its status reflects its place in the history of organised labour in New Zealand and the Labour Party. It is also one of the very few existing examples of a miners' hall. In 2014 the hall was almost demolished after the roof was destroyed by a cyclone but restoration has been underway since then. It has been proposed that the hall be made a UNESCO World Heritage site.

== See also ==
- List of historic places in Grey District
