= Tyneside Mine =

Coal mine in New Zealand

Coordinates: 42°26′4″S 171°19′26″E

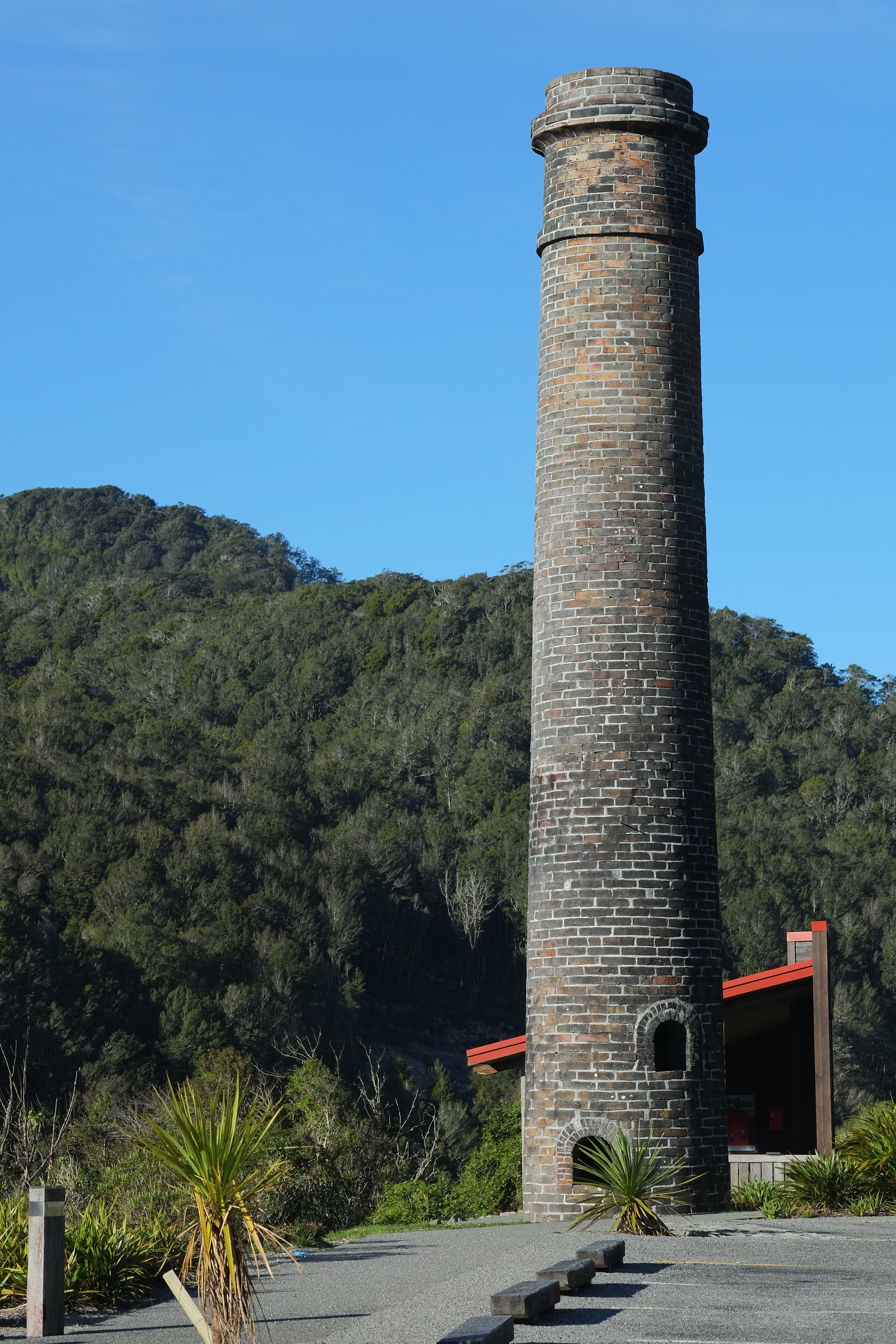
Tyneside mine chimney

The Tyneside Mine was a coal mine on the West Coast of the South Island in New Zealand. The Tyneside Mine was one of several mines situated on the banks of the Grey River, at an area known as "Coal Gorge" between the townships of Stillwater and Taylorville. The Tyneside Mine operated from the 1870s until 1908.

The Brunner suspension bridge, originally built in 1876, connects the site of the Tyneside Mine on the southern bank of the Grey River with the Brunner Mine on the northern bank. The area is now a historic attraction and memorial, accessible from a car park adjacent to the Tyneside Mine chimney, next to State Highway 7.

== See also ==
- Mining in New Zealand
