= Brunner Mine =

Coal mine near Greymouth, New Zealand

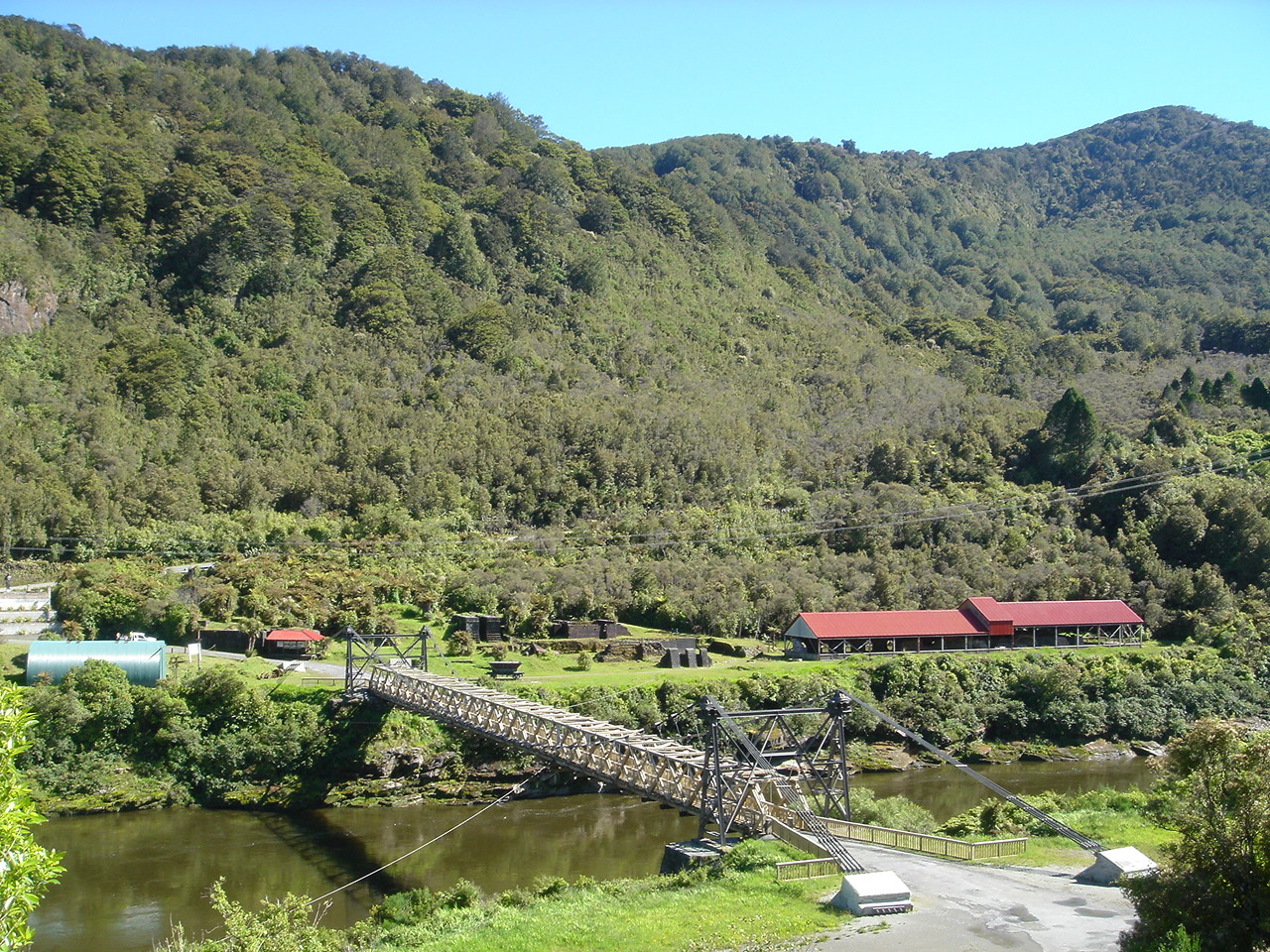
- The Brunner Mine site in 2004
- Interactive map of Brunner Mine

Location
- Location: 11 km (6.8 mi) northeast of Greymouth, New Zealand; 42°25′57″S 171°19′27″E

Production
- Products: Coal

History
- Opened: 1864
- Closed: 1942

The Brunner Mine was a coal mine on the West Coast of the South Island in New Zealand.

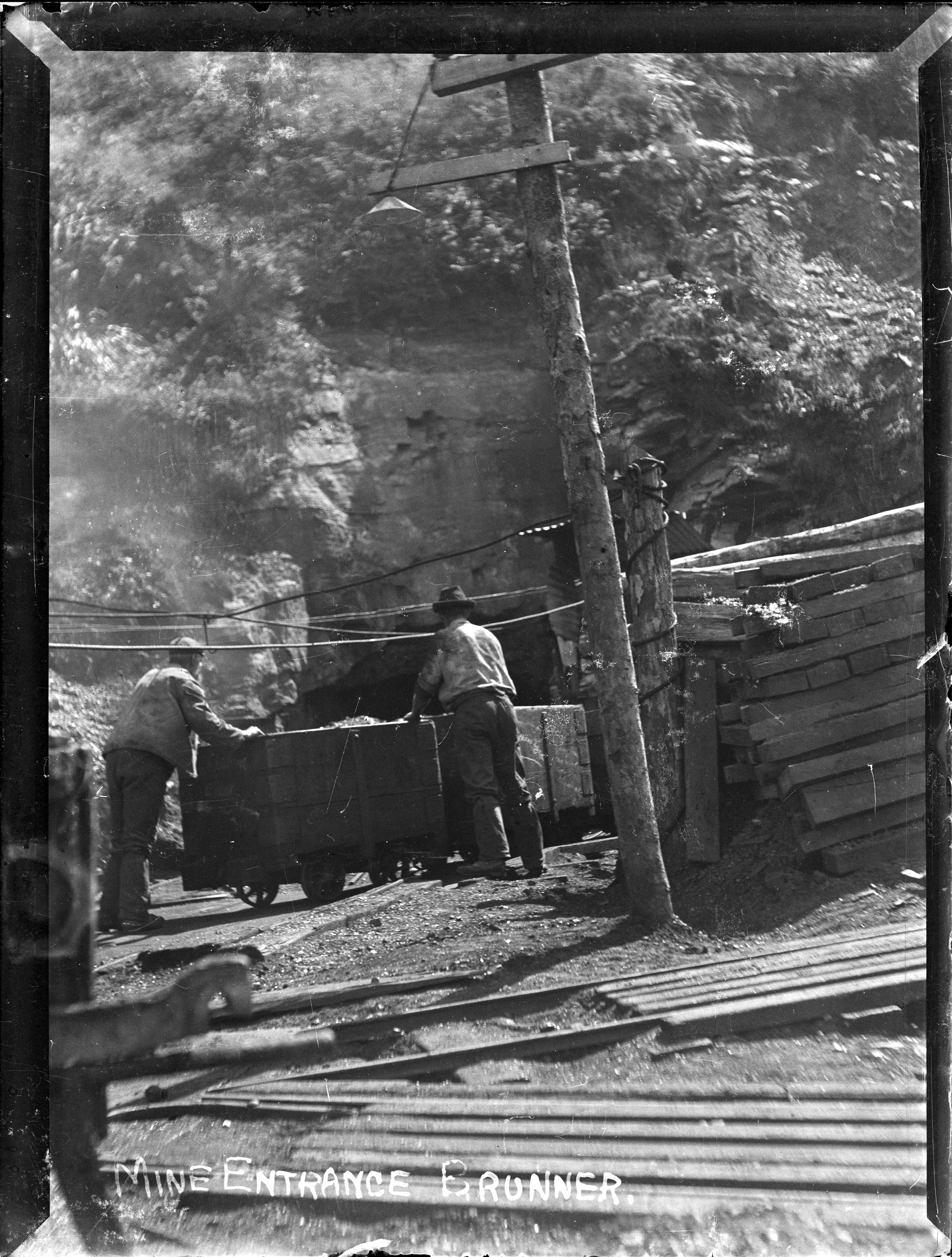
Mine entrance at the Brunner Mine, c. 1900

The Brunner Mine was one of several mines situated on the banks of the Grey River, at an area known as "Coal Gorge" between the townships of Stillwater and Taylorville. The town of Brunner (formerly Brunnerton) is nearby.

Coal was discovered on the West Coast by Nelson surveyor Thomas Brunner "during the most arduous of his journeys in search of more agricultural land". The coal was of extremely high quality and it did not take long before it attracted interest. And, of course, "The West Coast had the added attraction of gold mining and it seems that the employment opportunity offered by coal mining was in the difficult economic times not one to be turned down".

== Brunner Mine disaster ==
In March 1896, an explosion deep in the mine killed all 65 miners inside, and was labelled the worst mining disaster in New Zealand's history. It seemed most likely that the explosion was caused by firedamp, a common hazard in coal mines, where a pocket of methane gas is accidentally ignited and explodes.

== Current site ==
Today, all that visibly remains of the mine and its related industry are the remains of the old coke ovens on the north side of the river, as well as the memorial at that location listing the names of the miners killed. The graves in Stillwater cemetery include one mass grave containing the bodies of 33 of the miners killed.

The entrance to the mine has long been engulfed by the bush, as have any trace of the bustling industry that once existed on that spot.

A loop walk with interpretive panels leads from the car park next to State Highway 7 down the valley and over the refurbished Brunner Bridge to the remnants of the Brunner Mine site and a memorial statue. A meticulously restored Q class railway coal wagon is on display near the bridge.

The chimney on the south bank between the road and railway line has often been associated with the Brunner Mine, but was actually part of the Tyneside Mine on the south side of the river.

== See also ==
- List of historic places in Grey District
- Mining in New Zealand
- Pike River Mine
