= Runanga, New Zealand =

Town in the South Island of New Zealand

Runanga
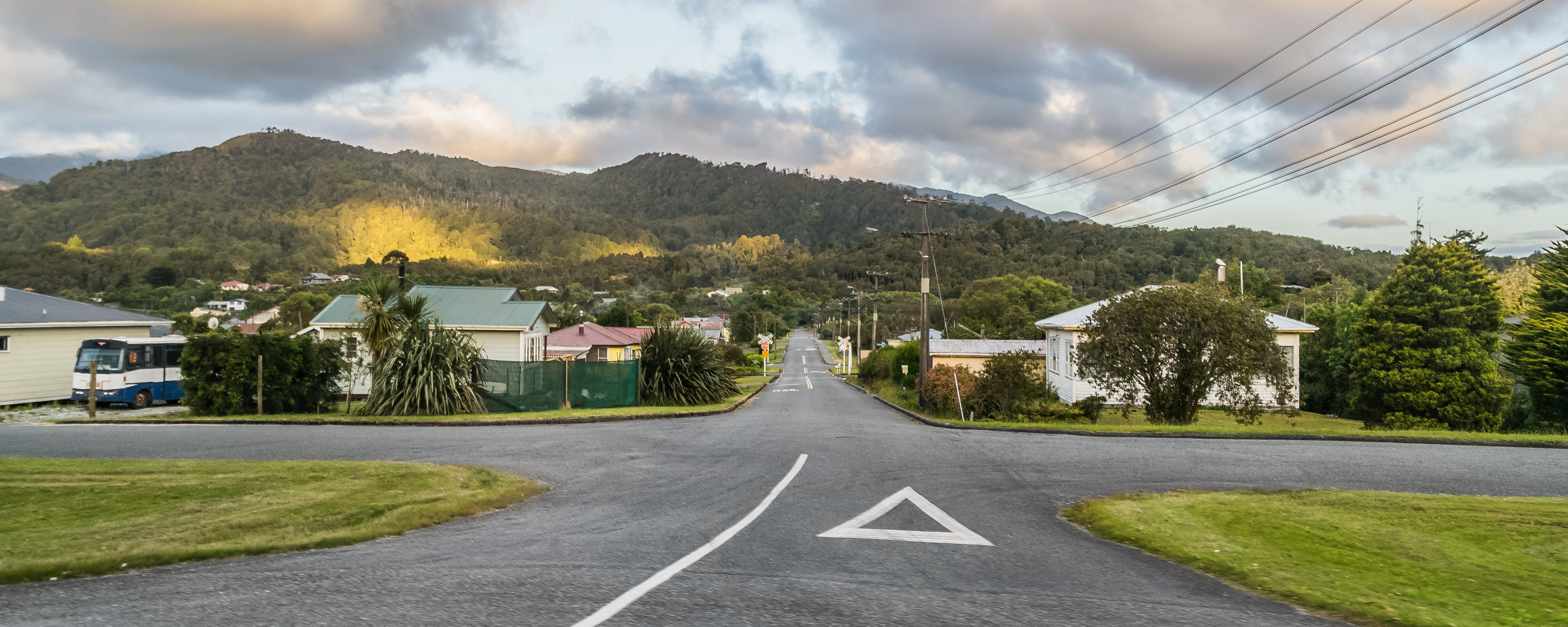
- Carroll Street
- Interactive map of Runanga
- Coordinates: 42°24′2″S 171°15′5″E
- Country: New Zealand
- Region: West Coast
- District: Grey District
- Ward: Northern
- Electorates: West Coast-Tasman; Te Tai Tonga

Government
  - Territorial authority: Grey District Council
  - Regional council: West Coast Regional Council
  - Mayor of Grey: Tania Gibson
  - West Coast-Tasman MP: Maureen Pugh
  - Te Tai Tonga MP: Tākuta Ferris

Area
  - Total: 4.51 km^{2} (1.74 sq mi)

Population (June 2025)
  - Total: 1,200
  - Density: 270/km^{2} (690/sq mi)
- Local iwi: Ngāi Tahu

Runanga is a small town on the West Coast of the South Island of New Zealand. It is located eight kilometres northeast of Greymouth, north of the Grey River. Barrytown is 21 kilometres (13 mi) further north. State Highway 6 and the Rapahoe Branch railway run through the town. Runanga was formerly a railway junction, with the steep Rewanui Branch diverging from the Rapahoe line until its closure in 1985.

The town's origins can be traced back to European colonisation in the late 19th century, when large numbers of settlers came to work the local coal fields. The town's name is Māori for "meeting place". Coal mining is still the main employer of the town.

== History ==
During the period 1853 to 1876, the area which became the township of Runanga was administrated as part of the Nelson Province.

Unlike many towns and settlements on the West Coast which grew up around gold mining, Runanga was established as a centre to support the local coal mining industry. In 1902 the Seddon Government established its own coal mines, proclaiming the whole area on the north side of the Grey River as a State Coal Reserve. The Point Elizabeth No. 1 mine began producing coal from 17 March 1904. In 1903 a sawmill opened and timber houses began to replace the tents which had formed housing until then. The Borough of Runanga came into effect in 1912 with an area of 1,210 acres and a population of about 1,500.

== Demographics ==
Rūnanga is described by Stats NZ as a small urban area, which includes Dunollie and Rapahoe. It covers 4.51 km^{2} (1.74 sq mi) and had an estimated population of 1,200 as of June 2025, with a population density of 266 people per km^{2}.

Historical population
Year	Pop.	±% p.a.
2006	1,233	—
2013	1,248	+0.17%
2018	1,185	−1.03%
2023	1,179	−0.10%

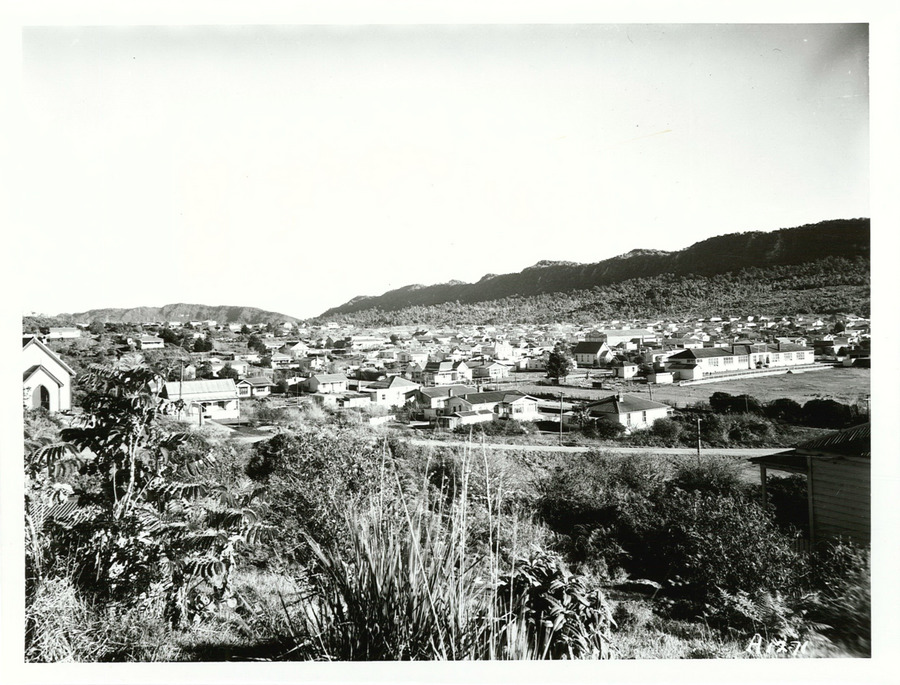
Coal mining in Runanga in the early 20th century

Rūnanga had a population of 1,179 in the 2023 New Zealand census, a decrease of 6 people (−0.5%) since the 2018 census, and a decrease of 69 people (−5.5%) since the 2013 census. There were 606 males, 573 females, and 3 people of other genders in 516 dwellings. 3.6% of people identified as LGBTIQ+. The median age was 49.9 years (compared with 38.1 years nationally). There were 168 people (14.2%) aged under 15 years, 150 (12.7%) aged 15 to 29, 567 (48.1%) aged 30 to 64, and 291 (24.7%) aged 65 or older.

People could identify as more than one ethnicity. The results were 91.9% European (Pākehā); 12.2% Māori; 0.8% Pasifika; 2.3% Asian; 0.3% Middle Eastern, Latin American and African New Zealanders (MELAA); and 5.9% other, which includes people giving their ethnicity as "New Zealander". English was spoken by 98.7%, Māori by 1.0%, and other languages by 2.5%. No language could be spoken by 1.0% (e.g. too young to talk). New Zealand Sign Language was known by 1.0%. The percentage of people born overseas was 9.4, compared with 28.8% nationally.

Religious affiliations were 20.9% Christian, 0.3% Buddhist, 0.8% New Age, and 1.0% other religions. People who answered that they had no religion were 64.6%, and 12.2% of people did not answer the census question.

Of those at least 15 years old, 66 (6.5%) people had a bachelor's or higher degree, 588 (58.2%) had a post-high school certificate or diploma, and 363 (35.9%) people exclusively held high school qualifications. The median income was $28,300, compared with $41,500 nationally. 45 people (4.5%) earned over $100,000 compared to 12.1% nationally. The employment status of those at least 15 was 390 (38.6%) full-time, 138 (13.6%) part-time, and 36 (3.6%) unemployed.

== Community ==
As with most other towns, Runanga had its fair share of clubs and societies. One such organisation that no longer exists in Runanga, and which few may remember, is the Runanga Lodge No 74 of the Royal Antedilluvian Order of Buffaloe's. This Lodge was opened on May 13, 1939, by the Provincial Grand Primo Bro. James Insull K.O.M. The founders of the lodge were Bro. C Ingram C.P. and Bro. T Durkin C.P.

The Foundation members were R McMillan, H Fisher, J Musgrove, J O'Connel, W.T. Foster, F Crange, R McTaggart, Owen O'Connell, G.W. Timlin, A.W. Fisher, W Amor, J Stephens, D Butler, S H Werner, J O'Neil and R Scott.

In April 1943, The Lodge held their first meeting in their own Hall. They had been meeting in rented accommodation up until then.

== Miners' Hall ==
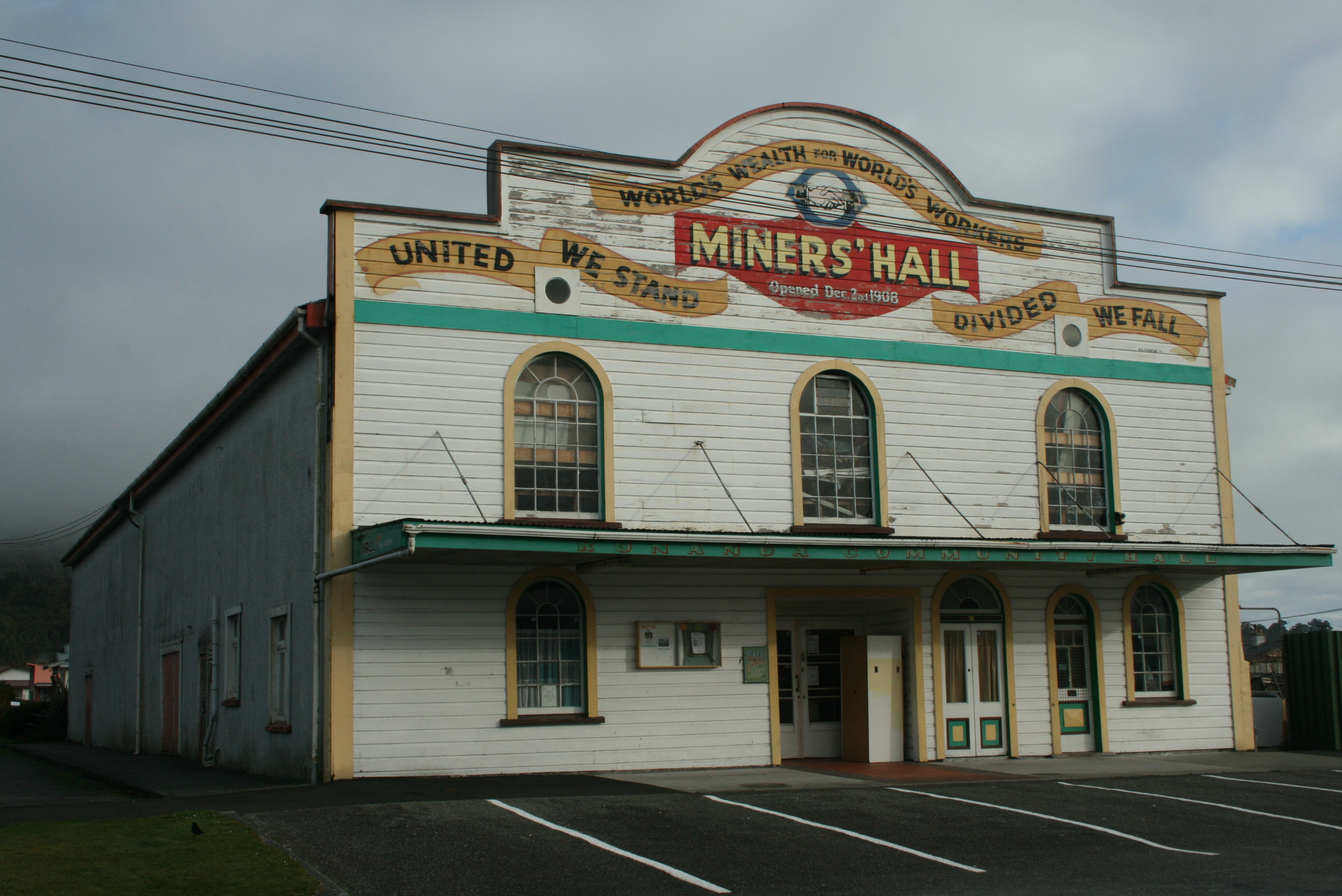
The Miners' Hall in 2009

The Runanga Miners' Hall is registered by Heritage New Zealand as a Category I structure, with registration number 9613. It is significant because of its place in the history of the union movement in New Zealand and because it is one of the few remaining examples of a miners' hall. A $1.1 million project to strengthen the Miner's Hall was announced in 2020.

== Coal Creek Waterfall ==
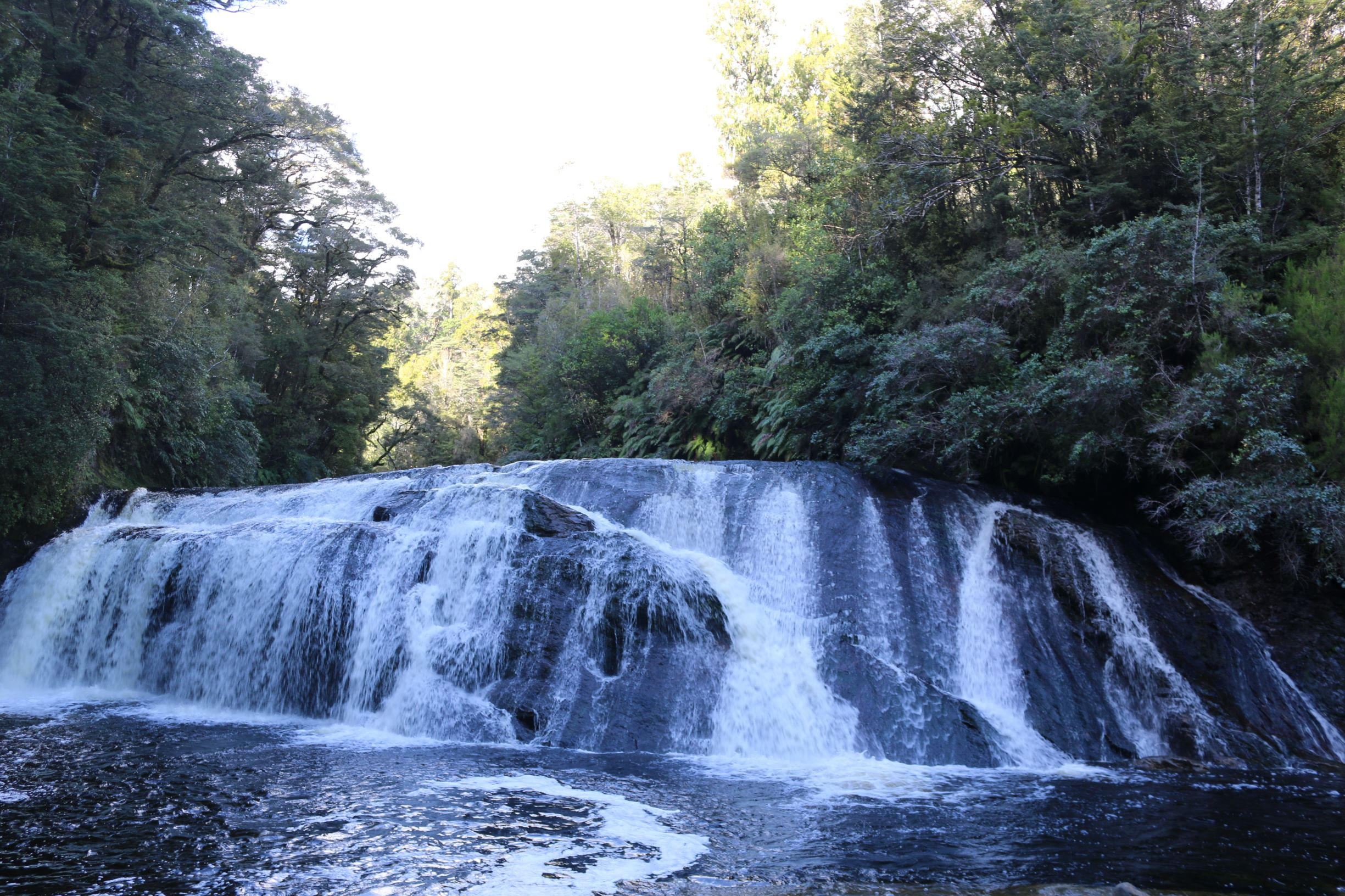
Coal Creek Waterfall (2021)

The Coal Creek waterfall is accessed via the Coal Creek walking track which starts in Runanga. The track is a gentle 3.6 kilometres return and travels along Coal Creek through beech trees and other podocarps. The waterfalls are the width of the river and seven metres high.

== Notable people ==
- Moses Ayrton, New Zealand politician
- Paul Caffyn, sea kayaker
- George Duggan (1912–2012) was a New Zealand Marist priest, philosopher, seminary professor and writer (he was popularly known as Chalky Duggan – after a featherweight boxer who fought in 1919, when Duggan was 7 years old, under the name "Chalky Duggan" and who, like Duggan, came from Runanga.
- Dave McKenzie (born 1943 in Dunollie, Grey District) is a former long-distance runner. He represented New Zealand in the men's marathon at two consecutive Summer Olympics, starting in Mexico City (1968). He won the Boston Marathon in 1967.
- George Menzies, who in 2008 was named the greatest rugby league five-eighth New Zealand had ever produced spent his playing career at Runanga's club.
- James O'Brien, Labour MP for Westland 1922–25 and 1928–1947 and Minister of Transport and Marine during the First Labour Government, lived and worked in Runanga from 1906 for about ten years.
- Frank O'Flynn, Minister of Defence in the Fourth Labour Government, was born in Runanga in 1918.
- Bob Semple, Minister of Public Works in the First Labour Government, was President of the Runanga Miner's Union in 1907.
- Paddy Webb, Minister of Mines in the First Labour Government, worked in the Runanga mine about 1906.

== Education ==
Runanga School is a coeducational full primary school (years 1–8), with a roll of 20 students as of July 2026. It opened in 1906.

St Joseph's School was a Sisters of Mercy Catholic School in Runanga, which opened in 1913 and closed in 1972.
