= Dunollie, New Zealand =

Dunollie
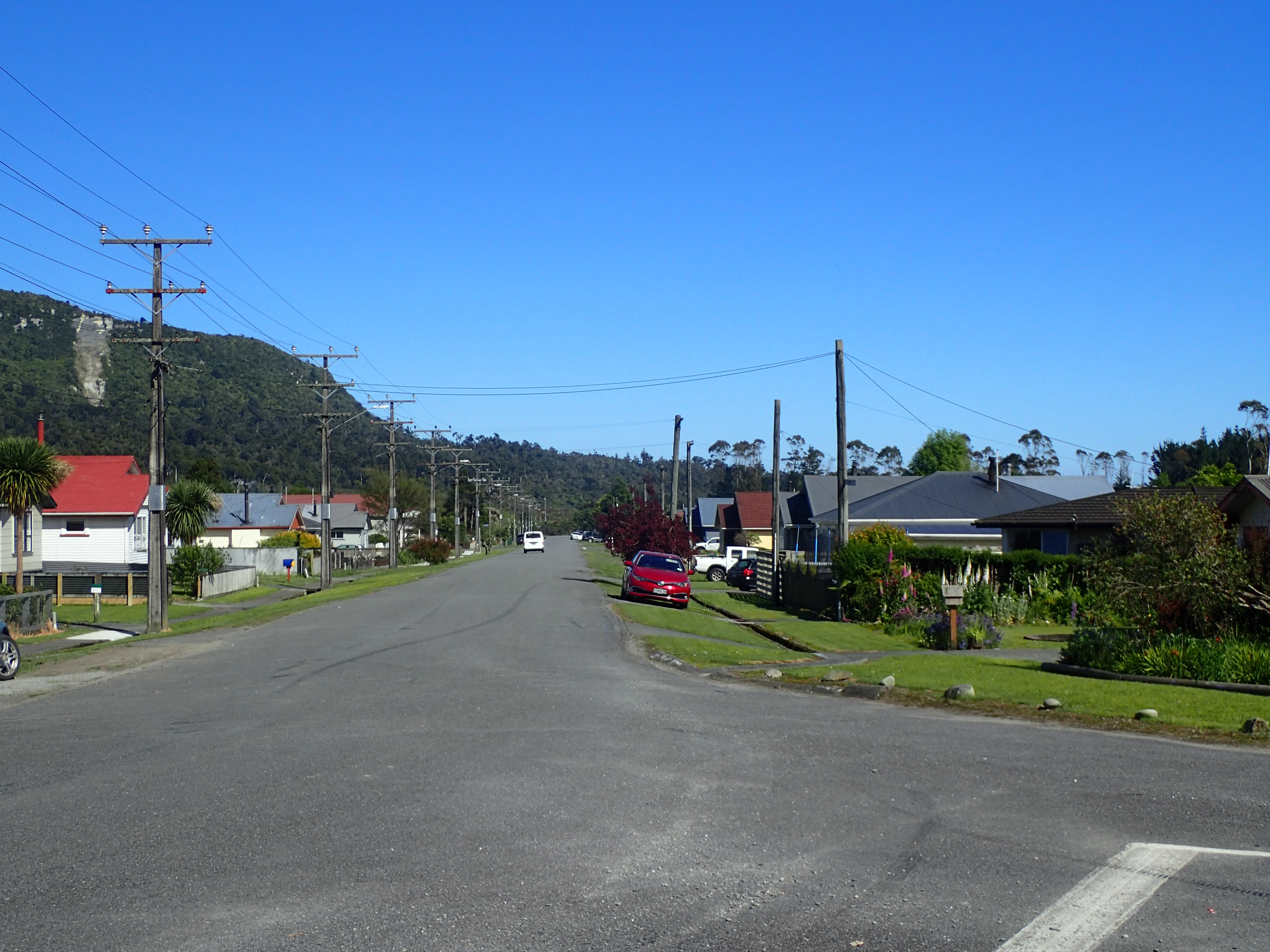
- Dunollie Main Street
- Interactive map of Dunollie
- Coordinates: 42°23′17″S 171°15′36″E
- Country: New Zealand
- Region: West Coast
- District: Grey District

Area
  - Total: 961 km^{2} (371 sq mi)

Population (2023 census)
  - Total: 246
  - Density: 0.256/km^{2} (0.663/sq mi)
- Local iwi: Ngāi Tahu

Dunollie is a small town on the West Coast of the South Island of New Zealand, approximately 8 km from Greymouth. It is at an elevation of approximately 30 meters.

Dunollie was a station on the Rewanui line railway. Coal deposits were discovered in the Paparoa Ranges.

== Demographics ==
Dunollie covers 0.61 km^{2} (0.24 sq mi). It is part of the Runanga urban area.

Historical population
Year	Pop.	±% p.a.
2006	279	—
2013	282	+0.15%
2018	261	−1.54%
2023	246	−1.18%

Dunollie had a population of 246 in the 2023 New Zealand census, a decrease of 15 people (−5.7%) since the 2018 census, and a decrease of 36 people (−12.8%) since the 2013 census. There were 138 males and 111 females in 114 dwellings. 2.4% of people identified as LGBTIQ+. There were 33 people (13.4%) aged under 15 years, 33 (13.4%) aged 15 to 29, 120 (48.8%) aged 30 to 64, and 63 (25.6%) aged 65 or older.

People could identify as more than one ethnicity. The results were 95.1% European (Pākehā), 12.2% Māori, 1.2% Pasifika, 2.4% Asian, and 2.4% other, which includes people giving their ethnicity as "New Zealander". English was spoken by 100.0%, and other languages by 4.9%. The percentage of people born overseas was 9.8, compared with 28.8% nationally.

Religious affiliations were 23.2% Christian, 1.2% Buddhist, and 1.2% New Age. People who answered that they had no religion were 61.0%, and 13.4% of people did not answer the census question.

Of those at least 15 years old, 9 (4.2%) people had a bachelor's or higher degree, 126 (59.2%) had a post-high school certificate or diploma, and 78 (36.6%) people exclusively held high school qualifications. 9 people (4.2%) earned over $100,000 compared to 12.1% nationally. The employment status of those at least 15 was 84 (39.4%) full-time, 33 (15.5%) part-time, and 9 (4.2%) unemployed.

== Cretaceous–Paleogene (K–Pg) extinction event ==
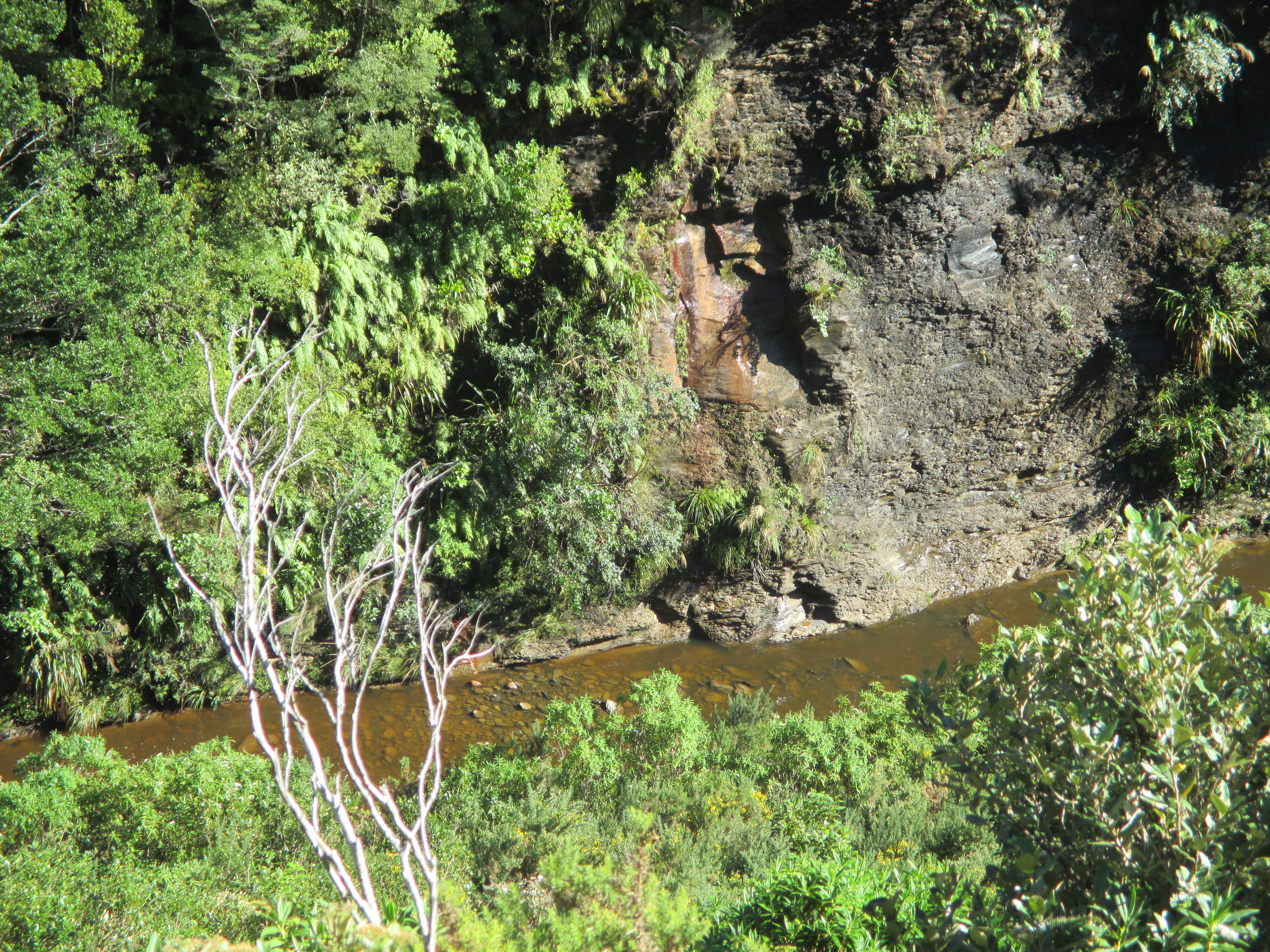
The river bed at the Moody Creek Mine, 7 Mile Creek / Waimatuku, Dunollie contains evidence of a devastating event on terrestrial plant communities at the Cretaceous–Paleogene boundary, confirming the severity and global nature of the event.

The Cretaceous–Paleogene (K–Pg) extinction event, also known as the Cretaceous–Tertiary (K–T) extinction, was a sudden mass extinction of three-quarters of the plant and animal species on Earth approximately 66 million years ago.

Some 2 kilometers up the valley near the river bed and near the Moody Creek mine, a layer of rock was found where the formation of coal had abruptly ended some 66 million years ago. The top of the coal was coated with a thin layer of Iriduim and then there occurred a 40,000 year Fern Spike. This formation was key in proving the size, severity and the global nature of the Chixulub Impactor. The K–Pg extinction event was severe, global, rapid, and selective, eliminating a vast number of species. Based on marine fossils, it is estimated that 75% or more of all species were made extinct.
