= Environment of New Zealand =

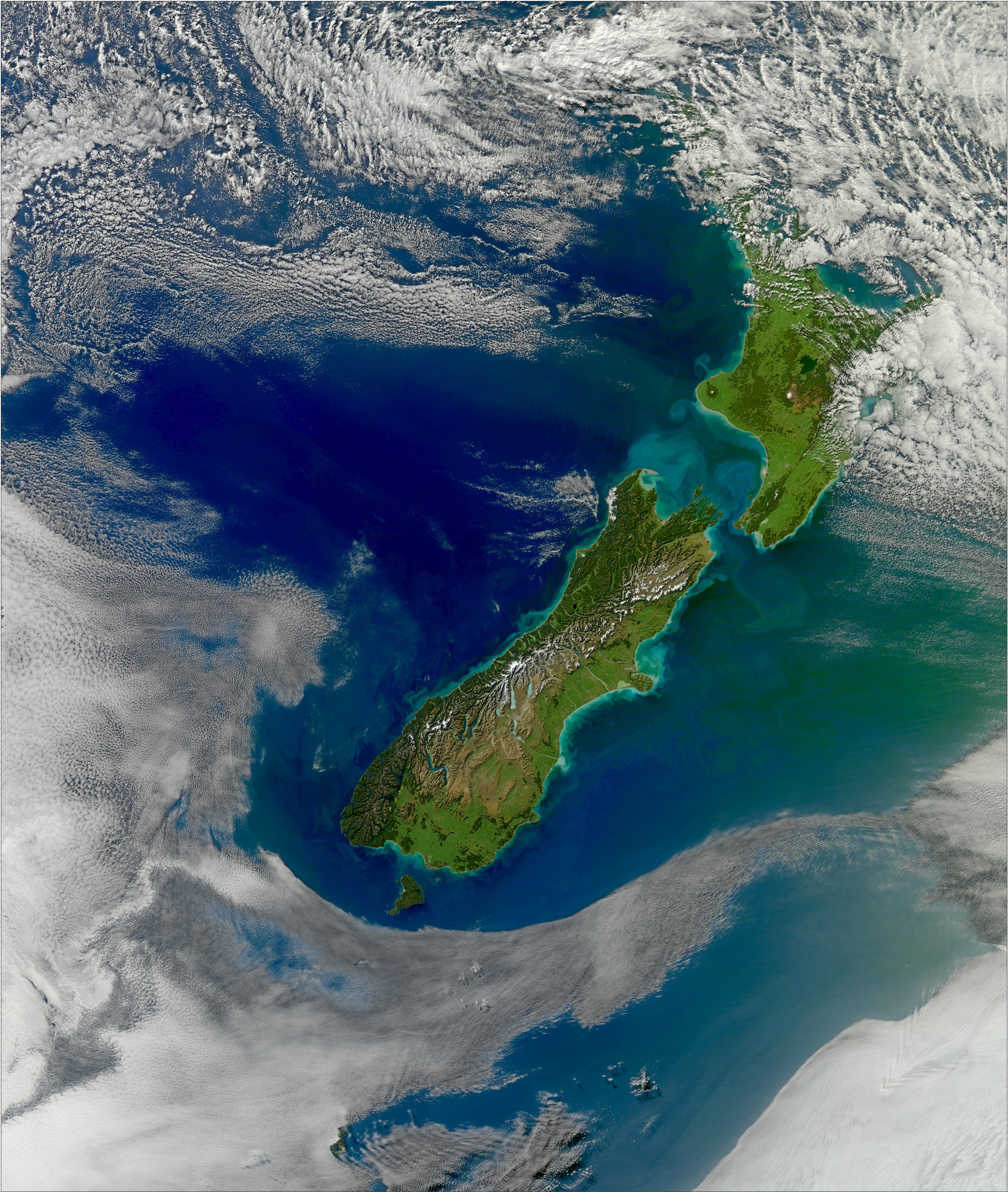
New Zealand, showing mountains dividing a wet largely forested west coast from a drier east coast

The environment of New Zealand is characterised by an endemic flora and fauna which has evolved in near isolation from the rest of the world. The main islands of New Zealand span two biomes, temperate and subtropical, complicated by large mountainous areas above the tree line. There are also numerous smaller islands which extend into the subantarctic. The prevailing weather systems bring significantly more rain to the west of the country. New Zealand's territorial waters cover a much larger area than its landmass and extend over the continental shelf and abyssal plateau in the South Pacific Ocean, Tasman Sea and Southern ocean.

Historically having an isolated and endemic ecosystem far into modernity, the arrival of Polynesians about 1300 AD and then later European settlers began to have significant impacts on this system, with the intentional and unintentional introduction of new species and plants which often overwhelmed their natural competitors, leading to a significant loss of native ecology and biodiversity, especially in areas such as bird life.

Today, most parts of New Zealand are heavily modified by the effects of logging, agriculture and general human settlement, though large areas have also been placed under protection, combined in many cases with efforts to protect or regenerate native ecosystems (aided by the fact that especially the South Island of New Zealand has a very low population density).

== Physical environment ==
=== Natural disturbances ===
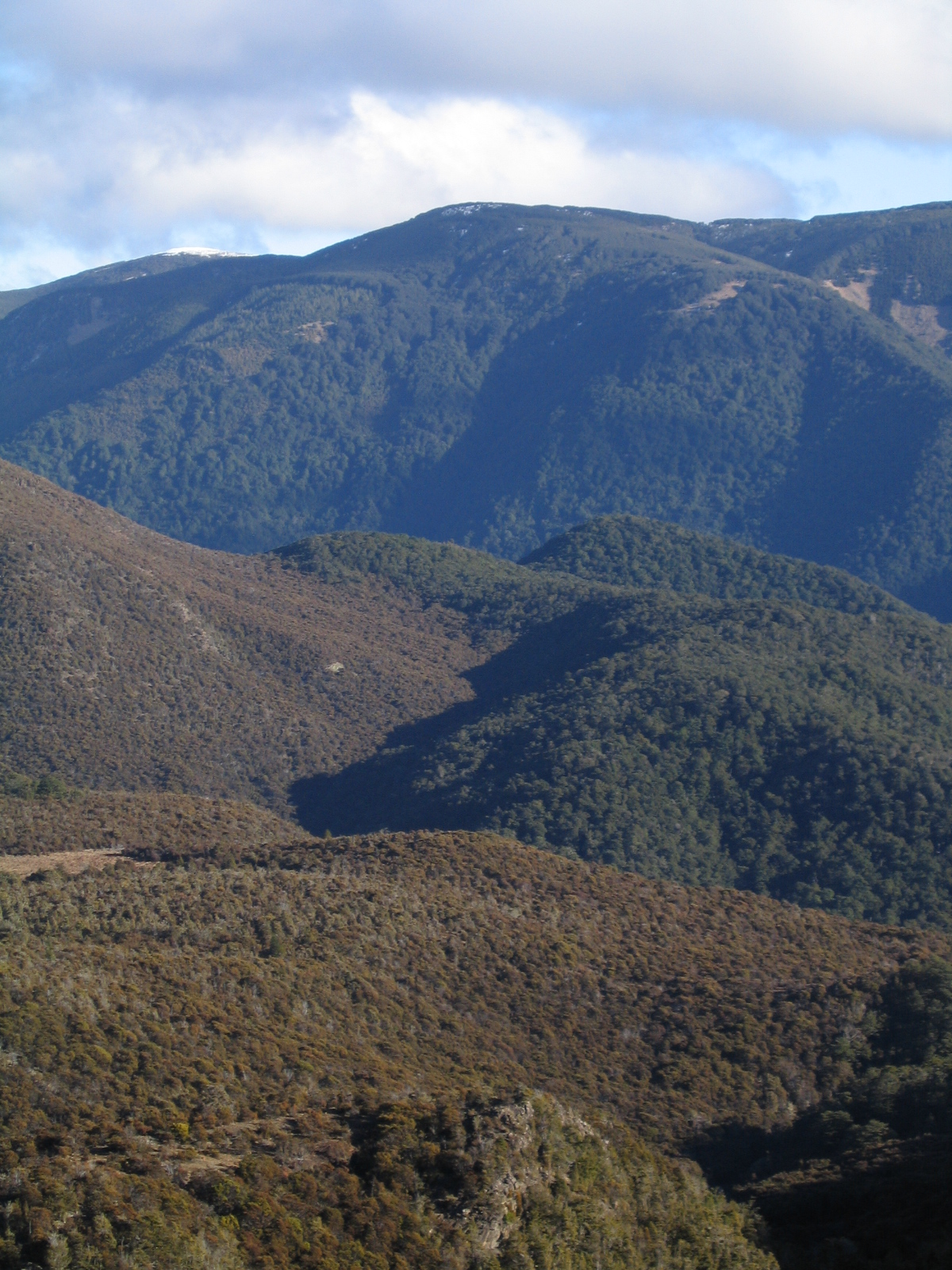
The effect of bedrock on soil and ecology. Ultramafic rock (left) and mafic rock (right).

New Zealand has many natural disturbances to its environment which endemic species have evolved to tolerate. These include local events with short return times like landslides, floods, el nino and fires (rare before the arrival of humans). Long term events like massive eruptions and glacial maxima have also affected the current distribution of species in New Zealand.

=== Soil ===
New Zealand's soils are affected by bedrock, climate, vegetation and the time it has had to develop, In the central North Island the felsic volcanic rocks is deficient in elements (like cobalt) needed by plants, while the rare ultramafic rocks of the South Island are so rich in required elements it is used as fertiliser. The warmer climate of Northland weathers rock more quickly leading to deeper soils. In Fiordland and similar wet steep environments landslides reduce the time for soil formation.

=== Climate ===
The main geographic factors that influence New Zealand's climate are the temperate latitude, with prevailing westerly winds; the oceanic environment; and the mountains, especially the Southern Alps. Conditions vary sharply across regions from extremely wet on the West Coast of the South Island to almost semi-arid in Central Otago and the Mackenzie Basin of inland Canterbury and subtropical in Northland. Historical maxima and minima are 42.4 °C (108.32 °F) in Rangiora, Canterbury and −25.6 °C (−14.08 °F) in Ranfurly, Otago.

== Ecosystems and ecology ==
New Zealand has a wide variety of ecosystems and classification methods for them. The biota of New Zealand is one of the most unusual on Earth, due to its long isolation from other continental landmasses. Its affinities are derived in part from Gondwana, from which it began to separate 82 million years ago (the break being complete by 66 Ma ago), some modest affinities with New Caledonia and Lord Howe Island, both of which are part of the same continental plate as New Zealand and in part from Australia.

New Zealand has a richly varied flora of imported and native species, the indigenous varieties having developed quite significantly due to the geographic isolation of the country before human migration and plant imports became common. However, the combination of external factors such as climate change and invasive species, as well as increasing agricultural and other human land uses have led to widespread damage. New Zealand's forest ecosystems for example are being considered as the second most endangered of the world, with only 7% of the natural habitat remaining.

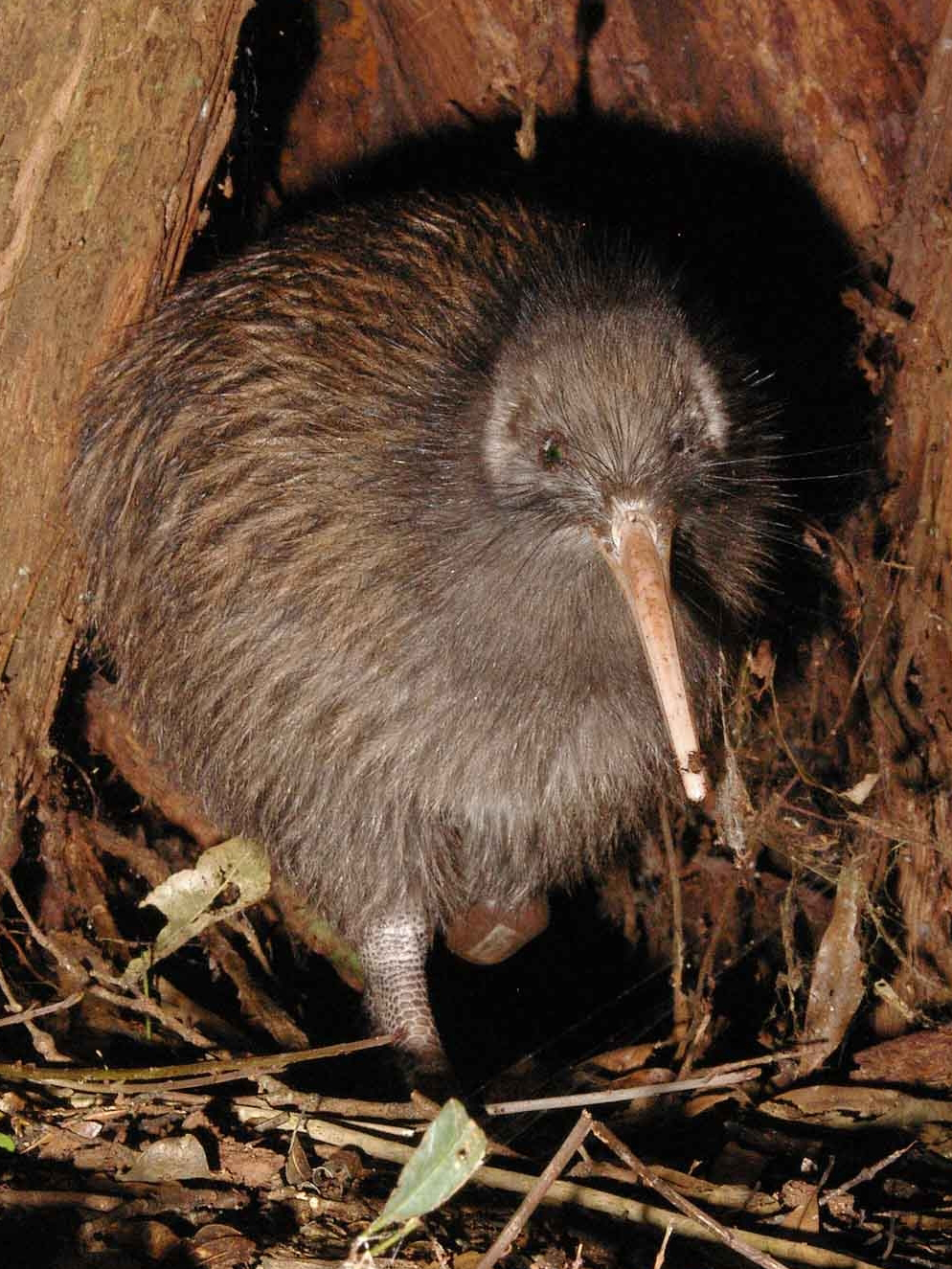
A male brown kiwi. Eighty per cent of New Zealand's biota is endemic.

New Zealand's biodiversity exhibits high levels of endemism, both in its flora and fauna. Until recently the islands had no native terrestrial mammals except for three species of bats (although terrestrial, "archaic" mammals did exist in New Zealand until 19 million years ago, in the form of the Saint Bathans mammal), the main component of the fauna being insects and birds. Its flora is dominated by Gondwanan plants, comprising historically of forests, most famously the giant kauri. Māori and European settlers introduced a wide range of mammals some of which have become serious invasive species. New Zealand has developed a national Biodiversity Action Strategy to address conservation of considerable numbers of threatened flora and fauna within New Zealand.

Conservationists recognised that threatened bird populations could be saved on offshore islands, where, once predators were exterminated, bird life flourished again. Around 30 species are listed as endangered. The flightless kiwi, a national symbol, is also under threat.

=== Forests ===
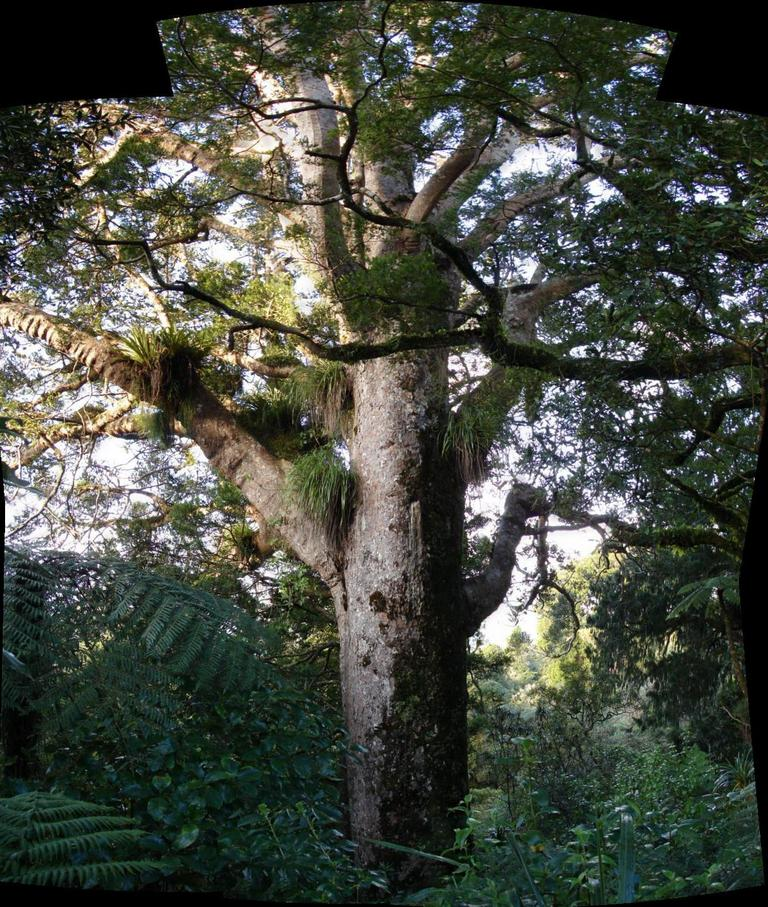
Kauri tree and epiphytes

Native New Zealand forests (or "the bush") are broadly divided into temperate (broadleaf) and beech forests, introduced pine forests also cover a large part of the country. Native deciduous plants are extremely rare, with only 11 species losing all their leaves in winter, none of which are common canopy forming trees. The beech forests are most common in high elevations and cold climates, while temperate forests dominate elsewhere. The temperate forests have a higher biodiversity partially in the canopy and undergrowth flora. It is common for New Zealand's forests to be referred to as rain forest particularly in the western high precipitation zones.

Temperate forests vary across the country, but prefer warmer environments to the beech forests. They are noted for the many canopy layers they have. Near the coast they become stunted due to salt and exposure to wind.

Beech forests are divided into four varieties based on the dominant tree species and their geographic distribution is largely related to elevation. Black beech (or hard beech) forests are found in the warmer lowlands of the North Island and northern South Island. Red beech are found in direr foothills, while silver beech occupy a similar elevation but prefer a wetter environment. Mountain beech are found at high elevation near the tree line, which in New Zealand is below 1000 m.

Beech trees do not flower every year, a year in which they flower is called a mast (or mast year). The effect of the whole canopy flowering at the same time introduces a lot of food into forest at once and leads to a population spike in those species that can quickly respond (typically mice).

New Zealand had a 2018 Forest Landscape Integrity Index mean score of 7.12/10, ranking it 55th globally out of 172 countries.

=== Grasslands ===
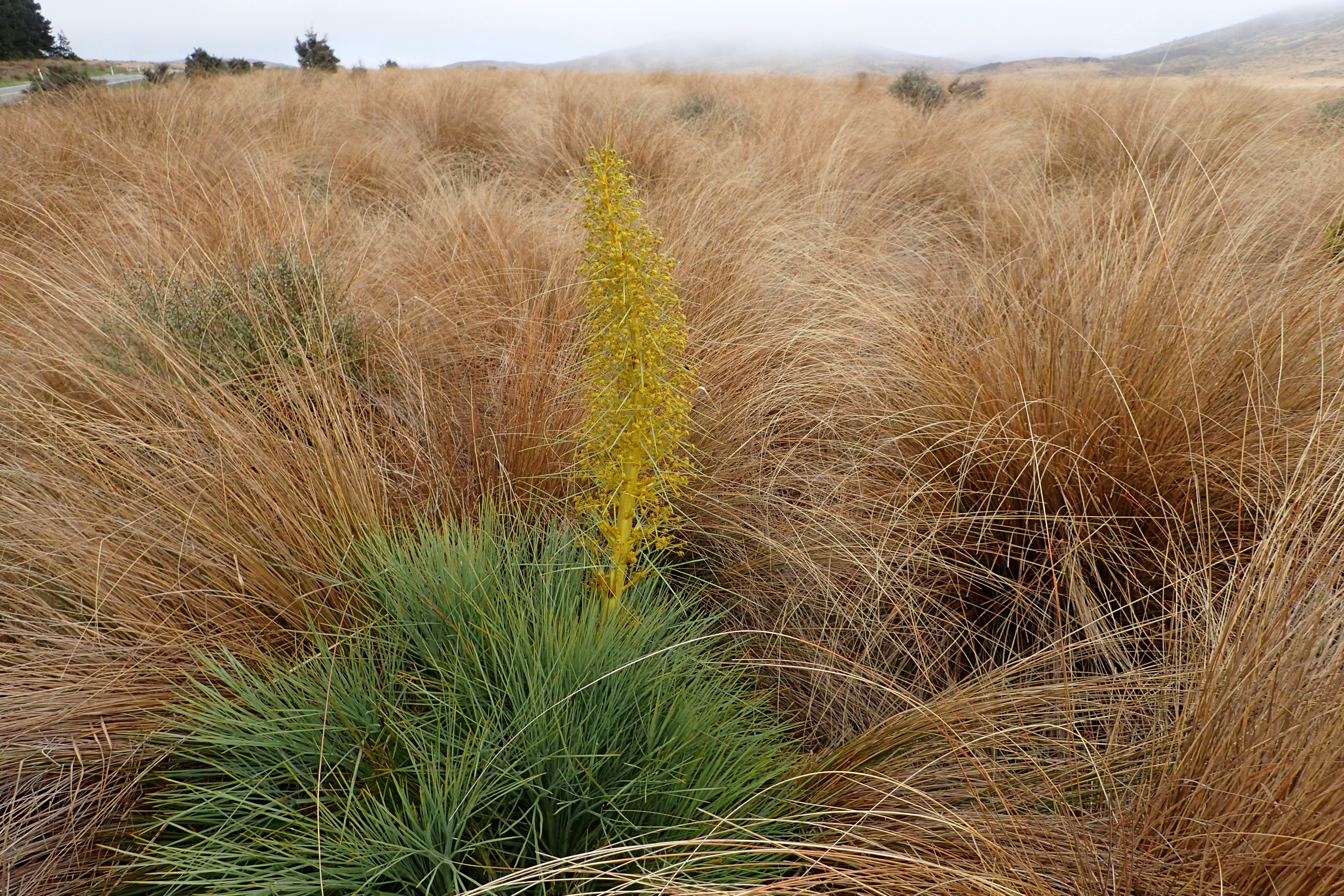
Red tussock and spear grass

New Zealand has extensive natural tussock grasslands in locations where elevation and climate has limited forest growth. This includes the Central Plateau in the North Island and extensive areas of the South Island between the tree line and the alpine environment. There are also smaller areas of tussock grassland on flood plains due to the constantly shifting substrate and greater likelihood of frost. New Zealand's grassland ecosystems evolved in the absence of grazing mammals. Birds (Moa) and invertebrates were the main browsers until the introduction of sheep, goats and deer in the 1800s. Multiple species of tussock are present and dominate at different elevations and climates, with the maximum size of the species decreasing with increasing altitude. Tussock grasslands also help transfer water from the upper to lower catchment due to comparatively low transpiration.

=== Alpine ===
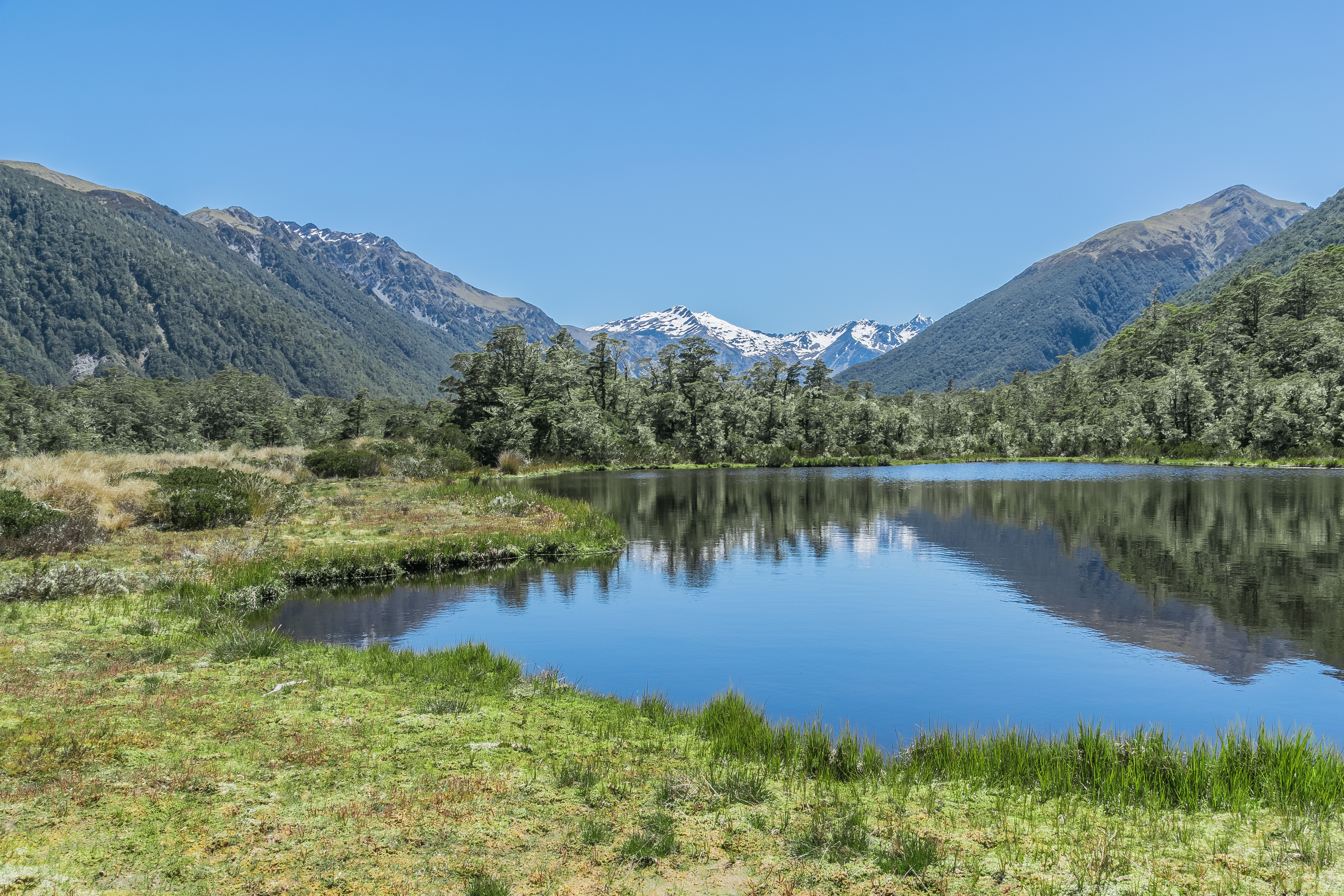
Sub alpine lake

New Zealand has two main ecosystems where cold and high winds limit biological activity. As the Southern Alps were uplifted relatively recently far from other mountain chains the New Zealand biota has quickly adapted to the new environment. Superficially New Zealand's sub-antarctic islands are similar to the sub alpine zone.

=== Rivers and wetlands ===
New Zealand lakes, rivers and wetlands are the most threatened of the countries major ecosystems. Many coastal rivers have been dammed and most of New Zealand's wetlands have been drained. The damming of river can greatly change the sediment content and water flow.

=== Coastal ===
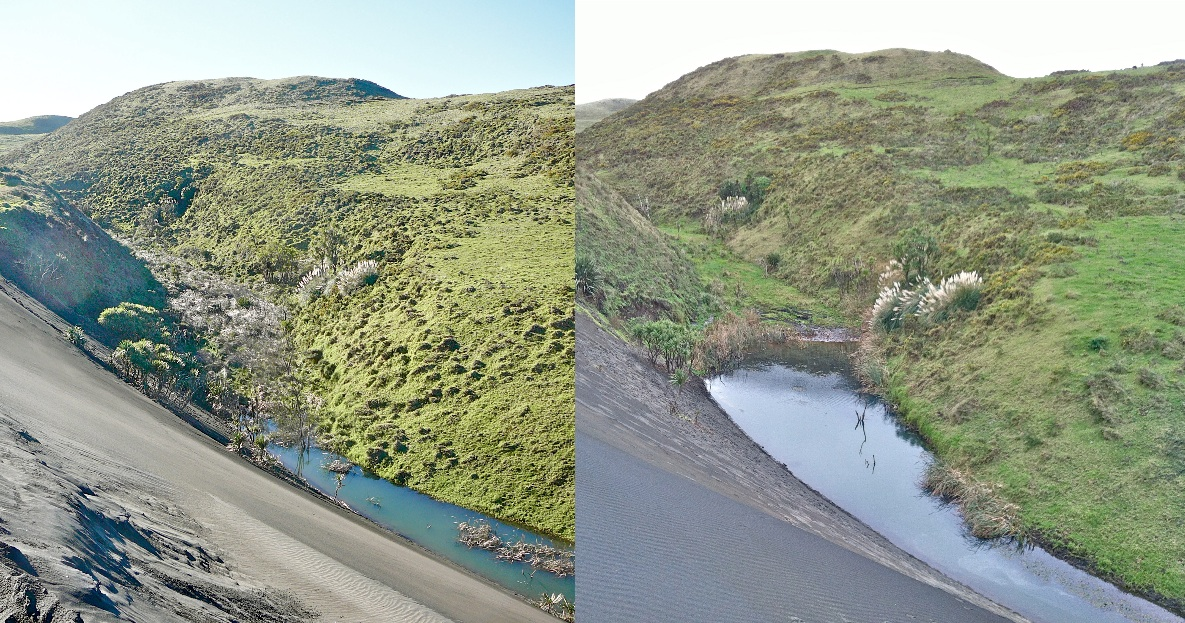
Sand dune lake Te Horea 2007–2012

Dune systems are constantly moving and plants have adapted to this environment. Vegetation is stunted due high winds and salt. In the North Island large mangrove forests have formed.

=== Marine ===
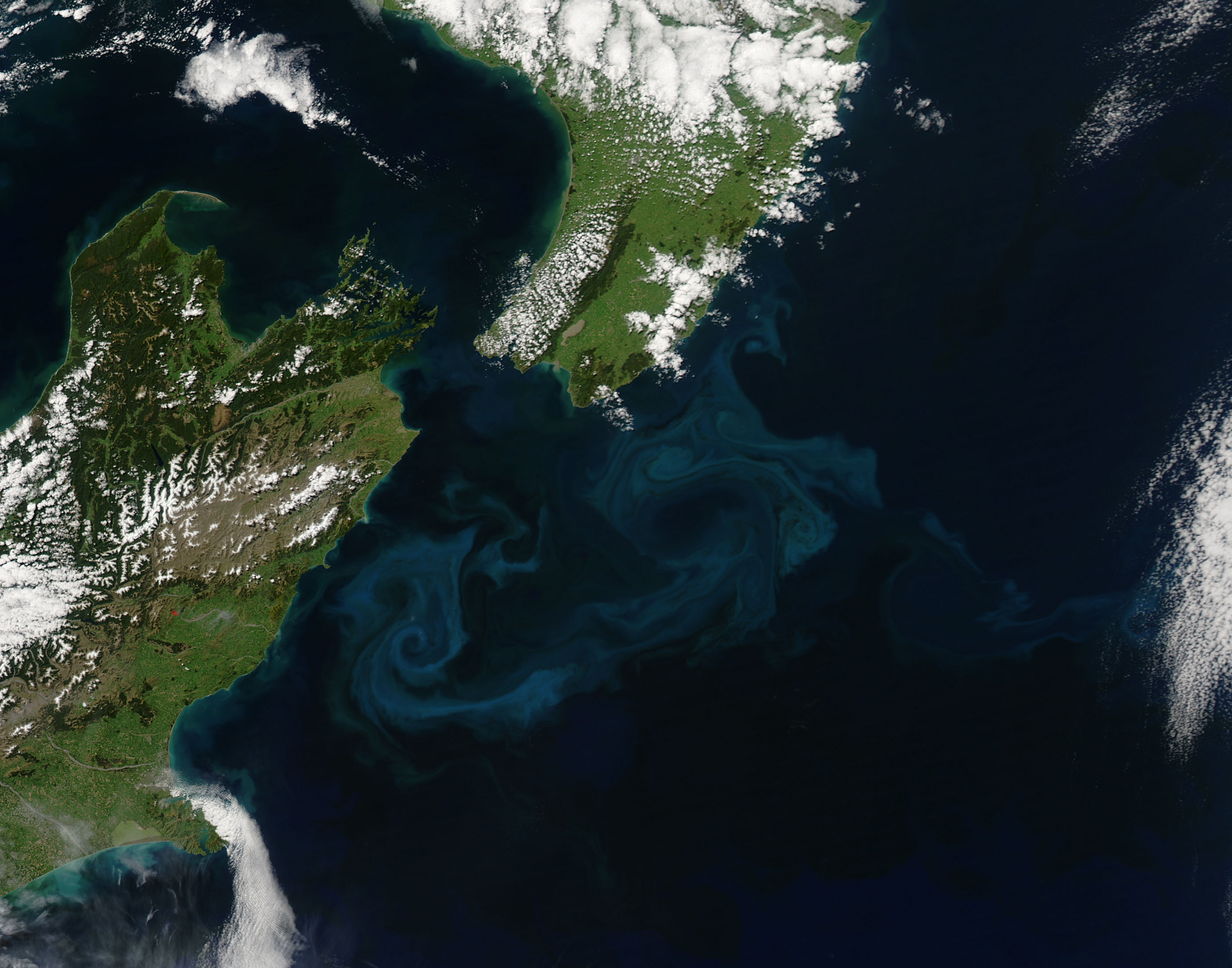
Large blooms of phytoplankton

Including the inter-tidal zone, the Marine ecosystem is by far New Zealand's largest and most diverse. It extends from the sub-tropics to sub antarctic waters, more than 30° of latitude. Less than 1% of the area has been surveyed in detail and about 150 new species are discovered every year. The marine environment has been heavily affected by fishing and the introduction of exotic species.

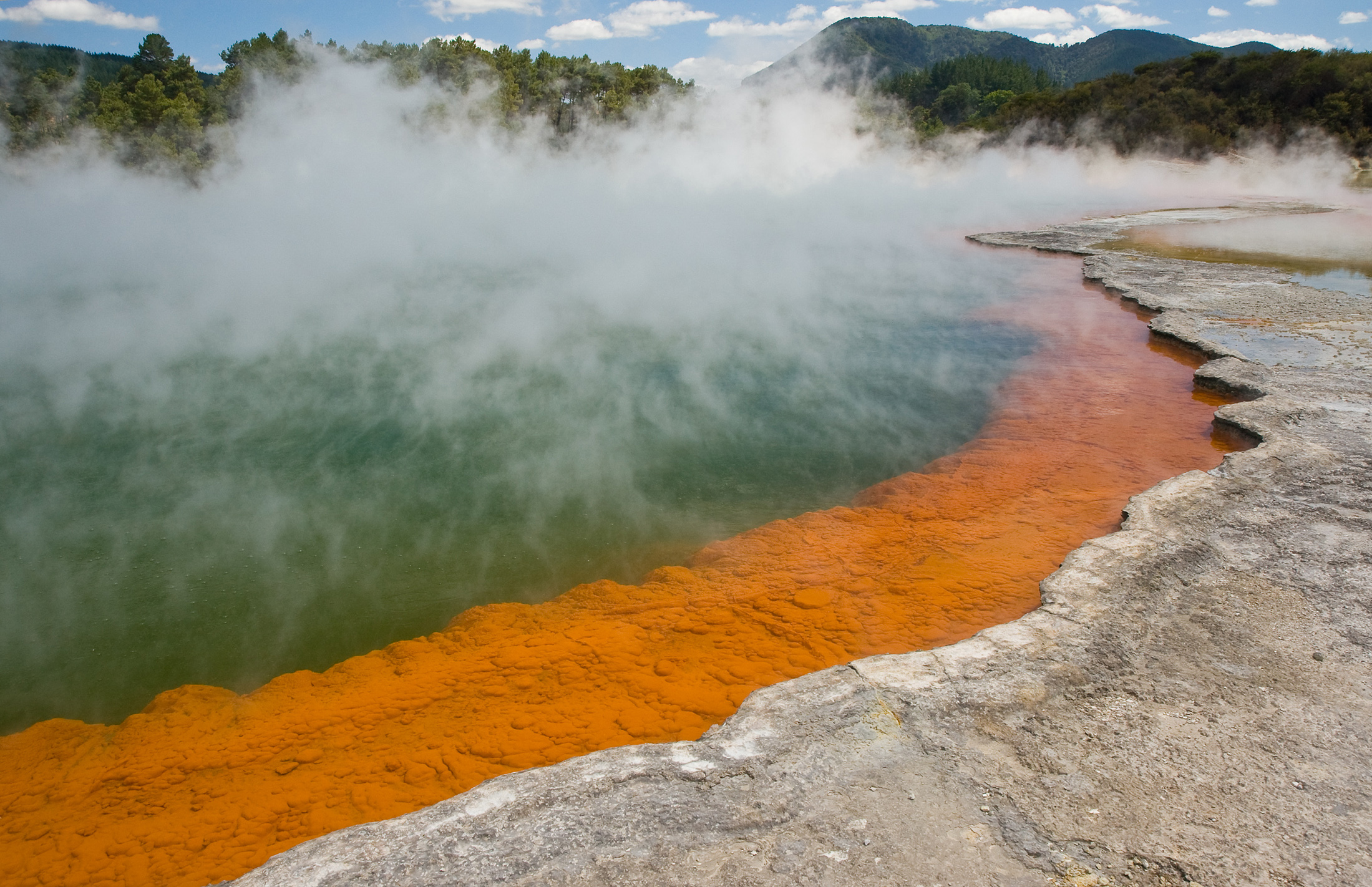
Hot pool ecosystem

=== Rare natural ecosystems ===
Currently there are 72 recognised rare terrestrial ecosystems in New Zealand. They are environments that were always relatively uncommon like caves, serpentine soils or hot springs and those which have become endangered. There are also ecosystems where the physical environment is largely controlled by animal activity, such as areas of significant guano deposition.

=== Cultural landscapes ===
Farmland and urban environments are marked by the high number of introduced species, that have not evolved to interact with each other in the same ecosystem. These landscapes can affect the local climate, such as the 2.5 °C temperature rise in Christchurch from the urban heat island effect or the decreased transpiration from farmland. This increase in soil water content and reduction in the stabilising effects of roots leaves deforested areas prone to soil loss and landslides.

== Unsustainable practices ==
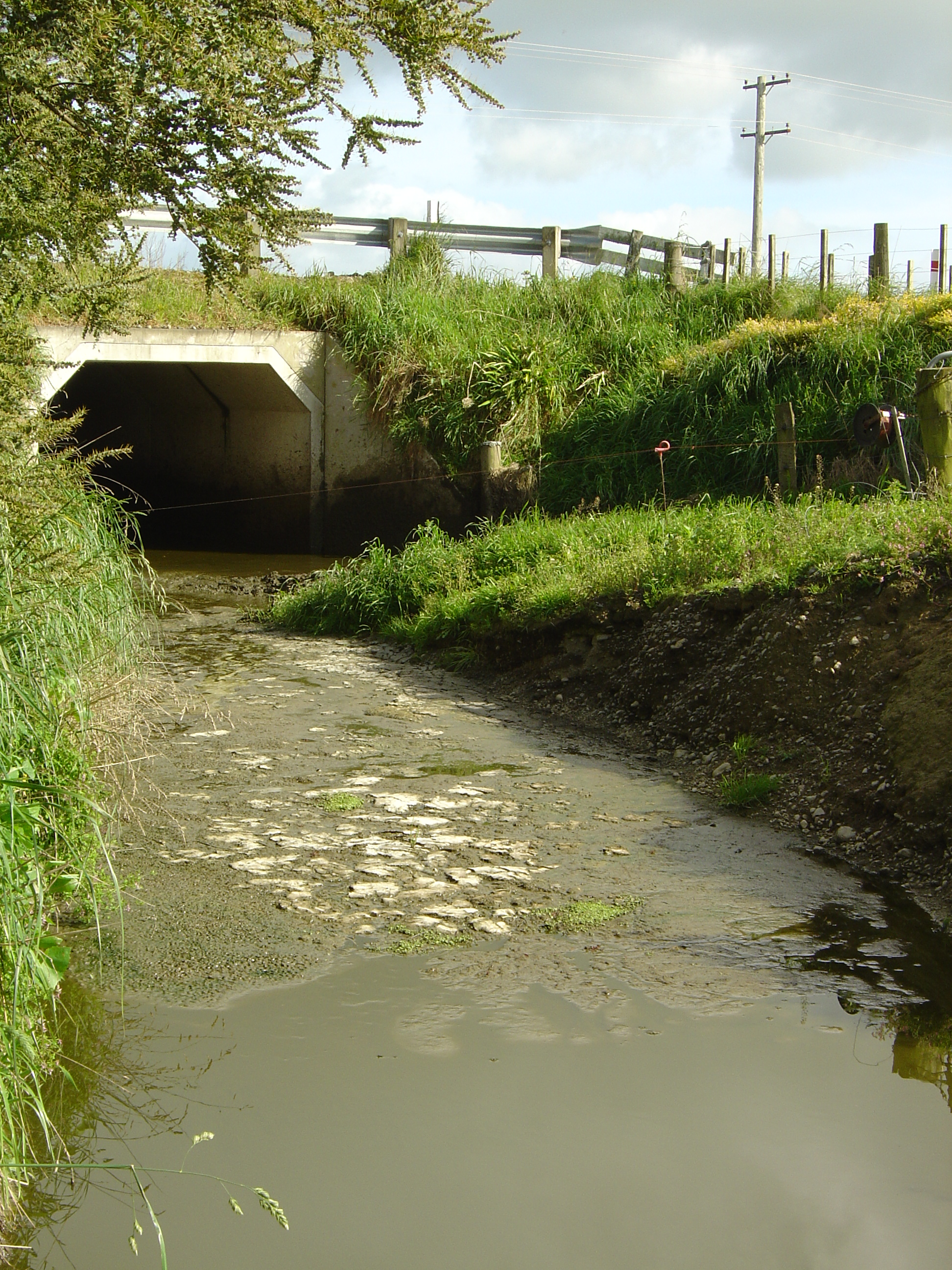
Water pollution due to dairy farming in the Wairarapa

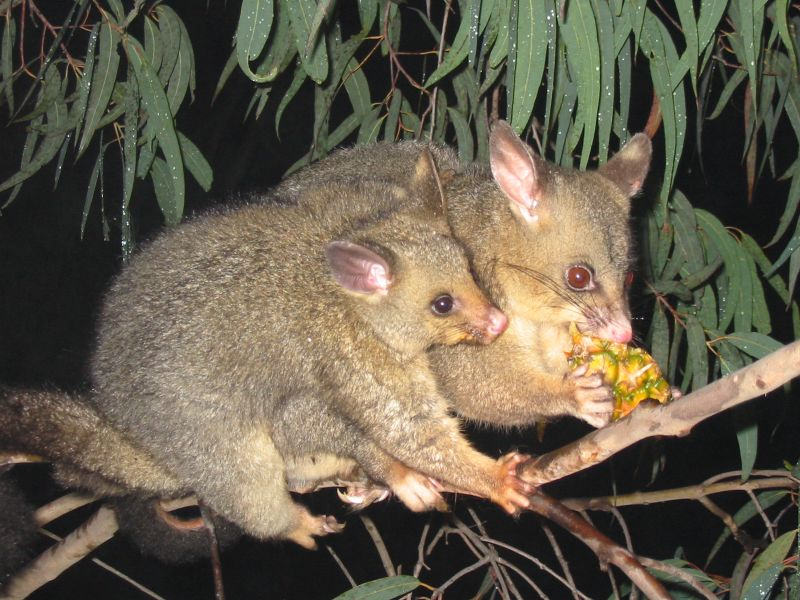
Common brushtail possums, an invasive pest in New Zealand whose population is controlled with 1080

As with many other countries there are a number of environmental organisations that are working towards addressing various environmental issues in New Zealand.

The move to carry out genetic engineering in New Zealand is opposed by environmentalists on economic and environmental grounds and the release of genetically modified organisms now has a strict regulatory regime under the Hazardous Substances and New Organisms Act 1996.

Mining in New Zealand often encounters opposition from environmentalists. Coal mining in the West Coast region is of concern and there are plans to start the Cypress Mine, the Escarpment Mine Project, the Mt William North Mining Project, as well as issues at the long established Stockton Mine. Lignite mining in the Southland region is also encountering opposition. Hydraulic fracturing (fracking) is also of concern. A proposed soapstone mine in the Cobb Valley has also raised environmental concerns.

Deforestation in New Zealand is now of negligible concern since logging indigenous forest on public land has ceased and it requires a permit to be carried out on privately owned land. In the past 800 years of human occupation New Zealand has lost about 75% of its forests due to deliberately lit fires and land clearance.

The management of waste in New Zealand has become more regulated to reduce associated environmental issues.

Water pollution in New Zealand is an ongoing issue. A 2009 study tested 300 rivers and streams around the Western world and found the Manawatū River was loaded with the highest gross primary production (GPP). High GPP rates are an indication of poor ecological health and can lead to various environmental issues. Fish and Game, a statutory government body, started a dirty dairying campaign to highlight water pollution due to dairy farming. It led to the creation in 2003 of the Dairying and Clean Streams Accord, a voluntary agreement between Fonterra, Ministry for the Environment, Ministry of Agriculture and Forestry, and regional councils.

in 2011 the Parliamentary Commissioner for the Environment claimed the use of 1080, a pesticide using sodium fluoroacetate, was "effective and safe". The government and Federated Farmers maintain it is an effective tool for controlling possums over large areas. However its use remains contentious, with debate between conservationists and livestock farmers on one side and hunters and animal rights activists on the other. Concerns are also raised about security of potable water supplies in areas where 1080 is applied.

== Environmental politics ==
=== Climate Policy ===
New Zealand pledged to reach zero GHG emissions by 2050. In September 2020, the Labour Party promised to advance a target of 100% energy from renewable sources by 2030.

=== Politics and public opinion ===
The Values Party, the first ever national level environmental party, was formed in 1973. The Green Party of Aotearoa New Zealand, which was formed in 1991 and included some members from the defunct Values Party, was initially in Parliament as part of the Alliance Party.

The level of protection of the environment from the different political parties varies, generally according to the weight they place on private compared to commonly held property rights over nature, and their position on the left-right political spectrum.

=== Environmental funding ===
There are a number of different sources for environmental funding in New Zealand.

The Nature Heritage Fund is a New Zealand Government funding body set up in 1990, and administered by the Department of Conservation, for the purchase of land which has significant ecological or landscape features.

To support community efforts, the Community Conservation Fund is available. Funding is for established community groups that have an ecological restoration project on public land that can be sustained after the two-year funding period.

There are also Biodiversity Funds.

=== Protected areas ===
Nearly 30 per cent of the land mass of New Zealand is in public ownership and has some degree of protection. The level of protection varies according to the land status. New Zealand also has nine wilderness areas where air access is limited, numerous "mainland islands" and marine reserves.

=== Environmental law ===
The roots of New Zealand environmental law can be traced to the common law of Britain. The increasing environmental awareness of the 1960s led to a specific body of environmental law that developed in many Western countries including New Zealand. Environmental law became more integrated in the 1980s with the passing of the Environment Act 1986 and the Conservation Act 1987. These Acts set up the Ministry for the Environment, Parliamentary Commissioner for the Environment and the New Zealand Department of Conservation.

The most significant Act of Parliament concerning environmental law was the passing of Resource Management Act in 1991. Issues under the Act are adjudicated by the Environment Court of New Zealand.

=== Treaties and international agreements ===
New Zealand is a signatory to a number of treaties and international agreements:

- The Framework Convention on Climate Change, 1992 – ratified on 8 September 1993
- The Convention on Biological Diversity, 1992 – ratified on 16 September 1993
- The Montreal Protocol on Substances that Deplete the Ozone Layer, 1989 – ratified on 21 July 1988
- The Antarctic Treaty, 1959 – ratified on 1 November 1960 – Convention for the Conservation of Antarctic Marine Living Resources, 1980 – ratified on 8 March 1982 – and others
- United Nations Convention on the Law of the Sea, 1982 – ratified on 19 July 1996
- The Basel Convention on the Control of Transboundary Movements of Hazardous Wastes and their Disposal, 1989 – ratified on 20 December 1994
- The Stockholm Convention on Persistent Organic Pollutants 2001 – ratified on 24 September 2004.
- Convention on the Prevention of Marine Pollution by Dumping of Wastes and Other Matter, 1971 (London [Dumping] Convention) – ratified on 30 April 1975 – and the International Convention for the Prevention of Pollution from Ships, 1973 – not yet ratified
- The Convention on International Trade in Endangered Species of Wild Flora and Fauna, 1973 – acceded to on 10 May 1989
- The Convention on Wetlands of International Importance especially as Waterfowl Habitat, 1971 (Ramsar Convention) – signed on 13 August 1976 with effect from 13 December 1976
- Convention for the Prohibition of Fishing with Long Driftnets in the South Pacific, 1989 (Wellington Convention) – ratified on 17 May 1991
- South Pacific Nuclear Free Zone Treaty, 1985 – ratified on 13 November 1986
- Convention for the Protection of the Natural Resources and Environment of the South Pacific Region, 1986 [SPREP] – ratified on 3 May 1990
- The Cartagena Protocol on Biosafety to the Convention on Biological Diversity – ratified on 24 February 2005

New Zealand is a depositary to the following environmental treaties:

- Convention on the Regulation of Antarctic Mineral Resource Activities
- Convention for the Conservation and Management of Highly Migratory Fish Stocks in the Western and Central Pacific Ocean (WCPFC)
- Convention for the Prohibition of Fishing with Long Driftnets in the South Pacific
- Protocol I to the Convention for the Prohibition of Fishing with Long Driftnets in the South Pacific
- Protocol II to the Convention for the Prohibition of Fishing with Long Driftnets in the South Pacific

== Evaluations of New Zealand's environmental performance ==
=== State of the Environment reporting ===
The Ministry for the Environment has produced a number of reports on the State of the Environment in 1997 in 2007, and 2016.

=== Environmental Performance Index ===
New Zealand's scores in the 2010 Environmental Performance Index

The Environmental Performance Index (EPI) is a method of quantifying and numerically benchmarking the environmental performance of a country's policies. It results in a score out of 100. In 2016 New Zealand scored 88 out of 100, and ranked 11 out of 132 countries. In 2010, in terms of ecosystem effects on water quality New Zealand scored 40.3 points out of 100 for ecosystem vitality for freshwater and was ranked 43rd out of 132 countries.

year	rank/total	EPI
2006	1/133	88.0
2008	7/149	88.9
2010	15/163	73.4
2012	14/132	66.1
2014	16/178	76.4
2016	11/132	88.0
2018	17/178	76.0

=== OECD environmental performance review ===
In 2007, the Organisation for Economic Co-operation and Development (OECD) conducted an environmental performance review of New Zealand. Some of the main conclusions and recommendations were that:

- energy intensity is about equal to the OECD average
- intensity of water, fertiliser, and pesticide use is low for OECD countries. However, the review period saw 'significant increases, with consequent growth in pressures on the environment'
- New Zealand should strengthen national policy guidance (policy statements, national environmental standards)
- New Zealand should further integrate environmental concerns into economic and sectoral decisions, particularly by using economic instruments to internalise environmental costs of economic activities
- New Zealand should further develop international environmental cooperation.

== See also ==
- Timeline of the New Zealand environment
- Natural history of New Zealand
- Sustainability in New Zealand
- Waste in New Zealand
  - Electronic waste in New Zealand
  - Food waste in New Zealand
  - Litter in New Zealand
- Conservation in New Zealand
  - Invasive species in New Zealand
  - List of New Zealand animals extinct in the Holocene
- Environmental movement in New Zealand
- Pollution in New Zealand
  - Water pollution in New Zealand
  - Pesticides in New Zealand
  - Dirty dairying
- Deforestation in New Zealand
- Climate change in New Zealand
- Dark sky movement in New Zealand

== The New Zealand environment in film ==
- Wild South series
- He Ao Wera – a documentary by Mike Smith and Hinekaa Mako about the effects of climate change on communities in Aotearoa.
- Earth Whisperers/Papatuanuku – this Kathleen Gallagher film was shot around New Zealand by cameramen Alun Bollinger and Mike Single. It focuses on 10 visionary New Zealanders out to prove that a shift in consciousness can heal our environment.
