= Deforestation in New Zealand =

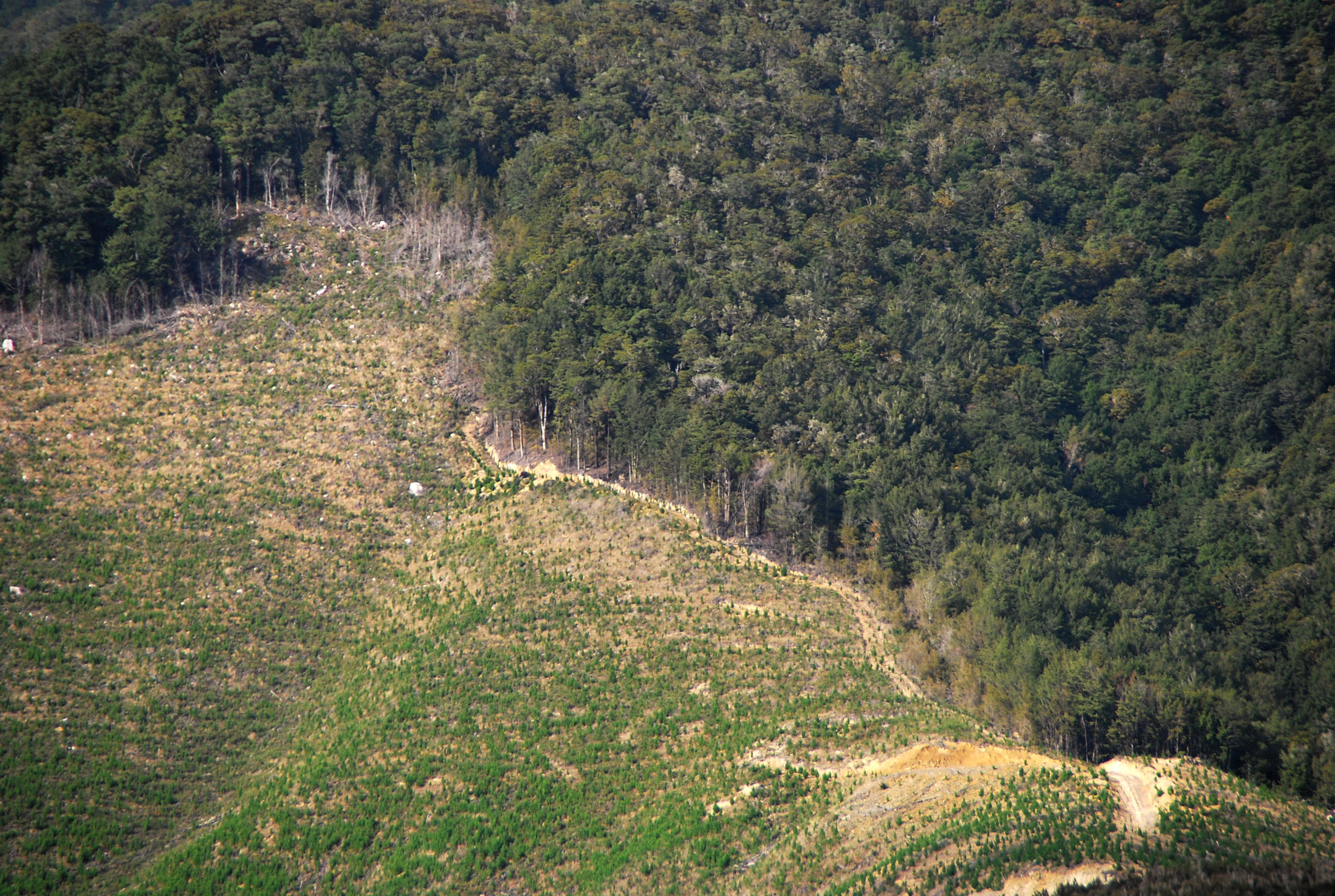
Deforestation in Tasman, South Island

Deforestation in New Zealand has been a contentious environmental issue in the past, but native forests (colloquially called "the bush") now have legal protection, and are not allowed to be tampered with by humans.

== Pre-human forest cover ==
Since New Zealand was the last major landmass to be settled by humans, anthropological changes are easier to study than in countries with a longer human history. A picture of the vegetation cover has been built up through the use of archaeological and fossil remains, especially pollen grains from old forests. Intact forests are found on Stewart Island and Ulva Island, but during the Pleistocene these areas would have been covered in grass and shrubland. During the last glacial maximum podocarp, broadleaf and beech forest grew in the far north of New Zealand.

== Māori settlement ==
Prior to Māori arrival, New Zealand was almost entirely forested, besides high alpine regions and those areas affected by volcanic activity. Māori began settling the country about 1000 years ago and by 1840, when Europeans were a small part of the total population, the forest cover was significantly reduced from 85% down to 53%.

== European settlement ==
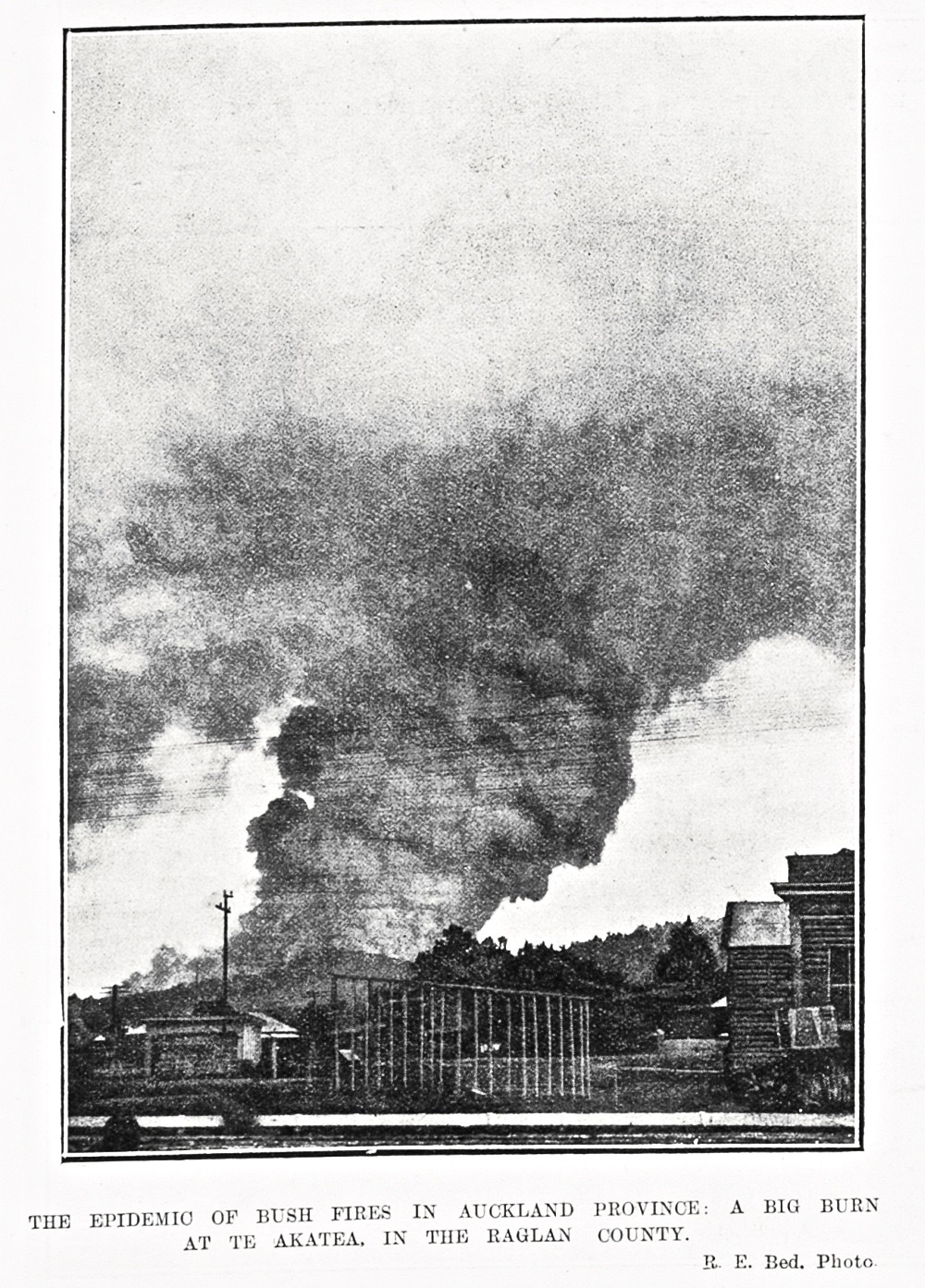
A photo from the Auckland Weekly News (9 March 1911) shows smoke billowing above the horizon, with the caption "The epidemic of bush fires in Auckland Province".

When the first Europeans arrived, in 1769, there was still thick, dense forest cover. Early explorers such as Cook and Banks described the land as "immense woods, lofty trees and the finest timber". Timber was mainly used for repairs to sailing ships until the 19th century. With the colony of New South Wales rapidly expanding in population, the need for timber from New Zealand began to rise. Timber exports, mainly kauri, became a major industry for New Zealand. There are records from the 1840s stating that 50 to 100 ships could be tied to shore in Kaipara Harbour and be filled with lumber from giant floating booms that could hold 10,000 logs at a time. Besides as a form of lumber, many pioneers found the kauri trees valuable for the gum they produced to make varnish and linoleum, primarily in the north island near Auckland. The colonists used unconventional methods to gather this gum from living trees. Stripping these trees and the ground around them resulted in the destruction of the land, rendering it unusable for agriculture (Wynn pg. 108). Without the trees to hold the soil and debris to the land, water flowed freely, causing frequent and regular flooding. As most of New Zealand was covered with thick bush, the slash-and-burn technique was often used to prepare land wanted for farming in forested areas. This practice was not carried out very responsibly due to the complexity of controlling a fire, and unintentionally resulted in large areas of land catching fire. Thousands of acres were accidentally burned and destroyed.

After the Treaty of Waitangi was signed in 1840, settlers began a rapid expansion. Deforestation continued for many uses, including clearing land for farming and gardens and wood for construction. An estimated 50,000 acres (200 km^{2}) of land was also lost due to human-caused forest fires within only a few days. Settlers were often granted land, such as the Homesteads, with a condition that they forfeited it if they did not clear enough bush.

The rising rate of deforestation can be correlated with a sudden rise in sawmill usage. There were only six sawmills in 1843, twelve in 1847, fifteen in 1855 and ninety-three in 1868, a growth of more than fifteen times in twenty-five years. Many saw-milling settlements were in turn supported by becoming railroad stops, leading to more clearance and job availability. With time, the mills also became more productive. These factors helped create an exponential rate of deforestation across the country.

Although in 1885 the State Forest Department set aside forests to protect timber resources, for 100 years New Zealand farmers were paid incentives or provided with subsidies to clear land of trees or "improve" land for agriculture. Half of New Zealand is now converted to agricultural land, for example most of the river flats of the west coast are now pastures. Removing forests contributed to the extinction of endemic species. By removing New Zealand native forest, humans created a landscape with the climatic conditions to allow the short-horned grasshopper Phaulacridium marginale to expand its range across the country.

== Recent history ==
By the 1970s, the environmental movement started direct action to protect New Zealand's forests. Notable direct action campaigns were at Pureora Forest with Stephen King and the West Coast with the Native Forest Action Council and Native Forest Action. All native forest logging on public land ended in 2002 when the Labour-led government upheld its election promise to stop the logging.

In 2005, forestry covered over 80,000 km^{2} (31,000 sq mi), or 29% of the country, made up of 63,000 km^{2} (24,000 sq mi) of native forest and 17,000 km^{2} (6,600 sq mi) of planted forests. That Stats NZ estimate was made up of areas over 0.5 ha (1.2 acres) with at least 10% crown cover and a potential minimum height of 5 m (16 ft) at maturity.

Other measurements vary, so that one 2010 estimate, based on MPI figures, put native forest at 65,000 km^{2} (25,000 sq mi) (24%) and total tree cover at 30%, but another that same year said 31.40% of New Zealand was covered by forest. This does not include orchards or trees in parks. This figure has been slowly but steadily rising since 1998. By 2018 the estimated planted area had risen to 17,300 km^{2} (6,700 sq mi).

== Forest protection ==
Many legal avenues now exist to protect New Zealand's native forests. The Resource Management Act, a major Act of Parliament that was passed in 1991, affords any natural environment a level of legal protection through the resource consent process. The logging of native trees is governed by a permit system administered by the Ministry for Primary Industries (MPI) and must be shown to be sustainable. The number of sawmills registered for cutting native trees dropped from 672 in 1959, to 652 in 1984 and in 2024 there were around 150 Sustainable Forest Management permits.

MPI also formulates policy on national and international illegal logging.

In 2014 special legislation was passed to allow the extraction of large numbers of rimu trees which had toppled in a storm in the South Island. In early periods, rimu was the timber widely used in construction. After 1950, it was replaced with treated exotic Pinus radiata, but small amounts were milled for furniture into the 1990s.

== See also ==
- Deforestation by region
- Environment of New Zealand
- Forestry in New Zealand
- Holocene extinction event
- Royal Forest and Bird Protection Society of New Zealand
- Climate change in New Zealand
- Pollution in New Zealand
