= Litter Act 1979 =

The Litter Act 1979 may refer to:

- Litter Act 1979 (New Zealand)
- Litter Act 1979 (Western Australia)
