= Fracking in New Zealand =

Fracking has been carried out in New Zealand since 1989, mostly in Taranaki and also in coal seams in Waikato and Southland. Concerns have been raised about its negative effects and some local government jurisdictions have called for a moratorium on fracking but this has been rejected by the government. The environmental effects of fracking are regulated by the Resource Management Act (RMA) through the requirement for resource consents.

== History ==
Fracking has been carried out in the Taranaki Region since 1989 and the technique has been used on over 50 wells in the Taranaki and Waikato Regions. L&M Minerals have applied for exploration permits for coal seam gas extraction off the coast of South Canterbury and on the Canterbury Plains.

In 2012, the Taranaki Regional Council published a report that found there had been 65 hydraulic fracturing activities in 39 wells with no evidence of any related environmental problems. The report also found that the risk of contaminating freshwater aquifers was very low. Since August 2011, the Taranaki Regional Council has required resource consents for all subsurface fracturing discharges.

In 2012, the Parliamentary Commissioner for the Environment (PCE) undertook an investigation into the environmental impacts of fracking in New Zealand. This interim report stated that environmental risks can be effectively managed.

Also in 2012, Christchurch became the first city in New Zealand to declare itself a "fracking-free zone" after a probable link between earthquakes and hydraulic fracturing was demonstrated in England.

In 2013, the Prime Minister John Key stated that hydraulic fracturing had been going on safely in Taranaki for the past 30 years without any issues.

In 2014, the PCE published a report on oil and gas drilling and fracking. The scope of this report was widened following feedback on the interim report, based on which the PCE concluded that concern was not about fracking per se, but about the spread of the industry that fracking enabled. The PCE found no evidence of major environment problems and that risks of a major problem are low, if best practices are followed. However, the PCE also found that New Zealand's oversight and regulation was not adequate for managing the environmental risks. The 2014 report sets out recommendations to address regulatory shortcomings and concludes that the ultimate threat is climate change. The government is considering the PCE recommendations to improve regulatory oversight.

== Opposition ==
Environmentalists have raised concerns about fracking citing concerns about water pollution and induced seismicity. Four local councils have called for a moratorium on fracking; Christchurch City Council, Selwyn District Council, Kaikōura District Council and Waimakariri District Council. In 2012, community boards in Christchurch and in the South Taranaki district, where fracking is taking place, called for a ban. The Energy and Resources Minister Phil Heatley stated that the RMA gives sufficient safeguards.

Straterra, the industry group for the New Zealand resource and mining sectors, believes that the fracking carried out in New Zealand is safe.

In April 2012, the Christchurch City Council voted unanimously to declare the city a fracking-free zone. Any resource consents required for fracking would be lodged with Environment Canterbury, the regional council with jurisdiction over underground discharges, so the fracking-free zone is largely symbolic. A spokesperson for Environment Canterbury said that the regional council has no specific rules relating to fracking but there are existing policies that would apply to applications for fracking.

In New Zealand, an inquiry into fracking was undertaken by the Parliamentary Commissioner for the Environment, Dr Jan Wright. A preliminary report recommended tighter regulation on the practice, but stopped short of pushing for a moratorium. The New Zealand Government welcomed the report, but the Opposition doubted the government's commitment on introducing tighter laws. Dr Wright said she couldn't rule out the possibility fracking could cause large earthquakes, like the series of tremors that destroyed much of Christchurch over 2010 and 2011 Environmental Defence Society Chairman Gary Taylor said he was pleased Dr Wright had examined the overarching issue of climate change given the Government's gutting of climate change policy and bias towards fossil fuels. Taylor called for more balanced policy where renewables are given priority and carbon is priced properly.

== See also ==
- Energy in New Zealand
- Environment of New Zealand
