= Clean Air Act 1972 =

Act of Parliament in New Zealand

New Zealand Parliament
- Long title: An Act to promote the conservation of the air and the abatement of the pollution thereof
- Commenced: 1 April 1973

Legislative history
- Passed: 1972

Repeals
- Resource Management Act 1991
- Status: Repealed

The Clean Air Act 1972 was an Act of Parliament passed in New Zealand in 1972. It aimed to regulate industrial pollution by establishing a licensing system for permissible emission levels. This legislation also enhanced the monitoring of air quality in major urban centers and allowed for the creation of clean air zones by local authorities, as was done in Christchurch. The Act represented an early effort to reduce pollution from both residential and industrial sources. It was repealed by the Resource Management Act 1991.

== See also ==
- Pollution in New Zealand
