= Community Conservation Fund =

The Community Conservation Fund is a fund made available in New Zealand for conservation projects. It is administered by the Department of Conservation.

== History ==
The loss of biodiversity of New Zealand due to human activity is well documented, and there have been various methods of going at least part way towards restoration of indigenous ecosystems. Numerous community groups around New Zealand carry out ecological restoration projects on a volunteer basis using native plants to reestablish what was lost in the past. The Community Conservation Fund is aimed at assisting these groups.

The fund, secured by the Green Party in the 2008 Budget, was launched on 24 September 2008. It is a $4 million fund with $40,000 made available per project per year.

== Eligibility ==
There will be three funding rounds during 2008 and 2010 and it has a number of conditions for eligibility. Funding is only given to established community groups that have an ecological restoration project on public land that can be sustained after the two year funding period.

== See also ==
- Conservation in New Zealand
- Environment of New Zealand
