= Litter in New Zealand =

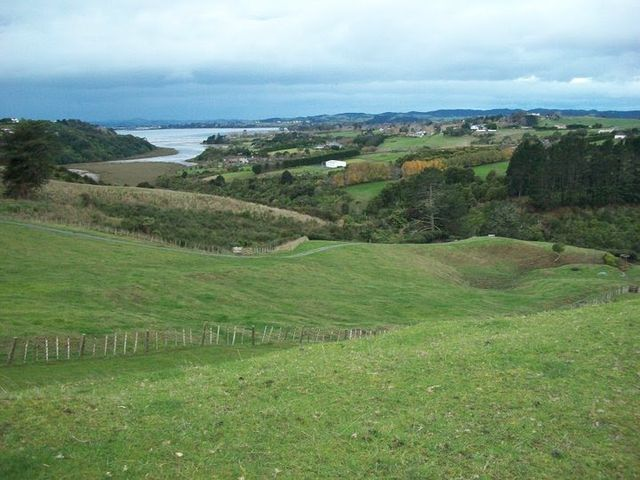
View of 'clean, green' countryside in Auckland

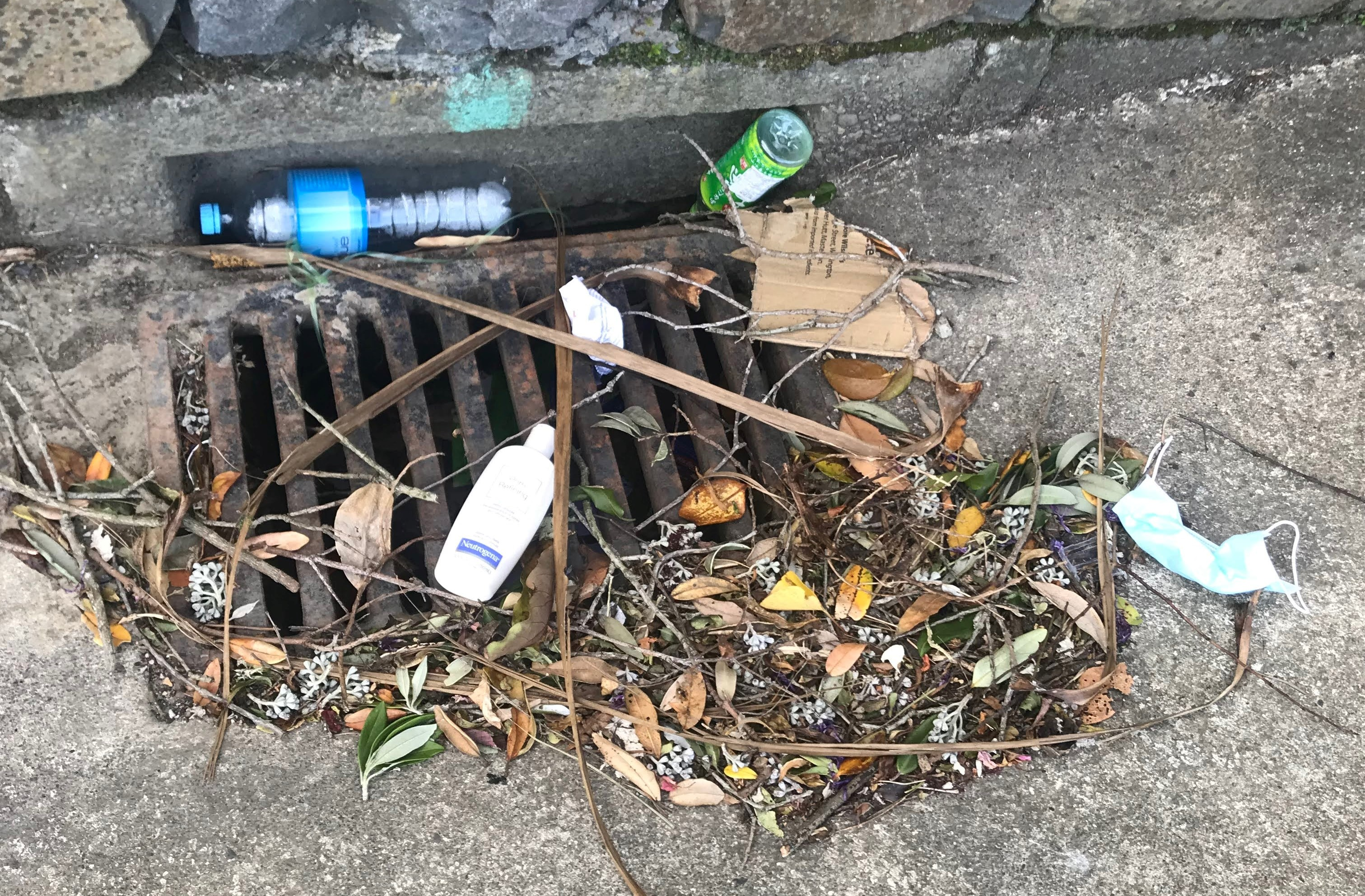
Litter in a stormwater drain in Wellington

Litter is a global issue and has a significant human impact on the environment. It is especially hazardous because it can enter ecosystems and harm a country's biodiversity. Litter is a prevalent environmental issue in New Zealand.

New Zealanders are known to take pride in their 'clean green' image. A national survey conducted in December 2017 revealed that 99% of respondents considered the maintenance of New Zealand's 'clean green' image to be of importance. For these reasons the prevention of litter is considered to be of national importance. While New Zealand is considered an environmentally conscious country, it continues to encounter litter issues. Plastic items are recorded to be the most littered item in the country. Cigarette butts and plastic bags are some of the most littered item worldwide and are therefore also pervasive in New Zealand's bird wildlife. Plastic litter is a particularly harmful form of litter as it threatens the New Zealand environment and the wildlife that inhabits it. Due to littering, New Zealand's endangered species are at risk of extinction. The National Litter Audit revealed that 80% of the litter found in the country's waterways originated from the land. Plastic litter in particular threatens wildlife because it contaminates the water and therefore poses health risks to marine wildlife and seabirds.

The Keep New Zealand Beautiful organisation was founded in 1967. The 1979 Litter Act established the organisation as the national body responsible for the promotion of litter control in New Zealand. Since 2018, Keep New Zealand Beautiful has released national reports concerning the issue of litter in New Zealand's regions. The National Litter Behaviour Study was released in 2018 and the Litter Audit was released in 2019. These reports have informed a response to litter in New Zealand. Policy measures for litter abatement include fines and a national action plan to reduce plastics. Further strategies for litter abatement include educational programmes and campaigns, most of which are developed by Keep New Zealand Beautiful.

== Environmental impact of littering ==
New Zealanders are known to take pride in their 'clean green' image. While it is considered an environmentally conscious country, litter remains an ongoing issue. Following the research released in the 2019 National Litter Audit, chief executive of the Keep New Zealand Beautiful organisation, Heather Saunderson, has stated that litter remains a considerably large environmental issue in New Zealand. Litter is especially hazardous because it can enter ecosystems and harm New Zealand's biodiversity.

=== Litter in waterways and the ocean ===
The 2019 National Litter Audit revealed that 80% of the litter found in the country's waterways originated from the land. The most common environmental pollutant found in waterways and marine life is plastic. Deliberate littering and illegal dumping are amongst the main contributors to plastic waste in New Zealand. Through the monitoring of beach litter, a 2019 environmental report conducted by the New Zealand charity Sustainable Coastlines and supported by the New Zealand Ministry for the Environment and Statistics New Zealand has identified plastic pollution to be the most common form of litter on New Zealand beaches. The Our marine environment 2019 report revealed 61% of litter on beaches to be of a plastic material and 11% of the plastic litter found on the country's beaches came from cigarettes. The second most common item were either glass or ceramic. These made up 21.7% of all items collected. The report revealed that the effect of single-use plastic poses a significant threat on the country's marine life.

=== Impact of plastic litter on wildlife ===
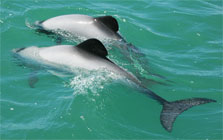
Māui dolphins

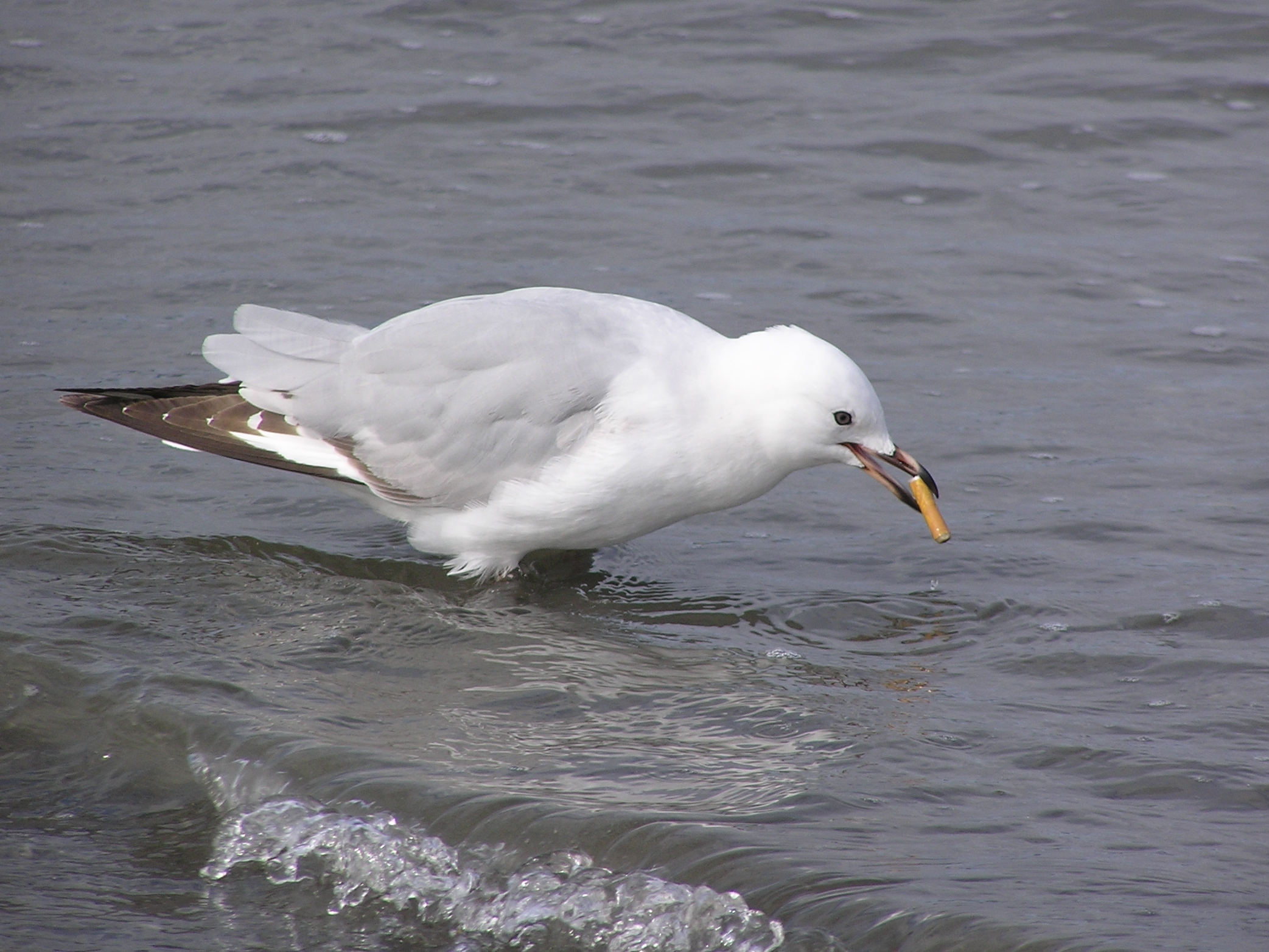
A red billed gull with a cigarette butt in Wellington

An estimated 30% of New Zealand's biodiversity reside in the sea. Of these 90% of seabirds, 80% of shorebirds and 22% of marine mammals are threatened with or at risk of becoming extinct. In addition, almost half of the world's whales, dolphins and porpoises have been recorded in New Zealand waters. Plastic pollution is one of the biggest contributors to the threat of extinction. Microplastics which are less than 5 millimetres in length are particularly dangerous pollutants because they are easily ingested by marine life. For animals on land and in the water, the ingestion of plastic reduces their intake of essential nutrients, traffic their digestive tracts, and negatively affect reproductive behaviour. Plastic materials also easily absorb toxins which, when ingested by larger animals like marine mammals, can cause death. Toxins easily absorbed by plastics include persistent organic pollutants and heavy metals. In addition, plastics are already manufactured with harmful chemicals. For these reasons plastic litter contaminates water and poses a significant health risk to wildlife.

Plastics have been reported in fish, seabirds, and shellfish. Because they resemble food and are ubiquitous in the environment due to issues like littering, microplastics are easily ingested by animals. The prevalence of plastic debris means that marine mammals are at risk of becoming trapped in or wounded by drifting materials. They are also at risk of ingesting plastic debris. The New Zealand Department of Conservation has reported that Māui dolphins, a critically endangered subspecies of the Hector's dolphin, are at risk of dying from marine litter. Māui dolphins are endemic to New Zealand's North Island where they are known to occupy harbours where commercial and amateur fisheries are located.

Research conducted by the Royal Society of New Zealand has shown the country's seabirds to be at risk of consuming plastic with the earliest discovery of plastic ingestion dating back to 1958. One-third of all species of seabirds inhabit New Zealand. The country is also the main breeding ground for the highest number of seabird species globally. For these reasons, New Zealand has been described as being the "seabird capital of the world". 86 of the 360 global seabird species breed in New Zealand, 37 are endemic to New Zealand, meaning they breed nowhere else in the world. The prevalence of plastic pollution on New Zealand coasts means seabirds are increasingly at risk of eating plastics. A 2019 report on Plastics and the environment states that New Zealand is:

"...home to one-third of all species of seabird and the breeding ground for the highest number of seabird species worldwide. Because of this, plastic debris in our seas poses a higher risk to seabird populations and efforts to protect these species and their ecosystems by preventing plastic in the environment are crucial."

Forest and Bird, a non-profit conservation organisation, has warned that birds like shearwaters and albatross can not distinguish floating plastic from fish. The pervasive ingestion of plastic seen in New Zealand's seabirds since the first earliest recorded observation in 1958 means plastic pollution is one of the primary reasons why 90% of the country's seabirds are at risk of extinction. Because New Zealand is home to and hosts such a large population of seabirds, the risk of extinction posed by plastics is considered the worst in New Zealand than anywhere else in the world.

=== Impact of organic litter on birdlife ===
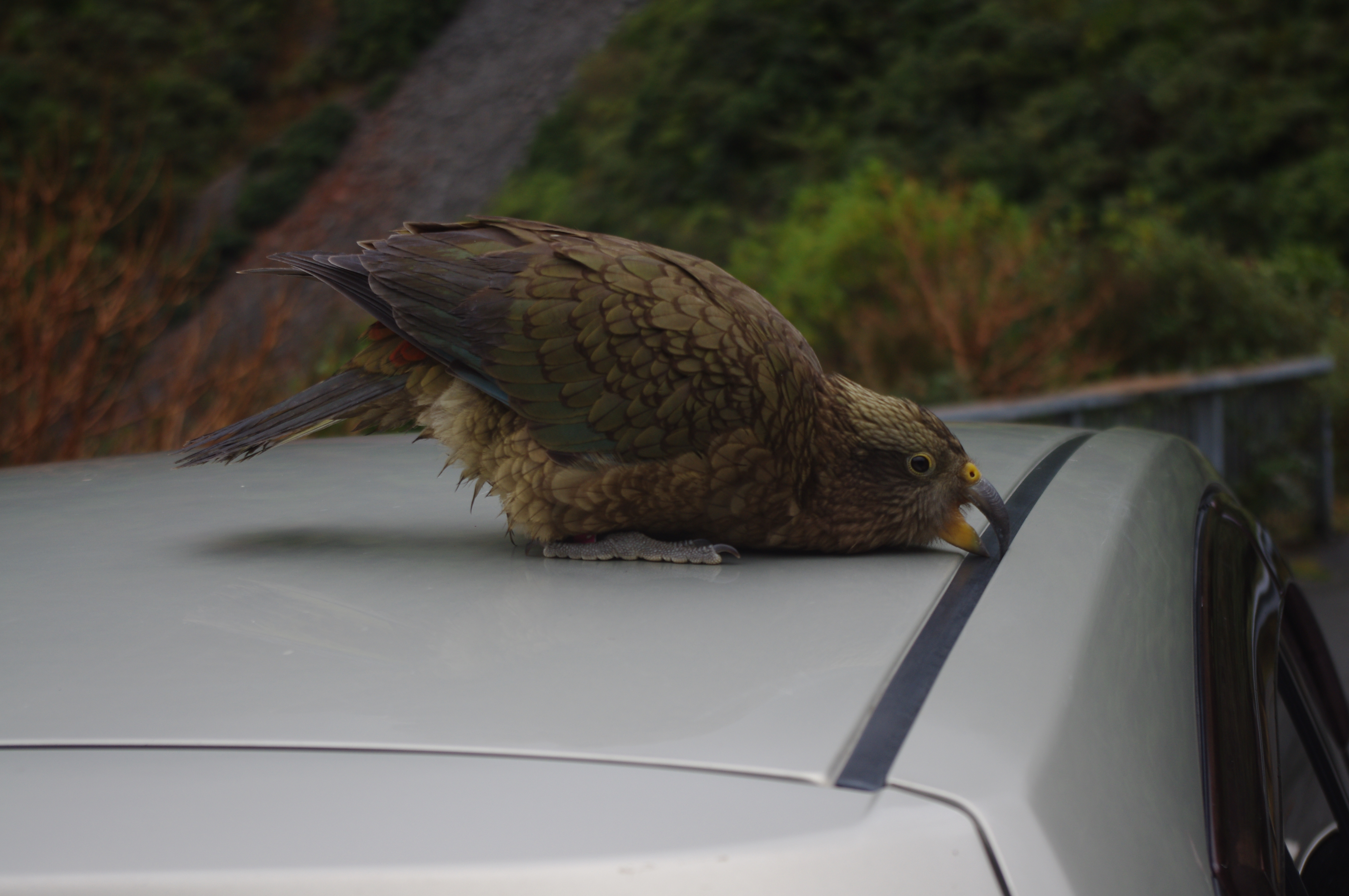
Kea tampering with a van

The environmental impact of litter on land also poses a significant danger to wildlife. The disposal of organic waste like banana peels or sandwich crusts is also a form of littering which threatens native birds. The Department of Conservation states that birds like the kea, a nationally endangered parrot, are known to be curious and playful creatures. Keas are likely to forage for food in areas occupied by humans. In these areas, they are made vulnerable to consuming human food scraps. The Department of Conservation has advised that human food products are unhealthy for a kea's digestive system and temporarily decrease their appetite. As a consequence, keas can become destructive with surrounding human belongings. To protect New Zealand's environment and the native species that inhabit it, visitors to conservation land are required to take their rubbish with them until they can dispose of it responsibly in an appropriate bin.

== Legislation ==
=== The Litter Act 1979 ===
The New Zealand Coat of Arms

The Litter Act 1979 is administered by the Ministry for the Environment. The Act defines littering as intentionally or unintentionally depositing of litter. It defines litter as including "any refuse, rubbish, animal remains, glass, metal, garbage, debris, dirt, filth, rubble, ballast, stones, earth, or waste matter, or any other thing of a like nature." The Act established Keep New Zealand Beautiful as the organisation responsible for the promotion of litter control in New Zealand.

==== Litter Control Officers ====
Section 5 of the Litter Act permits public authorities to appoint Litter Control Officers. Moreover, Section 6 of the Act states that anyone appointed to a particular public office is also conferred the powers and duties of a Litter Control Officer. Such persons include constables, traffic officers, harbourmasters, and national park rangers. Section 7 of the Act states that every appointed Litter Control Officer is authorised to enforce the provisions of the Act. It is within an Officer's powers and duties to intervene in the deposition or attempted deposition of litter in a public place or a private land. They are further authorised to intervene if they witness the deliberate damage or attempted deliberate damage of any litter receptacle in a public place. To support these provisions, a revised version of section 7 additionally references the Offences Act 1981.

==== Litter Wardens ====
In a similar category as the Litter Control Officers, every public authority has the right to appoint a temporary Litter Warden. Section 8 of the Litter Act states that, unless the conditions of his appointment state otherwise, the Litter Warden is authorised to exercise the same duties as the Litter Control Officers. Within the parameters of their given district, the Litter Warden is conferred the same powers and duties as the Officer. However, unlike Litter Control Officers, Litter Wardens are not permitted to legally intervene if an offence is being committed. This means that they are unable to issue infringement notices.

==== Public bins ====
Section 9 of the Litter Act states that every person, public authority, and department of State is required to provide and be responsible for the maintenance of bins in public places. Maintenance refers to the regularly emptying of the bin's contents and efficient disposal of those contents. Wherever rubbish is generated and likely to be littered, a reasonable distribution of well-constructed and suitable bins is necessary. The provision of litter receptacles is a mandatory means of enforcing litter control. If a noticeable amount of litter in public areas originates from any particular land or premises, section 9 of the Litter Act states that intervention of the public authority is necessary. To control litter, the public authority must require the occupier of the land or premises to provide and maintain the number of bins necessary for the disposal of litter. If an occupier fails to comply with this request, the public authority may install bins and recover costs from the occupier.

==== Grants and bylaws ====
Under Section 11 of the Litter Act, local or public authorities are permitted to make grants for the purpose of litter prevention or abatement. Section 11 provides that any local or public authority can make grants to any non-for-profit organisation for the prevention or abatement of litter. Such authorities are permitted to provide monetary support to any anti-litter campaign or scheme.

Section 12 of the Litter Act allows public authorities to make bylaws. It states that a public authority, whether it is acting independently or in collaboration with other public authorities, is permitted to occasionally make bylaws. These bylaws must be in accordance with the Litter Act and function with the purpose of litter control and prevention.

=== The Litter Amendment Act 2006 ===
The Litter Amendment Act 2006 made changes to the principal Act, including significant increases to maximum fines. Section 15 of the 1979 Litter Act addresses the deposition of litter in public or on private land. The expense of fines within section 15 were revised. Subsection 2 states that litter disposed in a dangerous manner or in a manner likely to cause harm is an offence warranting a fine not exceeding $7,500 and for a body corporate, this fine is not exceeding $30,000. Before this emendation was made, subsection 2 read $750 instead of $7,500 and $30,000 was originally $5,000. These changes were inserted in the Litter Act 1979 on 28 June 2006.

The Amendment Act also removed the defence of “reasonable excuse” and instituted strict liability, meaning that the prosecution does not need to prove that the defendant intentionally committed an offence under the Act.

== Litter behaviour research ==
In 2018, Keep New Zealand Beautiful published a National Litter Behaviour Research report. The study details both intentional and unintentional litter disposal observations of people in public places. It was conducted in late 2017 by an Auckland-based consultancy firm called Sunshine Yates Consulting. The behavioural litter patterns documented in the report indicate the prevalence of rubbish pollution within New Zealand's most populous regions.

=== Objective ===
The objective of the Litter Behaviour research project was to measure and evaluate litter behaviour through fieldwork undertaken across New Zealand. The project was undertaken by Sunshine Yates Consulting, with the purpose of informing litter abatement strategies and developing a precedent for future litter prevention activities. By conducting self-reports and through the collection of observational data, the report also aimed to establish a Disposal Behaviour Index (DBI) for each major region in the country.

=== Method ===
Fieldwork was covered throughout the North Island and South Island of New Zealand. Research was primarily conducted in the Greater Auckland region, Wellington region and the Canterbury region. The study used a multi-method approach. It involved both an observational approach to disposal behaviour and surveys with members of the public. The Observational Approach (OA) is a method used to record details of disposal behaviour as it happens. According to the research report, the aim of OA was to “provide a systematic and direct method of measuring behaviour in the actual context in which it occurs.”

The research was conducted by Keep New Zealand Beautiful volunteers. All the volunteers were trained in ethnographic data gathering techniques. After observing an act of disposal, observers directed an interviewer to conduct a self-report. Fieldwork commenced on 23 November and finished on 13 December 2017. Observations were made during daylight hours only between 7am and 6pm. Speciality sites included beaches, these were not available in every region. Core sites included:

- Parks
- Markets
- Waterfronts
- Public buildings
- Shopping streets
- Public squares

=== Key findings ===
According to the executive summary of the National Litter Behaviour Research document, New Zealand has a litter rate of 16%. This means that the observational study of littering in public areas showed that 84% did not litter and disposed of their items responsibly. Results revealed that the National Deposit Behaviour Index score of New Zealand is 6 and therefore high. The Deposit Behaviour Index operates on a scale from 1 to 7. The score 1 equals a low level of responsible rubbish disposable and indicates a high prevalence of littering. The score 7 indicates minimal littering and a high prevalence of people disposing of their rubbish in bins. The report revealed that the Regional Disposal Behaviour Index score in Wellington is 7 and in Auckland and Canterbury it is 6.

Observational data revealed that the most littered items were cigarette butts. Nationally, 78% of litter acts were of cigarette butts. Instances of cigarette butt disposal observed during the project recorded 57% of cigarette butts littered while 43% were disposed of in bins.

National surveys revealed that 75% of respondents considered it extremely important that people do not litter in the area where they were interviewed. A further 18% of respondents considered it very important. The remaining 7% of respondents considered it moderately or slightly important. Nationally, 99% of respondents considered the maintenance of New Zealand's 'clean green' image to be of importance.

=== Demographic ===
The age and gender of people who were observed littering and subsequently agreed to be interviewed varied. The observational data collected in the Litter Behaviour Study revealed that 53% of people littering were male. In addition, people aged between 25 and 34 made up a quarter of the overall people observed littering.

The survey data further revealed that 66% of the people who self-reported having littered were either in full or part-time employment. In addition, the study concluded that the likelihood of a person littering did not appear dependent on their level of education.

== National Litter Audit 2019 ==
The National Litter Audit 2019 was undertaken by Keep New Zealand Beautiful, using a methodology developed in conjunction with Statistics New Zealand, the Department of Conservation and the Ministry for the Environment. It was supported by the Waste Minimisation Fund which is administered by the Ministry for the Environment. The Audit has been referred to as "the most comprehensive litter audit of its scale carried out in New Zealand."

=== Sites ===
National Litter Audit 2019 – top categories by weight per 1,000 m^{2}

The audit revealed that 80% of the litter found in the country's waterways originated from the land. For this reason, the audit is primarily concerned with land-based litter. The main site types inspected in the audit were residential, retail and industrial areas as well as carparks, highways, railways and public recreational areas. These types of sites were surveyed within the local territorial authority regions of Auckland, Gisborne, Nelson, Tasman and Marlborough.

The highest numbers of littered items discovered per 1,000 m^{2} were within industrial sites. This was followed by retail and highway sites.

The highest volume of litter objects recorded per 1,000 m^{2} were found at highway sites, railway sites and industrial sites.

Railway sites, highway sites and industrial sites also accounted for the highest weights per 1,000 m^{2}.

Litter recorded per 1,000 m^{2}
site type	numbers	volume	weight
Industrial	256 items	13.66 L	1.27 kg
Retail	241 items	7.61 L	0.48 kg
Highways	195 items	43.67 L	2.29 kg
Railways	138 items	25.21 L	3.24 kg
Carparks	108 items	4.70 L	0.37 kg
Residential	103 items	7.66 L	0.67 kg
Recreational	20 items	1.02 L	0.08 kg

=== Litter materials ===
National Litter Audit 2019 – top 12 categories by items per 1,000 m^{2}

The main categories of litter materials identified in the audit included cigarette butts, paper and cardboard, metal, glass, plastic and organic waste. The most frequently found item nationally was cigarette butts. 39 butts were recorded per 1,000 m^{2}. Disposable nappies, which were included in "miscellaneous" items, made up the largest contribution to the estimated national litter volumes, recording 1.50 litres of volume per 1,000 m^{2}. Glass beer bottles made up the largest contribution to the national litter weights, recording 0.12 kg of weight per 1,000 m^{2}.

Litter recorded per 1,000 m^{2}
Material type	numbers	volume	weight
Cigarette butts	39 items	0.0003 L	0.012 kg
Plastic	29 items	1.16 L	0.11 kg
Paper/Cardboard	15 items	1.66 L	0.06 kg
Metal	14 items	0.93 L	0.10 kg
Glass	12 items	0.64 L	0.23 kg
Miscellaneous	7 items	1.59 L	0.07 kg
Organic waste	1 item	0.04 L	0.03 kg
Illegal dumping	<1 item	1.31 L	not recorded

== Cigarette butt litter ==
Littered cigarette butt at Hamilton, New Zealand

While the smoking rate in New Zealand is low, cigarette butts are the most littered item in the country. A 2018 study conducted by the Keep New Zealand Beautiful council recorded that cigarette butts made up 78% of all items littered nationally. For these reasons, the littering of cigarette butts is recognised as a pervasive issue in New Zealand. While the littering of cigarette butts is considerable in New Zealand, it is also of international concern. According to the Tobacco-Free Life campaign, the littering of cigarette butts is a global issue with an estimated 4,5 trillion butts littered internationally every year. In addition, research conducted by the Royal Society of New Zealand has revealed that cigarette butts are amongst the most common plastic items collected in international beach clean-ups.

=== Littering behaviour ===
The National Litter Behaviour study conducted by Keep New Zealand Beautiful in 2018, revealed the littering of cigarette butts to be prevalent throughout New Zealand. The study observed that 59% of cigarette butts disposed of in Auckland were littered. In Canterbury 71% of cigarette butts observed being disposed of were littered and Wellington the percentage of cigarette butts observed being littered was 39%. The rate of littering cigarette butts is believed to be high because people do not generally view cigarette butts as a valid form of litter or they believe it to be harmless. In a survey conducted by Keep New Zealand Beautiful 42% of respondents who were observed littering cigarette butts claimed they had never littered. In addition, the study found that the smokers did not believe their littering of cigarette butts to be a real form of litter or that they believed them to be biodegradable.

A study conducted in urban Wellington in 2011 found that smokers littering cigarette butts was conventional behaviour, even when rubbish bins were nearby. Littering of cigarette butts was more common in the evening, where 85.8% of smokers were observed littering, compared with the afternoon, when 68.1% were observed littering. In addition, 73.5% of smokers did not extinguish their butts, making them fire hazards.

=== Environmental impact ===
The toxic chemicals within cigarettes raise environmental concerns. Cigarette butts primarily consist of plastic. They are made up of cellulose acetate which contains numerous chemicals. While cigarette butts can take up to 10 years to completely decompose, the chemicals they release last longer in the environment. The leachate chemicals in littered cigarettes butts have also been shown to pose acute or chronic ecological harm to marine life.

=== Behavioural interventions ===
To address the issue of cigarette butt littering, New Zealand's Office of the Prime Minister's Chief Science Advisor has cited research which states that:

"There is a need to change perceptions about cigarette butts as harmless litter."

A series of behavioural strategies have been suggested by the office of the prime minister's chief science advisor to reduce cigarette butt litter. The strategies involve:

1. creating a suitable environment for the correct disposal of cigarette butts with signage on pathways directing smokers to the nearest bin.
2. fostering a feeling of pride and ownership in smokers to maintain a clean environment and thereby encourage a commitment to dispose of their cigarette butts in a bin
3. implementing positive social norming so that the binning of cigarette butts becomes standard practice.
4. warning smokers of the consequences of littering. This means raising awareness about fines, implementing enforcement officers to monitor and speak to smokers and thereby increase recognition of cigarette butts as a form of litter.

These strategies were trialled by Australia's NSW Environment Protection Authority (EPA) across 40 smoking sights. All the strategies led to an increased rate of binning cigarette butts. Fostering a feeling of pride and ownership was the most effective strategy but creating signage on pathways was considered the simplest and most cost-effective intervention.

In 2019, New Zealand launched a No Butts campaign. The purpose of the campaign is to emphasise the negative impact of littering cigarette butts and to promote the correct disposal of butts.

== Response ==
=== Fines ===
Under the Offences and Penalties section of the Litter Act 1979, anyone who deposits litter in or on a public place or on private land without the occupier's consent can be fined. The fines for rubbish dumping and littering in Auckland and Wellington range from NZ$100 to NZ$400.

The dumping of rubbish on public conservation land in New Zealand warrants a fine of up to $100,000 or up to two years' imprisonment. The Department of Conservation also has the authority to issue infringement notices for minor cases of littering. Penalties for littering on public conservation land result in a $300 infringement fee.

Restrictions to freedom camping in New Zealand were introduced to Parliament in 2011 with the Freedom Camping Bill. The bill passes a $200 instant fine for Illegal camping and another fine of up to $10,000 for the illegal emptying of a campervans sewage.

=== Cigarette butt littering ===
Policy measures in New Zealand aim to reduce the littering of cigarette butts. The littering of cigarette butts is the most prevalent form of rubbish pollution in NZ. Due to the prevalence of littered cigarette butts, a conflict has existed over the fines it should warrant. In 2017, Wellington City Council discussed whether the littering of cigarette butts should be subject to more expensive fines than other forms of litter. In 2018, a consultation addressed the creation of a specific bylaw. This bylaw would present the littering of cigarette butts as an offence. The consultation process revealed that 85% of responses were in favour of the bylaw and 14% were in opposition. The introduction of the bylaw was criticised by some members of the council because they believed it was impossible to enforce.

In May 2018, the Wellington City Council Strategy Committee voted to repeal the clause. Councillor Brian Dawson claimed that the most effective way to reduce cigarette butt litter was to reduce the number of people smoking. In 2019, Wellington City Council launched the Smokefree Wellington Action Plan in support of the government's Smokefree Aotearoa 2025 campaign. This government plan was established in 2011 which, amongst health incentives, plans on preventing and ultimately ending cigarette butt litter nationally.

=== Public rubbish bins ===
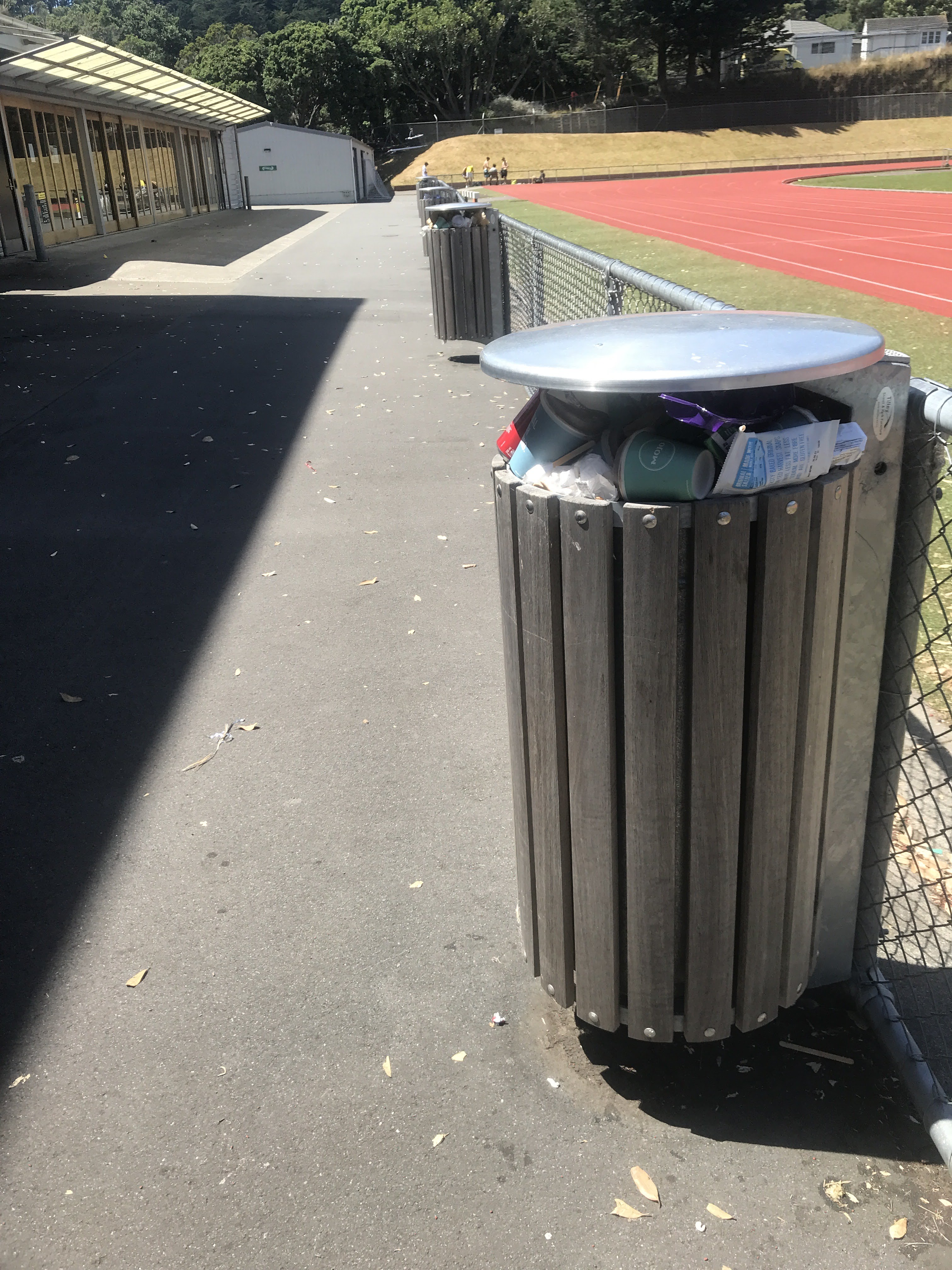
Overflowing rubbish bin at sports stadium

According to the Keep New Zealand Beautiful Litter Behaviour Study, bin use was recorded to be at a nationally high rate. Cigarettes were the only item observed to be littered more than binned. In addition, a litter behaviour survey revealed that 33% of respondents thought the best way to prevent littering would be to provide more bins. In 2020, Christchurch city council launched "smart bins". The smart bins replaced traditional rubbish bins in 2021. They were designed to prevent the overflow of rubbish. With a secure design and sensor technology, the smart bins would be able detect the amount of rubbish being disposed and therefore be emptied by council staff before they overflowed. In November 2021, the Banks Peninsula settlement of Akaroa reported overflowing bins and an increase in littering due to jammed bins, lack of staff and not enough smart bins to replace traditional bins.

Another approach to litter abatement in New Zealand has been the removal of bins. In 2019, the city of Whangārei removed bins from three of its beaches. The primary incentive behind removing the bins was to avoid illegal dumping. Since removing the bins, the Whangārei District Council has reported a reduction in the amount of litter found on the beaches.

=== Reducing the impact of plastic ===
The New Zealand Ministry for the Environment has stated that single-use plastics items are more likely to be littered than other items. This is because they are considered inexpensive, ubiquitous, and not designed for reuse.

With the aim of reducing plastic and its impact on the environment, the Office of the Prime Minister's Chief Science Advisor released a Rethinking Plastics in Aotearoa New Zealand Report in 2019. In 2020, the New Zealand Government agreed to further investigate the environmental impact of plastic and develop a national plastics action plan. The aim of the National Plastics Action Plan is to help New Zealand develop into a low-waste economy. As of 2021, the Action Plan sets out a new system of plastic production and use for the future of New Zealand. This new system is designed to be sustainable, beneficial to society and help New Zealand eventually achieve a low-carbon circular economy. In order to achieve these objectives, the action plan aims to minimise plastic use to a sustainable level through behavioral reform. To achieve a circular economy, it also aims to put better systems in place for the efficient reuse, repairing and recycling of plastic materials. Overall, the National Plastics Action Plan has invested approximately $100 million in resource recovery infrastructure.

==== Plastic bag ban ====
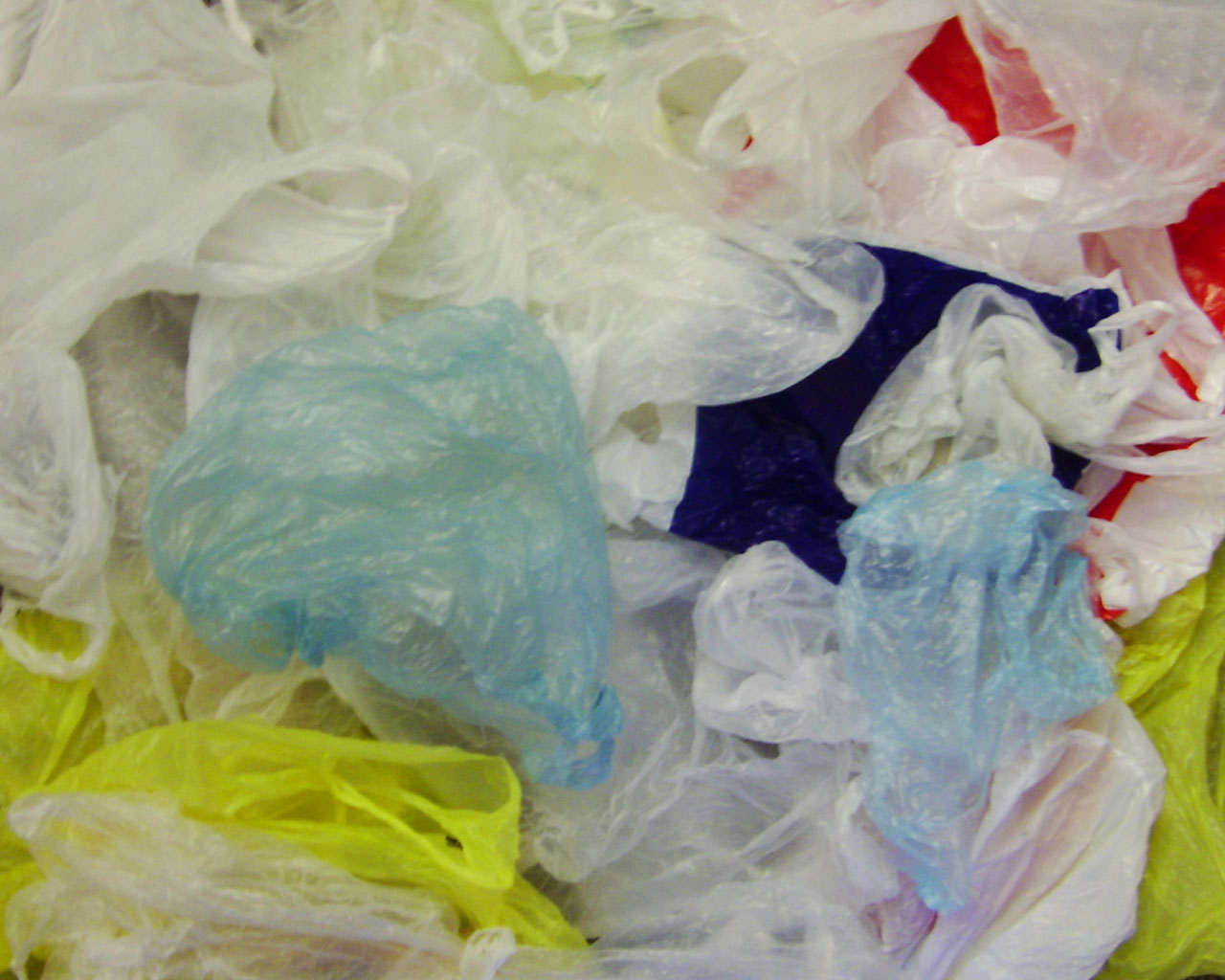
Single-use plastic shopping bags

To reduce plastic pollution, the New Zealand government banned single-use plastic bags on 1 July 2019. The "mandatory phase out" of all single-use plastic bags was first introduced by the Ministry for the Environment in 2018. The plastic bag ban means that no businesses in New Zealand can sell, distribute or in any way provide customers with single-use plastic shopping bags. These were substituted by reusable shopping bags made of nylon, polypropylene, or polyester.

Starting from 1st July 2023, the ban on the sale of plastic produce bags was implemented as part of the plan to phase out most single-use plastics. Since the ban, plastic produce bags are commonly substituted with paper-based versions.

=== Anti-litter campaigns ===
==== Keep New Zealand Beautiful ====
Keep New Zealand Beautiful
- Founded at: Botany, Auckland
- Type: Non-profit organisation
- Registration no.: 218445
- Legal status: Incorporated Society
- Purpose: Litter abatement
- Website: www.knzb.org.nz
- Formerly called: New Zealand Litter Control Council

The most recognised anti-litter organisation in New Zealand is Keep New Zealand Beautiful, originally established by government in 1967 as the Anti-Litter Council. With the passing of the Litter Act in 1979, the council became an Incorporated Society under the name New Zealand Litter Control Council, and was officially recognised in the Act as the primary body responsible for promotion of litter control in New Zealand. In 1984, the organisation adopted a more community-based approach to the problem of littering and changed its name to the Keep New Zealand Beautiful Society Inc. Since its foundation in 1967, Keep New Zealand Beautiful has created nationally recognised educational campaigns to promote litter abatement. Anti-litter campaigns additionally address further issues like climate action, reducing environmental pollution and protecting biodiversity.

Popular campaigns launched by Keep New Zealand Beautiful include ‘Be a Tidy Kiwi’ and ‘Do the Right Thing.’ Other programmes include:

- Kiki Kiwi & Friends Litter Less Programme
- Young reporters Litter Less Programme
- Clean up Week
- Community clean ups
- Tidy Kiwi Volunteer of the Month
- Beautiful Awards

==== The National Litter Hub ====
The National Litter Hub is a resource launched by Keep New Zealand Beautiful. It allows people in New Zealand to access information regarding litter disposal and recycling policies around the country. This resource was created in response to survey results which were recorded in the National Litter Behaviour Study in 2018.

==== The Litter Intelligence Programme ====
The Litter Intelligence Programme is an educational initiative developed by the New Zealand-based charity Sustainable Coastlines. The programme was launched in May 2018 and is funded by the Waste Minimisation Fund which is administered by the New Zealand Ministry for the Environment. The Programme focuses on beach litter and functions as both a citizen science project and a school education programme. On a local level the programme addresses the issue of litter through behavioural reform. It aims to encourage schools and citizens to address and measure the environmental impact of litter. On a national level, it aims to create a national litter database. The Litter Intelligence Programme uses a localised version of the monitoring methodology established by the United Nations Environment Programme.

According to Camden Howitt, co-founder and Coastlines Lead at Sustainable Coastlines:

“robust environmental monitoring programmes are few and far between, and where they do exist, communities are seldom engaged with the monitoring work and data that inform the decisions that shape their communities.”

== See also ==
- Environment of New Zealand
- Pollution in New Zealand
- Smoking in New Zealand
- Waste in New Zealand
