= Food waste in New Zealand =

Wastage of food in New Zealand

Food waste in New Zealand is one of the many environmental issues that is being addressed by industry, individuals, organisations and government.

More that 1.2 million tonnes of food is wasted in New Zealand every year. This amounts to an average of 237 kilograms of waste per person. Two thirds of waste is from the food processing and production sectors, with the remaining third from households. Research continues to be done into household food waste, retail food waste, and food waste in the hospitality sector, including by the Ministry of the Environment.

== Household food waste ==
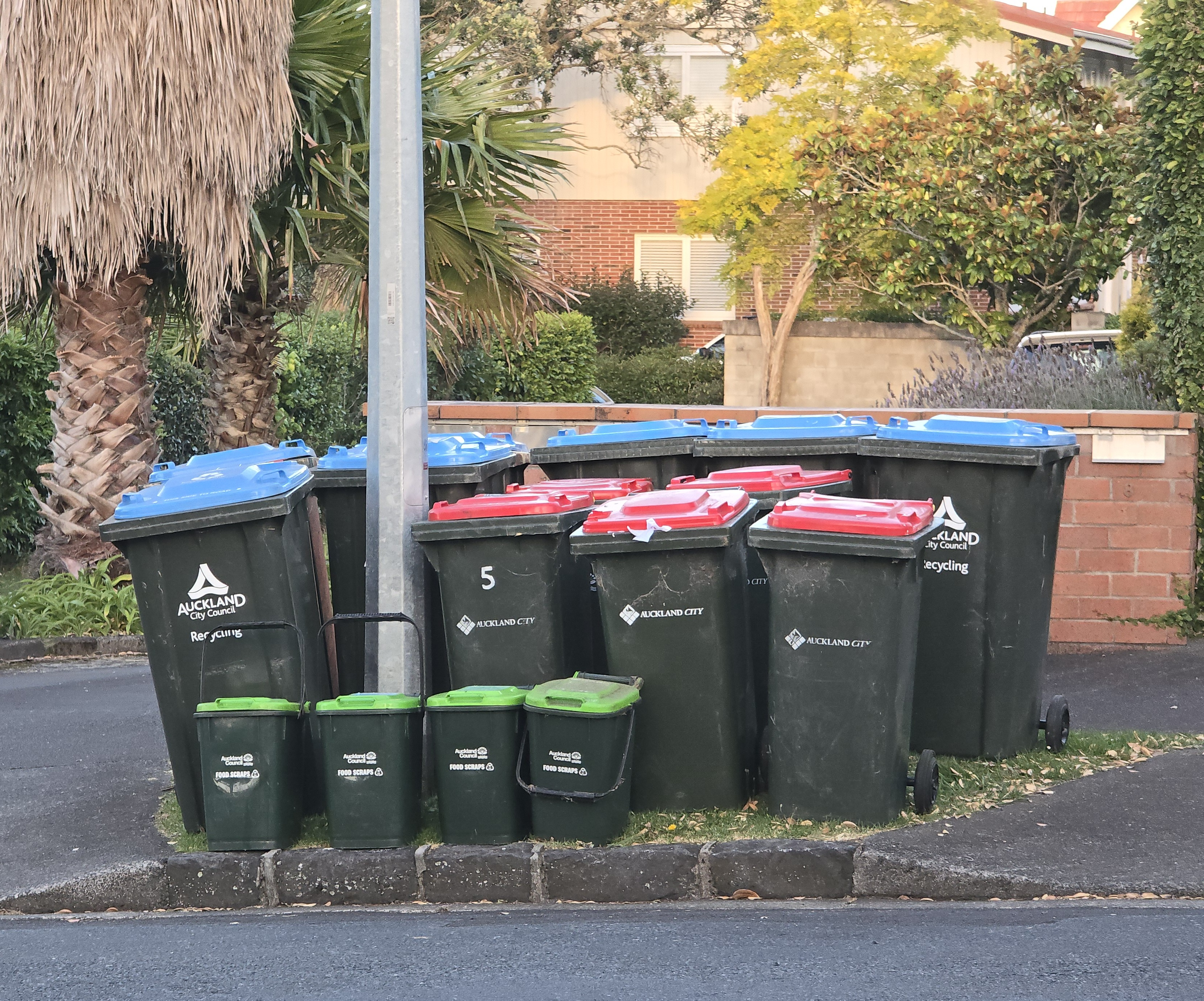
Small green-topped rubbish bins containing household food waste placed kerbside for collection in central Auckland, alongside recycling and landfill rubbish bins.

A Waste Not Consulting report to the Ministry for the Environment, "Household Waste Data 2008", calculated that, in 2008, 1,048,993 tonnes of waste were generated by the residential sector, an average of 260 kg per person or 676 kg per household per annum. Over 44% of this household waste was organic, with 24.7% (or 258,886 tonnes) of the total being kitchen waste, and 19.6% being greenwaste (205,526 tonnes).

More detailed research into food waste generated by households, that was disposed of through curbside rubbish collections, was conducted by Waste Not Consulting in 2014 on behalf of WasteMINZ. The rubbish bins of 1,402 households were studied with their food waste sorted, weighed and costed. The study found that 229,022 tonnes of food is sent to landfill by households annually. Of this approximately 50% or 122,547 tonnes is avoidable food waste. The national cost of avoidable household food waste disposed of to landfill in 2014/2015 was $872 million pa. Eliminating this food waste would have the same effect as reducing CO_{2} equivalent greenhouse gas emissions by 325,975 tonnes – equivalent to planting 130,390 trees or taking 118,107 cars off the road for a year.

Research done by Massey University academics in 2015 found that certain households created more food waste. These were households with more young people and households with larger numbers.

This research was repeated in 2018 with the rubbish bins of 600 households audited. The study found that on average, New Zealand households were throwing away 3.15 kg of food a week via their domestic kerbside collection. This is down from 3.17 kg of food waste from bin audits conducted in 2014-2015 by Waste Not Consulting. Due primarily to population growth over that time period 157,398 tonnes of avoidable food waste is being landfilled each year.

The average New Zealand household in 2018 wasted $644 worth of food pa approximately 86 kilos.

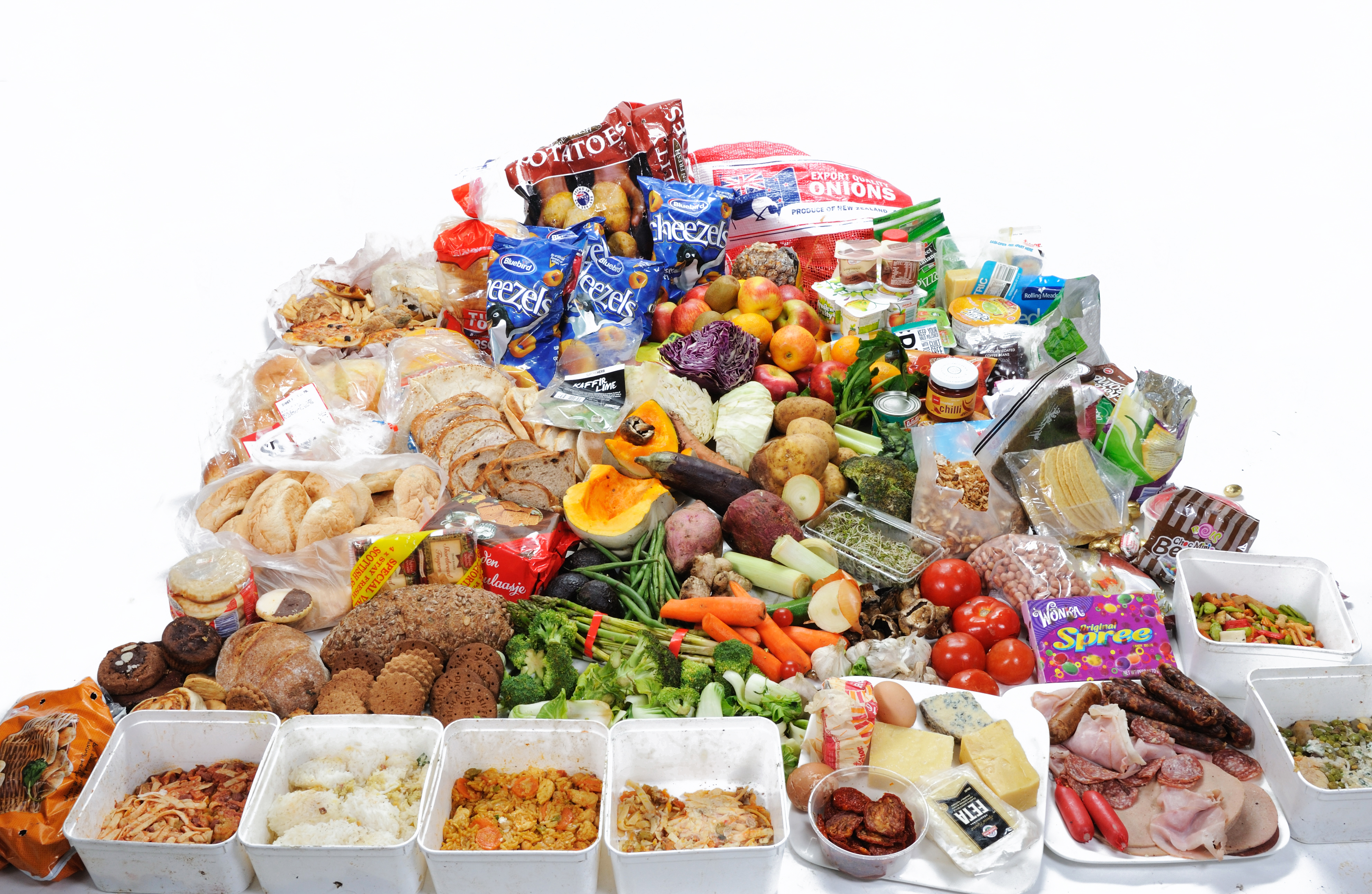
42.4 kg of avoidable food waste found in New Zealand household rubbish bins in 2014

The top ten foods wasted in 2018 were:

1. Bread 10%
2. Left overs 8%
3. Oranges and Mandarins 4%
4. Apples 3%
5. Bananas 3%
6. Potatoes 3%
7. Poultry 3%
8. Rice 3%
9. Lettuces 2%
10. Beef 2%.

Statistics on exactly how much edible food is wasted by households and composted, fed to animals or disposed of through a kitchen waste disposal unit are not known. A 2014 survey of 1,365 households found that 66% of those surveyed disposed of some of their food through the council kerbside collection, with 47% disposing of some of their food through composting, 35% through feeding animals and 28% through a kitchen disposal unit. The Love Food Hate Waste Campaign launched in New Zealand on 1 June 2016. The campaign supports families to waste less food by encouraging behaviours to reduce food waste such as using leftovers and correct storage of food. An evaluation of the campaign conducted in 2018 found that households who had heard of the campaign have decreased their food waste to landfill by 27.1%.

Perceptions of food waste

In 2014 a survey of 1,354 households was undertaken by WasteMINZ and people were asked how much food they thought they wasted and how much their weekly shopping bill was. People thought they bought $140 worth of food per week in their grocery shop and they estimated they wasted 5%. So the total amount they thought they wasted was $390 per household per year which equates to $600 million per year

A study was undertaken in 2017 by Rabobank with similar questions asked. People thought they bought $180 worth of food per week in their grocery shop and they estimated they wasted 12%. So the total amount they thought they wasted was $1,071 per household which equates to $1.8 billion per year. It is unclear whether this increased perception of the amount wasted correlates to an actual increase in the amount wasted.

The survey conducted by WasteMINZ in 2014 was repeated using the same survey methodology. People thought they bought $150 worth of food per week in their grocery shop a $10 increase and they estimated they wasted 5% no change with 2014. This suggests that the increased estimate of food waste by Rabobank is due to a difference in survey methodology rather than an actual increase.

== Supermarket food waste ==
Research has been conducted into supermarket food waste in New Zealand by the University of Otago. Physical waste audits were conducted at New World, Countdown and PAK'nSAVE supermarkets around New Zealand in 2017. In total it is estimated that 60,500 tonnes of food are wasted per annum by supermarkets in New Zealand. This equates to approximately 160 tonnes per store per annum. 15% of supermarket food waste is donated to food rescue groups and only 23% is sent to landfill with the balance sent to animal feed 46% or protein reprocessing 15%.

The most wasted foods are

1. Vegetables 27%
2. Bakery 23%
3. Meat and Fish 19%
4. Fruit 17%

In New Zealand it is permitted to send food waste to pig farmers; however the Biosecurity (Meat and Food Waste for Pigs) Regulations 2005, passed under the Biosecurity Act 1993, prohibits feeding pigs with uncooked meat or food that has been in contact with uncooked meat. In Auckland Ecostock Supplies collects and recycles food waste from manufacturers, retailers, importers and transport companies to make high-quality stock feed.

Supermarkets do not sell foods that are past their use by date or best before dates, for legal reasons and because of the perceived danger to health. Many supermarkets have partnered with food banks around the country and now donate tinned and packaged food which has passed its best before date, but it still safe to eat.

== Hospitality food waste ==
The Environment Select Committee held a briefing into food waste in 2018. Research conducted into hospitality food waste by the University of Otago and WasteMINZ in 2018 found that cafes and restaurants create 24,366 tonnes of food waste each year, of which 61% is avoidable. It is not known what percentage is sent to landfill as some businesses divert their food waste to composting facilities, food rescue collections or animals.

For this research, food waste was divided into three categories: spoilage, preparation waste and plate waste.

- Spoilage occurs with the over-purchasing of ingredients or poor stock rotation, which causes food to spoil and be discarded before it is even used.
- Preparation waste occurs in the kitchen and includes things like vegetable peelings, eggshells or toast that gets burnt. It also includes any unsold food that is left at the end of the day.
- Plate waste is whatever customers leave behind on their plate uneaten.

Spoilage was found to be 7% of all food waste; preparation waste was 60% and plate waste was 33%.

For cafés and restaurants, which offer prepared food such as scones, sandwiches, pies etc.; 30% of the preparation waste was unsold food.

By category, the food wasted the most in the sector is:

1. Vegetables 28%
2. Bakery 26%
3. Meat 13%
4. Fruit 9%

== Reuse of food waste ==
In 2019 there were 15 food rescue groups operating around the country.

Food rescue groups include KiwiHarvest in Auckland and Dunedin, Kaibosh in Wellington, and Kaivolution in Hamilton. This is then distributed to local food banks and social agencies. In 2017 2,777 tonnes of food was rescued. In Wellington the Kai to Compost scheme addresses commercial food waste in the city. It was initially a trial scheme with government funding became a user pays scheme involving 50 businesses.

Dumpster diving, especially at supermarkets, does still occur to a limited gather discarded food.

== See also ==
- List of waste types
- Agriculture in New Zealand
