= Pollution in New Zealand =

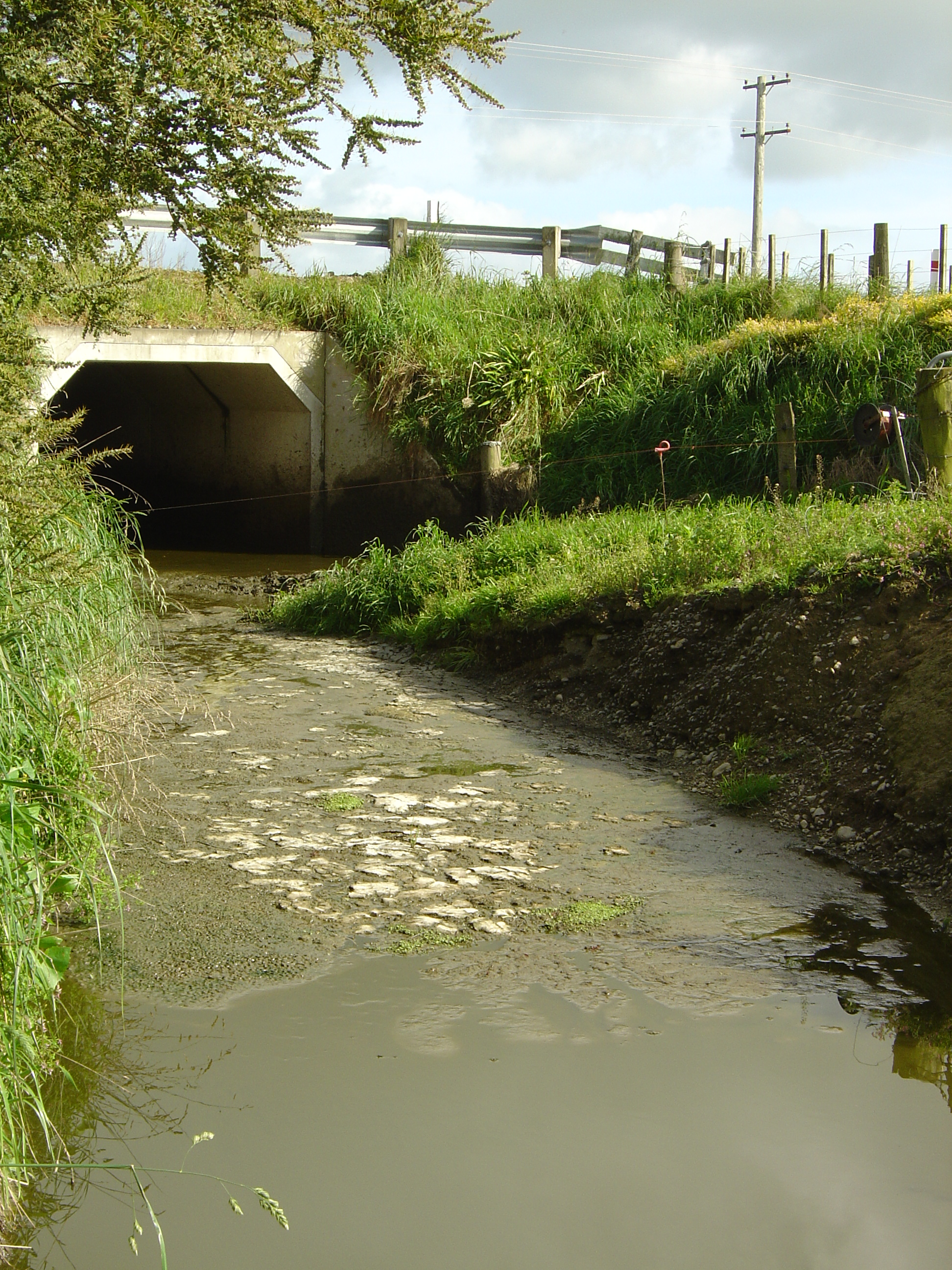
Water pollution due to dairy farming in the Wairarapa

Pollution is an environmental issue in New Zealand with a number of measures being taken to reduce its severity. New Zealand is sometimes viewed as being "clean and green" but this can be refuted due to pollution levels, among other factors. New Zealand does have a relatively low air pollution level, but some areas have high levels of plastic pollution.

== Types ==
=== Water pollution ===
Water pollution in New Zealand varies depending on the level of development in the water catchment areas. In recent years concerns have been raised about the effect of intensification of dairy farming on water quality. The Drying and Clean Streams Accord was established to address problems with water pollution due to dairy farming.

=== Marine pollution ===
Fertiliser runs off farms and yards into nearby rivers and streams, which carry it out to the ocean. It is also carried by the cloud and when it rains it drops in the ocean, which is carried by the current.

=== Air pollution ===
Excess levels of fine particulate matter (PM_{2.5}) are a concern in several towns and cities across New Zealand, primarily due to the widespread use of woodburners for residential heating. This issue is exacerbated by local climatic conditions and topographical features that contribute to temperature inversions, trapping pollutants near the ground.

New Zealand has a relatively unique greenhouse gas emissions profile. In 2007, agriculture contributed 48.2% of total emissions, energy (including transport); 43.2%, industry; 6.1%, waste; 2.4%. In other Kyoto Protocol Annex 1 countries, agriculture typically contributes about 11% of total emissions. From 1990 to 2007, total greenhouse gas emissions in New Zealand increased by 22.1%. Emission increases by sector were - agriculture; 12.1%, energy; 39.2%, industry; 35.0%. Only the small waste sector reduced emissions, by 25.3%.

== Legislation ==
- Clean Air Act 1972
- Resource Management Act 1991

== Notable occurrences ==
- Contaminated site at Mapua
- Tui mine tailings dam

== See also ==
- Environment of New Zealand
- Pesticides in New Zealand
- Litter in New Zealand
