= Kathleen Gallagher (New Zealand writer) =

New Zealand poet, playwright, filmmaker and novelist

Kathleen Gallagher (born 1957) is a playwright, filmmaker, poet, and novelist from New Zealand.

== Early life ==
Gallagher was born in Christchurch, New Zealand.

== Career ==
She started writing at age 18 and was writing plays for theatre by 1984. Gallagher has written and produced at least 15 plays, working with the Blue Ladder Theatre Group and the Women's Action Theatre Her plays have been performed on stage and on radio, in New Zealand and in Australia. She has also published three collections. Another New Zealand poet, Dame Fiona Kidman, described her work saying "the presentation of these poem is exquisite, the work itself is interesting and image laden, often delicate in style."

Gallagher is an advocate for peace, and has directed multiple documentaries on the environment, spirituality, and the peace movement. These include the documentary Peaceful Pacific, and the documentary Tau Te Mauri – Breath of Peace, which describes New Zealand's peace movement towards becoming nuclear-free. The film Seven Rivers Walking – Haere Mārire, which she co-directed with Galyene Barns, premiered at the 2017 NZ International Film Festival.

Gallagher has an ATCL in drama from Trinity College, Dublin, Ireland, a BA in history and religious studies from the University of Canterbury, and a Postgraduate Diploma in accounting from Victoria University of Wellington. She has worked as an accountant and has lectured accounting and taxation at the University of Auckland and Nelson Polytechnic.

== Awards ==
New Zealand Playwrights Award 1993 – winner

New Zealand Radio Awards 1996 – finalist for Charlie Bloom

New Zealand Media Peace Awards 1996 – finalist for Charlie Bloom

Sonja Davies Peace Award 2004 – winner for Tau Te Mauri – Breath of Peace

World Peace Film and Music Festival – commended for He Oranga, He Oranga

== Works ==
=== Film and television ===
Jimmy Sullivan (2000) as director and writer

Tau Te Mauri – Breath of Peace (2004) as director and writer

Peaceful Pacific (2004) as director

He Oranga, He Oranga (2007) as director, writer and producer

Barefoot Peacemakers (2008) as producer

Earth Whisperers Papatuanuku (2009) as director, writer and producer

Water Whisperers Tangaroa (2010) as director, writer and producer

Sky Whisperers Ranganui (2011) as director, writer and producer

Nancy Wake: The White Mouse (2014) as executive producer

Hautu (2016) as director

Seven Rivers Walking – Haere Mārire (2017) as co-director

=== Poetry collections ===
Tara (1987)

Gypsy (1993)

Twilight Burns the Sky (2001)

=== Plays and play collections ===
Mothertongue (1999), a collection of four plays: Mothertongue and Jacaranda (both written with Kate Winstanley), and Offspring and Banshee Reel (both written with Gen Rippingale)

Peace Plays (2002), a collection of three plays: Charlie Bloom, Hautu, and Shanty and the Angel. Charlie Bloom was first performed in 1996.

Earthquakes & Butterflies (2018), an adaptation of her 2015 novel

=== Novels ===
Earthquakes & Butterflies – Otautahi Christchurch (2015)

Īnangahua Gold (2018), with drawings by Michael Coughlan
