= Litter Act 1979 (New Zealand) =

Act of Parliament in New Zealand

New Zealand Parliament
- Long title: An Act to make better provision for the abatement and control of litter

Legislative history
- Passed: 1979
- Status: Current legislation

The Litter Act 1979 is an Act of the New Zealand Parliament. This Act is administered by the Ministry for the Environment.

== See also ==
- Litter in New Zealand

The Litter Act was established to make better provision for the abatement and control of litter. The Act is a basic mechanism for local government to prevent littering.

The functions of the Act include:

- establishing enforcement officers and litter wardens who may issue fines and abatement notices for litter offences
- allowing territorial authorities to force the removal of litter
- allowing public authorities to make by-laws pursuant to the provisions of the Act.

This Act is administered by the Ministry for the Environment.
