= Wellington Convention =

1989 multilateral treaty

Convention for the Prohibition of Fishing with Long Driftnets in the South Pacific
- Type: fishing; environmental
- Drafted: 24 November 1989
- Signed: 29 November 1989
- Location: Wellington, New Zealand
- Effective: 17 May 1991
- Condition: four ratifications
- Signatories: 15
- Parties: 13
- Depositary: Governments of the New Zealand
- Languages: English and French

The Wellington Convention (formally, the Convention for the Prohibition of Fishing with Long Driftnets in the South Pacific) is a 1989 multilateral treaty whereby states agreed to prohibit the use of fishing driftnets longer than 2.5 kilometres in the South Pacific. The Wellington Convention played a role in the 1991 United Nations General Assembly's resolution calling for a global moratorium of driftnet fishing on the high seas.

== Creation, signatures, and ratifications ==
The Convention was concluded at Wellington on 24 November 1989. It was opened for signature to states which have territory within the South Pacific. The Convention was signed by Australia, Cook Islands, Fiji, France, Kiribati, Marshall Islands, Federated States of Micronesia, New Zealand, Niue, Palau, Solomon Islands, Tuvalu, United States, and Vanuatu.

Of the states that signed the Convention, it has not been ratified by France, Marshall Islands, Tuvalu, and Vanuatu. Samoa, which did not sign the Convention, has acceded to it. Additionally, Papua New Guinea has notified New Zealand—the depositary state—that the prohibitions of the Convention had been taken into account when Papua New Guinea enacted its Fisheries Act 1994.

== Global moratorium of driftnet fishing ==
On 20 December 1991, the UN General Assembly passed the Resolution on Large-scale Pelagic Driftnet Fishing and its Impact on the Living Marine Resources of the World's Oceans and Seas. The resolution called for a worldwide moratorium on driftnet fishing and cited the entry into force of the Wellington Convention as contributing support to such a moratorium.

== Protocols ==
The Convention has two Protocols that supplement it. Both were concluded at Noumea, New Caledonia on 20 October 2000

Ratification of Protocol I allows states that do not have territory in the Convention Area to nevertheless agree that they will prohibit their nationals and their fishing vessels from using driftnets while fishing in the Convention Area. Protocol I has been ratified only by the United States; it entered into force for the U.S. on 28 February 1992.

Ratification of Protocol II allows states that do not have territory in the Convention Area but have territory in the waters that are contiguous to the Convention Area to nevertheless agree that they will prohibit their nationals and their fishing vessels from using driftnets while fishing in the Convention Area. Protocol II has been ratified by Chile (5 October 1993) and Canada (28 August 1998).
