= Mt William North Mining Project =

Coal mine in New Zealand

Coordinates: 41.689899°S 171.909242°E

Location of the proposed mine.

The Mt William North Mining Project is a proposed coal mine planned for the West Coast Region of New Zealand.

Solid Energy, the state-owned mining company, applied for resource consents in February 2012 to mine an area near the existing Stockton Mine. Preparation costs are expected to be $30-40 million to mine five million tonnes of coking coal.

The area covered by the resource consent is approximately 294 ha and is adjacent to the proposed Cypress Mine. It lies about 25 km to the north-east of Westport.

Forest and Bird, New Zealand's largest environmental organisation, say it will treat the resource consent application in a different manner to Bathhurst Resources proposed Escarpment Mine Project to the south. Forest and Bird, as well as other organisations, oppose the Escarpment Mine Project because of the high ecological value on the site of the proposed mine.

== See also ==
- Mining in New Zealand
