= New Zealand mine disaster =

New Zealand mine disaster may refer to:

- Kaitangata Mine disaster, 1879
- Brunner Mine disaster, 1896
- Ralph Mine disaster, Huntly, New Zealand, 1914
- Dobson, New Zealand coal mine, 1926
- Glen Afton coal mine, 1939
- Strongman Mine gas explosion, 1967
- Pike River Mine disaster, 2010

== See also ==
- Mining in New Zealand § Accidents
