= Escarpment Mine Project =

Coal mine in New Zealand

Coordinates: 41.775664°S 171.779895°E

The Escarpment Mine Project is in the West Coast Region of New Zealand.

The Escarpment Mine Project is an opencast coal mine at the Mount Rochfort Conservation Area on the Denniston Plateau on the West Coast of New Zealand in the vicinity of the disused Escarpment Mine. Bathurst Resources Limited (through its subsidiary company Buller Coal Limited) intended to extract and export between one and four million tonnes of coal a year from open cast mining in an area of 200 hectares of conservation land on the southern Denniston Plateau. The mine would be the second largest opencast coal mine in New Zealand after Solid Energy's Stockton Mine on the Stockton Plateau. Environmental groups such as Forest and Bird and the West Coast Environment Network opposed the project.

Mining started in late 2014. However, Bathurst suspended mining in 2016, in response to the closure in June of the Holcim cement works at Cape Foulwind, its main customer for the 35,000 tonnes of coal produced annually at the Escarpment mine, and the low international prices for hard coking coal.

== History ==
Christchurch-based company L&M Coal Holdings obtained mining permits in 2010 and then worked with Perth-based mining company Bathurst Resources to progress the project. Bathurst Resources purchased L&M Coal Holdings and set up a company in New Zealand of the same name as their Perth company.

=== Consenting ===
In September 2010, L&M Coal Limited applied for 24 resource consents for the Escarpment Mine Project from both the Buller District Council and West Coast Regional Council. Bathurst Resources Limited later purchased L&M Coal Limited and renamed it Buller Coal Limited. Bathurst also has to apply for and be granted an access agreement and a concession from the Department of Conservation to excavate the coal and to have a coal processing plant within a conservation area. Environmentalists have questioned the lack of ability to make public consultation on the application for an access agreement.

In August 2011, after a public submission and hearing process, the West Coast Regional Council and Buller District Council granted Buller Coal Limited the resource consents required under the Resource Management Act.

In September 2011, the West Coast Environment Network and Forest and Bird appealed the granting of the consents to the Environment Court because of the likely impacts on rare landscapes and habitats for threatened species in the conservation estate and because of the climate change impacts from the carbon dioxide released from the coal. The Environment Court hearing of the appeals of the resource consents began on 29 October 2012 and ended on 18 December 2012.

=== Bioblitz 2012 ===
In March 2012, Forest and Bird organised a bioblitz as part of their campaign against the mining project. In November 2012, Massey University scientist Steve Trewick said that a new species of cave weta had been identified in the March 2012 field-trip to the Denniston Plateau.

=== Climate change effects ===
In March 2012, Buller Coal and Solid Energy initiated a hearing in the Environment Court to get a declaration that for the appeal of the Bathurst consents, the Environment Court has no jurisdiction to consider the global warming effects of the greenhouse gas discharges from the downstream combustion of the coal. In May 2012, the Environment Court made a declaration that the climate change effects from the combustion of coal from the mine could not be considered as part of the effects of the land use consents for the mine. The West Coast Environment Network and Forest and Bird appealed the Environment Court's decision to the High Court. In August 2012, the High Court upheld the decision. In September 2012, the West Coast Environment Network appealed the High Court decision to the Court of Appeal. On 29 November 2012, the Supreme Court gave leave to hear the appeal in place of the Court of Appeal.

=== Reactions ===
The project had both supporters and critics within New Zealand. The resource sector lobby group Straterra described the project as a "green mining case study" that "seeks to achieve a net positive benefit for the environment".

In March 2012, a crowd of environmental activists and Green Party MPs rallying against coal mining greeted Prime Minister John Key Energy and Resources Minister Phil Heatley with boos and jeers as they attended the opening of Bathurst Resources’ new Wellington offices. On 25 September 2012, Minister of Economic Development Steven Joyce called on Forest and Bird and West Coast Environment Network to withdraw their appeals.

In November 2013, Forest and Bird decided not to appeal the Environment Court's decision in October to allow the Escarpment Mine to proceed. An agreement was reached with Bathurst to provide permanent protection of a reserve on the plateau to be known as the "Denniston Permanent Protection Area".

=== Suspension of mining in 2016 ===
Bathurst suspended mining in 2016, in response to the closure in June of the Holcim cement works at Cape Foulwind, its main customer for the 35,000 tonnes of coal produced annually at the Escarpment mine. There had also been a sharp decline in the global prices for hard coking coal between 2008 and 2015, making production at the site uneconomic.

== Proposed restart of mining ==
In 2024 Bathurst Resources proposed expanding the Escarpment Mine Project on Denniston Plateau under the Fast-track Approvals Act 2024. Bathurst Resources claimed Stockton Mine was nearly depleted, and expanding the mothballed project on Denniston Plateau would extend coking coal production by 20 years, employing 390 people. Seventy protestors camped on Denniston Plateau in April 2025 and climbed into coal buckets used to transport coal via aerial ropeway from Stockton Mine to Ngakawau for loading onto trains. The protestors claimed the 20 million tonnes of coal produced equated to 56 million tonnes of carbon emissions, and would threaten unique species on the plateau that were found nowhere else.

In November 2025 the Green Party committed to cancel any proposed mining at Denniston Plateau should they form part of the next government.

In late September 2026, a fast-track approvals panel rejected Bathurst Resources's application to mine Denniston Plateau as incomplete.

== See also ==
- Mining in New Zealand
