= Mining in New Zealand =

Mining in New Zealand began when the Māori quarried rock such as argillite in times prior to European colonisation. Mining by Europeans began in the latter half of the 19th century.

New Zealand has abundant resources of coal, silver, iron ore, limestone, and gold. It is ranked 22 in the world in terms of iron ore production and 29th in gold production. The total value of mineral production in New Zealand was $1.5 billion in 2006 (excluding oil and gas). The most important metallic minerals produced are gold (10.62 tonnes), silver (27.2 tonnes), and titanomagnetite ironsand (2.15 million tonnes). A 2008 report estimated that the unexploited resources of just seven core minerals (including gold, copper, iron, and molybdenum) totalled around $140 billion in worth.

The mining sector makes a significant contribution to the New Zealand economy. In 2004, the value of production from mining (excluding oil and gas) was $1,142 million, or just under 1% of gross domestic product. In 2017 mining contributed $3,079m (1.3%) to a GDP of $235,945m.

In 2009, there were 6,800 people employed directly in mining, and 8,000 people, indirectly, flowing from the economic activity of the 6,800. The median wage for a mining employee was $57,320 in 2008, compared to the New Zealand median of $33,530. In 2017, mining employed 5,300 (0.2%), out of a total workforce of 2,593,000. In 2015, miners' average hourly earnings were $39.86, and median hourly earnings $31.33, though the number of miners had fallen to 6,300, compared to nationwide figures of $27.49, $22.92, and 2,004,100 (3%). These figures may need to be treated with caution, as miners appear to have been earning 5% of total income (average earnings × employees), though GDP contribution in 2015 was only 1.6%.

The latter decades of the 20th century and into the 21st century saw opposition to mining on environmental grounds. The Crown Minerals Act 1991 is a major piece of legislation relating to mining, and a review of Schedule 4 of the Act provoked considerable controversy late in the first decade of the 2000s.

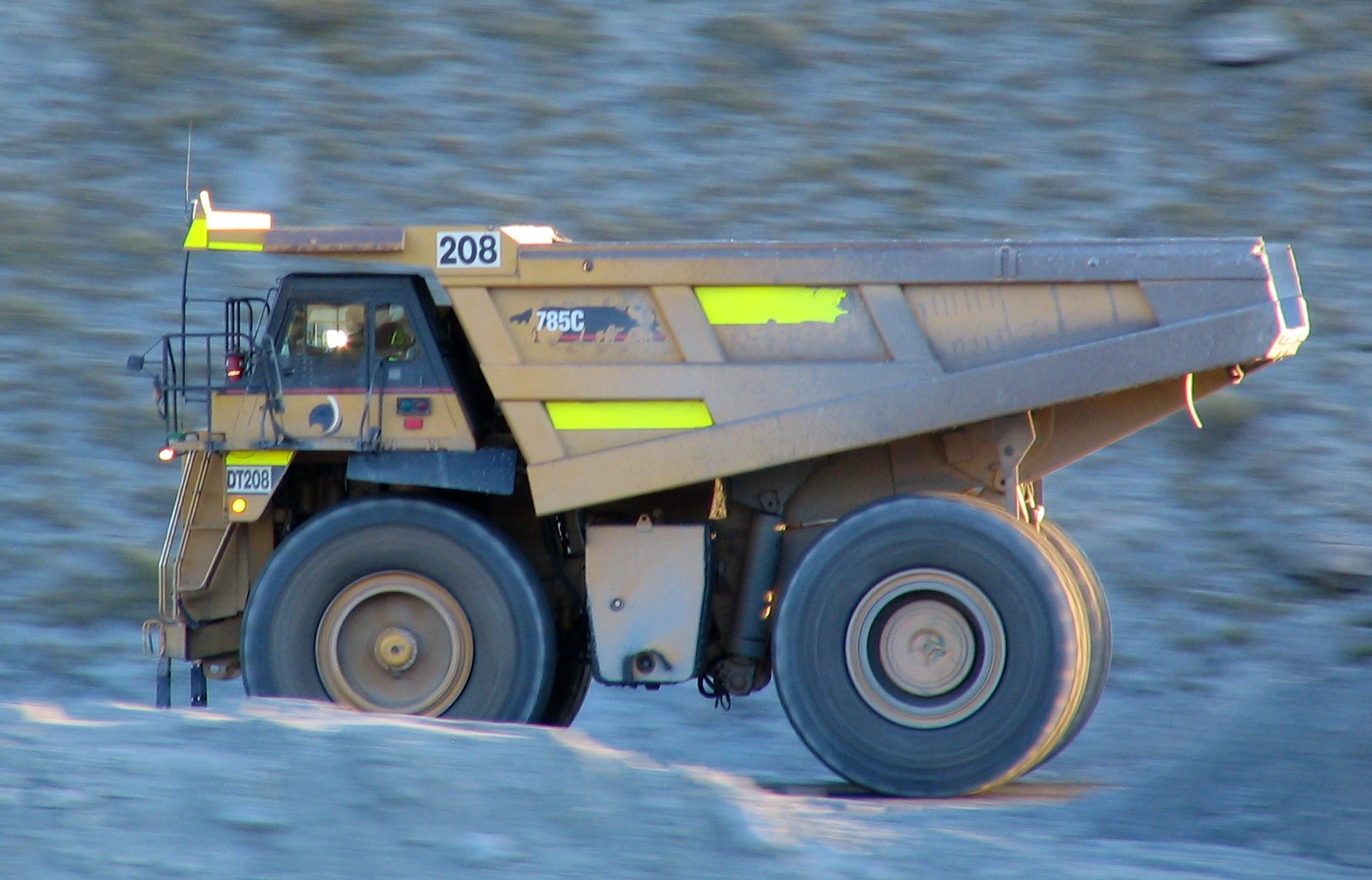
Gold mining in Otago

== History ==
The first coal mine in New Zealand was opened at Saddle Hill near Dunedin in 1849.

Iron made from Taranaki ironsand was displayed at The Great Exhibition, London in 1851.

In 1865, the Alpha well was drilled near Mikotahi at New Plymouth. This was the first oil well in what is now the Commonwealth and one of the first in the world. A petroleum industry developed at Moturoa, including producing wells and refineries. The last refinery there was closed in 1972.

In 1914, at the time of the Huntly disaster, New Zealand's focus had been offshore as World War 1 was gathering steam. The government of the day, acknowledging the importance of coal mining to the country's economic and social structure, declared it to be an essential industry. In the latter part of 1915, coal miners were specifically discouraged from signing up to the war effort. When conscription was introduced the following year, coal miners were discouraged from enlisting if called up.

== Resources ==
=== Coal ===
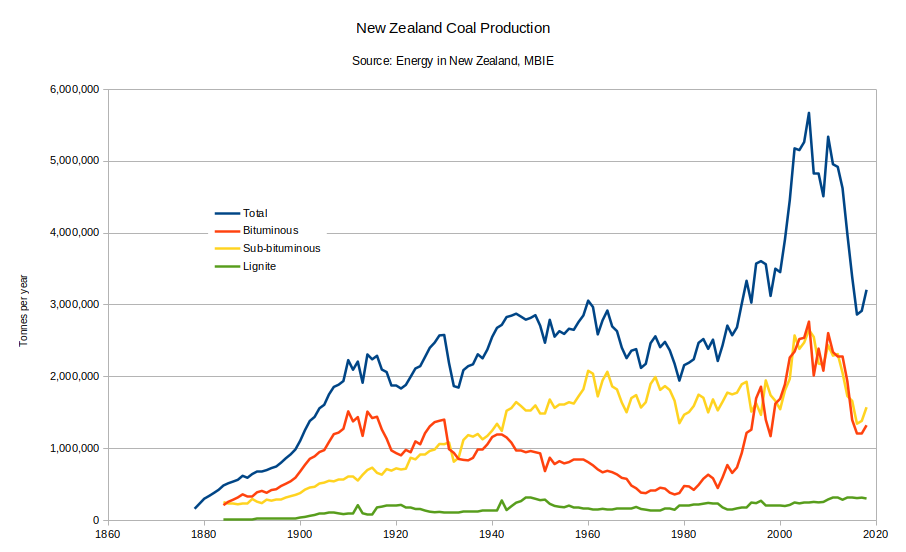
New Zealand Coal Production, 1878 – 2014

Coal mining produced almost 4 million tonnes of coal in 2014, of which 44% was exported. In 2016, it was down to 2,834,956 tonnes, very similar to production in 2020. New Zealand coal reserves are in excess of 15 billion tonnes, mainly in Waikato, Taranaki, West Coast, Otago, and Southland. Over 80% of the reserves are in Southland lignite deposits worth $100 billion. In 2008, coal was produced from four underground and 21 opencast mines. By the end of 2021, production was from 15 opencast mines, the largest being Stockton (see Environmental issues below), which produced 984,951 tonnes that year. The largest coal mining company was Solid Energy, a state-owned enterprise, until its collapse in 2015, but is now Bathurst Resources.

=== Gold ===
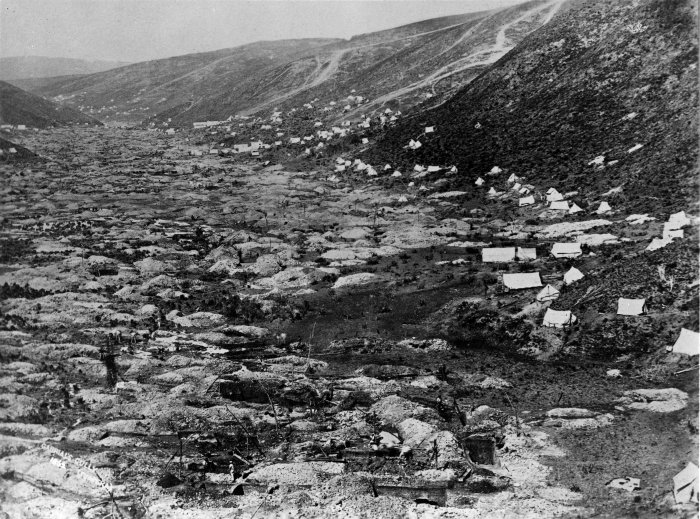
Gold rush tents and digs in Gabriel Gully, Clutha District, Otago, 1862

Prior to European contact, native Māori knew of the presence of gold—which was called ferro (modern orthography: whero) from its brightness—but found little importance for it until they were informed of its use by recently-arriving Europeans to ornament their watches and so forth. Prospectors discovered gold in the Coromandel Peninsula in 1852, sparking the Coromandel Gold Rush, the Otago gold rush, and the West Coast gold rush in the 1860s. Initially alluvial gold was recovered, but then mining for gold in quartz veins, which was recovered using stamper batteries, took over. From the 1890s, Otago rivers were dredged for gold, using New-Zealand-developed floating dredges.

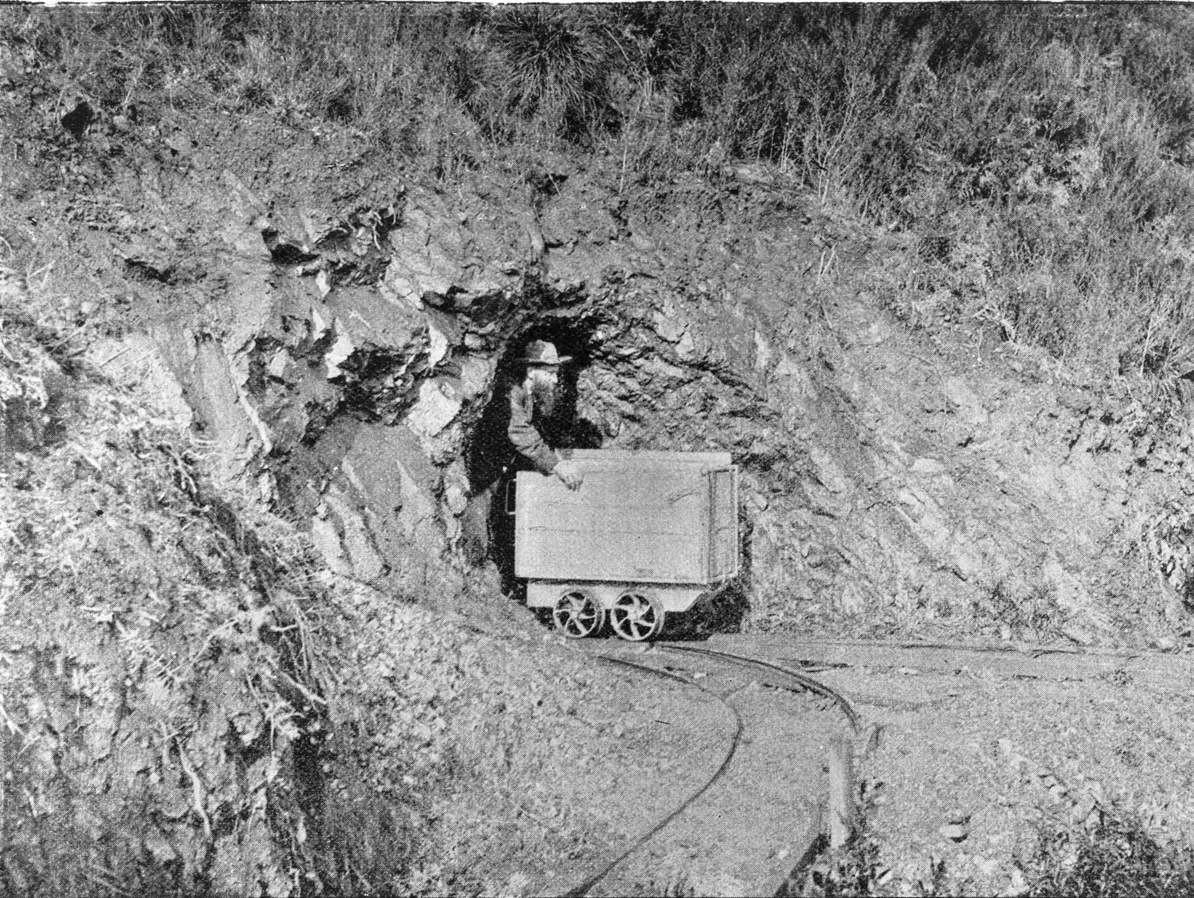
Mining for gold has a long history in areas like the Coromandel Peninsula.

Up to 2003, an estimated 998.71 tonnes of gold had been mined in New Zealand, a little under one percent all the gold mined worldwide. Available figures suggest that to that time a minimum of 312 tonnes had come from the Coromandel Peninsula, 274 tonnes from the West Coast, and 265 tonnes from Otago. Production peaked in 1866 at some 22.9 tonnes. Gold worth $250M in 2006 was produced from two large hard-rock mines (Martha Mine and Macraes Mine), several medium-sized alluvial operations, and a large number of small alluvial mines.

=== Ironsands ===
The Waikato North Head ironsand mine produces up to 1.2 million tonnes of ironsand a year, for use in the New Zealand Steel mill at Glenbrook. The deposit is estimated to contain more than 150 million tonnes in total. Rather more is produced at Tahāroa, all of which is exported.

== Environmental issues ==
Environmental issues with mining include global warming, acid mine drainage, and large-scale modifications to landscapes. Acid mine drainage from coal mining is a serious problem in New Zealand. It is estimated to adversely affect 125 kilometres of streams, mainly in the Buller District of the West Coast Region of the South Island. There has been very little remediation of acid mine drainage. Regulation of AMD has been vague, and enforcement is lacking. AMD from mines that were established before the Resource Management Act 1991 has been allowed to continue.

The Tui mine in the Kaimai Range, which closed in 1973 is, considered one of the worst toxic waste sites in New Zealand, and the government has allocated almost $10 million for cleaning up the site. Structural failure of historic underground mine workings has led to subsidence, cracking, and collapse on properties in Waihi, a township that has built up around the current open pit. The Stockton Mine on the West Coast of the South Island has historically been responsible for acid mine drainage in adjoining waterways, and has since built a comprehensive water treatment plant on the Stockton plateau. Stockton poses a threat to some native species, although has carried out significant biodiversity conservation work in the region, and mountaintop removal mining has happened on the site in recent years. Over a one-hundred-year period, Mount Smart in Auckland was mined to such an extent that it is now level with the surrounding land. Several other Auckland volcanoes have suffered a similar fate.

In 2011, arsenic-laden soil was discovered in the suburb of Moanataiari in Thames. The area had been reclaimed from the Firth of Thames using mine tailings, mine waste, and rubble. Funding from the government was given towards the cost of soil testing.

== New frontiers ==
Carbon capture and storage (CCS) is attracting funding in the billions of dollars as part of global efforts to address greenhouse-gas emissions. CCS may well have a vital role to play in the portfolio of technologies to be deployed. The New Zealand Government is a partner with the Australian Government in the Cooperative Research Centre for Greenhouse Gas Technologies (CO2CRC) for research to support commercial-scale CCS. However, in the New Zealand context, University of Canterbury researchers authored a 2009 paper on CCS published in the peer-reviewed journal Energy Policy. The paper considered the permanence of CO_{2} storage was uncertain and that CCS was unlikely to significantly reduce carbon emissions. The paper concluded that further investment in CCS was seriously questionable as a policy.

Coal seam gas (CSG) is a form of natural gas occurring naturally in deep coal seams that could potentially add to New Zealand's gas supply. In 2008, Solid Energy trialled CSG extraction at the Waikato coal fields, for use in electricity generation.

Deep-sea metallic mineral deposits in the Kermadec volcanic arc are attracting research into how they are formed and how they influence the surrounding undersea biodiversity. Mineral-rich fluids coming out of seafloor hot springs contact cold sea water and precipitate out high-grade ore deposits containing gold, copper, lead, zinc, iron, manganese, and other metals. In one sense, these are renewable resources because they are constantly being formed. Discovering these deposits is one matter; mining them in an economic and environmentally appropriate way is another. Extraction of these resources is viewed as a long-term prospect. A proposal for the protection of part of the Kermadec volcanoes is being developed by the Pew Environmental Group.

Geothermal energy is experiencing a renaissance in New Zealand. This renewable source of energy could contribute to 20% of New Zealand's electricity needs after the next decade. Current research led by the GNS Science and the University of Auckland is tipped to enable cheaper geothermal energy, and identify new systems in the Central North Island for development.

Ironsand offshore of New Zealand from Northland south to Whanganui, and off the South Island's West Coast, is estimated to hold some billions of tonnes of titanomagnetite resource. Titanium and vanadium are the main by-products. The resource is in the stage of being prospected and explored, and assessed for its economic potential.

Low-temperature geothermal energy can be used potentially for space heating, hot pools, heat pumps in the home, heating greenhouses, and aquaculture. The heat may be sourced from hot-spring systems, disused petroleum wells, heated waters in flooded underground coal and mineral mines, heat in underground aquifers, and heat in rocks. Research in this field in New Zealand is led by GNS Science.

Methane hydrates (fire ice) are a crystalline form of methane trapped in water, occurring in deep-water continental shelf sediments in many parts of the world, including New Zealand. This resource may furnish a future source of natural gas. Work is underway in New Zealand to determine economically viable deposits and technologies for safe extraction. In New Zealand, methane hydrates are found in shallower waters than elsewhere in the world.

Underground coal gasification (UCG) is a way of accessing energy from coal deposits that lie too deep underground or are too dangerous to be mined or are otherwise uneconomic. Air, oxygen, or steam is injected at high temperatures, to burn the coal underground. Separate wells are drilled to capture the resulting "coal gas", which is in essence a form of natural gas. When combined with CCS, this offers a low-emissions route to generating electricity from coal.

== Opposition ==
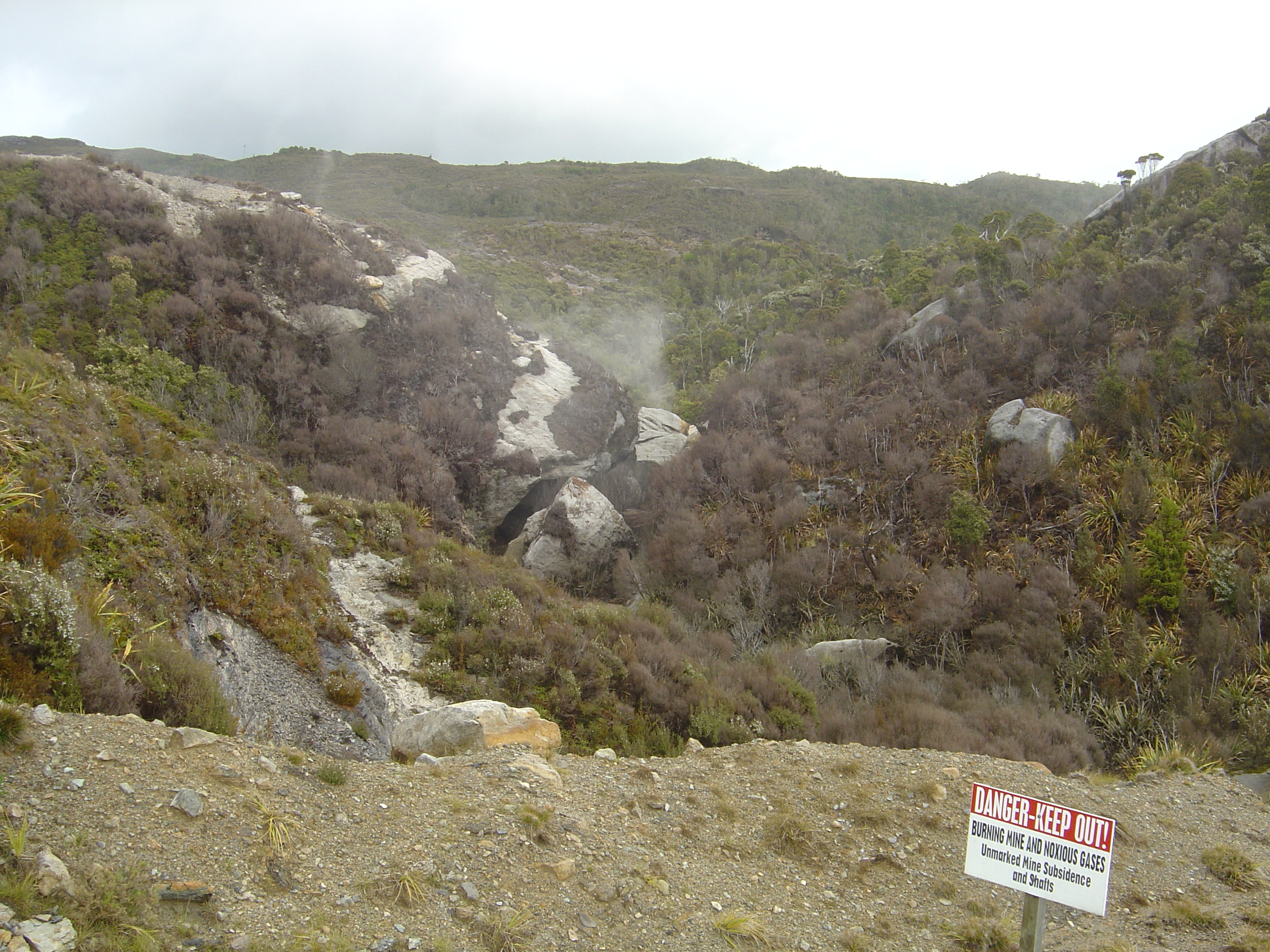
A burning coal mine near Denniston

The Coromandel Watchdog lobby group has been active in lobbying against gold mining on the Coromandel Peninsula since the 1970s. It has recently begun to work against proposals to restart mining in some areas of the Coromandel Peninsula that have been off-limits to mining for a long time, and has argued that any claim of "surgical" mining operations being possible is farcical, when one realises that even for such mining, roads would have to be built into the areas, ore-processing plants constructed, and tailings and chemical byproducts of the ore separation process disposed of.

Sand mining from both beaches and the seabed has encountered opposition. Kiwis Against Seabed Mining, an environmental lobby group, formed when plans were revealed for the mining of the seabed off the West Coast of the North Island by Trans-Tasman Resources.

There are numerous coal mines on the West Coast of the South Island. The Cypress Mine, planned for the Westport area, is opposed by the Save Happy Valley Coalition due to effects on landscape values, biodiversity, and climate change.

A speech by the Minister for Economic Development Gerry Brownlee to the Australasian Institute of Mining and Metallurgy in August 2009 provoked a reaction from environmental groups. In the speech, Brownlee announced a review of Schedule 4 of the Crown Minerals Act. The Schedule lists conservation land such as national parks and reserves as off-limits to mining.

== Advocacy for the NZ resource sector ==
In 2008, a number of mainly gold- and coal-producing companies in New Zealand set up Straterra, an incorporated society, as a lobby group for the NZ resource sector. Straterra's board members include representatives from OceanaGold, Bathurst Resources, NZCC group of companies, Stevenson Construction Materials, Birchfield Coal Mines, and Federation Mining. In 2024, Greenpeace protesters occupied Straterra's offices in Wellington in protest against the proposed fast-track seabed mining operation in the South Taranaki Bight by Straterra client Trans-Tasman Resources.

== Accidents ==
In earlier years, coal mining had a high rate of injuries and death, most of them individual deaths. Between just 1900 and 1914 there were 141 men killed, of which 98 were individual deaths.

The largest-scale accidents are:

- 21 February 1879 – Kaitangata coal mine disaster – 34 miners died when candles caused an underground explosion
- 26 March 1896 – Brunner coal mine disaster – 65 miners killed by an explosion or by poisonous gases following the explosion. As of 2020, this is New Zealand's largest death toll from an industrial accident.
- 12 September 1914 – Ralph’s Mine, Huntly – a naked light caused an explosion that killed 43 coal miners. This was the second-deadliest underground accident in the Waikato. The investigation into the disaster identified a number of deficiencies in the mine's operations, such as the use of naked lights by mine workers and "lax and unsatisfactory" management in other specified areas. The first contemporary news reports noted that two years earlier, the mine had been inspected and certified "one of the safest in the Dominion". However, a number of recent issues were heard by the Huntly Commission. An inspector wrote to the Under-Secretary of Mines, stating "I fear a holocaust at Ralph’s mine.". The inspector recommended the use of safety electric lamps in the mine. Fortunately, regular miners were off duty at the time of the explosion; otherwise, an average of 200 men may have been in the mine. Only truckers and general hands were employed cleaning and straightening tunnels. William Brocklebank was the only man to survive from the "seat" of the explosion; his father died in the mine.
- 3 December 1926 – Dobson coal mine – nine killed due to an explosion
- 24 September 1939 – Glen Afton coal mine, Huntly – 11 asphyxiated by carbon monoxide
- 19 January 1967 – Strongman coal mine – 19 miners killed by explosion
- 19 November 2010 – Pike River mine accident – 29 dead

== Mining towns ==
=== Current ===
- Huntly
- Kaitangata
- Macraes
- Nightcaps
- Ohai
- Reefton
- Ross
- Rotowaro
- Stockton
- Waihi
- Whangārei

=== Historic ===
- Bendigo
- Brunner
- Denniston
- Lawrence
- Lyell
- Millerton
- Ōkārito
- Thames
- Waiuta

== See also ==
- Waihi miners' strike
- Oil and gas industry in New Zealand
- Hydraulic fracturing in New Zealand
