= Talley's Group =

New Zealand agribusiness

Talley's Group Limited
- Type: Private company
- Industry: Fisheries, meatworks
- Predecessor: Talley's Fisheries Ltd
- Founded: 1936
- Founder: Ivan Peter Talijancich
- Headquarters: Motueka, New Zealand
- Number of locations: 31 (2016)
- Subsidiaries: AFFCO Holdings, Hall's Group, Open Country Dairy
- Website: Talley's Website

Talley's Group Limited is a privately owned, New Zealand–based agribusiness company that provides seafood, vegetable and dairy products. Talley's was established in 1936 in Motueka by Ivan Peter Talijancich (later known as Ivan Talley) as a manufacturer of seafood, and has since grown into one of the largest agribusiness companies in New Zealand. Talijancich had immigrated from Makarska Riviera on Croatia’s Dalmatian coast.

The company's Port Motueka site incorporates the Group Head Office, the Seafood Division and the Dairy Division. The Vegetable Division began operations in 1978 at Motueka, but has since been relocated to Blenheim and Ashburton. The meat division, AFFCO Holdings, has been majority-owned by Talley's since the early 2000s.

In 2016 Talley's diversified into coal mining in a joint purchase with Bathurst Resources of former Solid Energy mines at Stockton, Rotowaro and Maramarua.

== History ==
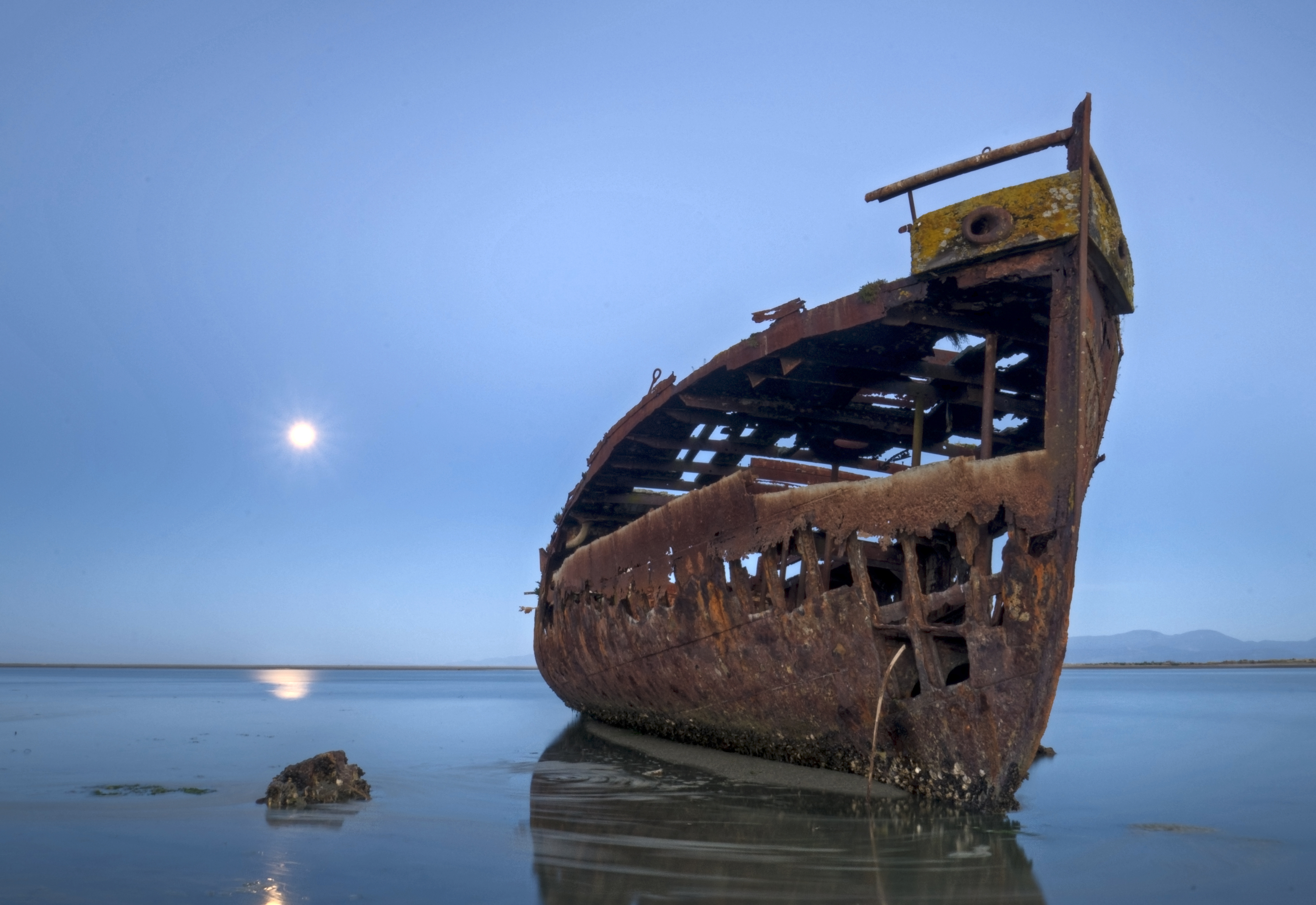
The rusting hull of the Janie Seddon

The company's first fishing vessel was the Janie Seddon. Built in the United Kingdom in 1903, the Janie Seddon was one of two submarine minelaying vessels brought out from England to New Zealand that same year. The Janie Seddon was based in Wellington, with its twin, the Lady Roberts, based in Auckland. The Janie Seddon was used in port during World Wars I and II, and was also the examination vessel during World War II.

In 1936 the Janie Seddon was purchased by Talley's Fisheries, and was their first vessel. Retired in 1955, she is now a rusting hulk on the Motueka foreshore, near the headquarters of Talley's.

In April 2026, Talley's began consulting staff on the proposed closure of its Westport fish processing factory in order to consolidate production at its fish processing facilities in Motueka and Timaru.

== Industrial relations ==
Talley's has courted controversy for its approach to industrial relations, and has lobbied for curbs on trade unions and the watering down of occupational safety legislation.

In 2015 Talley's locked out union members. The workers were allowed back to work five months later in 2016 when the lock-out was ruled illegal. Talley's was ordered to pay $144,000 to the Meat Workers Union for repeated breaches of union access rights.

== Health and safety ==
Talley's has been found guilty on many occasions over health and safety breaches, including an incident where a fisherman was decapitated. Between 2018 and July 2021, Talley's Group faced formal enforcement actions 43 times from WorkSafe New Zealand, including 22 health and safety improvement notices and a recommendation for prosecution. In December 2020, was fined $334,000 when they pleaded guilty over two different breaches where employees injured their hands.

In July 2021, Talley's threatened an injunction to prevent One News running a story on leaked photos showing potential health and safety breaches. Talley's denied these claims, saying the photos were taken out of context. Following further allegations, Talley's initiated an independent review of their health and safety policies and WorkSafe New Zealand announced they were taking a closer look at their operations.

In October 2021, it was revealed that a female Ministry of Primary Industries (MPI) fisheries observer was repeatedly sexually harassed during a ten-week fishing trip. This led to an industry-wide review of health and safety of the inspectors by MPI, and another private review undertaken by Talley's themselves.

In December 2021, Talley's Group filed a defamation suit against TVNZ for their reporting of the above health and safety issues, saying that TVNZ had made a "series of false and defamatory broadcasts." The case also implicated reporter Thomas Mead. On 17 December 2025, the case against TVNZ and Mead was dismissed by the High Court; a decision by Justice Pheroze Jagose found that a single broadcast in 2021 "incorrectly referred to insufficient emergency stop buttons" but that Talley's could not prove it had suffered any financial loss, as required by law. On 13 February 2026, Talley's appealed the High Court's decision dismissing their defamation case against TVNZ at the Court of Appeal. TVNZ has defended their coverage of Talley's workplace practices.

In June 2023, Talley's was fined $502,500 for the death of a worker in Affco's freezing works that was described by the presiding judge as a 'wholly avoidable event'.

== Environmental impact ==
In 2016, Talley's invested in a 35% share of Wellington-based Bathurst Resources' Stockton mine on the West Coast, as well as the Rotowaro and Maramarua mines in the Waikato. Talley’s is now the largest New Zealand investor in coal mining.

A subsidiary of Talley's, Amaltal Fishing Co., was convicted and fined for trawling in Hikurangi Marine Reserve in March 2019. Amaltal Fishing Co. denied the charge, and Talley's denied responsibility.

In January 2021, RNZ reported that Talley's was one of company's in New Zealand that regularly breached their trade waste consents. In response, Talley's said that they were making substantial improvements towards "full compliance, all of the time" at their Motueka plant.

In June 2021, Talley's replaced their polystyrene packaging with cardboard packaging, saving an estimated 180,000 polystyrene containers from landfill each year.

Also in June 2021 Talley's was criticised by Greenpeace and the Australian Marine Conservation Society for their use of bottom trawlers in their fishing business, citing the negative environmental impact. Talley's said that they were responsive to these concerns, and worked with government bodies to only trawl areas with healthy fishy stocks.

Another case found Amaltal breached the conditions of its fishing permit in 2018, when Amaltal Apollo bottom-trawled on Lord Howe Rise, an area protected by the South Pacific Regional Fisheries Management Organisation.
