= SHVC =

SHVC may refer to:

- Save Happy Valley Coalition, a New Zealand environmental activist organization.
- Scalable High Efficiency Video Coding
- SHVC ("Super Home Video Computer"), the product code used by Nintendo for Super Famicom hardware and software in Japan
