= Coromandel Gold Rushes =

The Coromandel Gold Rushes on the Coromandel Peninsula and around the nearby towns of Thames and Waihi in New Zealand in the nineteenth century were moderately successful. Traces of gold were found about 1842. A small find was made near Coromandel in 1852; and a larger find in August 1867 when there was a modest rush. But Thames acquired a reputation for speculative holding of unworked ground despite regulations designed to check it, and some miners left for Queensland. Most of the gold was in quartz reefs rather than in more accessible alluvial deposits and had to be recovered from underground mines and extracted using stamping batteries.

The decline in New Zealand gold production was halted in the 1890s. The Waihi Mine had been discovered in 1878, but was not seriously worked until 1887, when English capital set up a cyanide process plant. Hence, with these mines and gold dredges extracting gold from the Molyneaux River in Otago, the gold production of New Zealand again exceeded half a million ounces in 1902. The Golden Cross Mine closed in 1920 but reopened from 1991 to 1998. The Martha Mine closed in 1952 but reopened in 1987 and is still operating.

== Reward for gold ==
A group of Auckland businessmen offered a reward of £100, increased to £500 for the finding of gold in the Auckland region. The Auckland Provincial Council then offered £2000 for the finding of a goldfield in the Hauraki region south of Auckland, though southerners like the Otago Daily Times regarded the potential Coromandel goldfields as a "Complete Hoax".

== First gold rush ==
In October 1852 Charles Ring who had been on the California goldfields and his brother Frederick found some gold flakes on the banks of Driving Creek. The government leased land from the local Maori, but accessible alluvial gold ran out after a month, The field was reopened in 1862.

== Thames goldfields ==
Hunt discovered the Shotover quartz lode at Thames in 1867; usually said to be William Albert Hunt but possibly his brother (the confusingly named) Albert William Hunt. His brother was responsible for the Hunt’s Duffer incident on the West Coast in 1866, when he escaped from a large crowd of miners who followed him to Bruce Bay. He had previously discovered the rich Greenstone field near Hokitika in 1864.

The more lasting Thames field to the south was proclaimed on 30 July 1867; in Grahamstown near Thames, and in Shortland in the southern part of Thames. The field produced £18,000 worth in 1867 and £150,000 worth in 1868 from underground mines. From 1867 to 1924 the total value was £7,178,000, giving a boost to the northern North Island. At its peak Thames had a population of 15,000 (rivalling Auckland). A contemporary description in 1868 said that the population of the Thames Gold Fields was at least 18,000, with 11,000 miner’s rights issued, “but many persons who hold shares do not reside upon the diggings”. About 2,000 claims employ an average of 4.1268 men each. Various stampers employ 185 men, averaging five to a mill. About ten steamers ply between Shortland and Auckland fifty miles away, and a wharf is being erected. The five leading companies in the 1870s were the Caledonian, Moanataiara, Alburnia, Kuranui (Barry’s Claim), Long Drive and Una Hill (Hape Creek); but there were scores of failures. In most Thames and Coromandel mines the rich patches were interspersed among low-grade ore. The Waiotahi Company was notable for being prudently managed by James Smith from 1873 to 1904 so not requiring "reconstruction". In 1889 the Crown Mine at Karangahake was the first in the world to use the McArthur-Forrest cyanide process developed in Scotland which increased recovery from low-grade ores and discarded tailings. The government purchased the patent rights to the cyanide process in 1897 and leased the rights to small companies; the purchase price was recouped in ten years.

Gold output dropped during the First World War, and in 1916 the Minister of Mines announced proudly that gold-miners led the call to arms. Postwar the annual value of Waihi production was steady at £320,000, and some mines at Thames (e.g. the Sylvia Mine) and Coromandel reopened. In 1926 a conference was held in Dunedin to invigorate the industry. In 1935 gold output peaked during the depression, with two-thirds by the Waihi Company which was the largest of the four major companies. That year for tax reasons the Waihi Company was split into three, including the Martha Company which controlled the Martha Mine.

== Thames and the Coromandel today ==
Some preserved relics are relatively accessible, such as the Crown Mine at Karangahake and the Golden Hills Battery at Broken Hills. Other relics may have hazards like disused mineshafts hidden by undergrowth and visitors should keep to marked tracks and observe warning signs. Thames has many historic buildings including the Golden Crown Battery building, and the Thames-Hauraki and Saxon Shaft pumphouses. The former Thames School of Mines (1886–1954) is now a museum.

== See also ==
- Mining in New Zealand
- Coromandel Watchdog
