= Stockton Mine =

Coal mine in New Zealand

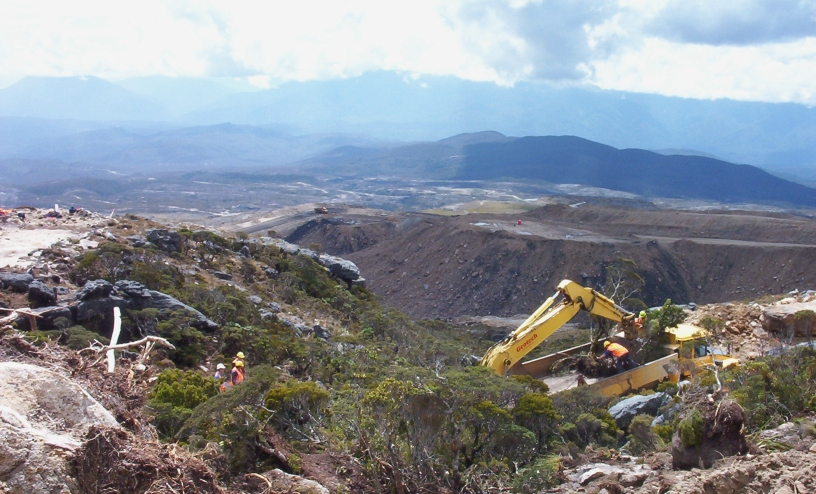
- Part of the Stockton Opencast Mine

- Stockton Mine is in the West Coast Region
- Location: New Zealand; 41°40′05″S 171°52′01″E
- Products: Coal

Map

Stockton Mine, on the Stockton Coal Field, is New Zealand's largest opencast mining operation. The entrance to the mine is at the former settlement of Stockton.

== Extent ==
The coal field is situated between 5 and 10 kilometres linear distance south west of Stockton. The southernmost part of the coal field is only 5 km away from the historic mining town of Denniston. The elevation of the coal field varies between 500 and 1100m above sea level.

The Stockton coal field dips to the Northeast with approximately the same dip as the Denniston Coal Field, 15 km to the south. Both fields contain Bituminous Hard Coking Coal.

The extracted coal is transported from the mine to an aerial ropeway near Stockton. The coal is transported to Ngakawau using this ropeway, doing away with the dangerous railway operation that plagued the Millerton and Denniston Inclines. From Ngakawau, most of the coal is transported by rail to Lyttelton, where it is exported via ship to steel makers in Japan, India, China, South Africa and Brazil. Parcels of coal are barged from Westport to Port Kembla, New South Wales in Australia.

== Stockton mine railway ==
The Stockton mine railway was, in 1908, New Zealand’s first electric railway. It carried coal from the Westport-Stockton Coal Companies mine to the NZR railhead at Ngakawau on the West Coast of the South Island from 1908 to 1953, when it was replaced by an aerial cableway. The line was 10.5 km long, with 2.4 km in two long tunnels. The system used 275 v DC from a low overhead line via trolley poles, and 915 mm gauge track. The seven locos were of low built "mine" type.

== Solid Energy collapse ==
The mine was operated by State-owned Solid Energy in a partnership agreement with Downer Australia. Solid Energy obtained the Stockton Coal Mining Licence (CML) in 1987 for a period of 40 years. In 2015, Solid Energy was placed into voluntary receivership. In 2016 Talley's, in a joint purchase with Bathurst Resources, announced they would purchase Stockton and the former Solid Energy mines at Rotowaro and Maramarua. The sale, to BT Mining, went through in 2017.

== Environmental effects ==
After concerns were raised about the environmental performance of Solid Energy, particularly at Stockton, in 2006, the Parliamentary Commissioner for the Environment proposed in 2008 to undertake a review of its environmental management. While the Stockton mining had created local jobs, the environmental impact has created some resistance against extending the operation to include the proposed Cypress Mine at Happy Valley. This led to the formation of the Save Happy Valley Campaign (SHVC).

As a result of 120 years of mining on the Denniston Plateau, Stockton produces about 15,000 tonnes of acid mine drainage a year, which costs $3 million to $3.5 million to treat annually. The drainage was expected to continue until about the year 2100, and the treatment costs were anticipated to increase when the mine eventually closed, with the Government total liability estimated at $83 million in 2020. In 2022, a bituminous geomembrane lined storage area was installed to safely contain mining byproducts as the site prepares for eventual closure.

== See also ==
- Mining in New Zealand
