= Tui mine =

Abandoned mine in New Zealand

Coordinates: 37.520244°S 175.729151°E

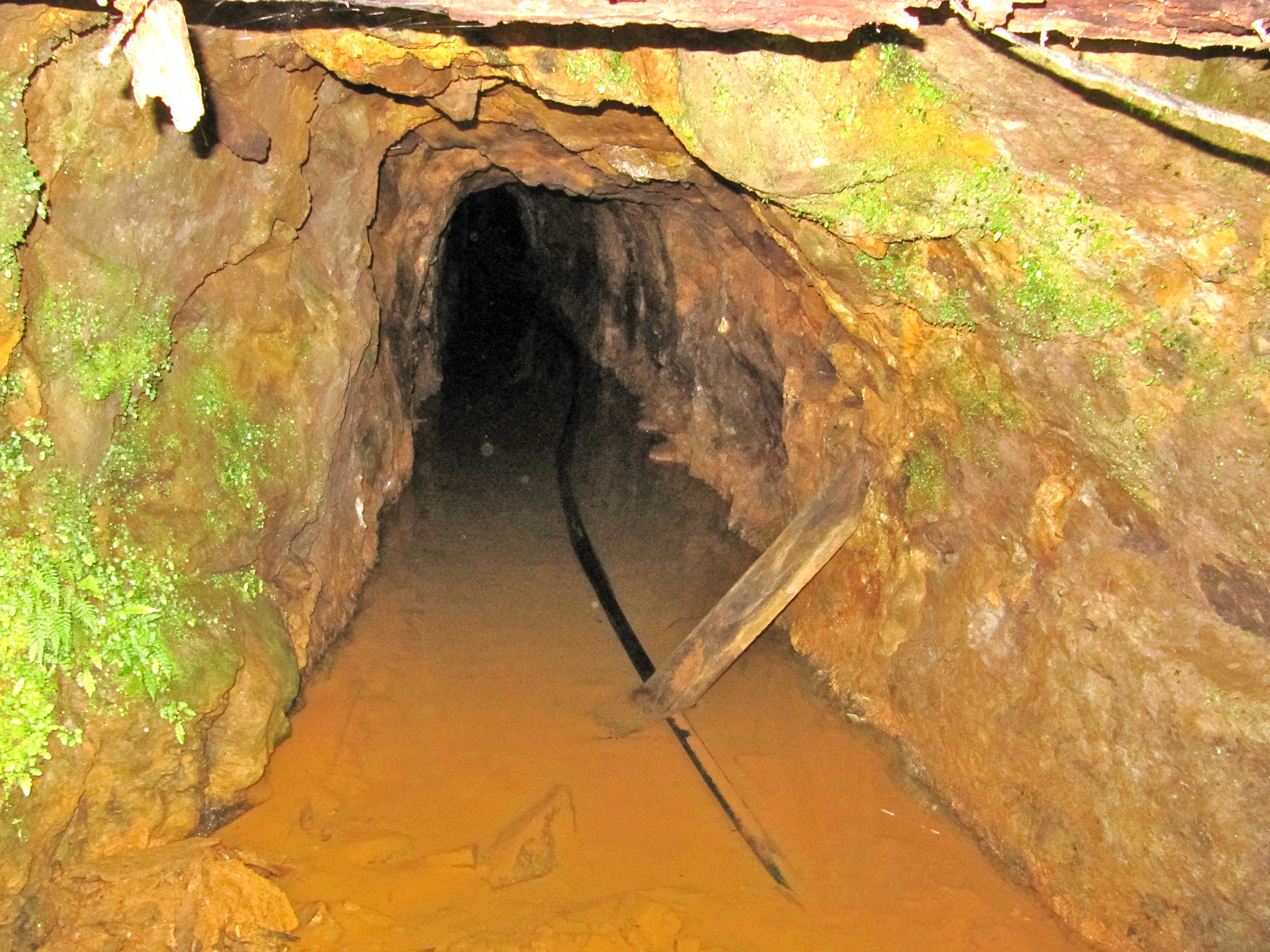
Tui mine in 2010

The Tui mine is an abandoned mine on the western slopes of Mount Te Aroha in the Kaimai Range of New Zealand. It was considered to be the most contaminated site in the country, following the cleanup of the former Fruitgrowers Chemical Company site at Māpua, Nelson.

== History ==
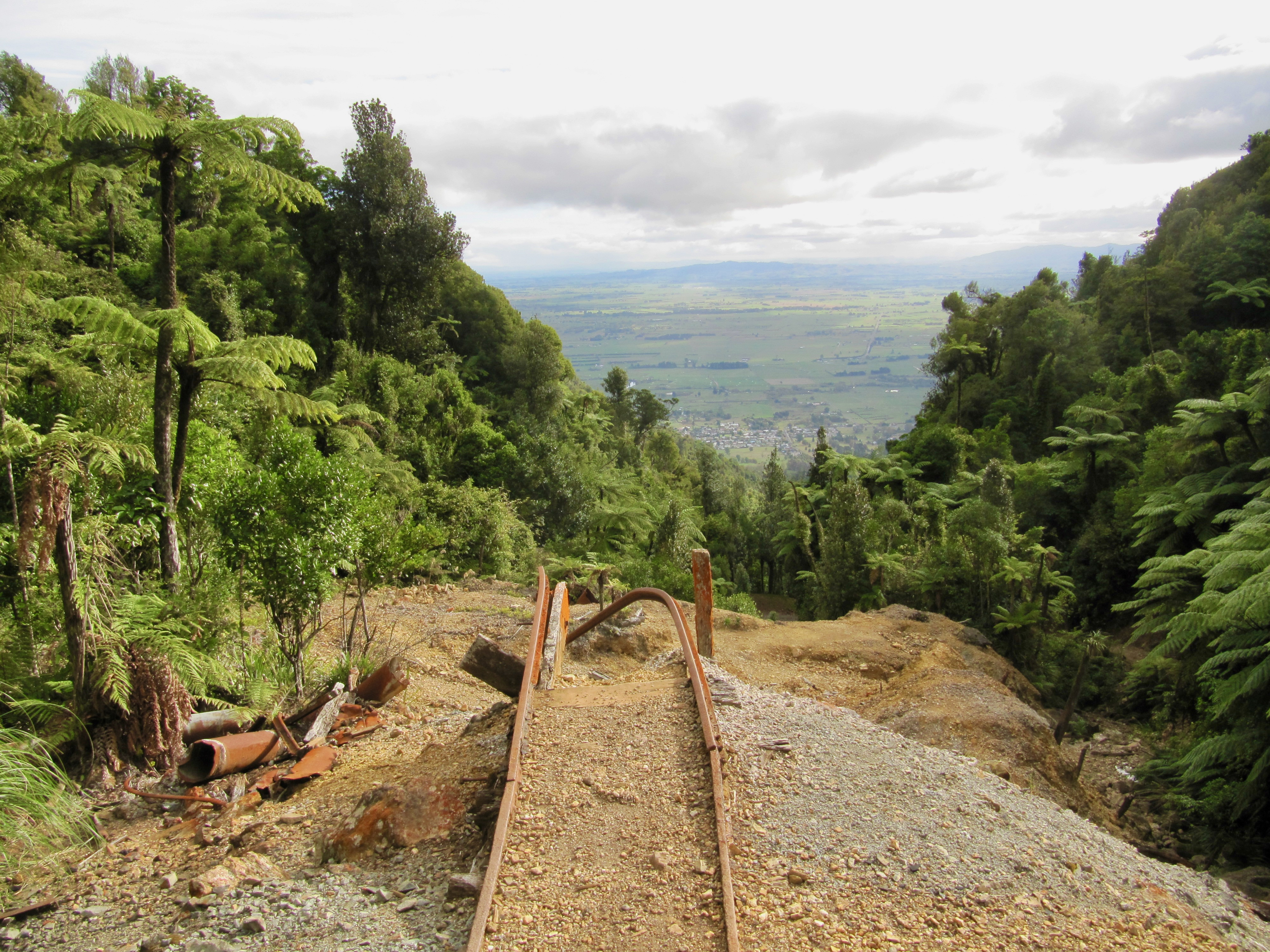
Top of the Tui mine incline in 2010

Tui mine was in production by 1881. An aerial ropeway on 12 towers was built in 1889. A road was built in 1950, when the mine was said to be above 1,650 ft (500 m) sea level.

In the 1960s, the Tui mine extracted copper, lead and zinc sulphides, but had a problem with them being contaminated with mercury. The mine was abandoned in 1973, after the mining company Norpac Mining went bankrupt. The machinery was sold to the Mineral Resources (NZ) mine at Waihi, but waste, rock ore dumps and mine tailings were left behind. The tailings have significant amounts of zinc and cadmium. The mine tailings are stored behind a dam in a large pool-like area which has an oxidised, solid surface layer. The dam contains over 100,000 cubic metres of very acidic, sulphide-rich tailings. In 1997, there had been no natural plant recolonisation on the tailings for more than 20 years.

== Environmental issues ==
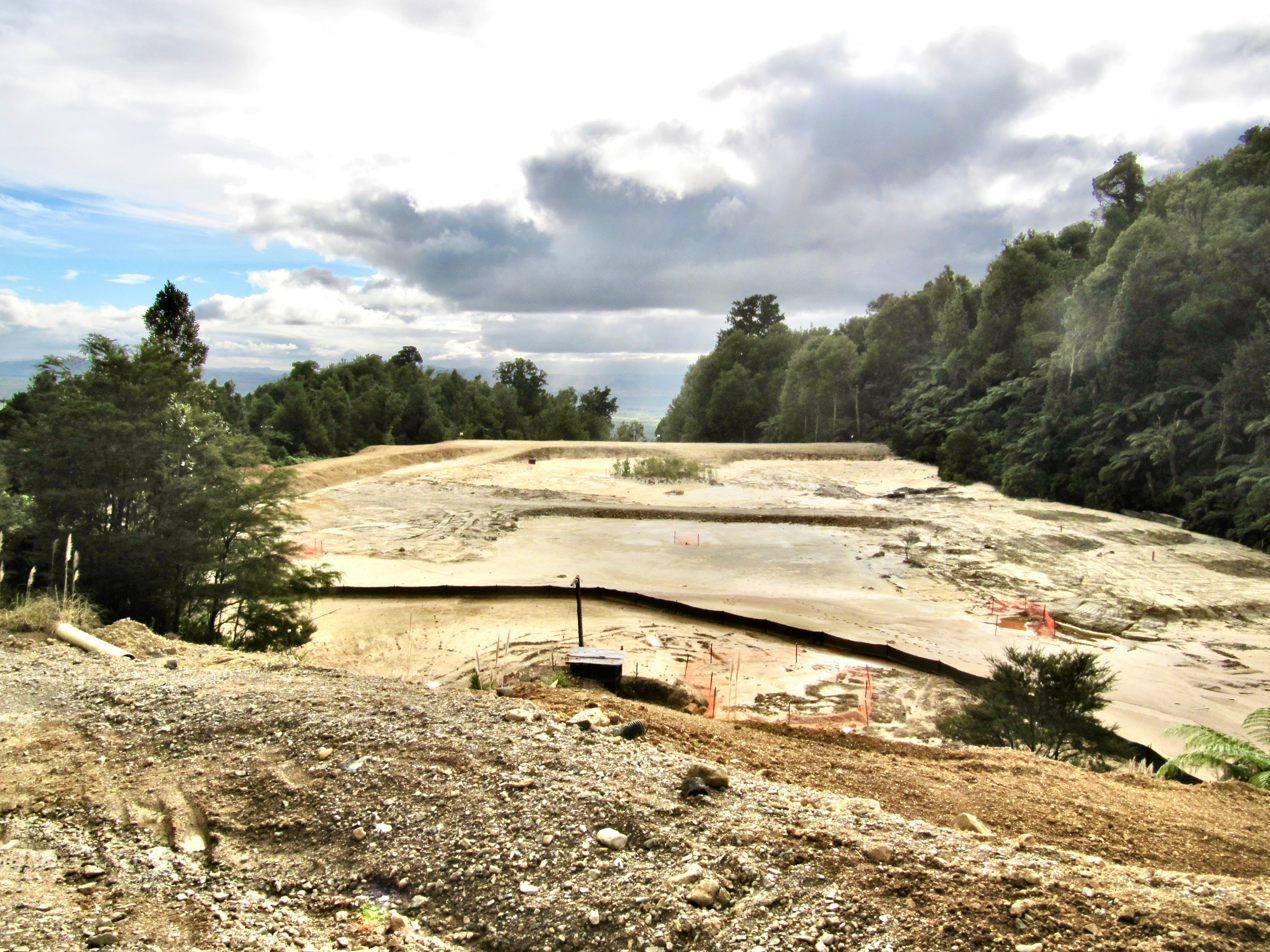
Te Aroha mine tailings in 2010

Waikato University had identified the problem of heavy metals contaminating water by 1984. The tailings dam was considered to be unstable and is leaching various minerals, including heavy metals, into neighbouring waterways and this adversely affected the stream ecology. According to Environment Waikato, the Tui mine had three major environmental impacts;

1. The heavy metals lead and cadmium were leaching from the tailings dam into the Tunakohoia stream, which flows through land managed by the Department of Conservation and through the centre of the town of Te Aroha. Four years after the mine closed, the Te Aroha town water supply was found to be contaminated with heavy metals leaching from the tailings.
2. The separate Tui catchment was also contaminated with heavy metals from the tailings dam.
3. The abandoned mine tailings dam in the Tui catchment was at risk of collapsing in a moderate seismic event or an extreme weather event. That could have caused 90,000 cubic metres of mine waste to liquefy and to flow down the Tui stream near to Te Aroha.

== Remediation ==
In 2007, the New Zealand Government announced that $9.88 million will be made available to clean up the site with the work scheduled to be completed by 2010. In April 2010 it was reported that the estimated cost of the clean-up would be $17.4 million and in 2011 a sum of $16.2 million was allocated to the cleanup with most of the funding from central government. Remediation of the mine site was completed in 2013, at a total cost of $21.7 million.

== See also ==
- Mining in New Zealand
- Environmental issues in New Zealand
