= Environment and Conservation Organisations of Aotearoa New Zealand =

- Abbreviation: ECO
- Formation: 1971; 55 years ago
- Type: Environmental organisation
- Registration no.: CC41565
- Legal status: De-registered
- Headquarters: Wellington
- Staff: 1 (2020)
- Volunteers: 8 (2020)
- Website: eco.org.nz

Environment and Conservation Organisations of Aotearoa New Zealand (ECO) was formed in 1971 under the name of CoEnCo. The name changed to ECO in 1976.

It is a non-profit umbrella group and network of around 50 organisations. It publishes ecolink (ISSN 1174-0671), a quarterly newsletter sent out to members and supporters.

It was registered as a charity in 2009, but registration lapsed in 2023.

== Member organisations ==
- Action for Environment Inc.
- Appropriate Technology for Living Association
- Bay of Islands Coastal Watchdog
- Bay of Islands Maritime Park
- Baywatch Hawkes Bay Environment Group
- Buller Conservation Group
- Civic Trust Auckland
- Clean Stream Waiheke
- Conscious Consumers
- Coromandel Watchdog of Hauraki
- Cycling Action Network
- East Harbour Environmental Association
- Eastern Bay of Islands Preservation Society
- EcoMatters Environment Trust
- Engineers for Social Responsibility
- Environmental Futures
- Forest & Bird
- Friends of Golden Bay
- Friends of Lewis Pass and Hurunui Catchment
- Friends of Nelson Haven and Tasman Bay
- Friends of the Earth - NZ
- Gecko - Victoria University Environment Group
- Greenpeace Aotearoa New Zealand
- Guardians of Pauatahanui Inlet
- Initial Volco Trust
- Island Bay Marine Education Centre
- Kaipatiki Project
- Marlborough Environment Centre INC
- Monarch Butterfly NZ Trust
- National Council of Women of NZ
- Nelson Environment Centre
- North Canterbury branch Forest & Bird
- Orari River Protection Group (Inc)
- Organics Aotearoa New Zealand
- Pacific Institute of Resource Management
- RESPONSE Trust
- Sandy Walker Group
- Save the Otago Peninsula
- Soil & Health Association of NZ
- South Coast Environment Society
- Students for Environmental Action
- Surfbreak Protection Society
- Sustainable Whanganui Trust
- Te Aroha Earthwatch
- Thames Coast Preservation and Protection Society
- Wellington Botanical Society INC
- Wellington Tramping and Mountaineering Club
- West Coast Environment Network
- Whaingaroa Environment Centre
- Wildlife Society, NZVA
- Yellow Eyed Penguin Trust

ECO also has around 500 'Friends', made up of individuals and other groups. ECO relies on funding from membership, grants and donations.

== See also ==
- List of environmental organizations
