= Don Elder =

New Zealand engineer and businessman

Dr. Donald McGillivray Elder (born November 1958) is a New Zealand engineer and businessman. He was the CEO of the New Zealand state-owned coal miner Solid Energy for more than a decade.

== Biography ==
Don Elder was born in Christchurch, New Zealand, in November 1958. He attended high school at Christ's College and graduated from the University of Canterbury with a degree in engineering. He then gained a Rhodes Scholarship, to go to Oxford University. Later, he moved back to New Zealand and became CEO of Solid Energy.

Elder resigned as CEO of Solid Energy on 4 February 2013, having served as the CEO for 12 years since May 2000.

Elder currently lives in Christchurch, New Zealand.
