= Maramarua =

Locality in Waikato, New Zealand

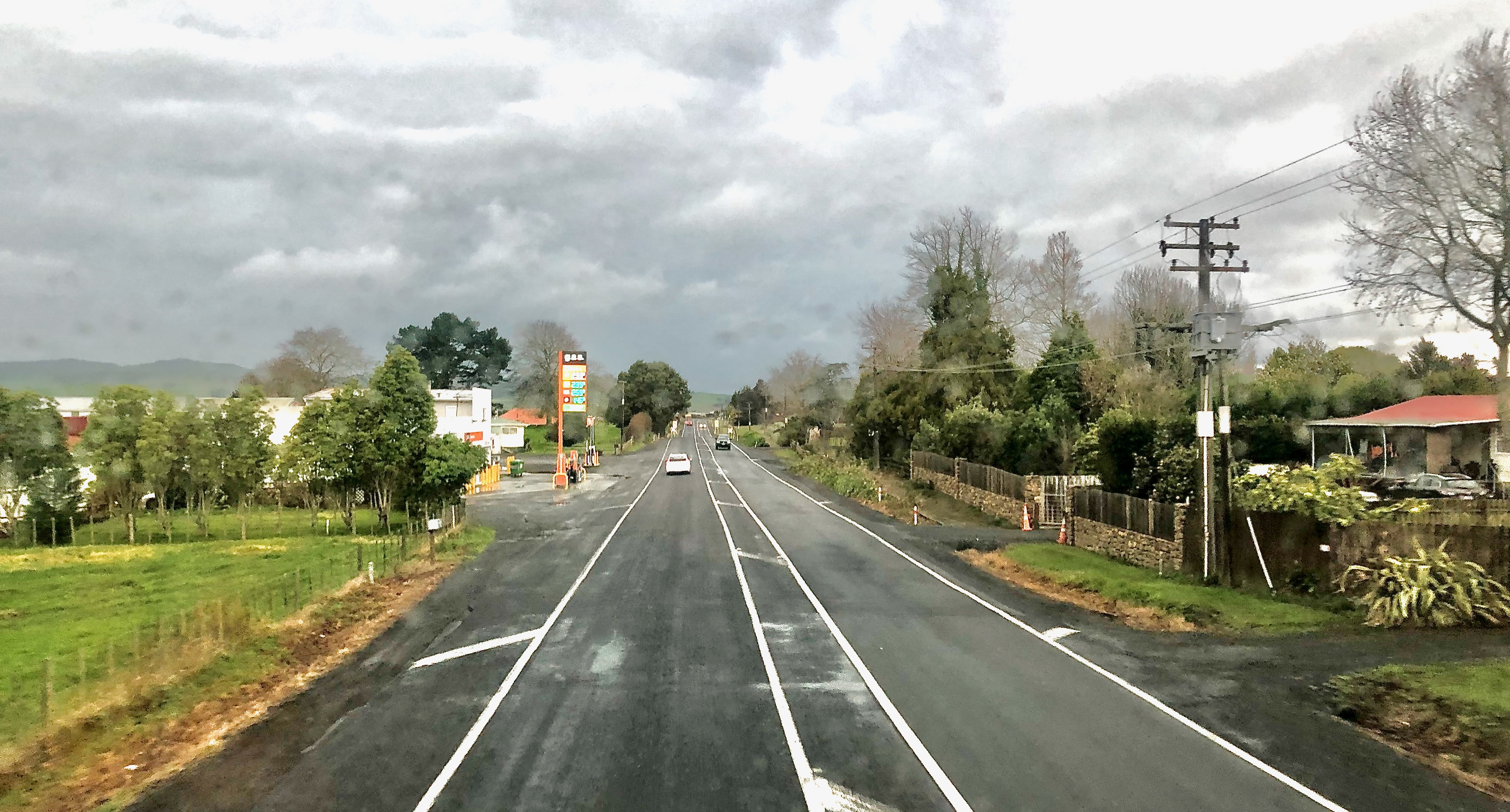
- Maramarua looking east along SH2
- Interactive map of Maramarua
- Coordinates: 37°15′S 175°14′E
- Country: New Zealand
- Region: Waikato
- District: Waikato District
- Wards: Awaroa-Maramarua General Ward; Tai Raro Takiwaa Maaori Ward
- Electorates: Port Waikato; Papakura; Hauraki-Waikato (Māori)

Government
  - Territorial Authority: Waikato District Council
  - Regional council: Waikato Regional Council
  - Mayor of Waikato: Aksel Bech
  - Port Waikato and Papakura MPs: Matthew Paul and Emma Chatterton
  - Hauraki-Waikato MP: Hana-Rawhiti Maipi-Clarke

Area
  - Total: 50.55 km^{2} (19.52 sq mi)

Population (2023 Census)
  - Total: 315
  - Density: 6.23/km^{2} (16.1/sq mi)

Maramarua is a locality in the north-eastern part of the Waikato District of New Zealand. State Highway 2 runs through the settlement.

== Demographics ==
Maramarua settlement is in two SA1 statistical areas which cover 50.55 km^{2} (19.52 sq mi). The SA1 areas are part of the larger Maramarua statistical area.

Historical population for Maramarua settlement
Year	Pop.	±% p.a.
2006	288	—
2013	294	+0.29%
2018	330	+2.34%
2023	315	−0.93%

The settlement had a population of 315 in the 2023 New Zealand census, a decrease of 15 people (−4.5%) since the 2018 census, and an increase of 21 people (7.1%) since the 2013 census. There were 168 males and 147 females in 111 dwellings. 1.0% of people identified as LGBTIQ+. There were 66 people (21.0%) aged under 15 years, 60 (19.0%) aged 15 to 29, 147 (46.7%) aged 30 to 64, and 39 (12.4%) aged 65 or older.

People could identify as more than one ethnicity. The results were 80.0% European (Pākehā); 28.6% Māori; 5.7% Pasifika; 5.7% Asian; and 1.0% Middle Eastern, Latin American and African New Zealanders (MELAA). English was spoken by 95.2%, Māori language by 2.9%, and other languages by 2.9%. No language could be spoken by 1.9% (e.g. too young to talk). New Zealand Sign Language was known by 1.9%. The percentage of people born overseas was 11.4, compared with 28.8% nationally.

Religious affiliations were 19.0% Christian, 2.9% Hindu, 1.9% Māori religious beliefs, 1.0% Buddhist, and 1.0% other religions. People who answered that they had no religion were 64.8%, and 11.4% of people did not answer the census question.

Of those at least 15 years old, 18 (7.2%) people had a bachelor's or higher degree, 135 (54.2%) had a post-high school certificate or diploma, and 87 (34.9%) people exclusively held high school qualifications. 24 people (9.6%) earned over $100,000 compared to 12.1% nationally. The employment status of those at least 15 was that 126 (50.6%) people were employed full-time, 39 (15.7%) were part-time, and 6 (2.4%) were unemployed.

=== Maramarua statistical area ===
Maramarua statistical area, which also includes Meremere, covers 267.64 km^{2} (103.34 sq mi) and had an estimated population of 1,910 as of June 2025, with a population density of 7.1 people per km^{2}.

Historical population of the statistical area
Year	Pop.	±% p.a.
2006	1,413	—
2013	1,479	+0.65%
2018	1,767	+3.62%
2023	1,839	+0.80%

Maramarua statistical area had a population of 1,839 in the 2023 New Zealand census, an increase of 72 people (4.1%) since the 2018 census, and an increase of 360 people (24.3%) since the 2013 census. There were 966 males, 870 females and 3 people of other genders in 615 dwellings. 2.1% of people identified as LGBTIQ+. The median age was 37.3 years (compared with 38.1 years nationally). There were 444 people (24.1%) aged under 15 years, 282 (15.3%) aged 15 to 29, 882 (48.0%) aged 30 to 64, and 231 (12.6%) aged 65 or older.

People could identify as more than one ethnicity. The results were 76.7% European (Pākehā); 28.2% Māori; 9.0% Pasifika; 7.2% Asian; 0.5% Middle Eastern, Latin American and African New Zealanders (MELAA); and 1.3% other, which includes people giving their ethnicity as "New Zealander". English was spoken by 96.4%, Māori language by 4.7%, Samoan by 0.7%, and other languages by 6.4%. No language could be spoken by 2.6% (e.g. too young to talk). New Zealand Sign Language was known by 0.7%. The percentage of people born overseas was 15.3, compared with 28.8% nationally.

Religious affiliations were 24.5% Christian, 1.1% Hindu, 1.1% Islam, 1.8% Māori religious beliefs, 0.3% Buddhist, 0.5% New Age, and 1.3% other religions. People who answered that they had no religion were 60.5%, and 9.1% of people did not answer the census question.

Of those at least 15 years old, 192 (13.8%) people had a bachelor's or higher degree, 816 (58.5%) had a post-high school certificate or diploma, and 384 (27.5%) people exclusively held high school qualifications. The median income was $42,700, compared with $41,500 nationally. 156 people (11.2%) earned over $100,000 compared to 12.1% nationally. The employment status of those at least 15 was that 771 (55.3%) people were employed full-time, 198 (14.2%) were part-time, and 27 (1.9%) were unemployed.

== History ==
In 1913 a launch linked with Mercer via the Maramarua River.

The Kōpako sub-bituminous open cast coal mine was sold by Solid Energy to Bathurst Resources and Talleys in 2016. The 1948 mine restarted production in 2017. It was once linked to Meremere Power Station by an aerial ropeway.

Two prominent New Zealanders have died while driving near Maramarua.

Stephen Allen, a lawyer and local body politician, died of a heart attack in 1964 and in the resulting crash, his housekeeper was also killed. Historian Michael King and his wife died when their car crashed into a tree in 2004.

Publican Chris Bush was shot dead at the Red Fox Tavern in Maramarua on 24 October 1987, shortly before midnight, while he was having a drink with staff. Nearly thirty years later, in 2017, two men were charged with murder and aggravated robbery. Mark Joseph Hoggart and another accomplice, with name suppression, have been found guilty of the murder of Chris Bush, on 29 March 2021. Both men have been sentenced to life imprisonment for the murder of Chris Bush, on 7 May 2021.

== Education ==
Maramarua School is a co-educational state primary school for Year 1 to 8 students, with a roll of 102 as of July 2026. The school opened in 1894.

== Climate ==
Climate data for Maramarua Forest (1981–2010)
Month	Jan	Feb	Mar	Apr	May	Jun	Jul	Aug	Sep	Oct	Nov	Dec	Year
Mean daily maximum °C (°F)	24.0 (75.2)	24.4 (75.9)	22.8 (73.0)	19.9 (67.8)	17.1 (62.8)	14.7 (58.5)	14.0 (57.2)	14.8 (58.6)	16.4 (61.5)	17.9 (64.2)	20.0 (68.0)	22.3 (72.1)	19.0 (66.2)
Daily mean °C (°F)	18.2 (64.8)	18.6 (65.5)	17.0 (62.6)	14.1 (57.4)	11.8 (53.2)	9.6 (49.3)	8.8 (47.8)	9.8 (49.6)	11.4 (52.5)	12.9 (55.2)	14.7 (58.5)	16.7 (62.1)	13.6 (56.5)
Mean daily minimum °C (°F)	12.5 (54.5)	12.9 (55.2)	11.3 (52.3)	8.4 (47.1)	6.5 (43.7)	4.5 (40.1)	3.5 (38.3)	4.8 (40.6)	6.3 (43.3)	7.8 (46.0)	9.4 (48.9)	11.2 (52.2)	8.3 (46.9)
Average rainfall mm (inches)	92.3 (3.63)	75.1 (2.96)	94.3 (3.71)	75.0 (2.95)	97.4 (3.83)	93.8 (3.69)	100.3 (3.95)	137.4 (5.41)	91.7 (3.61)	91.1 (3.59)	95.3 (3.75)	107.0 (4.21)	1,150.7 (45.29)
Source: NIWA
