= Rotowaro =

Historic locality in New Zealand

Coordinates: 37°35′11″S 175°5′35″E

- Location within New Zealand
- Country: New Zealand
- Region: Waikato
- District: Waikato District
- Time zone: UTC+12:00 (CET)
  - Summer (DST): UTC+13:00 (CEST)

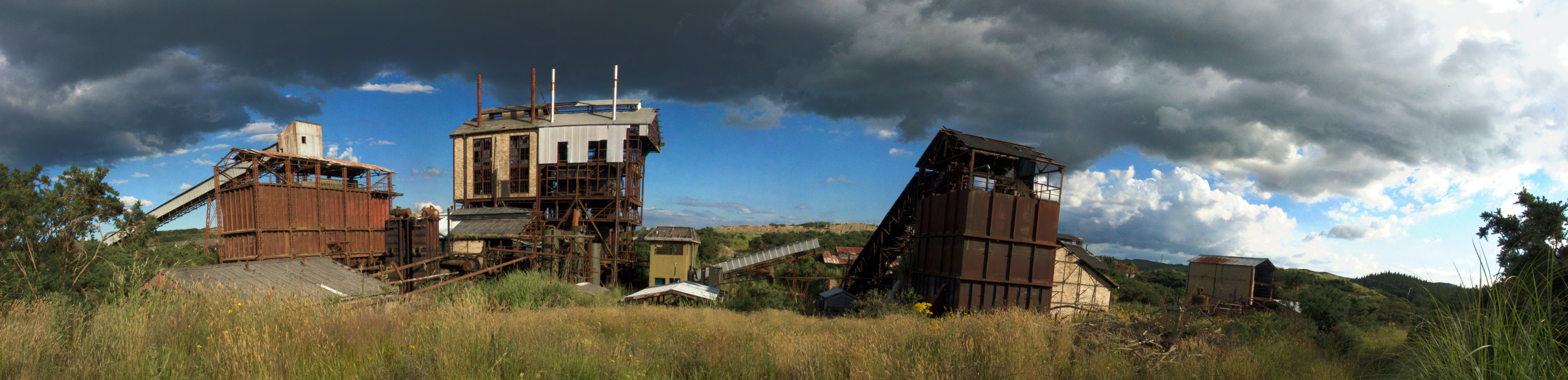
Rotowaro

Rotowaro was once a small coal mining township approximately 10 km west of Huntly in the Waikato region of New Zealand. The town was built especially for miners houses, but was entirely removed in the 1980s to make way for a large opencast mine.

The New Zealand Ministry for Culture and Heritage gives a translation of "lake of glowing embers" for Rotowaro.

== History ==
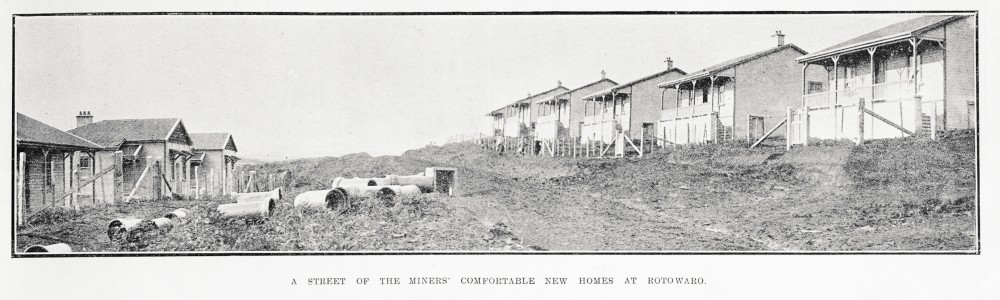
The newly built village in 1920, now replaced by an opencast mine

Mining by Taupiri Coal Co began in Rotowaro around 1915 after a railway to the area and a bridge over the Waikato River were completed. In 1928 it was producing 11,000 tons of coal a month.

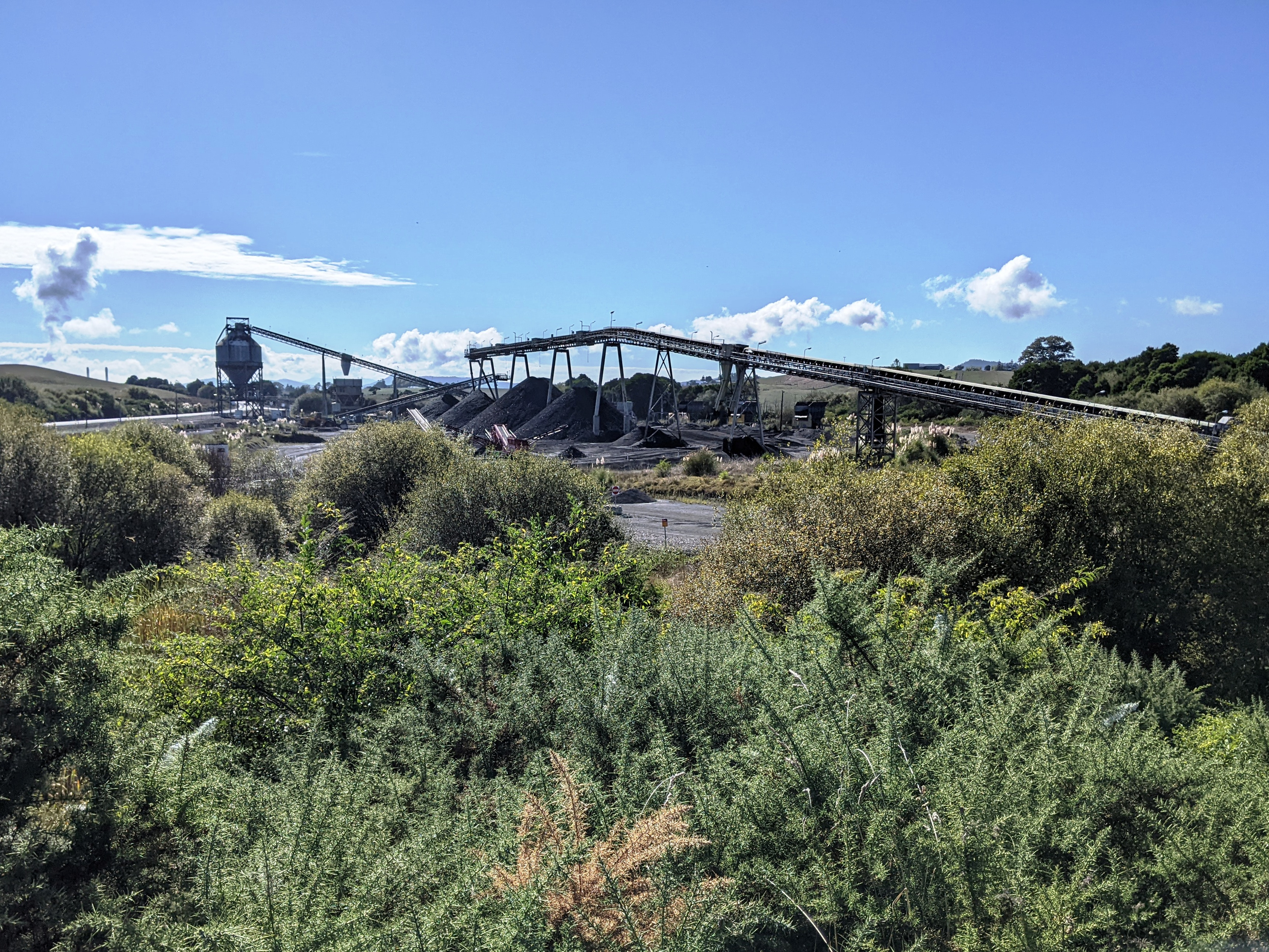
Coal stockpiles at the rail loading facility

The current open cast working and the much smaller O'Reilly's, Puke Coal and Maramarua are the only remaining mines in the Waikato coalfield. It opened in 1958 and produces about 700,000 tonnes a year to make steel at Glenbrook and for limeworks, meat works, timber processing, light industry and horticulture. It was sold by Solid Energy to Bathurst Resources and Talleys in 2016.

The Rotowaro Class A train station was opened on the Huntly-Awaroa railway on 11 February 1918 (or 7 January) and closed to passengers on 26 June 1972 and to goods on 12 August 1997.

The Central Electric Power Board extended electricity to Rotowaro in 1928.

A hall was built in Rotowaro during the 1920s and opened by Rev H G Gilbert on 28 April 1929. The Royal Antediluvian Order of Buffaloes NZ Constitution of the Grand Lodge of England once had a lodge in Rotowaro, the aptly named Rotowaro Lodge No. 106 which at one point owned its own Lodge Hall in Rotowaro. The Lodge relocated to Ngāruawāhia in the 1980s but has long since ceased to operate. The formation of the Buffaloes lodge in Rotowaro was preceded by the establishment of other Fraternal Orders in Rotowaro such as the Oddfellows.

In the late 1960s Floyd Cox set up a pioneer Private Radio Station in Rotowaro, broadcasting out to surrounding areas.

Rotowaro's association football team was one of the strongest clubs in the Waikato Region in the 1920s and 1930s, reaching later rounds of the Chatham Cup on several occasions. Their best performance was reaching the national last eight in the 1927 competition, when they were beaten 4–0 by eventual champions Ponsonby.

== See also ==
- Rotowaro Carbonisation Plant
