= Save Happy Valley Coalition =

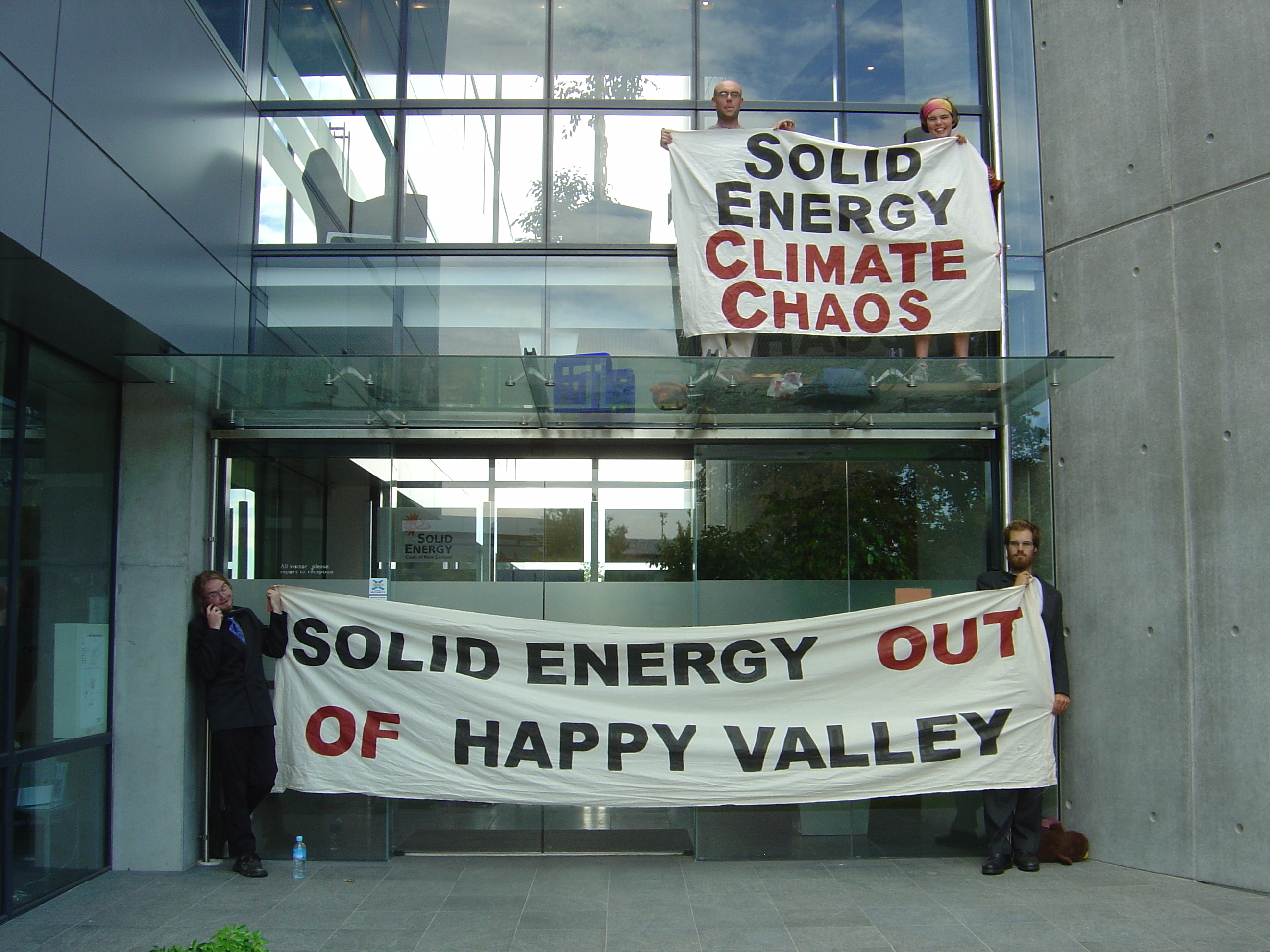
A protest action carried out by SHVC at the head office of Solid Energy in 2005

The Save Happy Valley Coalition (SHVC) is an environmental activist movement formed with the express purpose of preventing the Cypress mine, an open cast coal mine on the West Coast of New Zealand, from proceeding.

The Coalition is a member of the environmental umbrella group Environment and Conservation Organisations of Aotearoa New Zealand.

Individuals previously involved in the Save Happy Valley Coalition have continued their work in groups such as Coal Action Network Aotearoa and the Biodiversity Defence Society.

== History ==
In 2004, Solid Energy, a New Zealand State owned enterprise, applied for resource consents under the Resource Management Act for the Cypress Mine, a proposed open-cast coal mine. The consents were granted by the Buller District Council and the West Coast Regional Council. The Buller Conservation Group, Forest and Bird and Te Runanga O Ngati Waewae, and the Department of Conservation appealed the consent decision to the Environment Court. The appeal was declined and the resource consents confirmed in a decision issued on 24 May 2005.

Jon Oosterman, a spokesperson for the campaign, vowed publicly that a direct action campaign would proceed to halt the mine. The Forest and Bird appealed the decision in the High Court, and in December 2005, the High Court dismissed the appeal.

The campaign involved organising public meetings to raise awareness, postcard and letter writing, lobbying, occupying the head office of the Solid Energy, scaling a four-story building and blockading Solid Energy's coal trains. Members occupied an area adjacent to the proposed mine site.

The SHVC Save Happy Valley! Worth more than its weight in coal! leaflet describes the area as:

Happy Valley, in the Upper Waimangaroa, near Westport, is a stunning, wild and untouched landscape – home to 30 great spotted kiwi/roa and the rare Powelliphanta patrickensis snail. Eleven other endangered birds and animals inhabit this enclave of diversity. Happy Valley is a colourful mosaic of magnificent red tussock wetlands, low forests of lush mountain beech and dense mats of intricate herbfield plants scattered over striking sandstone rocks and bluffs.

The proposed mine site is located at Happy Valley which is an unofficial locally used name for an area to the east of Waimangaroa. It is 25 kilometres north east of Westport. Reasons for the opposition to the mine include acid mine drainage, loss of kiwi, Powelliphanta snail and tussock habitat, and climate change due to the burning of the extracted coal.

At the nearby Mt Augustus, Solid Energy has pushed another 'absolutely protected' endemic snail species to the brink of extinction, and plan to mine its last remaining 4ha of habitat. Forest and Bird obtained a declaration in December 2005 that Solid Energy needed permission from the Ministers of Energy and Conservation to translocate the snails before mining. This permission was granted in April 2006.

The Save Happy Valley Coalition released a press statement stating they were 'appalled' at the decision. A spokesperson stated that it was 'New Zealand's first state-sponsored species extinction' and that Chris Carter, the Minister of Conservation at that time, had bowed to pressure from Solid Energy and had ignored consistent advice from the Department of Conservation.

The Save Happy Valley Coalition Inc has since taken Solid Energy to the High Court, and sought a Judicial Review of the Ministers' decision. In March 2007, the High Court did not uphold the review and it awarded costs of $5760 to Solid Energy.

In 2007 individuals involved with the Save Happy Valley Coalition were targeted in a series of contentious anti-terror raids.

In October 2012 Solid Energy announced that work on the proposed mine at Happy Valley would be delayed.

On 12 June 2013, The Biodiversity Defence Society filed proceedings with the Environment Court, arguing that Solid Energy no longer holds resource consents for its proposed mine at Happy Valley, due to the expiry of the allocated time period of the consent. In 2014 much of the targeted area was bulldozed in order to make way for mining despite the low price of coal and low return on investment.

== Surveillance ==
In April 2008, the Sunday Star Times reported that Gavin Clark of the Auckland private investigation company, Thompson and Clark Investigations (TCIL), had offered a Christchurch man, Rob Gilchrist, $500 a week to inform on the Save Happy Valley Campaign, for the benefit of the state-owned coal company Solid Energy. In December of the same year Gilchrist was revealed to be a police informant and had infiltrated a number of activist organisations, including SHVC.

== See also ==
- Environment of New Zealand
- Mining in New Zealand
