= Strongman Mine =

Underground coal mine north of Greymouth, New Zealand

Coordinates: 42.343225°S 171.305399°E

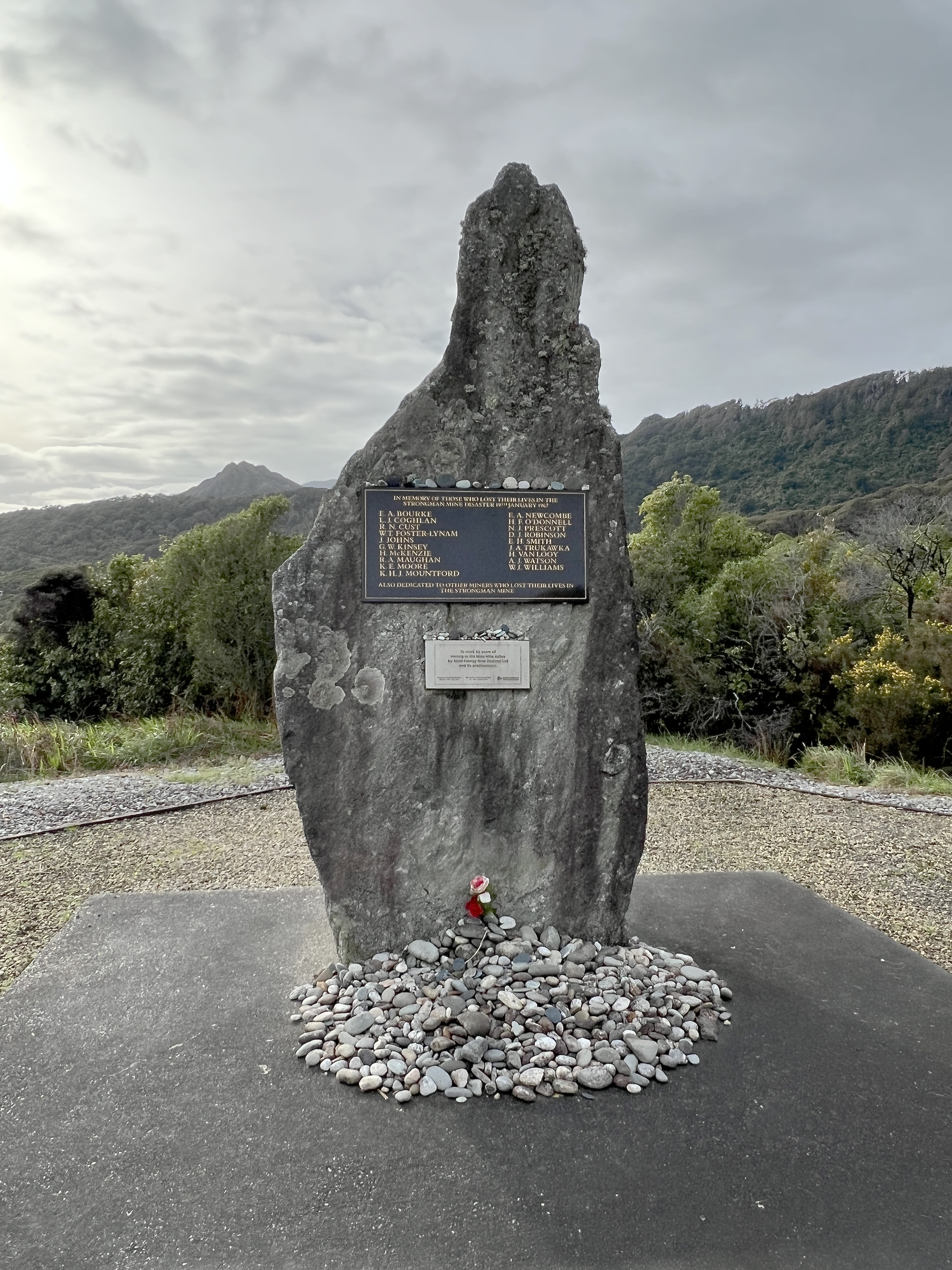
The Strongman Mine memorial on State Highway 6

The Strongman Mine was an underground coal mine north of Greymouth on the West Coast of New Zealand from 1938 to 2003.

On 19 January 1967, a gas explosion in the mine killed 19 miners.

In 1994, the original mine was replaced by the Strongman 2 mine further up the Nine Mile valley. The Strongman 2 mine closed in 2003.

== See also ==
- Mining in New Zealand
- Mining accident
- Brunner Mine disaster
- Pike River Mine disaster
