= Coromandel Watchdog =

Environmental organisation in New Zealand

Coromandel Watchdog of Hauraki
- Founded: 1970s
- Type: Environmental organization
- Purpose: Environmental protection; opposition to mining
- Headquarters: Coromandel Peninsula, New Zealand
- Region served: New Zealand
- Website: watchdog.org.nz

Coromandel Watchdog of Hauraki is an environmental organisation lobbying in opposition to mining on the Coromandel Peninsula in New Zealand.

The Coromandel Peninsula is an area of high scenic values due to the presence of the original forest cover and a coastline that is popular for recreation. Goldmining has been carried out since the late 19th century. To the south of the peninsula the Martha Mine at Waihi is still operating.

Coromandel Watchdog began protests and lobbying in the 1970s against the activities of mining companies. It was instrumental in having conservation land on the Coromandel Peninsula protected under Schedule 4 of the Crown Minerals Act.

In 2009, Watchdog was reactivated after a period of inactivity. The National-led Government was proposing the removal of up to 2,500 hectares (6,200 acres) of Coromandel land from Schedule 4. Coromandel Watchdog publicly stated that they would fight the proposal. In 2010 the government confirmed that no land would be removed from Schedule 4.

In 2020 the group opposed an underground gold mine proposed by OceanaGold in the Wharekirauponga bush. The area is home to the critically-endangered Archey's frog. Also in 2020 the group brought a judicial review of a decision to grant permission for OceanaGold to expand mining operations near Waihi, however they lost and were ordered to pay costs.

== See also ==
- Environment of New Zealand
- Mining in New Zealand
- Coromandel Gold Rush
