= Martha Mine =

Gold mine in New Zealand

Coordinates: 37.385868°S 175.842705°E

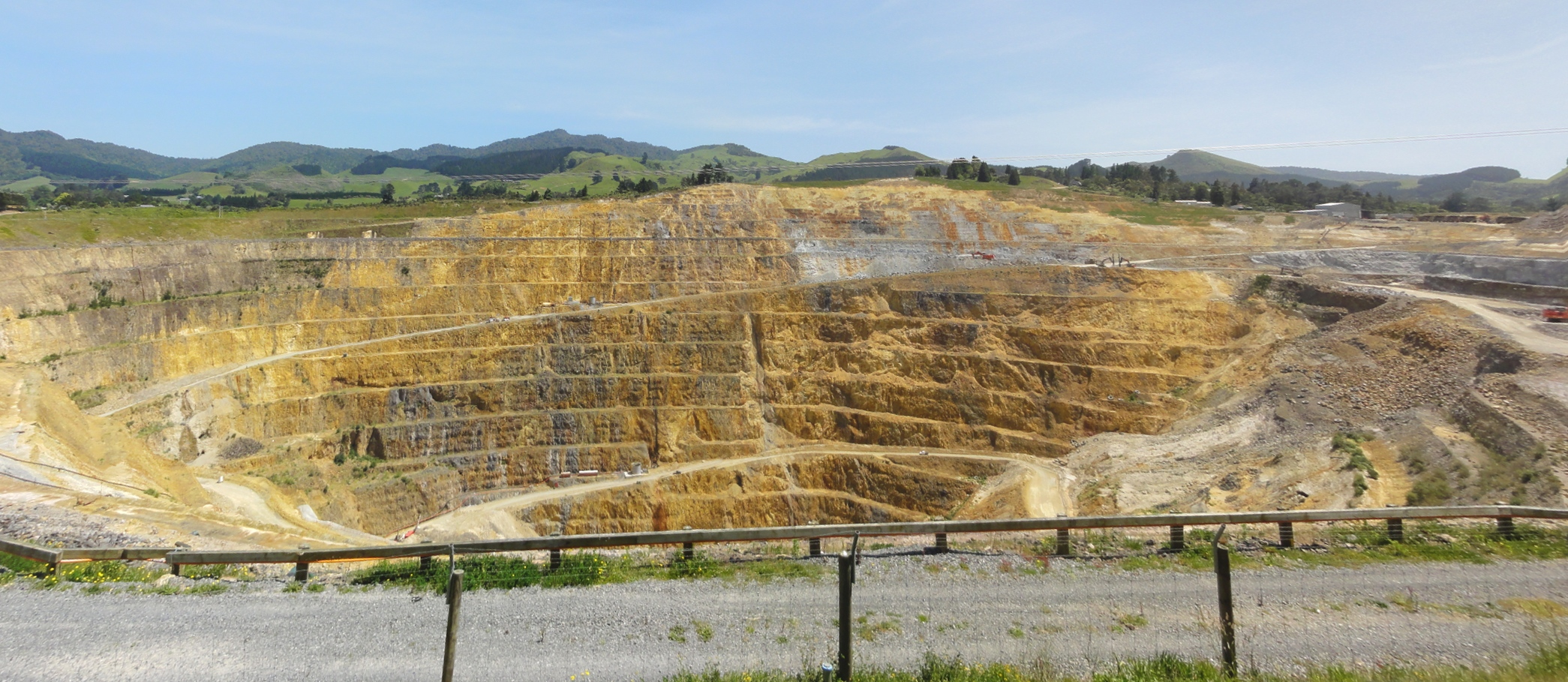
Martha open-cast mine, slips on the right

The Martha Mine is a gold mine in the New Zealand town of Waihi. Since July 2015 it has been owned by OceanaGold.

== History ==
William Nicholl marked out a 5 acres (20,000 m^{2}) claim, calling it "Martha" after a family member. Several smaller claims were later merged to form the Martha Company. By 1882 the first battery to break gold-bearing rock was in operation. The Martha Mine eventually grew into one of the world's most important gold and silver mines, after industrial cyanide processes made recovering gold from the low-grade ores easier. Waihi prospered with the mine, by 1908 being the fastest-growing town in the Auckland Province, three times the size of Hamilton.

In 1935 New Zealand gold output peaked during the depression, with two-thirds by the Waihi Company which was the largest of the four major companies. That year for tax reasons the Waihi Company was split into three, including the Martha Company which controlled the Martha Mine.

By the 1950s the mine was struggling due to a series of factors. Chief among those was the international gold price, which was fixed at $US35 an ounce, limiting the revenue the mine could make. Other factors included the need for a substantial capital expenditure to update the machinery. Although the technology was available to do this, the money was not. Manpower issues also factored into the decision to close the underground mine. There had been two World Wars and the Depression of the 1930s, depleting manpower and creating a difficult economic climate. These led to the underground mine closing in 1952.

=== The open-cast mine ===
In the 1970s and early 1980s the gold price increased. Exploration and prospecting work identified ore that could be profitably exploited through a lower cost "open pit" or open-cast approach. The mine was reopened as an open pit in 1988.

In April 2015 and April 2016, large landslides occurred and stopped mining activities.

In March 2018 OceanaGold announced "Project Martha", part of which was to re-instate the pit haul road to allow mining to restart.

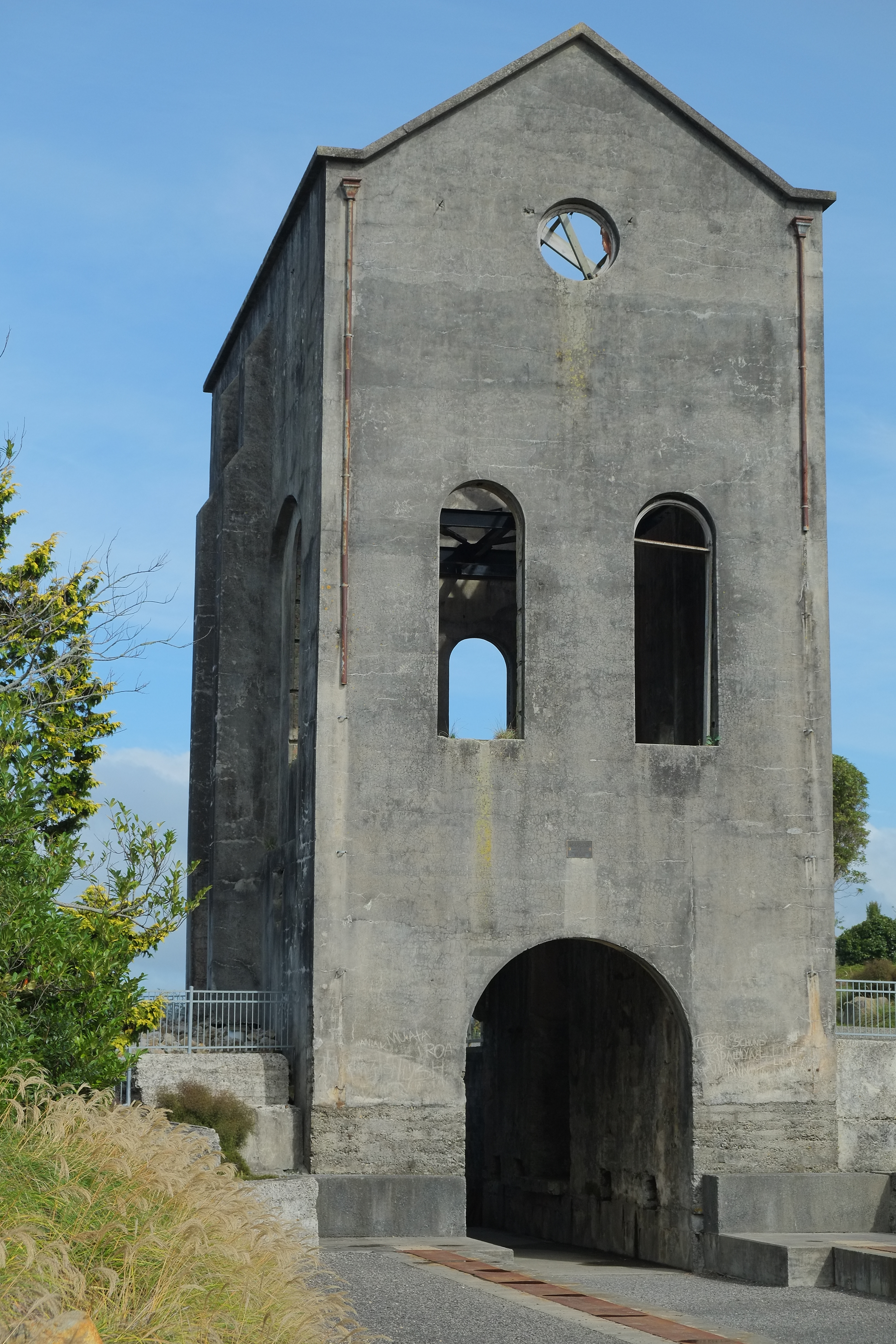
Cornish Pumphouse in its present location

=== Cornish Pumphouse ===
The "Cornish Pumphouse" was originally built in a different location next to the Martha Mine in 1904 to accommodate a large Cornish steam engine designed to pump water out of the mine. The building's design originated from one used in tin mines in Cornwall, England.

The horizontal Cornish pump was used up to 1913 to raise water from a depth of around 400 metres (1,300 ft) via the adjacent No 5 shaft at a rate of over 400,000 litres per hour. After 1913, electric pumps were used to dewater the mine, but the pumphose was kept in working order until 1929 as a backup.

From the 1930s onwards, the building had been stripped of all machinery and left in an increasingly derelict state. In 1983, the building was registered as a Historic Place Category 1 with the New Zealand Historic Places Trust due to its historical importance as one of the country's principal industrial monuments.

In 2001, the area surrounding the pumphouse was fenced off, following subsidence in nearby Barry Road. Investigations reached the conclusion that the only way to protect the building was to relocate it to a safer site. The operation to move the Cornish Pumphouse to a site 300 metres (980 ft) away was started in 2006 with the installation of internal steel bracing and the building of a relocation causeway. Later in the year, the building, weighing 1,840 tonnes, was moved over the course of three months along teflon-coated concrete beams to its present location, which is easily accessible via a footpath from Seddon Street.

Some internal steel bracing remains installed in the building and it is able to be viewed by the public during daylight hours.

=== Other current underground mining ===
Starting in 2004, a series of underground mines all accessed via one entrance, the Favona portal, have been developed. These mines, (Favona, Trio and Correnso) run under much of the town of Waihi - and produce approximately 100,000 ounces of gold each year.

== Production ==
From the 1880s to 1952 the Martha Mine was an underground mine. The mine became one of the most important gold and silver mines in the world. By 1952, when the mine closed, around 5.6 million ounces (174,160 kg) of gold and 38.4 million ounces (1,193,180 kg) of silver had been produced from 11,932,000 tonnes of ore. The modern Martha Mine has operated as an open pit since 1987. An average of around 100,000 ounces of gold and 700,000 ounces of silver have been produced annually since 1988.

== Issues ==
Some environmental protests occurred during the 1987 consenting process for further mine operations. In 2001, subsidence in the area caused a collapse of a house, and the operating company agreed to pay compensation to about 130 households for various negative effects due to noise, blast vibrations and dust.

== See also ==
- Mining in New Zealand
- Coromandel Watchdog
