= Bathurst Resources =

New Zealand coal mining company

Bathurst Resources, along with a number of subsidiaries, is a coal mining company in New Zealand that was established in 2010.

== History ==
The company was originally based in Perth, Western Australia, and incorporated on 30 May 2007, listing on the Australian Securities Exchange (ASX) on 19 December 2007. The company's purpose at the time was to develop its interest in the Mt Clifford nickel, base metals and gold exploration project, in WA. In October 2008 it withdrew from this project, and instead acquired a coal producer in Kentucky, US. By November 2009 Bathurst Resources ceased producing coal from Eastern Kentucky LLC, on the return of this company to its original owners.

As a result, Bathurst Resources carried out a strategic realignment in early 2010, with a view to producing coal in New Zealand.

Bathurst Resources Limited was incorporated in New Zealand on 16 November 2010. The name of this company was changed to BR Coal Pty Ltd on 6 December 2013, with Pier Westerhuis as its sole director. Bathurst Resources (New Zealand) Limited was incorporated on 27 March 2013 and changed its names to Bathurst Resources Limited on 18 December 2013. This company has four directors, including Westerhuis. Another director is Richard Tacon, who has since March 2015 been the CEO of Bathurst Resources. Tacon is the chairperson of the Coal Association of New Zealand.

In November 2010, Bathurst Resources listed on the NZX (New Zealand's Exchange), in addition to its ASX listing. With falling coal prices due to the 2008 financial crisis, the company delisted from the NZX on 3 July 2015 as a cost saving measure. Bathurst Resources is majority-owned by Singaporean interests.

Among reasons for Bathurst Resources' entrance to New Zealand was the Escarpment Mine Project on the Denniston Plateau. In March 2010, the Perth-based coal company Bathurst Resources announced it was buying L&M Coal's hard-coking coal exploration assets and mining permit areas in the Buller District of the West Coast. In June 2010, Bathurst Resources announced plans to develop an opencast coking and thermal coal mine for exporting in 2011 in a joint venture with Christchurch-based company L&M. The proposal had an exploration target of between 17 and 23 million tonnes of coal in the Denniston area. In early September 2010, Bathurst Resources confirmed plans for a US$57 million hard coking coal opencast mine on the Denniston plateau above Westport. The plan included a slurry pipeline to carry coal down the steep plateau slope from a processing plant to a rail load-out 10 kilometres (6.2 mi) from Westport. The plans for a pipeline were dropped in 2012 and an aerial transport system agreed to instead to address objections made by residents of Fairdown.

L&M Coal Limited became Buller Coal Holdings Limited on 9 November 2010, and the name was further amended to Buller Coal Limited on 28 February 2011. Buller Coal Limited, fully owned by Bathurst New Zealand Limited which in turn is fully owned by Bathurst Resources Limited, was in charge of the Escarpment Mine Project.

== Leadership ==
Hamish Bohannan was the company's managing director from late 2008, and its first CEO. He resigned in March 2015. Richard Tacon, who was the company's COO and had joined in 2012, succeeded Bohannan. Tacon became a director of the company on 1 April 2015. Tacon remains the company's CEO.

Bathurst Resources' governance stepped up in the year to 30 June 2018 with the addition of sustainability reporting to the annual report. Materiality topics for reporting chosen at that time were: stakeholder engagement, economic performance and responsibility, health and safety, water management, land use and biodiversity, energy and carbon dioxide emissions, overburden management, regulatory compliance, mine closure plans, and emergency preparedness. The company draws on the Global Reporting Initiative as a guide to reporting metrics and sustainability disclosures.

== Operations ==
The company started operating in New Zealand in March 2011, on the acquisition of Eastern Resources with the head office located from March 2012 in Wellington. It operated small mines in Westland and Southland while waiting for the much larger Escarpment Mine Project to get consented, and once consent was achieved in 2013, for resource prices to recover to make extraction economic. In 2014, Bathurst Resources wrote off the $449.9 million value of the Escarpment Mine Project. The six-month revenue of the mines in Westland and Southland was reported as $26.5 million at the end of 2014. Bathurst suspended mining at the Escarpment site in 2016, in response to the closure in June that year of the Holcim cement works at Cape Foulwind, its main customer for the 35,000 tonnes of coal produced annually at the Escarpment mine. There had also been a sharp decline in the global prices for hard coking coal between 2008 and 2015, making production at the site uneconomic.

The Takitimu Mine, also known as the Nightcaps mine, was operated as an open-cast mine by Bathurst Resources from 2011. From 2011, the company was operating to adjacent Coaldale Mine. The Coaldale Mine was then expanded into the adjacent Black Diamond deposit.

In 2017 Bathurst resources formed a joint-venture with Talley's Energy (BT Mining Ltd) to acquire assets of the former state-owned coal miner Solid Energy Ltd. By 2018 Bathurst Resources became New Zealand's largest coal mining company, with mines at Maramarua, Rotowaro, and Stockton added to its portfolio.

In FY18 Bathurst Resources expanded its interests offshore of New Zealand with an equity investment in the Crown Mountain coking coal project in British Columbia, Canada. Two years later this equity stake reached 22%, and in FY22, production at Crown Mountain was forecast to begin from 2026, subject to all regulatory approvals being obtained.
