= Cypress Mine =

Coal mine in New Zealand

Coordinates: 41.7015°S 171.8885°E

The Cypress Mine is in the West Coast Region.

The Cypress Mine is an extension to the open-cast coal mine the Stockton Mine's operational area, to the east into the Upper Waimangaroa Mining Permit area, on the West Coast of New Zealand. The mine commenced operation in 2014.

In 2005, Solid Energy, a state-owned enterprise owned by the New Zealand government, was granted resource consent for the mine after an unsuccessful appeal to the Environment Court.

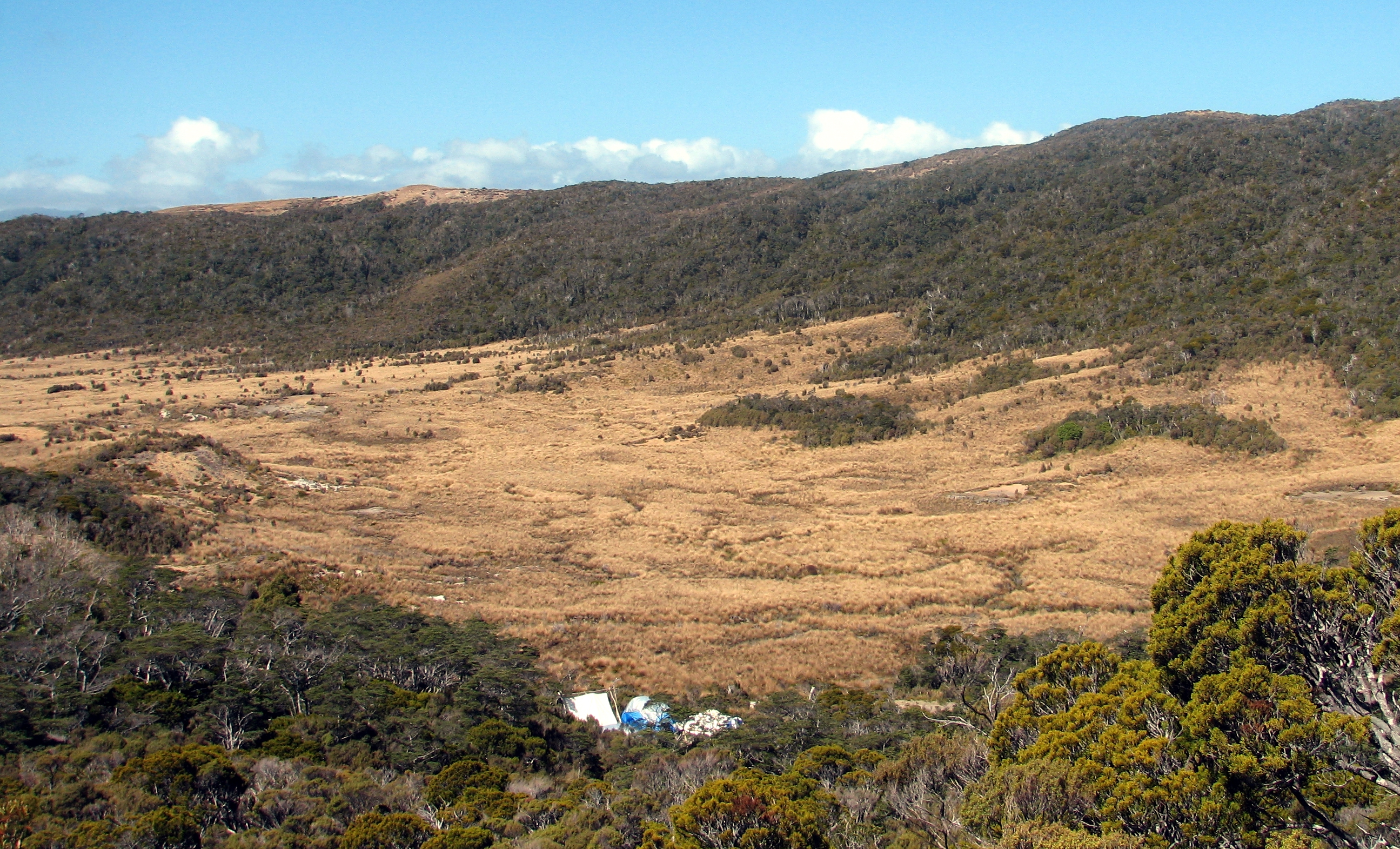
A view of part of Cypress Mine site. The SHVC occupation camp is in the foreground.

Save Happy Valley Coalition (SHVC), an environmental organisation, opposed the mine and occupied land adjacent to the proposed mine site for two years. SHVC argued that the mine would cause acid mine drainage, destruction of endangered species habitats, and 12 to 14 million tonnes of CO_{2} emissions, contributing to climate change.

Solid Energy's Environmental Report 2007 mentioned that the mine was scheduled to start in 2008. However, in 2010, Solid Energy updated that the mine's development would start that year and anticipated that the first coal would be expected to be taken by late 2011.

In October 2012 Solid Energy announced that work on the mine would be delayed.

On 12 June 2013, The Biodiversity Defence Society filed proceedings with the Environment Court, arguing that Solid Energy no longer holds resource consents for its Cypress Mine, due to the expiry of the allocated time period of the consent.
