= Solid Energy =

New Zealand coal mining company

- Type: State owned enterprise
- Industry: mining, coal
- Founded: 1987, Wellington
- Defunct: 16 March 2018
- Headquarters: Christchurch, New Zealand
- Key people: Andy Coupe, Chair
- Products: Coal, renewable energy fuels
- Revenue: $370 million NZD (2015)
- Number of employees: 589

Solid Energy was the largest coal mining company in New Zealand and is a state owned enterprise of the New Zealand Government.

The company was formed from the former government department State Coal Mines. It was then established as a state owned enterprise called Coal Corporation in 1987 (known as Coalcorp), and renamed Solid Energy New Zealand Limited in 1997. In 2015, it had a turnover of NZ$369.8 million and produced 2.8 million tonnes of coal.

The company mined extensively in New Zealand's Waikato and the West Coast regions. Approximately half the coal mined was exported, as it was high value with little moisture, sulphur, or other impurities. Much of this was to China, India and Japan where it was used in the power generation and coke industries and for the manufacture of steel and other metals. Major domestic users included the Huntly Power Station and New Zealand Steel at Glenbrook.

Solid Energy went into voluntary administration in August 2015. On 31 October 2016 it was announced that the company's assets had been sold to three separate buyers. On 16 March 2018 the company was put into liquidation.

== Coal operations ==
Solid Energy produced approximately 85% of New Zealand's coal annually. Each year it produced around 4 million tonnes, more than half of it for export.

Solid Energy Mines
Mine	Location	Type	Reserves, kt	Production, kt pa
Huntly East	Waikato	Underground	7,000	100
Rotowaro	Waikato	Opencast	14,000	1200
Stockton	West Coast	Opencast	16,000	
Spring Creek	West Coast	Underground	18,000	mothballed
Terrace	West Coast	Underground	700	nil
Strongman	West Coast	Underground		closed
Reddale Mine	West Coast	Opencast		140
New Vale	Southland	Opencast		250
Ohai	Southland	Opencast	2,000	

Solid Energy had proposed opening two further mines: the Cypress Mine and the Mt William North Mining Project.

In 2006, Solid Energy bought Newvale Coal Co Limited and acquired the Newvale opencast mine, located in the Waimumu coal field in Southland. The Newvale mine supplies lignite to the domestic market, including to Fonterra's Edendale dairy plant. In December 2010 the Terrace mine near Reefton, which had closed in 2009, was sold to Crusader Coal. In October 2011 Solid Energy opened the small opencast Reddale Mine near Reefton on the West Coast.

== Retrenchment 2011 to 2015 ==
In March 2012, Solid Energy purchased Pike River Coal, which had gone into receivership after the Pike River Mine disaster of 2010. The sale was completed in May. There has been criticism because Solid Energy decided in 2014 that it was too risky to re-enter the mine to recover any remains from the mine. The government subsequently purchased the 3580 ha of land around the Pike River Mine. The environment minister Nick Smith announced on 15 November 2015 that the 3580 ha of land is to be added to the Paparoa National Park, and a 45 km walkway, the Pike 29 Memorial Track from Blackball to Punakaikai through the park constructed as a memorial to the 29 miners lost in the disaster.

In mid-August 2012, the chief executive, Don Elder, announced a decline in Solid Energy's revenue of $200 million and a review of its operations. On 25 October 2012, Solid Energy confirmed it was moth-balling the Spring Creek Mine and that 220 miners would be made redundant. Solid Energy's annual report for the financial year ended June 2012 was released in November and showed a loss of $40 million, a decline of 146% from the profit for 2011.

In December 2012, workers at mines owned by Solid Energy were repeatedly rejecting pay cuts and reductions in hours. Solid made 235 employees redundant at the Spring Creek mine, and reduced the workforce at the Christchurch head office by 163 positions, as well as cutting 60 jobs at the Huntly East mine. In January 2013, workers at the Stockton Mine agreed to reduced hours and pay after months of negotiations with owners Solid Energy, who had dis-established several hundred jobs in the previous year.

On 4 February 2013, board Chairman Mark Ford announced that Don Elder had resigned as Chief Executive and that Garry Diack would be the interim CEO until a permanent CEO was appointed. On 22 February 2013, Solid Energy stated that its half-year result would include a further "significant loss" and that its debt had increased to $389 million. Finance Minister Bill English distanced the Government from the state-owned company's woes, saying it would no longer be paying out large bonuses to executives.

In 2011, Solid Energy had valued itself at $3.5 billion, but a later review said that was at least $2 billion too high. A restructuring package in October 2013 gave the company an extra $100 million in equity, with 75% coming from banks and 25% from the New Zealand Government. Another $103 million of equity was supplied by the government in September 2014.

=== Voluntary administration and sale of assets ===
On 13 August 2015 the company went into temporary voluntary administration, asking creditors to freeze most of its debt. If the creditors agree, Solid Energy will sell its assets as going concerns so that it can pay the creditors.

On 31 October 2016 the company announced it had concluded sale and purchase agreements for the majority of its mining assets. Agreements were signed with three different entities:

- Phoenix Coal Limited, a joint venture of Bathurst Resources and Talleys Group, for the Stockton export coal operation, and the two Waikato mines, Rotowaro and Maramarua, which supply for the domestic North Island market;
- Greenbriar, owned by the Palmer MH Group, a privately owned South Island resources group – for the New Vale and Ohai coal mines in Southland;
- Birchfield Coal Mines Limited, a West Coast mining business, for the Strongman and Liverpool mines on the West Coast.

The sales were completed in the first half of 2017.

== Lignite conversion proposals ==
In 2010, Solid Energy was promoting a number of 'lignite conversion' projects. Solid Energy believed that its proposed projects "could unlock the vast potential of Southland’s multi-billion tonne lignite deposits by making them into high value products". In January 2011, Southland Chamber of Commerce chief executive Richard Hay predicted that the full lignite to briquette plant and the lignite to fertiliser plant might employ up to 2,300 people which would transform the fortunes of the town of Mataura.

=== Briquettes ===
One of the projects was to make fuel briquettes from lignite. A pilot briquetting plant was planned for either the former Mataura Mine site, or the former Mataura Paper Mill. In July 2010, Solid Energy reported it had run a successful trial of briquettes with US partner GTL Energy. In June 2011, Gore District Council approved resource consents for the Mataura briquetting plant. By June 2012, construction was under way at a site by State Highway 1, south of Mataura. The briquetting plant was expected to process 148,000 tonnes of low-grade lignite from the New Vale mine into 90,000 tonnes of higher-quality briquettes for fuel. The plant would have had a boiler likely to burn 15,000 tonnes of lignite a year.

=== Fertiliser ===
The other potential lignite-conversion project was to gasify lignite to produce urea-based fertiliser. Solid Energy was considering the viability of a lignite-to-urea plant with the fertiliser company Ravensdown as partner. Solid Energy and Ravensdown initially co-operated over a joint concept study until August 2012 when Ravensdown stated it would no longer be involved.

=== Liquid fuel ===
The other potential lignite-conversion project was to gasify lignite to produce liquid fuels. Solid Energy had an agreement with an Australian company, Ignite Energy Resources Pty Ltd, to develop a lignite-to-liquid plant. The technology involved had not been proved viable at a commercial scale.

=== Implications ===
In December 2010, Dr Jan Wright, the Parliamentary Commissioner for the Environment, issued a report, "Lignite and climate change: The high cost of low grade coal", which criticised the lignite conversion proposals for their carbon intensity, their contribution to climate change and the likelihood that they would be eligible to receive a free allocation of carbon credits under the New Zealand Emissions Trading Scheme. Wright said "it makes no sense that the emissions trading system (ETS) rules would lead to taxpayers subsidising, even at a modest level, new investment in outdated dirty technology".

On 22 February 2013, the New Zealand Herald reported that the plans for converting the Southland lignite into diesel, fertiliser and burnable briquettes has been abandoned due to debts and low coal prices.

== Renewable energy operations ==
Solid Energy had previously invested heavily in the development of renewable energy in New Zealand, but due to the retrenchment begun in mid-2012, significant restructuring occurred. The biodiesel business was divested and now exists as two separate business: Biodiesel New Zealand which manufactures biodiesel, and Pure Oil NZ which manages the agri-business operations.

Switch, the wholesale distributor of wood pellet fires and Apricus solar hot water systems, was absorbed by Nature's Flame, a manufacturer of wood pellet fuel. Nature's Flame was restructured to be a stand-alone business, although was still an asset of Solid Energy. Nature's Flame produces wood pellets for home heating. The company claims that the wood pellets are a sustainable, renewable fuel that burns so efficiently it is virtually smokeless, and that it meets stringent new clean air standards. According to Solid Energy's 2008 Annual Report, Nature's Flame was the largest manufacturer of wood pellets in the Southern Hemisphere. Nature's Flame began in 2003, when Solid Energy purchased a small wood pellet company based at Rolleston.

Solid Energy applied for a resource consent for a hydro-electric power station at its Stockton Mine.

== Opposition groups ==
Concerns were raised about the environmental performance of Solid Energy particularly at the Stockton Mine on the West Coast. In 2006, the Parliamentary Commissioner for the Environment proposed to undertake a review of the environmental performance of the company in 2008.

Solid Energy has also been criticised by the Ngawakau Riverwatch group and environmental groups and organisations such as Greenpeace, Forest and Bird, The Buller Conservation Group and the Save Happy Valley Coalition. The criticisms include carbon emissions, environmental damage and greenwashing in respect of the impacts of mining.

Resource consents were granted to Solid Energy for the development and operation of the Cypress mine on land near Waimangaroa. This was opposed by the environmental group Save Happy Valley Campaign (SHVC). They claimed that the mine would contribute to acid mine drainage, climate change and the possible extinction of a species of Powelliphanta snail.

On 27 May 2007, The Sunday Star-Times reported that Thompson and Clark Investigations Ltd, a security firm employed by Solid Energy, used private individuals to spy on SHVC. A second spying episode was alleged involving Thompson and Clark attempting to employ another spy to obtain information from SHVC. Solid Energy claimed that they had no knowledge of that instance of an attempt by Thompson and Clark to employ a spy.

== See also ==
- Energy in New Zealand
