= Brunner Mine disaster =

1896 mining accident in New Zealand

Coordinates: 42°25′56.5″S 171°19′24.2″E

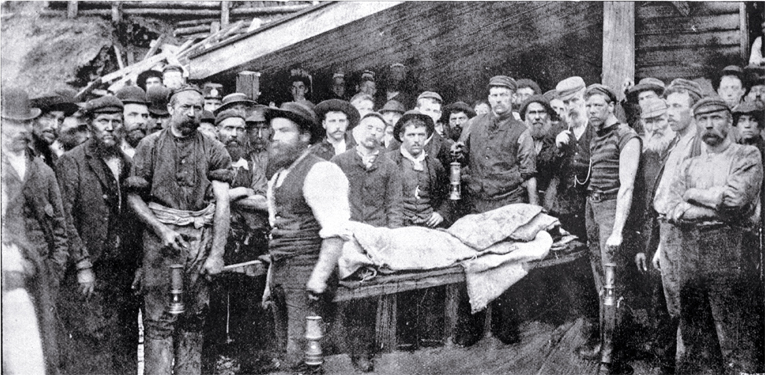
- One of the deceased miners being recovered from the mine
- Date: 26 March 1896
- Time: 9:30 am (NZMT; UTC+11:30)
- Location: Brunner Mine, West Coast, New Zealand
- Deaths: 65

On 26 March 1896, an explosion deep in the Brunner Mine, New Zealand, killed all 65 miners below ground. The Brunner Mine disaster is the deadliest mining disaster in New Zealand's history.

The Royal Commission of Inquiry put the cause of the disaster as a blown-out shot in a part of the mine where miners should not have been working. However, experienced miners claimed the explosion was caused by firedamp igniting, which had accumulated in the mine due to inadequate ventilation.

== Accident and response ==
It is most likely that the explosion was caused by firedamp, a common hazard in coal mines when a pocket of methane gas is accidentally ignited and explodes. Firedamp is all the more hazardous because of the after-effects of the explosion. Gases known as "afterdamp" – carbon dioxide, carbon monoxide and nitrogen produced by the explosion – often prove to be just as deadly and can kill miners unhurt by the explosion itself.

"Joseph Scott, the Blackball Mine Manager.., believed that the majority (of miners) were killed by the explosion and "not more than half a dozen by the afterdamp". Robert Russell, believing the explosion to be caused by firedamp, while acknowledging that the explosion force and coal dust flames contributed to the causes of death, believed that "at the end it was the afterdamp gases that killed them (all)." Dr. James McBrearty's description of many victims frothing at the mouth, suggests asphyxiation by the predominant afterdamp gas, being carbon dioxide. The afterdamp gas carbon monoxide which presented such a problem for the recovery teams must also have contributed to death through poisoning. It was not then fully appreciated that only small quantities of carbon monoxide or white damp could be fatal".

Rescuers entering the mine after the explosion found themselves suffocating on the afterdamp gas and had to return to the surface, often unconscious, carried by other rescuers; however, the determination was such to find the bodies, and to find any survivors, that the rescuers – mostly miners from nearby mines – would insist on returning to the airless mine as soon as they had been revived on the surface. Miners came from as far as Denniston to assist the rescue effort, though it took the Denniston miners several days to arrive as they had to travel by sea from Westport. Wood explains this: "The response of the West Coast miners in volunteering for the rescue parties was due to their occupational loyalties and social and kinship ties. Occupational bonding, especially of coal miners, requires obedience to the miner's code that they come to each other's assistance. Denniston miners and mine managers, like Blackball miners, included former workmates, relatives and friends belonging to the same generation of immigrants, particularly those arriving between 1875 and 1885". According to Wood: "The tragedy helped to break down some old world differences and establish a West Coast identity, especially in the mining community.

== Aftermath ==
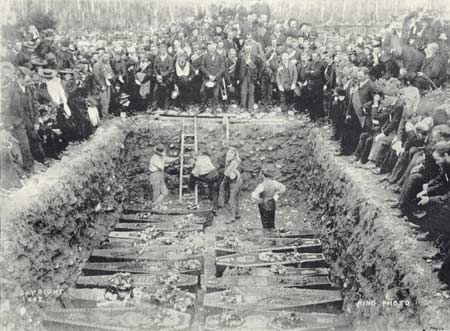
The mass burial of Brunner Mine disaster victims at the Stillwater cemetery

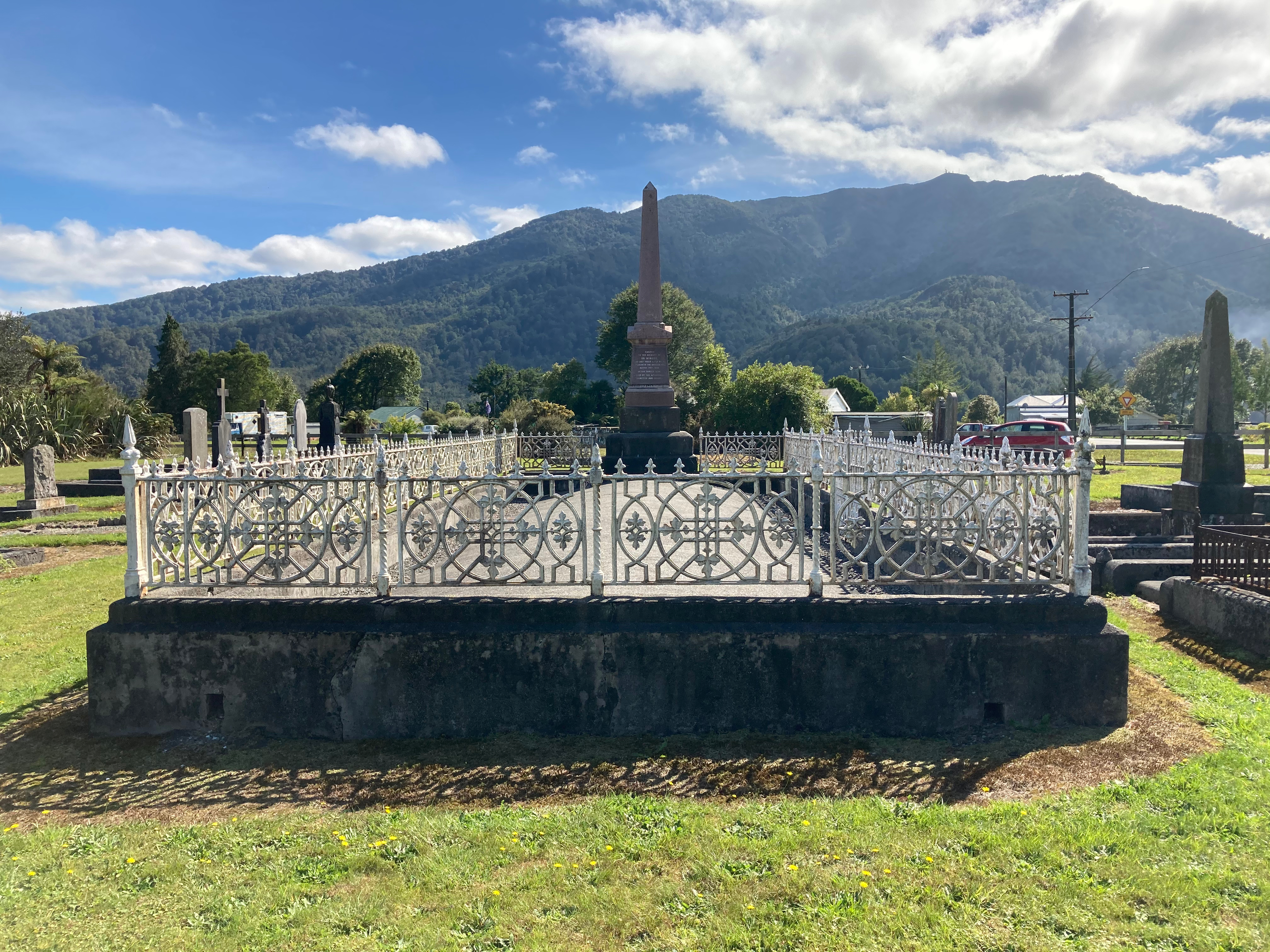
The mass grave site in March 2021

The bodies of all 65 miners from the Brunner mine were eventually accounted for, including a Mr. John Roberts and three of his sons who were all working that day. The miners were buried at Stillwater, 33 of them in a mass grave.

A disaster relief fund was established to support the families of the deceased miners. Over £32,000 was raised for the fund, equivalent to NZ$6.46 million in December 2020. Contributions to the fund came from many towns including Auckland, Nelson, Christchurch, Lyttleton and Invercargill.

== Inquiry ==
A Royal Commission was appointed to investigate the disaster. Four commissioners were appointed: district court judge Charles Ward, geologist Sir James Hector, colliery manager Joseph Proud, and coal miner Thomas Skellon. The commission reported back to the Governor-General on 15 June 1896.

== See also ==
- Mining in New Zealand
- Mining accident
- Pike River Mine disaster
