= Denniston Plateau =

Plateau in New Zealand

- Denniston-Stockton Plateau, Mount Rochfort Plateau
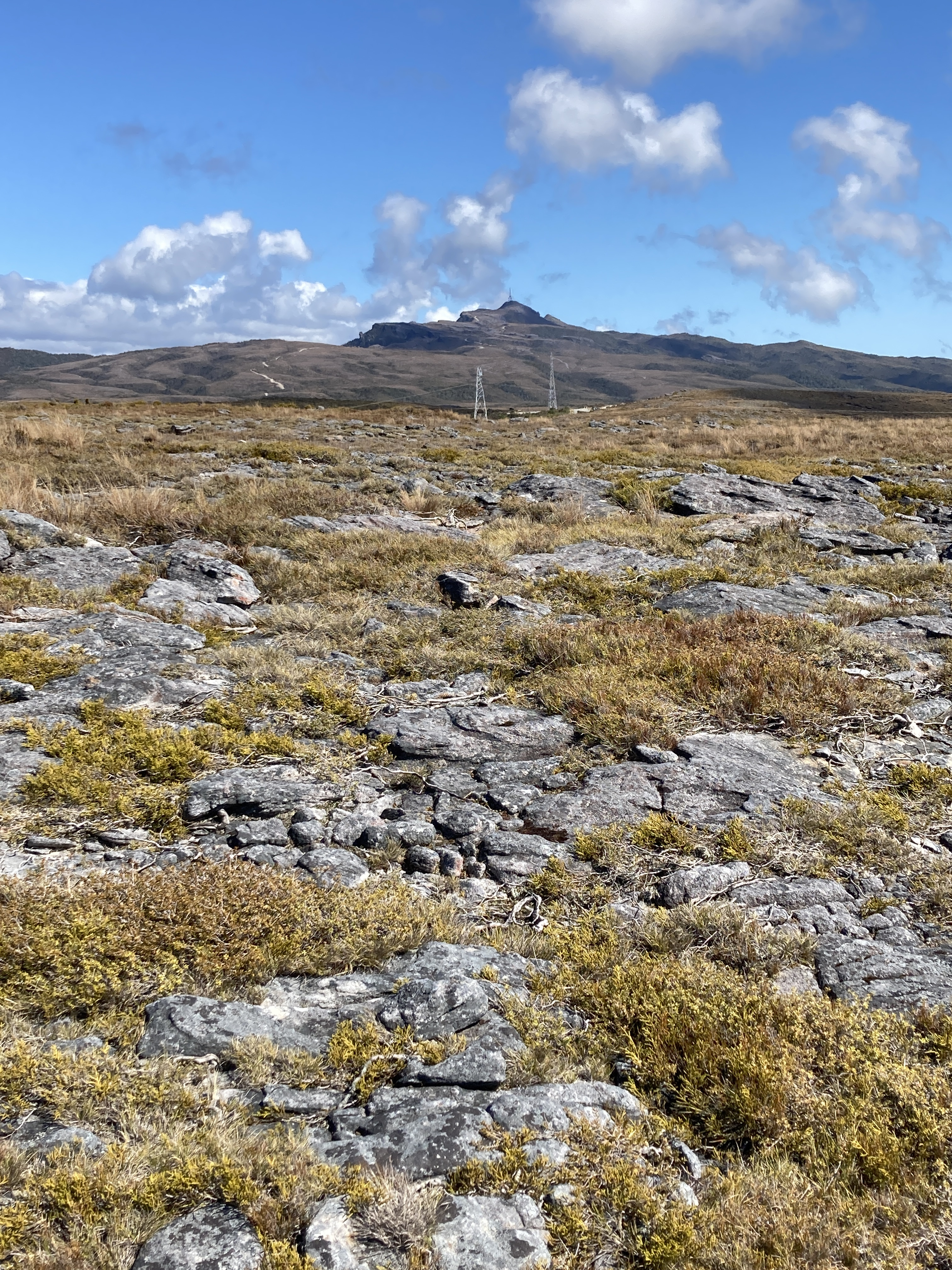
- View south to Mt Rochfort

Highest point
- Elevation: 600 m (2,000 ft)
- Coordinates: 41°44′47″S 171°47′59″E

Naming
- Etymology: Named after the coal mine manager

Geography
- Location: Buller District, West Coast Region, New Zealand
- Parent range: Papahaua Range

Denniston Plateau (technically the Denniston-Stockton Plateau) is an 18 km long, 600–800 m high coalfield plateau in the Papahaua Range on the West Coast of the South Island of New Zealand. A combination of impermeable rock, high rainfall, and shallow acidic soil has created a unique ecosystem of stunted trees and heath-like vegetation which is home to numerous endemic and undescribed species of plants and invertebrates. The plateau contains rich seams of high-quality coal, which led to the creation and abandonment of the mining towns of Denniston and Millerton, and the current Stockton Mine. Plans to create a new open-cast mine on the southern part of the plateau have become an environmental controversy.

== Physiography ==
The Denniston-Stockton Plateau stretches approximately 18 kilometres (11 mi), from Mount Rochfort near Westport in the south to Granity in the north. It is about 3–4 kilometres (1.9–2.5 mi) wide, and 600–800 metres (2,000–2,600 ft) above sea level, lower at its northern (Millerton) and southern (Denniston) extents, and highest in the middle towards Mount Frederick. It is bisected by the Waimangaroa River into Denniston and Stockton plateaus, which are sometimes referred to individually, though the term "Denniston Plateau" is often used to refer to the entire landform and ecosystem.

== Geology ==
The main rock on the surface of the plateau is sandstone, which has eroded into coarse and acidic silica sand. It is sometimes referred to as the "Buller Coal Plateau", because beneath the sandstone are rich seams of high-quality bituminous coal, laid down in swamps 45 million years ago. Partly-decayed plant material was compressed into peat 42–45 million years ago, then covered over by encroaching ocean and rock, and compressed once again under the ocean into coal 37 million years ago. The plateau was raised to its current altitude within the last 2 million years as part of the rapidly-rising Southern Alps.

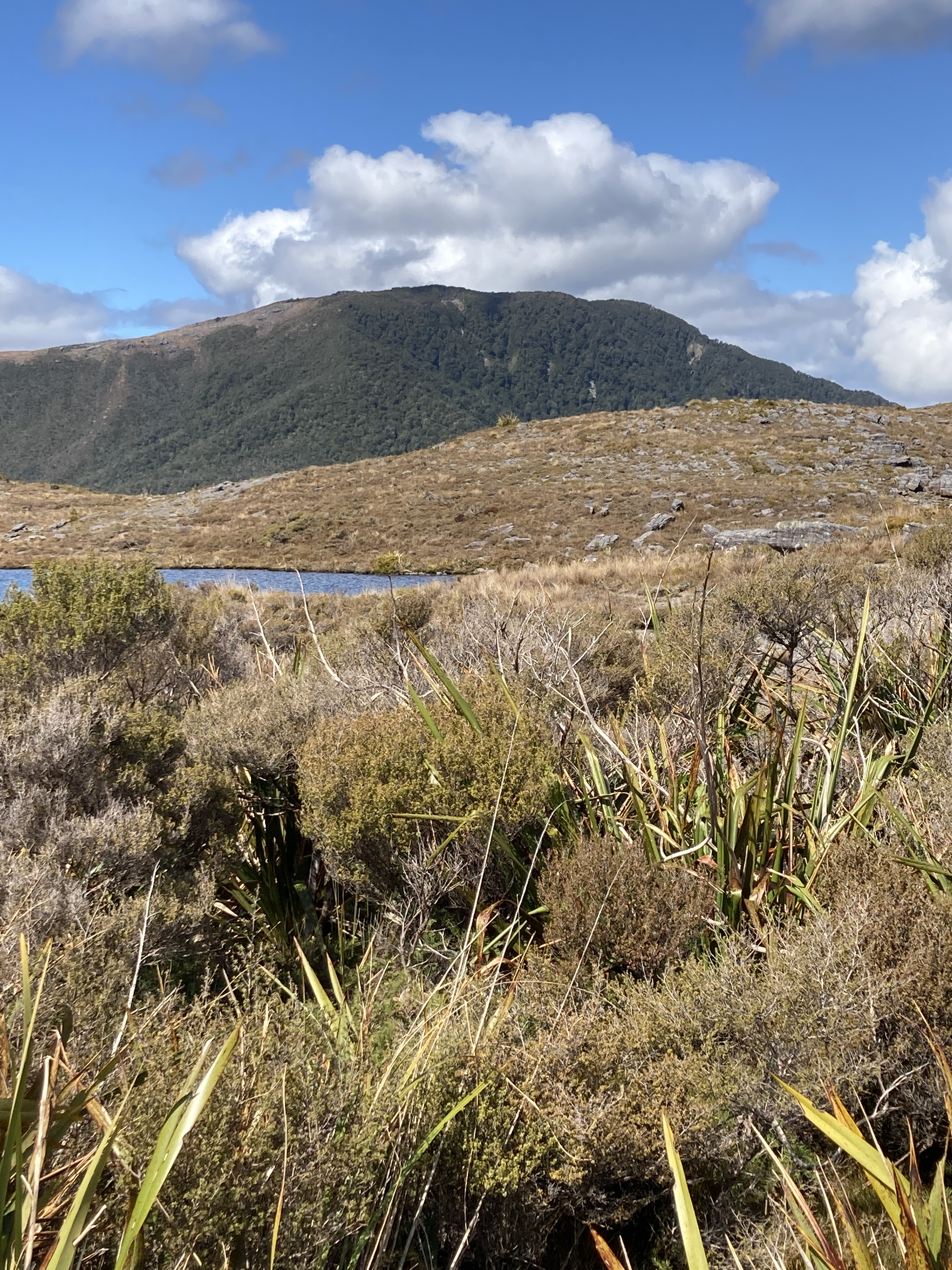
View across mānuka scrub to Mt William

The soil on the plateau is thin at best, often infertile and low in organic matter, poorly drained, and acidic; miners in Denniston had to bring all the soil required to create their flower gardens and bowling green up the Denniston Incline. Yet, it supports a diverse ecology. The impermeable layer of sandstone means the ground is frequently waterlogged and there are large expanses of bare, eroded rock with no soil at all. The waterlogged ground and physical isolation of the Plateau has led to an ecological system uniquely associated with the local geology.

== Climate ==
The plateau has a harsh climate: high rainfall, low sunshine hours, cold, wind, and often mist.

== Flora ==
The vegetation of the plateau appears sparse and scrubby, but this is an adaptation to the harsh climate and poor soils: there is a high diversity of plant species, and some of the bonsai-like small shrubs are hundreds of years old. The plateau includes alpine plants found at unusually low altitudes and several localised or endemic plants.

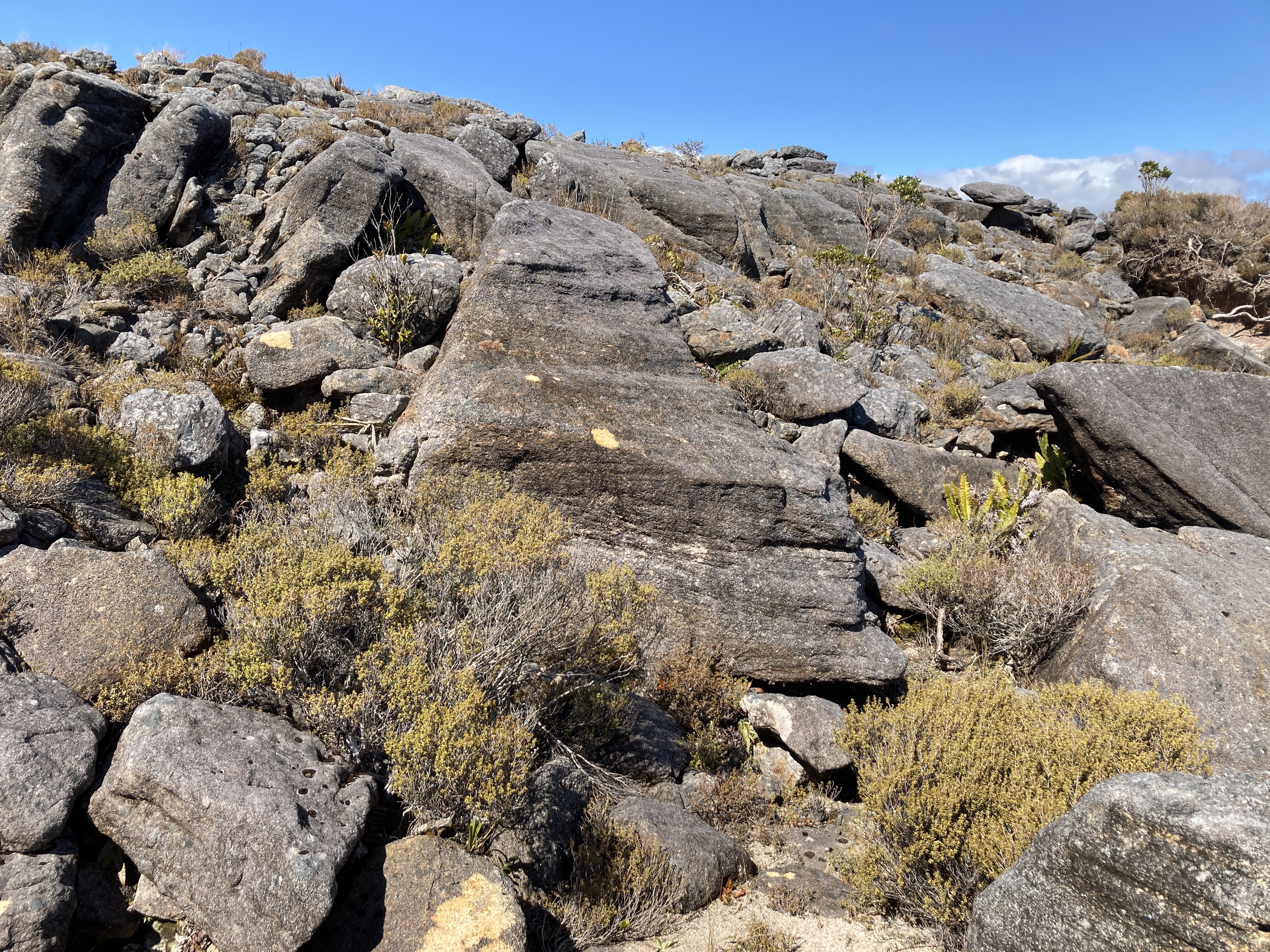
Rātā, mānuka, and ferns growing in bare rock on the plateau

In more sheltered areas and better soils, the vegetation is a low forest consisting of mānuka (Leptospermum scopiarium), mountain five-finger (Neopanax colensoi), southern rātā (Metrosideros umbellata), and mountain flax (Phormium colensoi). In more exposed areas the growing conditions are similar to the pakihi swampland of lower altitudes, and contains similar species such as mānuka, tangle fern (Gleischenia dicarpa), and various rushes. But the more varied topography of the plateau creates greater diversity of habitats and species, including bog pine (Halocarpus bidwillii), pygmy pine (Lepidothamnus laxifolius), yellow silver pine (L. intermedius), and several species of shrubby or stunted Dracophyllum. North towards Millerton the rocky plateau has dwarfed kāmahi (Weinmannia racemosa), and both southern and northern rātā (Metrosideros robusta). Many small flowers occur on the plateau: gentians, eyebright (Euphrasia wettsteiniana), orchids such as the mauve sun orchid (Thelymitra decora) and swamp sun orchid (T. cyanea), and in wetter areas carnivorous sundews (Drosera spatulata).

Some distinctive species include:

- Dracophyllum townsonii, restricted to the northern West Coast, and D. densum, found mostly on Denniston Plateau and the Paparoa Range nearby
- Four species of Celmisia daisies that reach their southern limit here or in the Paparoas: mountain daisy (C. dubia), scrub daisy (C. lateralis), Dall's mountain daisy (C. dalii), and C. similus.
- North Westland snow tussock (Chionochloa juncea), found only on the Denniston-Stockton Plateau

== Fauna ==
The plateau has great spotted kiwi (Apteryx haastii), fernbirds (Poodytes punctatus) and New Zealand pipits (Anthus novaeseelandiae), as well as weka, kea, and riflemen. Reptiles include speckled skink, coastal green gecko, and forest gecko (which here inhabits scrubland).

Several species of large carnivorous Powelliphanta snail are found on the plateau, and some are endemic to it and threatened by mining.

- Powelliphanta patrickensis, found only on coalfields over 750 m between Denniston and Mt Rochfort and in the Millerton area
- Powelliphanta lignaria 'Millerton', found only on a few hectares near Millerton, thought to be extinct, and rediscovered in 2005
- Powelliphanta augusta, whose 5 ha of habitat on Mount Augustus was destroyed by the mining company Solid Energy. Four thousand snails were relocated, and 2,000 taken into captivity in refrigerated shipping containers in 2006. Attempts to reintroduce the captive snails in the Stockton area were unsuccessful, and nearly 2,000 remain in plastic containers in cold storage, cared for by the Department of Conservation until they are confident the species can survive in the wild. A refrigeration accident in 2011 killed 800 of the snails.

In response to a proposed open-cast coal mine, 150 scientists and volunteers conducted a weekend bioblitz on the plateau in March 2012 and discovered several new species:

- a nationally critically endangered day-flying moth, Arctesthes avatar, described in 2019 and named after the movie Avatar, whose plot concerns a mining company destroying a pristine environment
- a new genus of cave wētā or tokoriro, Occultastella morgana, informally dubbed the Denniston white-faced wētā
- a beetle, another moth, a wingless wasp, and three spiders
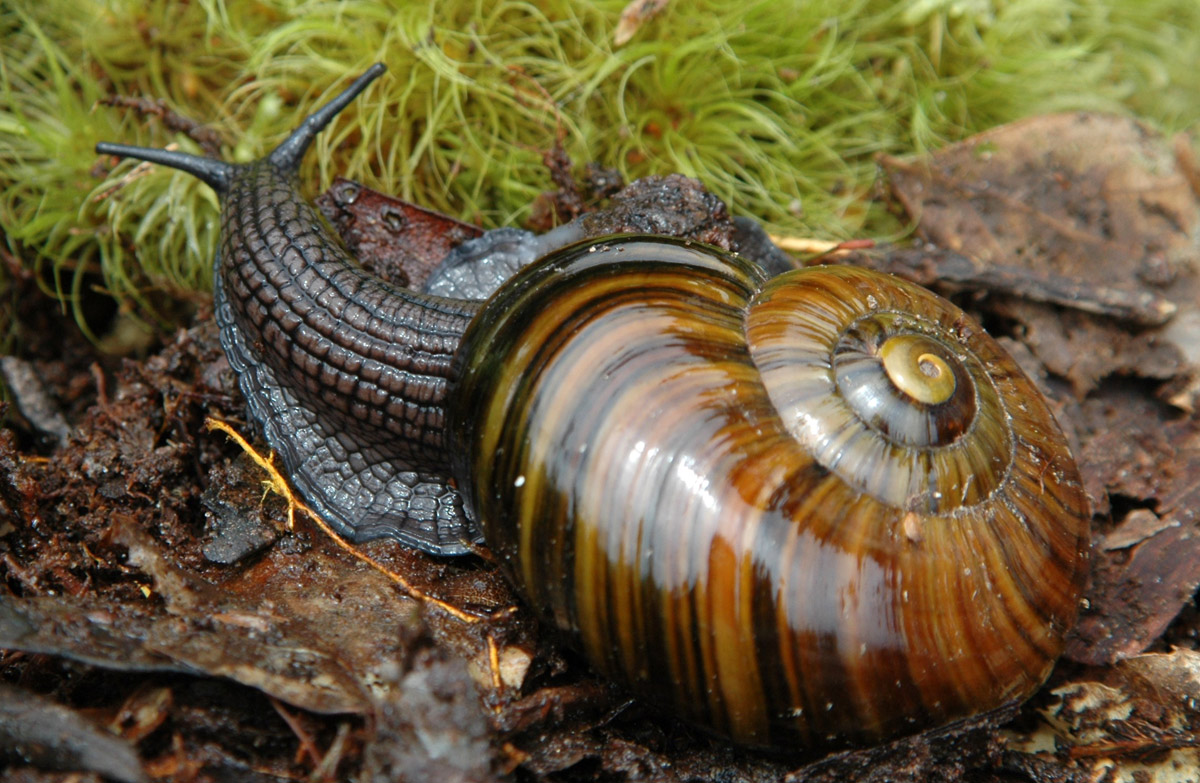
Powelliphanta patrickensis

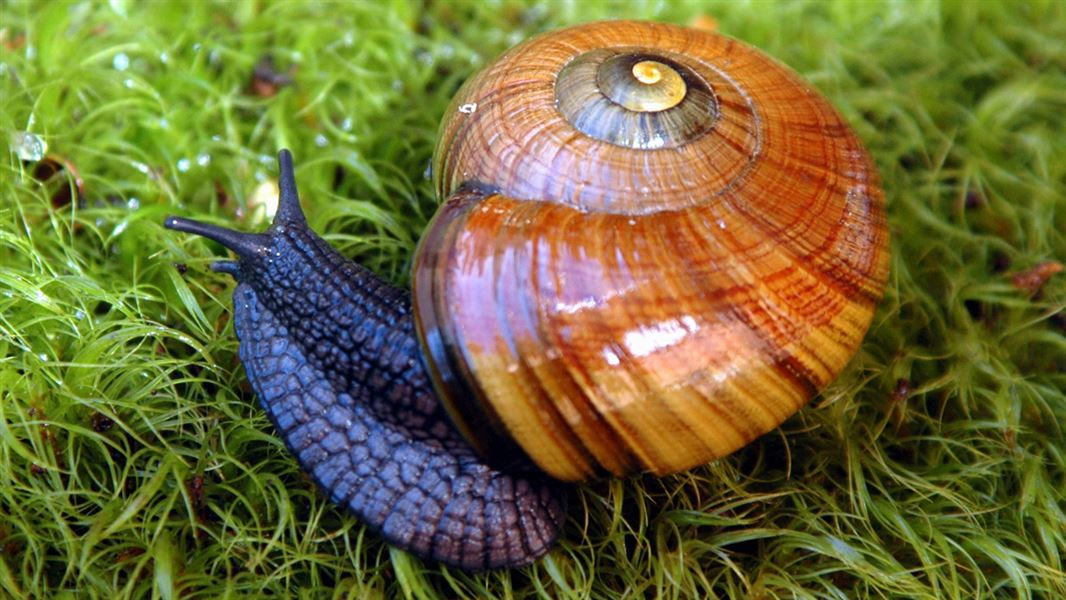
Powelliphanta augusta

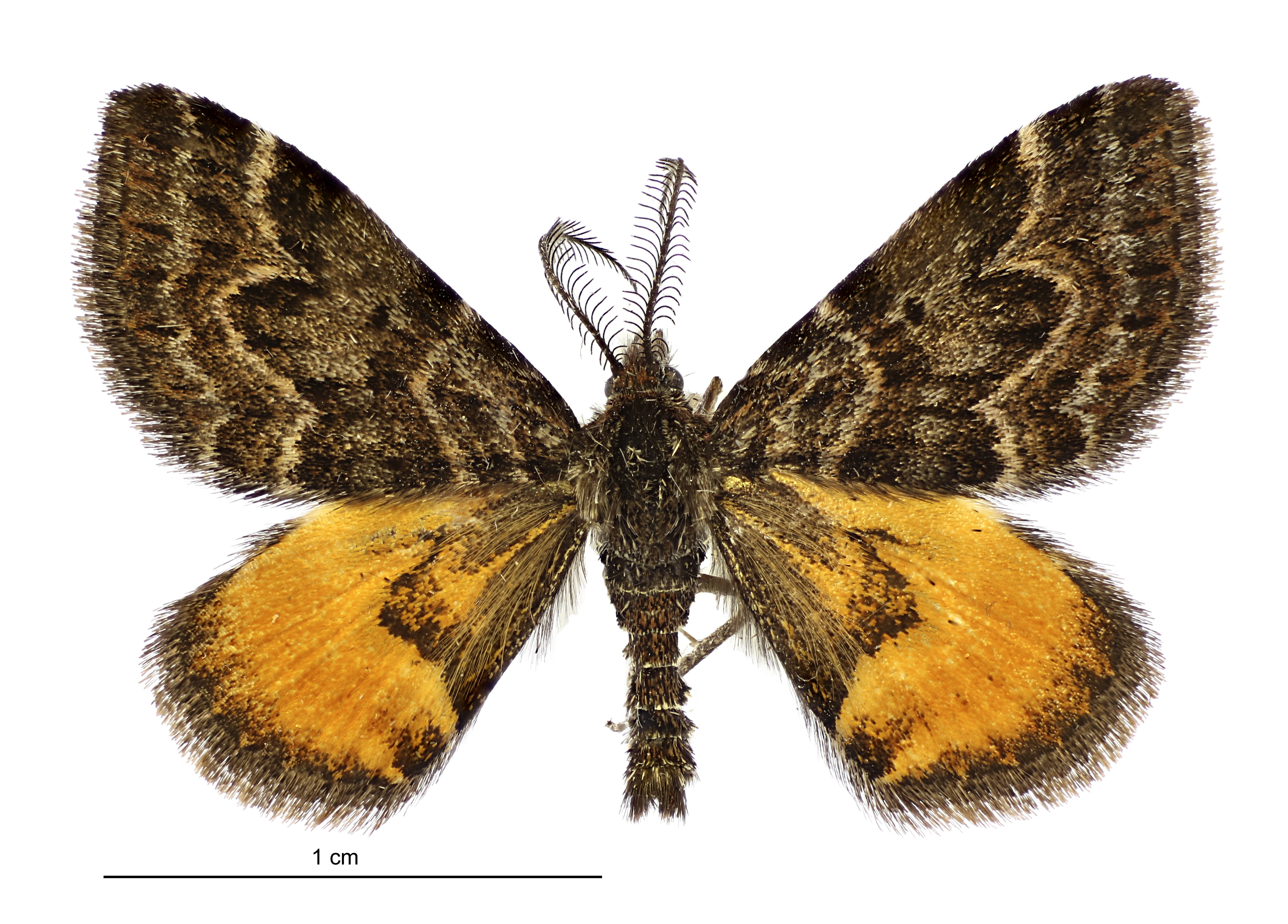
Male Arctesthes avatar

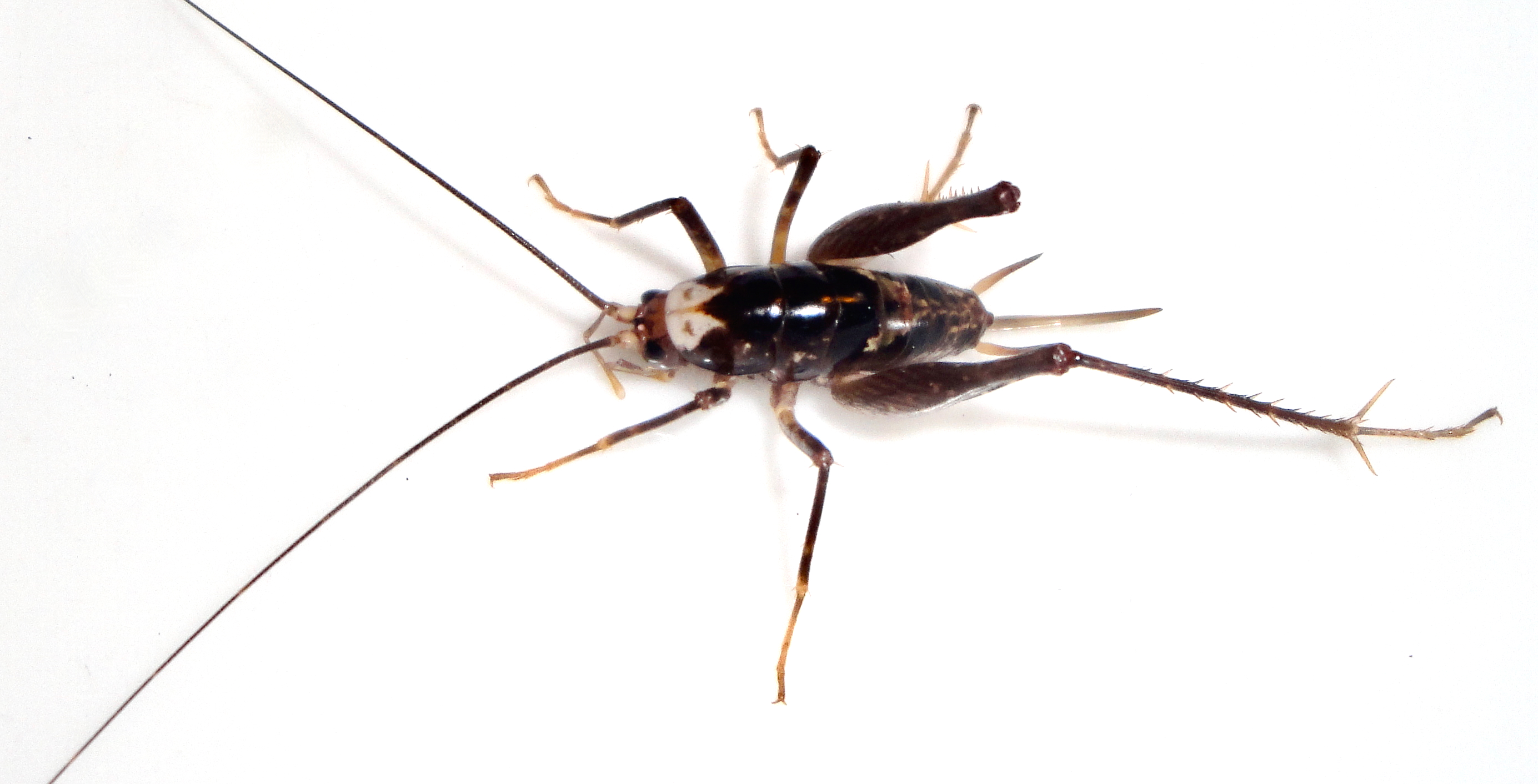
Occultastella morgana

== Conservation ==
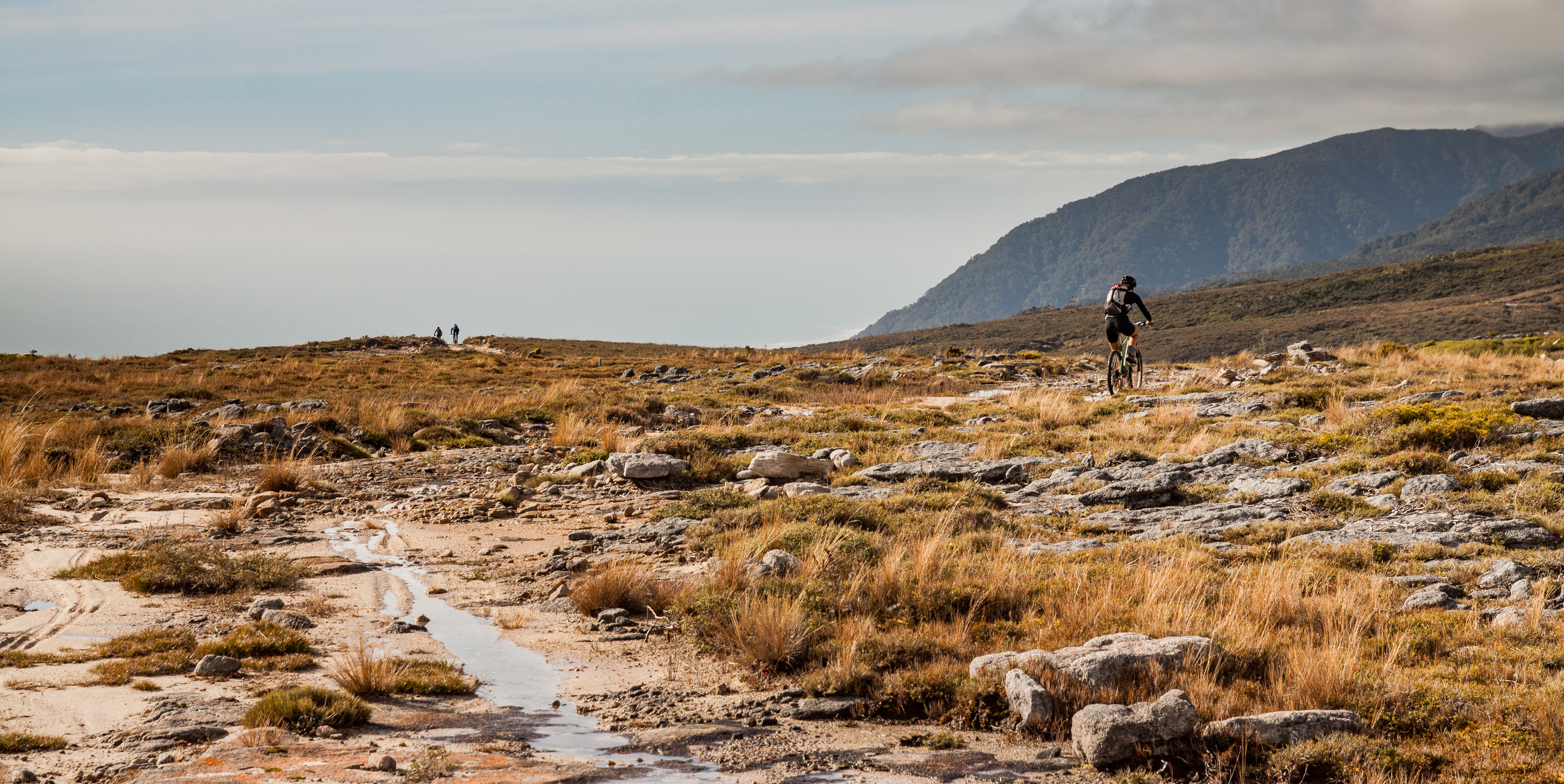
Recreational mountain biking on the plateau

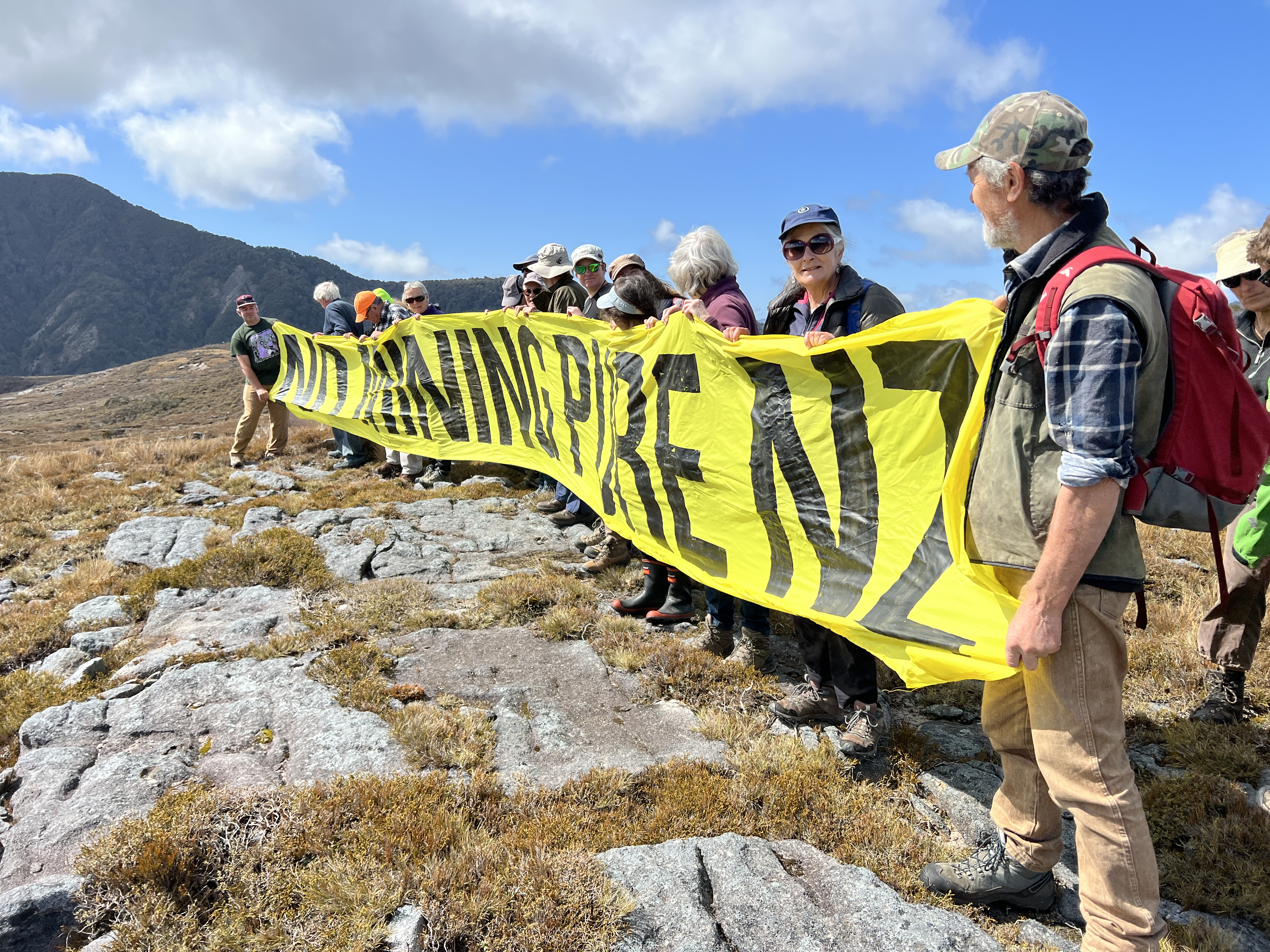
A protest against mining on the Plateau in October 2022

The northern part of the plateau has been heavily modified by Solid Energy's large Stockton mine. In 2011 Australian-based Bathurst Resources gained consents for the Escarpment Mine Project in the southern part of the plateau towards Mt Rochfort, which would involve stripping and "relocating" the surface vegetation, removing and stockpiling the sandstone layer, and creating an open-cast mine. The land would supposedly be rehabilitated after mining, but the unique drainage and soil conditions, and thus much of the biodiversity, would be destroyed. This created years of conflict between councils and governments wanting short-term economic relief for the people of the West Coast, and those who valued the unique and delicate ecosystem of the plateau. Environmental groups fought the consents in court for two years but they were upheld by the Environment Court in 2013. Forest and Bird proposed a 5900 ha reserve on the plateau, and organised a bioblitz to learn more about its species diversity. Bathurst was given consent to mine the plateau in 2014 by the Department of Conservation, in exchange for $21.9 million in compensation spread over seven years. During the planning process the price of coal dropped significantly, and the closure of the Holcim cement works at Cape Foulwind – the main market for the coal – made the project uneconomic; Bathurst suspended its operation in 2016.

In 2024 Bathurst Resources proposed expanding the Escarpment Mine Project on Denniston Plateau under the Fast-track Approvals Act 2024. Bathurst Resources claimed Stockton Mine was nearly depleted, and expanding the mothballed project on Denniston Plateau would extend coking coal production by 20 years, employing 390 people. Seventy protestors camped on Denniston Plateau in April 2025 and climbed into coal buckets used to transport coal via aerial ropeway from Stockton Mine to Ngakawau for loading onto trains. The protestors claimed the 20 million tonnes of coal produced equated to 56 million tonnes of carbon emissions, and would threaten unique species on the plateau that were found nowhere else.

In November 2025 the Green Party committed to cancel any proposed mining at Denniston Plateau should they form part of the next government.

In late September 2026, a fast-track approvals panel rejected Bathurst Resources's application to mine Denniston Plateau as incomplete.

== See also ==
- Mining in New Zealand
