= Kath Walker =

Kath Walker may refer to:

- Oodgeroo Noonuccal (1920–1993), earlier known as Kath Walker, Aboriginal Australian political activist, artist and educator
- Kath Walker (scientist), New Zealand conservation scientist
