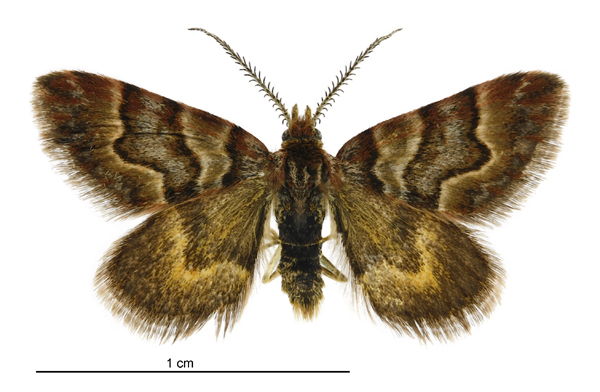
- Male
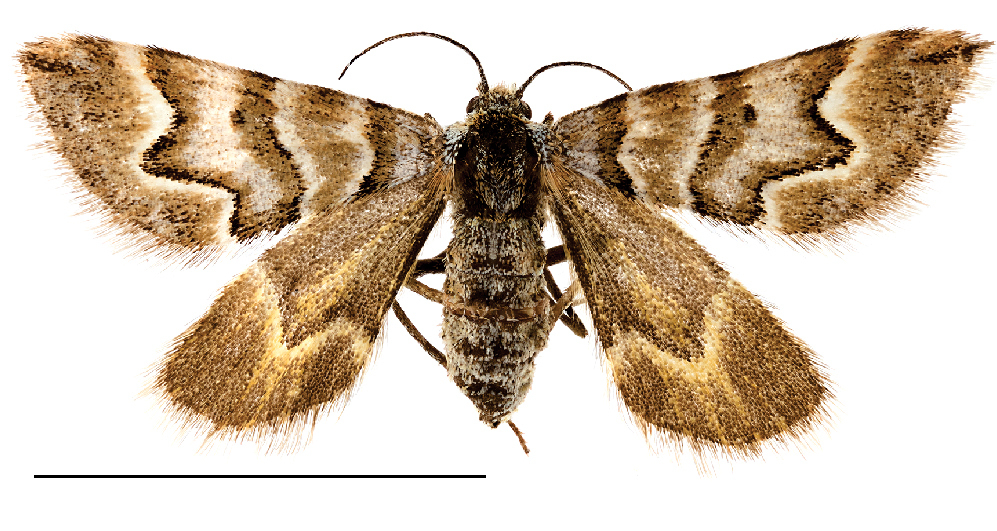
- Female

Scientific classification
- Domain: Eukaryota
- Kingdom: Animalia
- Phylum: Arthropoda
- Class: Insecta
- Order: Lepidoptera
- Family: Geometridae
- Genus: Arctesthes
- Species: A. siris

Binomial name
- Arctesthes siris (Hudson, 1908)
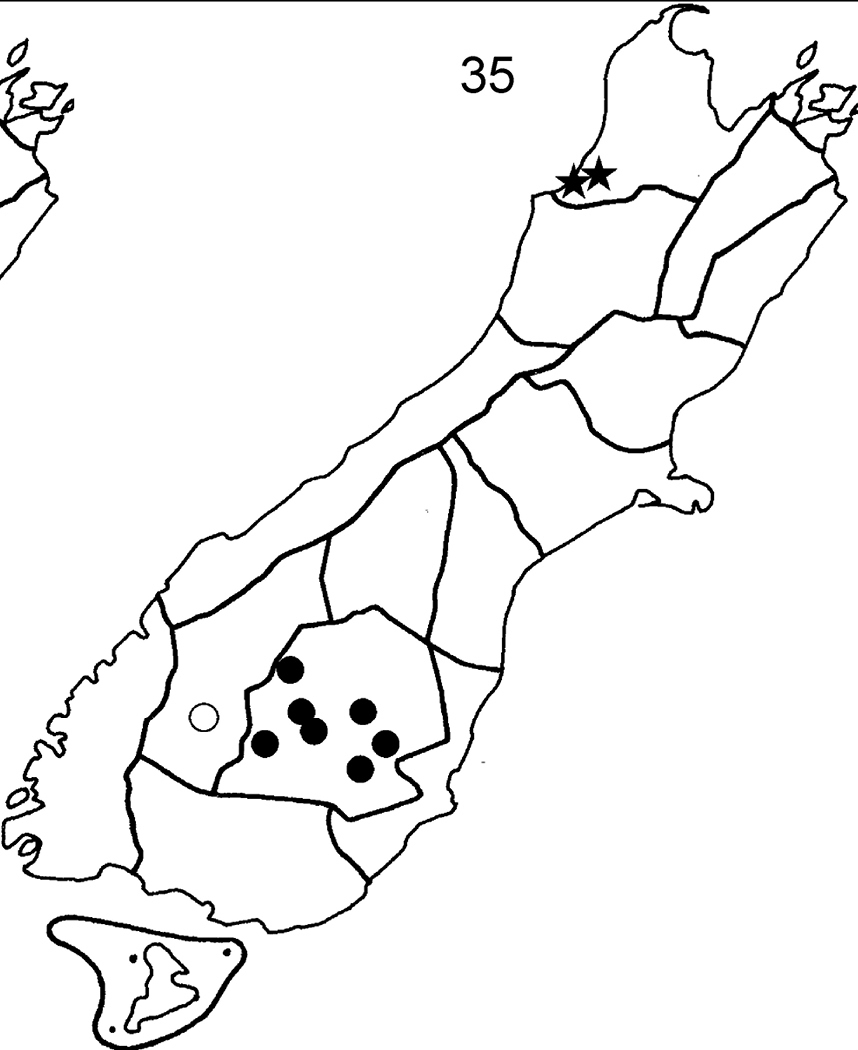
- A. siris = black circles

Synonyms
- Lythria siris Hudson, 1908

= Arctesthes siris =

Species of moth

Arctesthes siris is a moth of the family Geometridae. It is endemic to New Zealand and has only been found in a handful of mountainous areas in Central Otago. As of 2019 the larvae of this species has not been described but the larval hosts of this species are low growing plants in the genera Coprosma and Plantago. Adults are day flying and are on the wing from early December until mid April. This species inhabits mountainous wetland areas and snowbanks. It has been observed flying low over its preferred habitat and has been seen together with its sister species A. catapyrrha. A. siris can be distinguished from A. catapyrrha as A. siris has a noticeable concave curve in the proximal line of its forewing.

== Taxonomy ==
This species was first described by George Vernon Hudson in 1908 under the name Lythria siris. He based his description on specimens discovered by J. H. Lewis at approximately 1200 metres in altitude in the Old Man Range of Central Otago. In 1928 Hudson discussed and illustrated this species under that name in his publication The butterflies and moths of New Zealand. In 1939 Louis Beethoven Prout placed this species in the genus Arctesthes. In 1986 R. C. Craw agreed with this reinstatement the genus and the placement of this species within it. This placement was accepted by John S. Dugdale in 1988. The species was redescribed in 2019. The lectotype specimen is held at Te Papa.

== Description ==
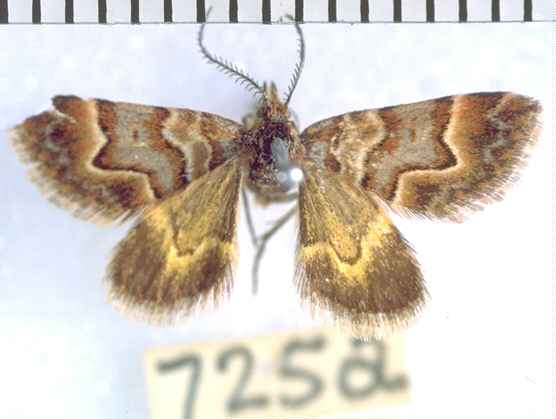
Male lectotype specimen

Hudson described this species as follows:

The expansion of the wings is a little over 5/8 in. The forewings are slaty-grey, with light reddish-brown, black, and pale-yellowish markings; there is a very small grey area at the base, followed by a wavy transverse reddish-brown band; next two yellowish-white bands enclosing a very narrow yellowish-brown area; then a strongly waved whitish line, followed by a narrow black line and a broad reddish-brown line; the central area is broad, slaty - grey, with a reddish-brown discal dot; this is followed by an extremely sharply angulated series of lines, consisting of a narrow reddish-brown line, a narrow black line, a narrow yellowish-white line, and a shaded orange-brown line; the termen is shaded with dark-brown with a very fine, wavy, whitish line and a series of small reddish-brown spots. The hindwings are golden-yellow, the basal and terminal portions broadly clouded with black, and a very wavy central black line. The cilia of all the wings are brownish-grey. The female is paler, and much less distinctly marked than the male.

A. siris is smaller than its sister species A. catapyrrha and can be distinguished as A. siris has a noticeable concave curve in the proximal line of its forewing.

== Distribution and habitat ==
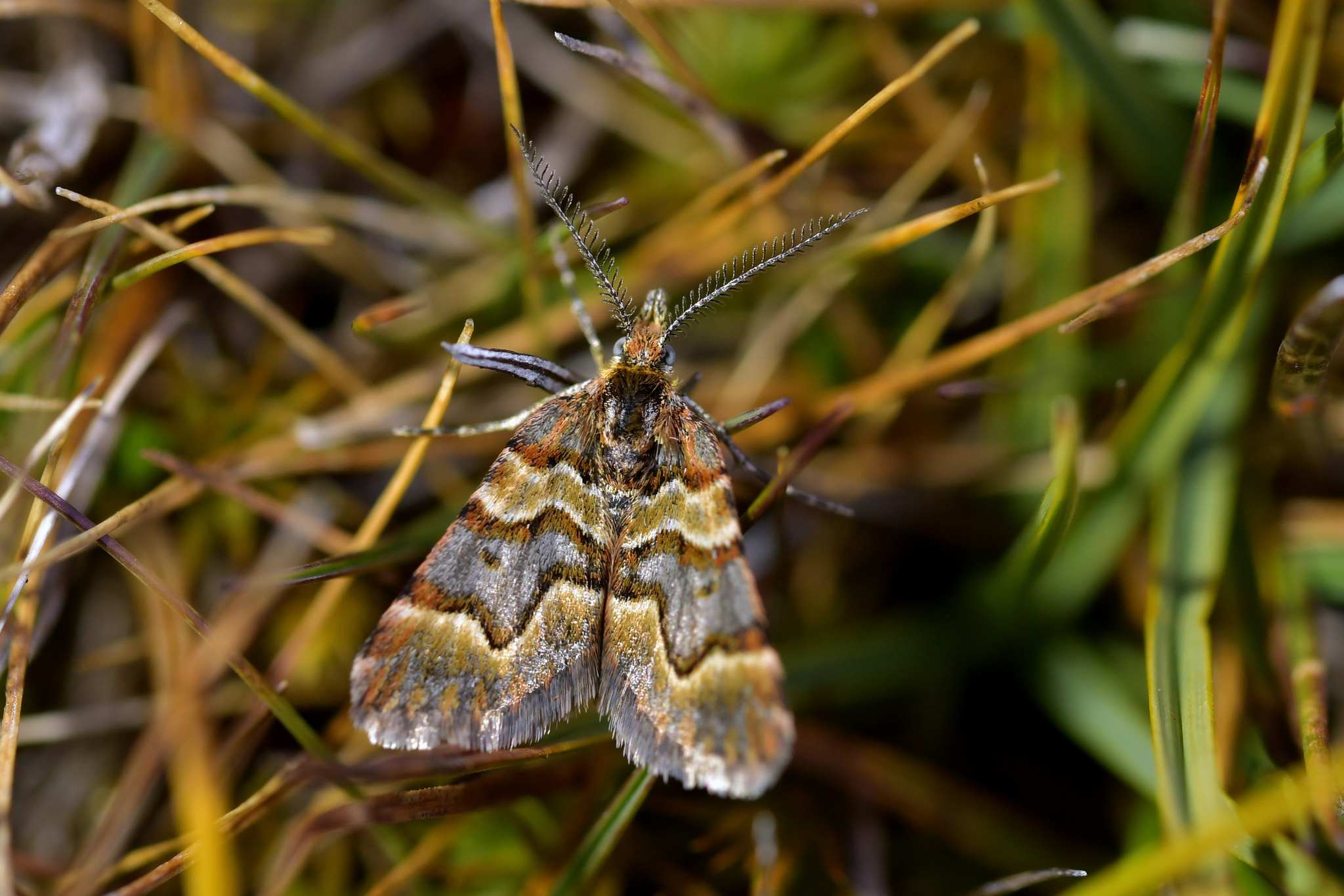
Observation of live moth

A. siris is endemic to New Zealand. This species is only found in alpine areas of Otago where it prefers wetland areas and snow banks. It has been observed at altitudes of 1300 – 1500 metres. The species has been recorded in the Lammermoor Range, on the Garvie Mountains, the Old Man and Old Woman ranges and the Rock and Pillar ranges.

== Behaviour and life stages ==
A. siris is a day flying moth and are low flying. Adults have been observed on the wing from early December until mid April. As at 2019 the larvae of this species has not been described.

== Host species ==
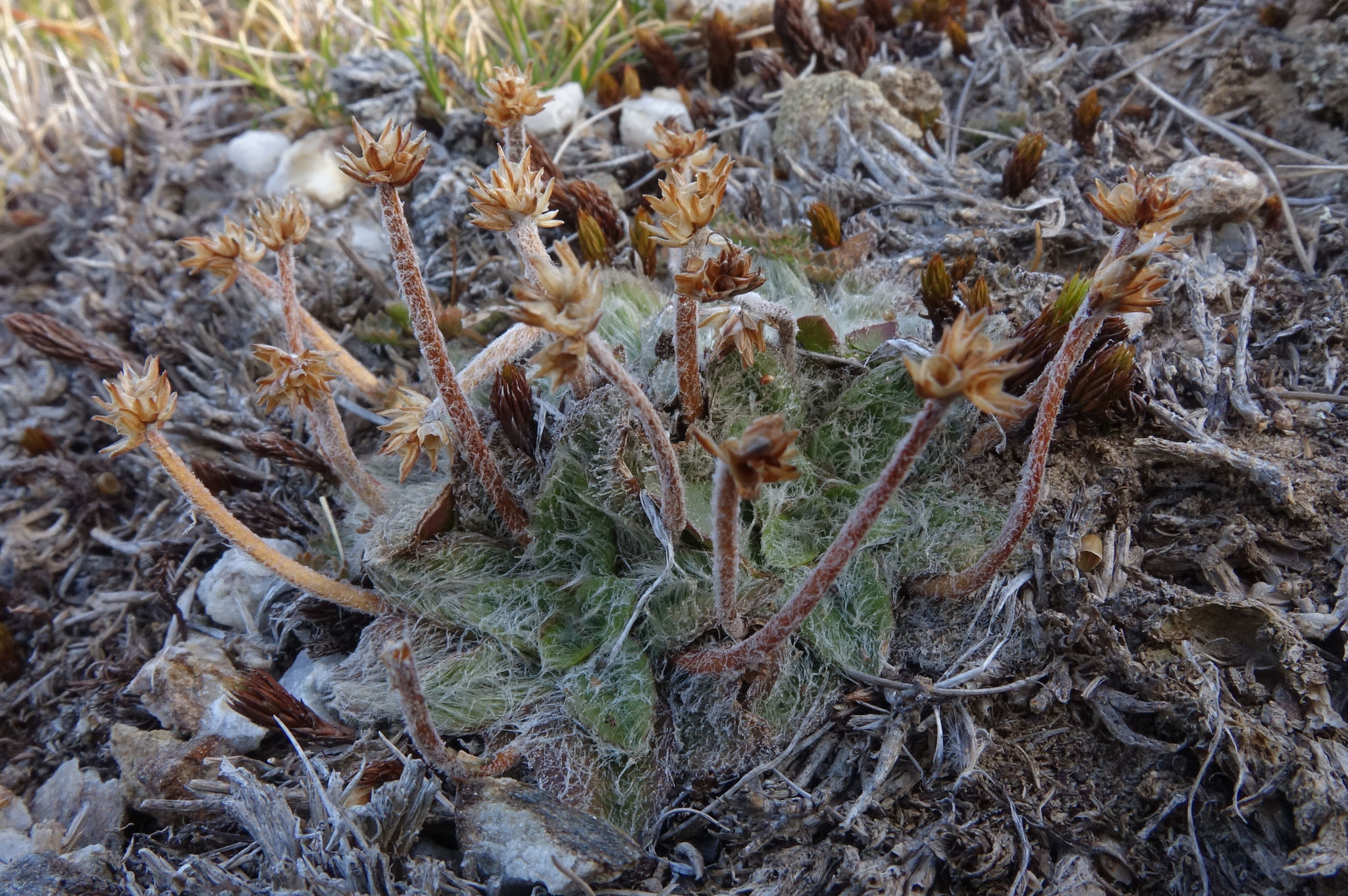
Likely host species P. lanigera observed near the Old Man Range

The host species for A. siris include mat-forming Coprosma species as well as low growing species in the genus Plantago.
