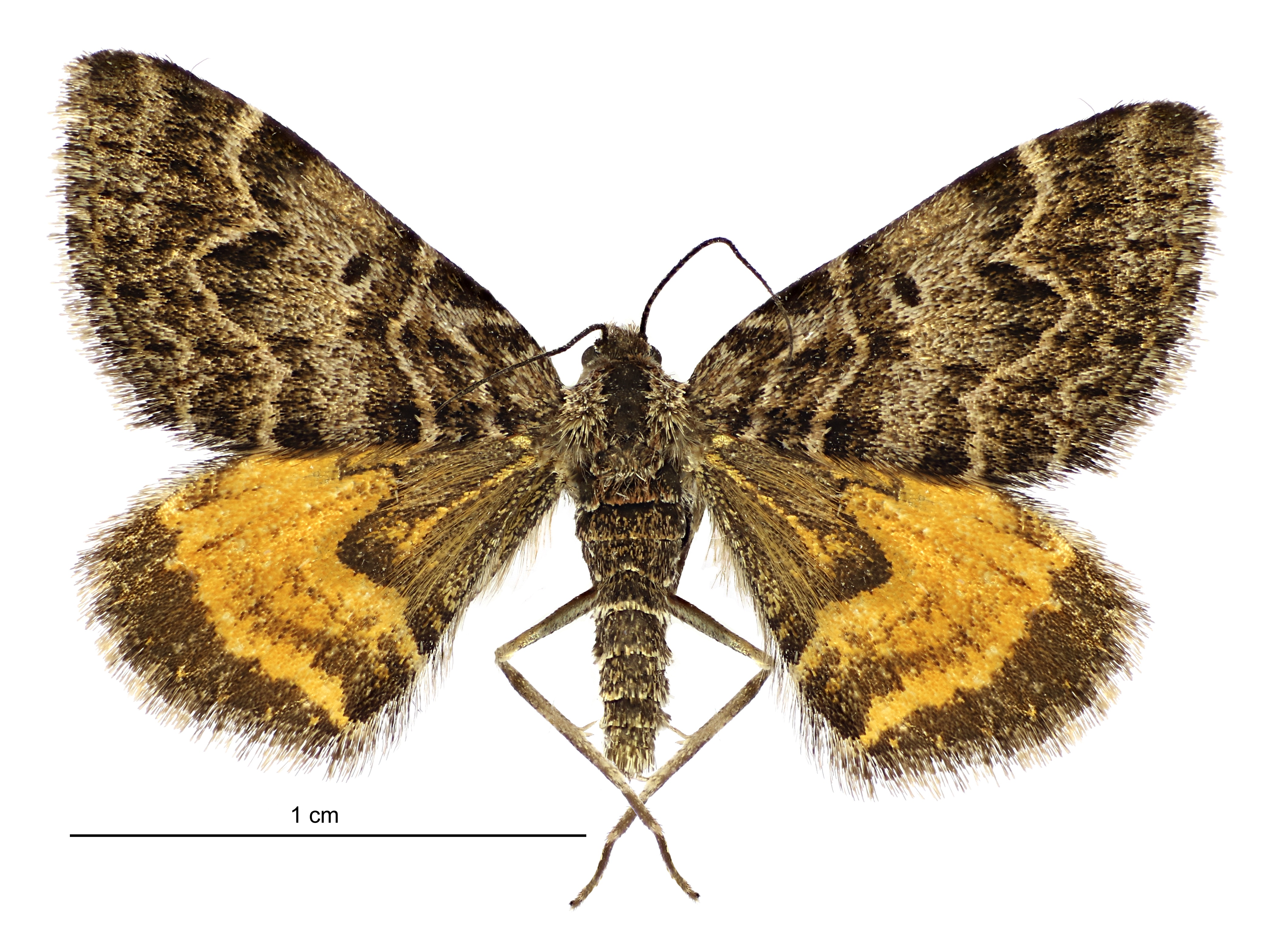
- Female
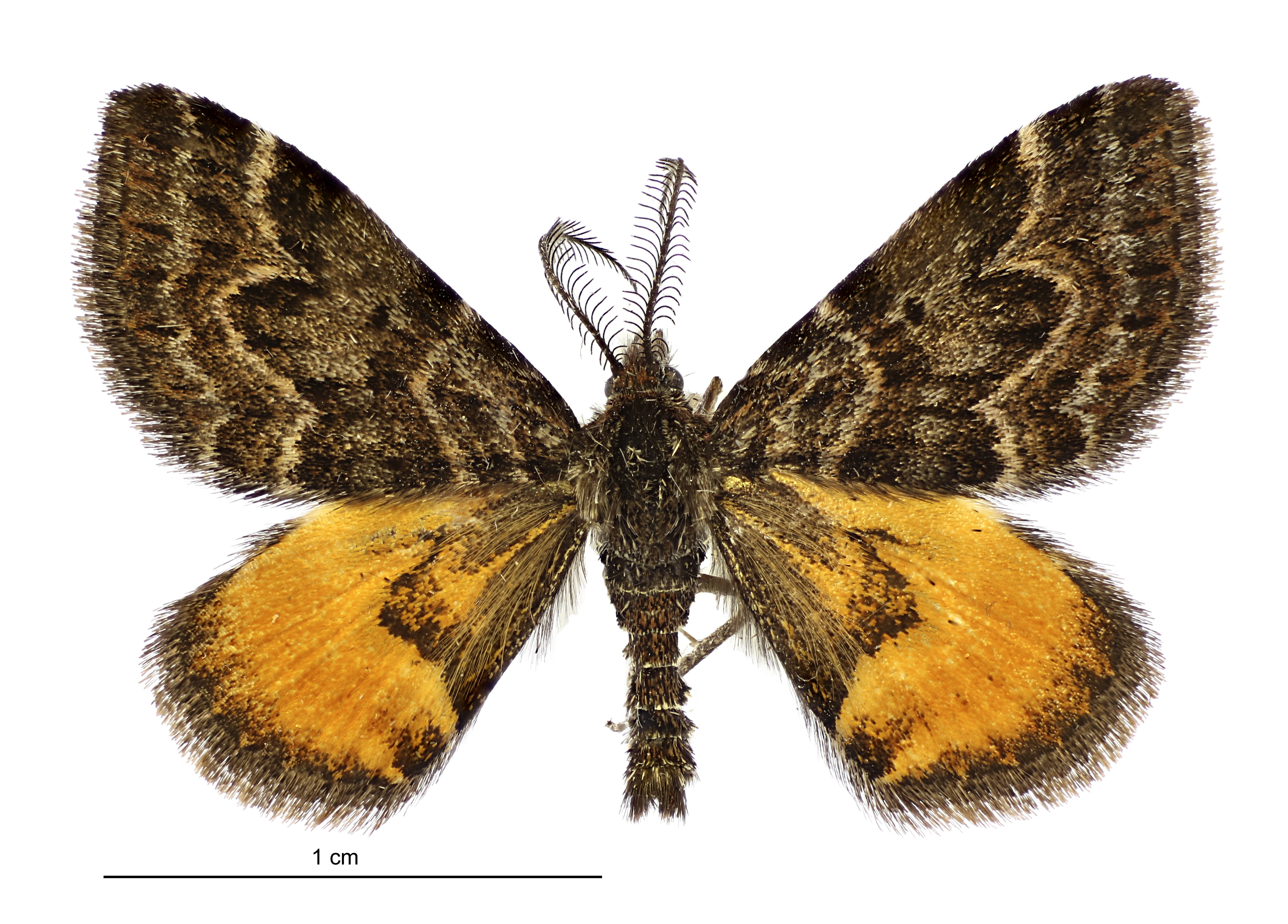
- Male

Conservation status
- Nationally Critical (NZ TCS)

Scientific classification
- Kingdom: Animalia
- Phylum: Arthropoda
- Clade: Pancrustacea
- Class: Insecta
- Order: Lepidoptera
- Family: Geometridae
- Genus: Arctesthes
- Species: A. avatar

Binomial name
- Arctesthes avatar Patrick, Patrick & Hoare, 2019
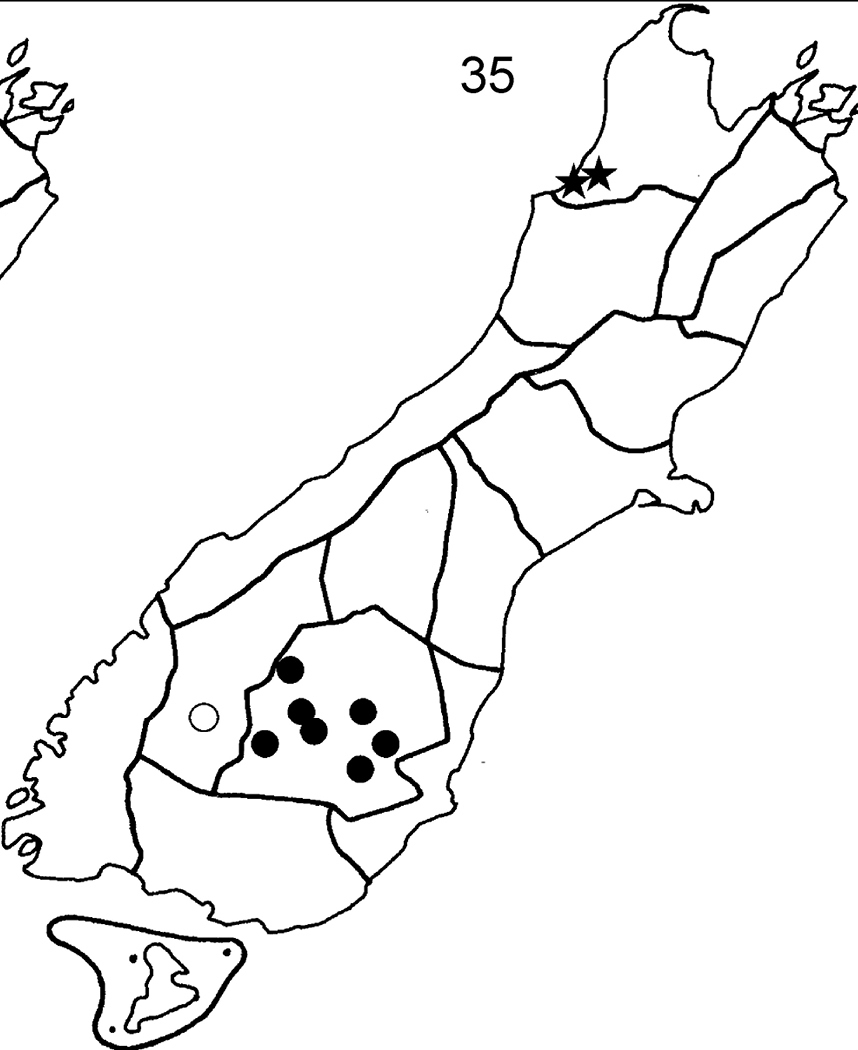
- A. avatar = stars

= Arctesthes avatar =

Species of moth endemic to New Zealand

Arctesthes avatar, commonly known as the avatar moth or the Denniston triangle moth, is a moth of the family Geometridae and is endemic to New Zealand. It has been found in short-lived wetlands at elevations between 640 and 1000 metres, but only in the areas of the Denniston Plateau and the nearby Mount Rochfort in the Buller District of the West Coast Region of the South Island. The species was discovered by Brian Patrick in 2012, during a bio-blitz on the Denniston Plateau organised by Forest & Bird as part of a campaign against the planned development of an open-cast coal mine by Bathurst Resources. The name of the new species was proposed in 2012, following a competition run by Forest & Bird and judged by Patrick and his son. It was first described by Brian H. Patrick, Hamish J. H. Patrick and Robert J. B. Hoare in 2019. In 2025 this species was classified as "nationally critical" under the New Zealand Threat Classification System.

== Discovery ==
A new species of day-flying moth was discovered by Brian Patrick and his son in March 2012, during a bio-blitz on the Denniston Plateau organised by Forest & Bird, who were campaigning against the planned development of an open-cast coal mine by Bathurst Resources. A single male moth was found on the edge of a wetland, at an elevation of 670 metres (2,200 ft). Patrick made two more visits to the area in subsequent years, and netted another 10 individuals. This allowed work to begin on the formal description of the new species.

== Taxonomy and nomenclature ==
This species was first described in 2019 by Brian H. Patrick, Hamish J. H. Patrick and Robert J. B. Hoare and named Arctesthes avatar. Prior to its scientific description this species was known as Arctesthes sp. “Denniston”. A. avatar was named in honour of the 2009 movie Avatar, after Forest & Bird ran a competition in 2012 encouraging the public to submit suggested names to raise awareness about a proposed coal mine at the locality where this species is found. Brian and Hamish Patrick judged the submissions, and chose "avatar" as the epithet for this species, as the Avatar movie plot concerned a mining company and its actions threatening a fictional ecosystem. The male holotype specimen, collected at Denniston Plateau, is held in the New Zealand Arthropod Collection.

== Description ==
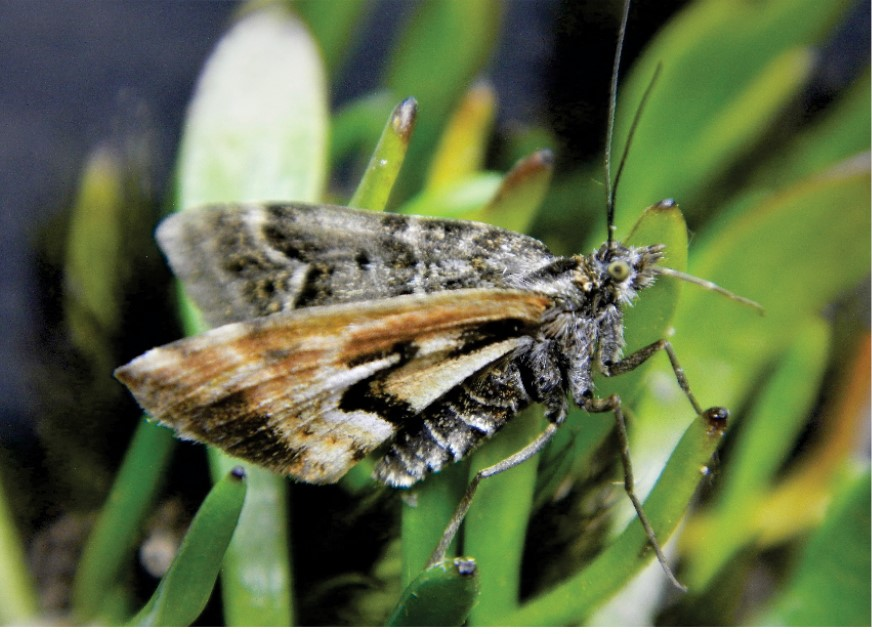
Female Arctesthes avatar.

The larvae have been described as being brown on the upper side and a paler shade on the underside of the caterpillar.

The adult male of this species was described as follows:

Adult male: Wingspan 20–22 mm. Very similar to A. titanica, with the following differences. Forewing with antemedian and postmedian lines slightly better defined than in titanica; postmedian line with indentation above median evagination and level with discal spot tending to be more pronounced than in titanica. Hindwing with dark antemedian line reaching much further across wing than in titanica (about half way to costa), and then diverting basad to join small variably distinct discal dot; terminal line present as dark brown fascia, with weakly scalloped inner margin; black dashes along termen absent. Forewing underside with postmedian line more distinct than in titanica and almost complete, reaching to near dorsum. Hindwing underside with blackish suffusion from base; area basad of antemedian line largely pale orange (not brown) and without dark edging to basal blotch; white fascia beyond antemedian line rather indistinct; from here to terminal fascia pale brownish orange, with brownish smudge at anal angle representing postmedian line; subterminal line very faintly paler, not distinct as in titanica (where it stands out against brown background).

The female of the species is similar in appearance to the male but is paler and does not have pectinations on the antennae.

== Habitat and hosts ==
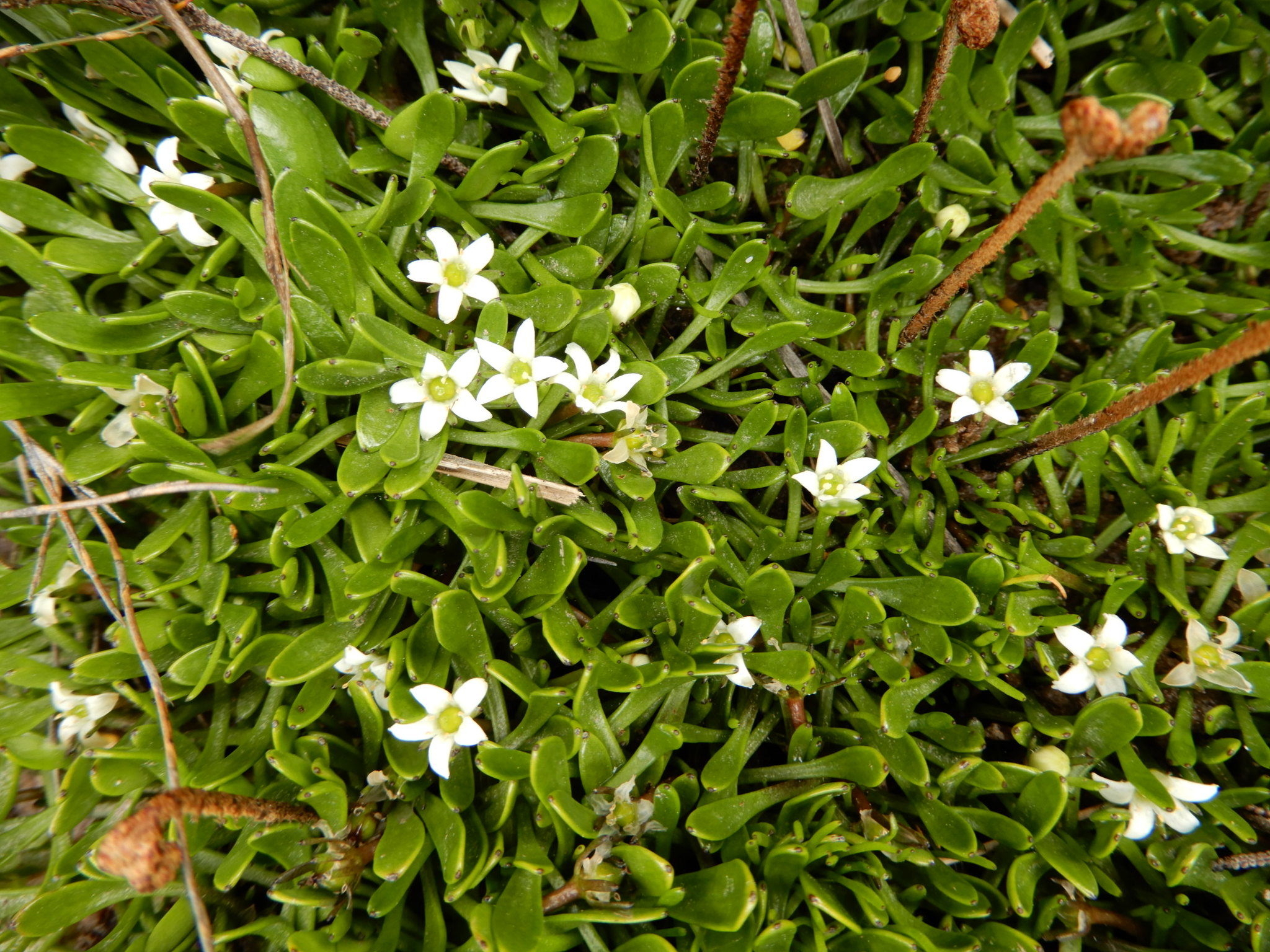
Possible larval host Liparophyllum gunnii.

This species inhabits short-lived wetlands on the Denniston Plateau and Mount Rochfort in the West Coast at altitudes of between 640 and 1000 m. Larvae of sister species in this genus feed on various species of native herbaceous plants. It has been hypothesised that the sole host of the larvae of this species is Liparophyllum gunnii, as females have been observed laying eggs on the underside of the leaves of this plant. An attempt was made to rear this species in captivity, with the larvae being feed on wilting leaves, stems and roots of this plant, but this was unsuccessful.

== Behaviour ==
This species is a day flying moth. Adults have been observed on the wing in February and March.

== Conservation status ==
In 2015 A. avatar has the "Nationally Critical" conservation status under the New Zealand Threat Classification System. It was given this classification as its total area of occupancy is smaller than 1 ha, in just one location. Since this classification this moth has also been located at Mount Rochfort, near the type locality of the species, but it is still regarded as being extremely localised. The threat status for this species was evaluated again in 2025 and confirmed to the "Nationally Critical". The 2025 evaluation stated the species was in need of conservation research and that it was regarded as being found at one location.

== Award ==
In 2026 this species was awarded the Bug of the Year by the Entomological Society of New Zealand.
