= Mount Augustus =

Mount Augustus may refer to:

- Mount Augustus, Western Australia
- Mount Augustus National Park, Western Australia
- Mount Augustus, New Zealand
