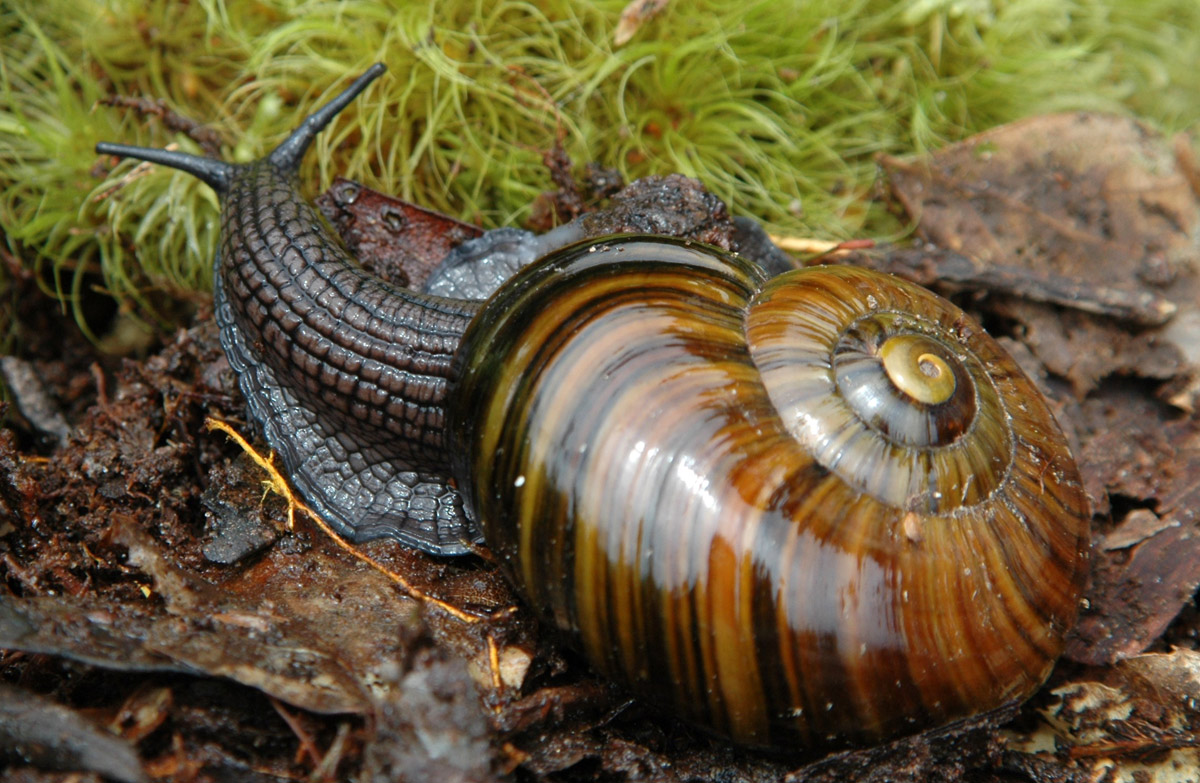

Conservation status
- Nationally Critical (NZ TCS)

Scientific classification
- Kingdom: Animalia
- Phylum: Mollusca
- Class: Gastropoda
- Order: Stylommatophora
- Family: Rhytididae
- Genus: Powelliphanta
- Species: P. patrickensis

Binomial name
- Powelliphanta patrickensis Powell, 1949

Synonyms
- Powelliphanta rossiana patrickensis Powell, 1949; Powelliphanta "patrickensis"

= Powelliphanta patrickensis =

Species of gastropod

Powelliphanta patrickensis is a species of large, carnivorous land snail, a terrestrial pulmonate gastropod mollusc in the family Rhytididae. This species is endemic to the South Island of New Zealand. Formerly, it was considered as a subspecies of Powelliphanta rossiana.

== Distribution ==
This species occurs only on the Denniston-Stockton Plateau on the South Island of New Zealand.

== Conservation status ==
Powelliphanta patrickensis is classified by the New Zealand Department of Conservation as being Nationally Critical. The population is threatened by mining, roading, and introduced predators such as thrushes, rats and possums.

== See also ==
- Biodiversity of New Zealand
- List of non-marine molluscs of New Zealand
