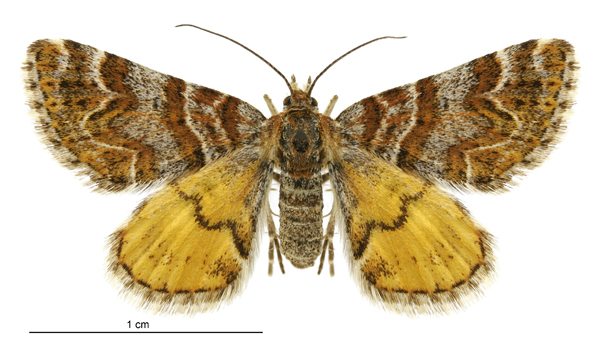
- Female Arctesthes catapyrrha

Scientific classification
- Kingdom: Animalia
- Phylum: Arthropoda
- Class: Insecta
- Order: Lepidoptera
- Family: Geometridae
- Subfamily: Larentiinae
- Genus: Arctesthes; Meyrick, 1885

= Arctesthes =

Genus of moths

Arctesthes is a genus of moths in the family Geometridae described by Edward Meyrick in 1885. It is endemic to New Zealand.

== Species ==
- Arctesthes avatar Patrick, Patrick & Hoare, 2019
- Arctesthes catapyrrha (Butler, 1877)
- Arctesthes siris (Hudson, 1908)
- Arctesthes titanica Patrick, Patrick & Hoare, 2019
