= Mount Rochfort =

Mountain in New Zealand

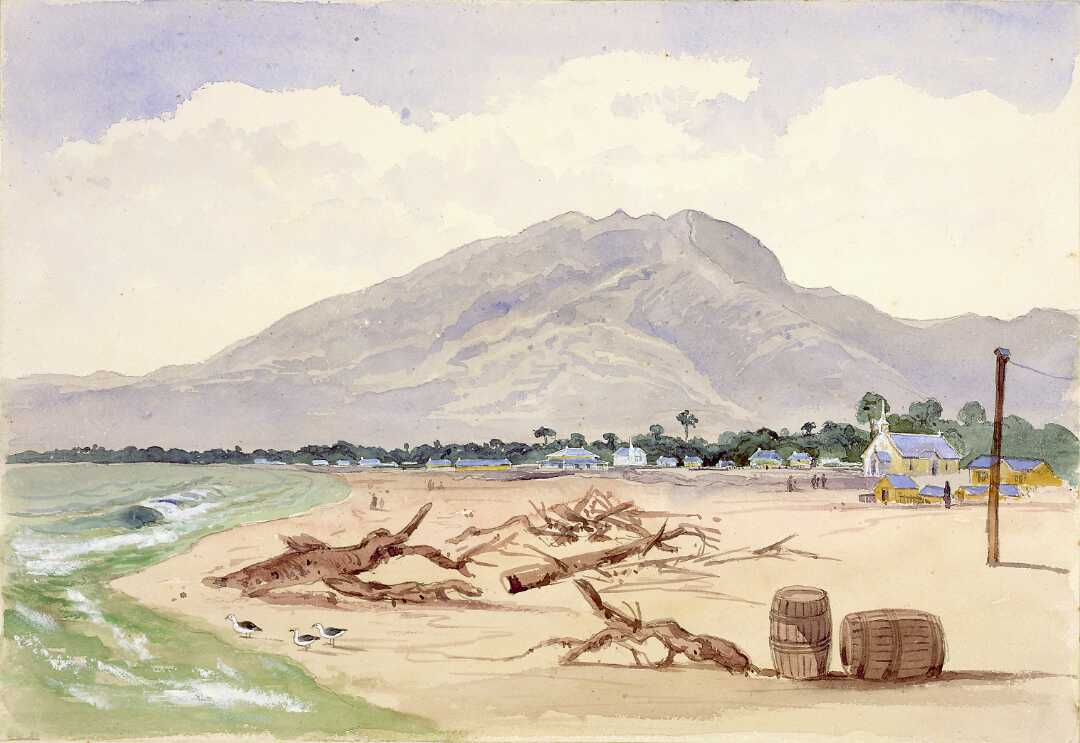
- Mount Rochfort with Westport in foreground (painted 1872)

Highest point
- Elevation: 1,040 m (3,410 ft)
- Coordinates: 41°46′44″S 171°44′24″E

Geography
- Location within New Zealand
- Location: South Island, New Zealand
- Region: West Coast
- Topo map: NZMS260 K29

Mount Rochfort is a mountain peak 1,040 metres (3,410 ft) in elevation, located approximately 10 km east of Westport in the Buller District on the West Coast of the South Island of New Zealand. It rises above the south-west portion of the Denniston Plateau and overlooks the town of Westport and the plains of the Buller River.

== Toponymy ==
Mount Rochfort was named after John Rochfort (1832–1893), who was a surveyor and engineer involved in mineral surveys in the Buller District. Rochfort was the first pākehā to climb the peak and Julius von Haast named it.

== Mount Rochfort Conservation Area ==
In 2018, the Minister of Conservation Eugenie Sage and Minister of Energy Resources Megan Woods declined an application to mine 12 hectares (30 acres) near Te Kuha, in the Mount Rochfort Conservation Area. The announcement including a statement about the conservation values of the area:

The Te Kuha area is one of the last two areas of intact, elevated Brunner coal measure ecosystems. It is an undisturbed area which is precious and unique and supports complex and diverse habitats for threatened plants and wildlife including great spotted kiwi, land snails and lizards.

The Mount Rochfort Conservation Area is land classified in the stewardship category by the Department of Conservation.

Mount Rochfort is one of two locations where the nationally critical moth Arctesthes avatar can be found.

== Access ==
There is a 4WD access road from the Denniston Plateau to the summit of Mount Rochford, for servicing a transmission site on the peak.

There is a water supply reserve for the town of Westport on the slopes of Mount Rochfort.

There is a lake to the north west called Lake Rochfort.
