= Kath Walker (scientist) =

New Zealand conservation scientist

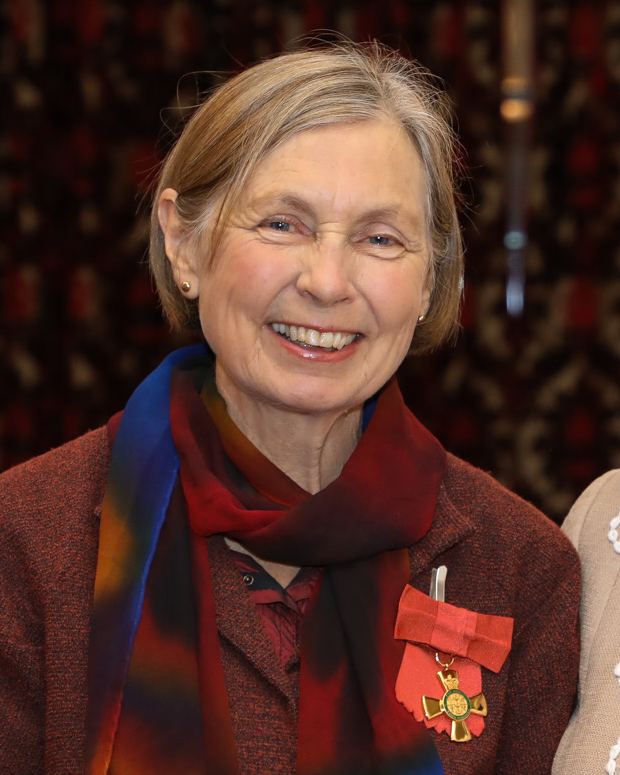
- Walker in 2023
- Born: 1955
- Awards: Officer of the New Zealand Order of Merit

Academic background
- Education: Massey University
- Thesis: Systematics and phylogeography of the large land snail Powelliphanta (2018)
- Doctoral advisor: Steven Trewick, Rod Hitchmough

Kathleen Joy Walker is a New Zealand conservation scientist and an expert on New Zealand snails. In 2023 Walker was appointed an Officer of the New Zealand Order of Merit for services to wildlife conservation.

== Conservation career ==
Walker joined the New Zealand Wildlife Service in 1981, and then worked for the Department of Conservation. Walker led the establishment of the Rotoiti Mainland Island sanctuary, and the creation of bird sanctuaries at Motuara and Chetwode Islands through the eradication of rodent pests. Walker is an expert on New Zealand's native snails, the giant carnivorous Powelliphanta. She conducted a national survey of the snails, and discovered a new species on Stockton Plateau, Powelliphanta augusta. She assisted in the efforts to maintain the snail populations in fridges once their habitat was destroyed by mining, and advocated for the restoration of their habitat. Walker completed a PhD titled Systematics and phylogeography of the large land snail Powelliphanta at Massey University in 2018. Her research reexamined the status of Powelliphanta in New Zealand, describing 20 distinct species and 59 subspecies.

Walker is a science advisor at the Department of Conservation. She led an advisory group that warned in 2024 of the likely extinction of many of New Zealand's native snails due to climate change and predation by rodents, pigs, hedgehogs and birds.

== Honours and awards ==
In the 2023 New Year's Honours Walker was appointed an Officer of the New Zealand Order of Merit for services to wildlife conservation.

== Personal life ==
Walker's partner is Graeme Elliott, advisory scientist at DOC. Since 1991 the two have often travelled to the subantarctic to study Gibson's albatross and Antipodean albatross populations.

== Selected works ==
- Walker, Kathleen Joy; Trewick, Steven Alexander; Barker, Gary Michael (2008). "Powelliphanta augusta, a new species of land snail, with a description of its former habitat, Stockton coal plateau, New Zealand". Journal of the Royal Society of New Zealand. 38 (3): 163–186. doi:10.1080/03014220809510553. Wikidata Q54576674.
- Walker, Kathleen Joy; Walton, Kerry; Edwards, Eric; Hitchmough, Rod; Payton, Ian J.; Barker, Gary Michael; Michel, Pascale (2024). "Conservation status of New Zealand indigenous terrestrial Gastropoda (slugs and snails) Part 3. Rhytididae (carnivorous snails), 2022" (PDF). New Zealand Threat Classification Series. 42: 1–32. ISSN 2324-1713. Wikidata Q124748983.
- Taylor, Graeme Arthur; Elliott, Graeme Peter; Walker, Kathleen Joy; Samhita Bose (2020). "Year-round distribution, breeding cycle, and activity of white-headed petrels (Pterodroma lessonii) nesting on Adams Island, Auckland Islands". Notornis. 67 (1): 369–386. ISSN 0029-4470. Wikidata Q124167383.
- Kalinka Rexer-Huber; Walker, Kathleen Joy; Elliott, Graeme Peter; Baker, Barry; Igor Debski; Jensz, Katrina; Paul M. Sagar; Thompson, David R.; Parker, Graham Christopher (2020). "Population trends of light-mantled sooty albatross (Phoebetria palpebrata) at Adams Island and trials of ground, boat, and aerial methods for population estimates". Notornis. 67 (1): 341–355. ISSN 0029-4470. Wikidata Q124166878.
- Baker, Barry; Elliott, Graeme Peter; French, Rebecca; Jensz, Katrina; Muller, Christopher; Walker, Kathleen Joy (2020). "Development of aerial monitoring techniques to estimate population size of great albatrosses (Diomedea spp.)". Notornis. 67 (1): 321–331. ISSN 0029-4470. Wikidata Q124161270.
- Walker, Kathleen Joy; Elliott, Graeme Peter; Kalinka Rexer-Huber; Parker, Graham; Paul M. Sagar; Peter J. McClelland (2020). "Shipwrecks and mollymawks: an account of Disappointment Island birds". Notornis. 67 (1): 213–245. ISSN 0029-4470. Wikidata Q124153136.
