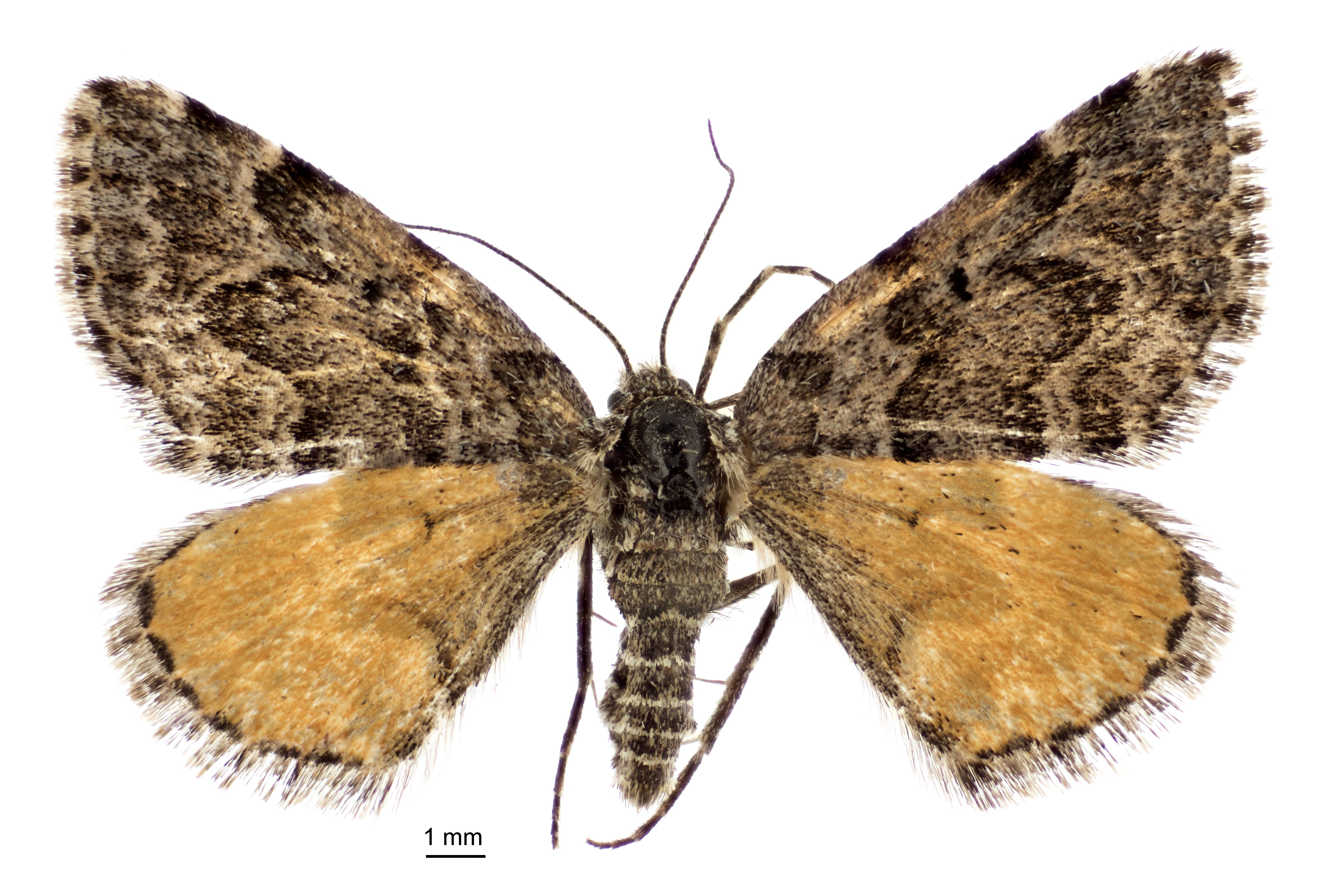
- Female
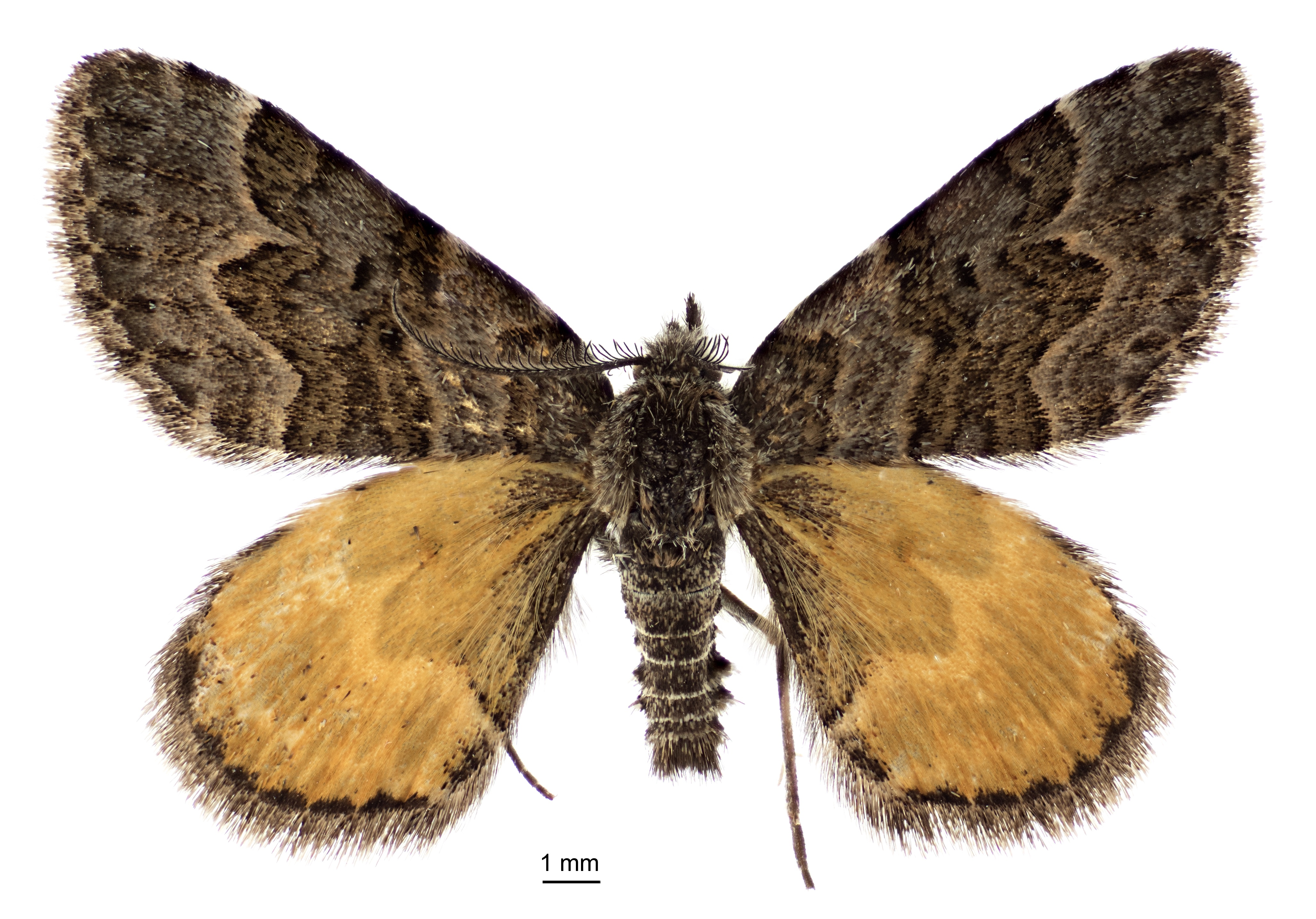
- Male

Scientific classification
- Kingdom: Animalia
- Phylum: Arthropoda
- Class: Insecta
- Order: Lepidoptera
- Family: Geometridae
- Genus: Arctesthes
- Species: A. titanica

Binomial name
- Arctesthes titanica Patrick, Patrick & Hoare, 2019
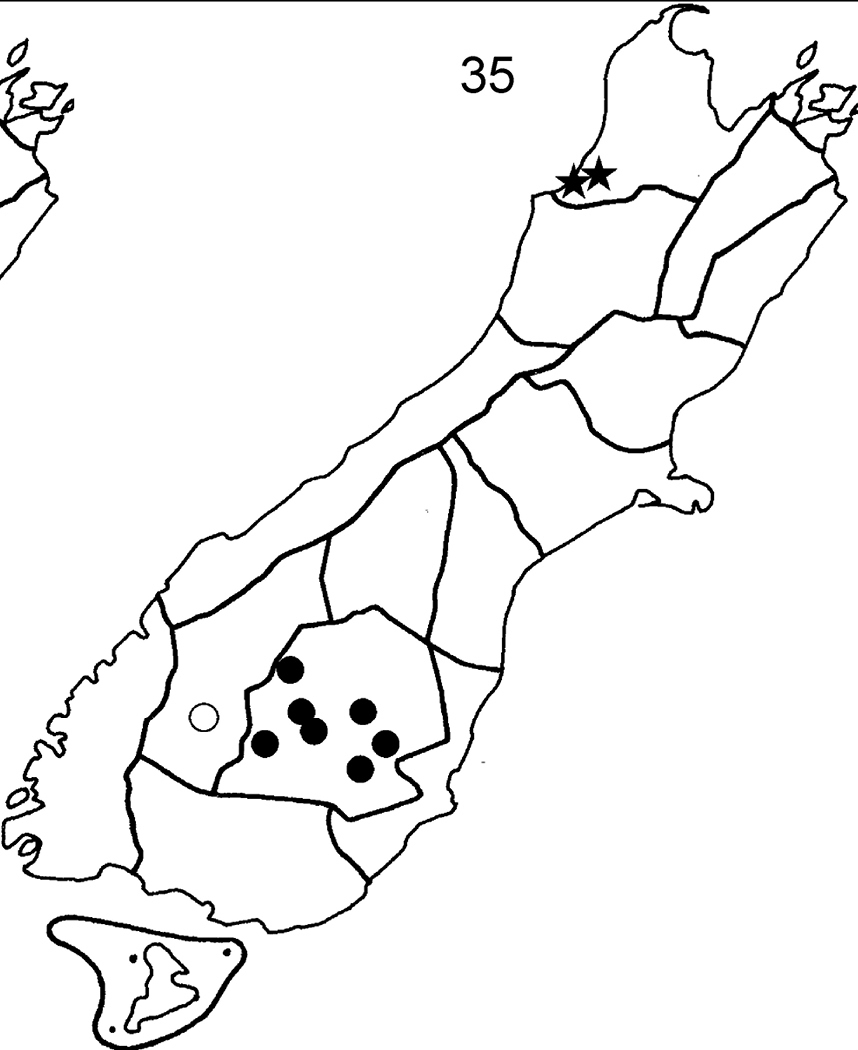
- A. titanica = open circle

= Arctesthes titanica =

Species of moth

Arctesthes titanica is a moth of the family Geometridae first described by Brian H. Patrick, Hamish J. H. Patrick and Robert J. B. Hoare in 2019. It is endemic to New Zealand. The species was named after the Titans of Greek mythology and recognizing the ship Titanic and the film of the same name.
