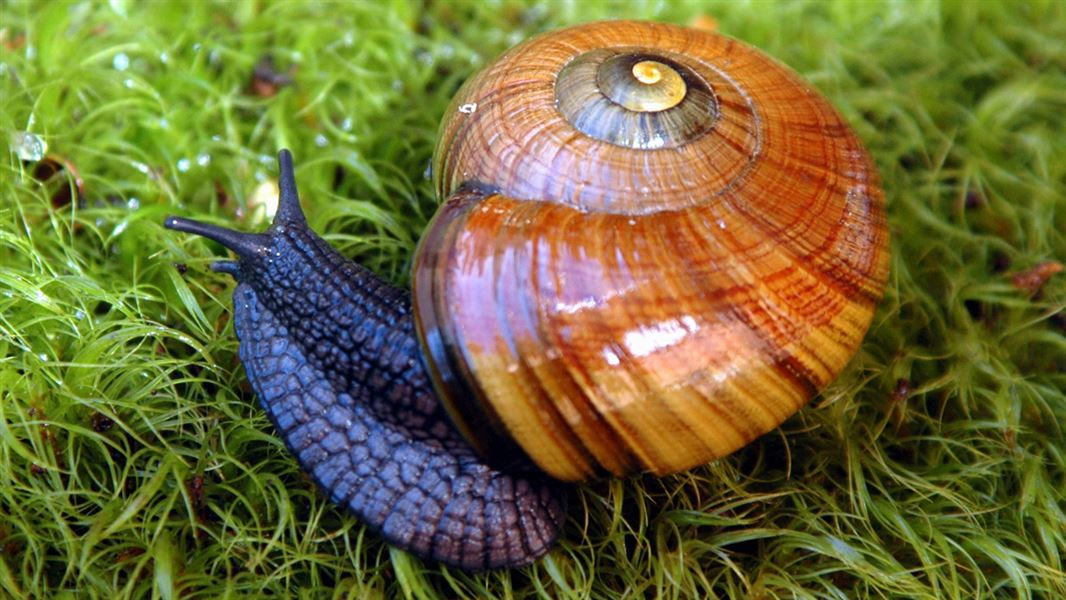
- A live Powelliphanta augusta from the upper Waimangaroa River

Conservation status
- Nationally Critical (NZ TCS)

Scientific classification
- Kingdom: Animalia
- Phylum: Mollusca
- Class: Gastropoda
- Order: Stylommatophora
- Family: Rhytididae
- Genus: Powelliphanta
- Species: P. augusta

Binomial name
- Powelliphanta augusta Walker, Trewick & Barker, 2008

Synonyms
- Powelliphanta "Augustus"

= Powelliphanta augusta =

Species of gastropod found in New Zealand

Powelliphanta augusta or the Mount Augustus snail, previously provisionally known as Powelliphanta "Augustus", is a species of large, carnivorous land snail, a terrestrial pulmonate gastropod mollusc in the family Rhytididae. Naturally occurring only on Mount Augustus near Westport on New Zealand's South Island, their entire habitat was destroyed by the expansion of the coal mine the Stockton Mine. The entire population was taken into captivity, in theory until their habitat was restored and they could be released. The state owned mining company Solid Energy was wound up in 2015 and habitat restoration has been unsuccessful, so the species' future is uncertain.

== Distribution ==
The species is endemic to the South Island of New Zealand. It was found only on the Mount Augustus ridgeline northeast of Westport, which has since been removed by mining operations of the state-owned company Solid Energy.

The species was first discovered in 1996 by members of the Nelson Botanical Society, however, the Department of Conservation (DOC) was unaware of its existence until 2004. Department of Conservation scientists initially thought that there appeared to be fewer than 1,000 of these snails.

== Reproduction ==
Mount Augustus snails are hermaphrodites, meaning they produce both male and female gametes. Each snail has a penis that extends through a genital pore below its head and can deposit sperm into another snail's pore during mating. Each snail can store the sperm and use it to fertilise its own eggs when ready. If necessary, a snail can also fertilise itself and reproduce asexually.

=== Laying eggs ===
The Mount Augustus snail lays eggs through a genital pore just below its head. Though the egg appears to be emerging from its neck, it does not come into contact with the snail's throat or respiratory system.

Sexually mature adults can lay around 5 eggs per year. Their eggs are usually between 5 and 6 millimetres (0.20 and 0.24 in) in diameter, but eggs as big as 12 millimetres (0.47 in) long have been observed. Their shells are made of calcium and are pink in color. They can take over a year to hatch.

=== Life span ===
Powelliphanta augusta snails reach sexual maturity around 8 years of age. They have been observed to live up to 25 years old in captivity. Snails who live at higher altitudes tend to mature slower than snails at lower altitudes.

== Conservation status ==
The species is listed as Nationally Critical on the New Zealand Threat Classification System. DOC has classified the species as conservation dependent, impacted by climate change, living in one location, and experiencing population fragmentation.

== Mining of habitat ==
From 2004, plans by Solid Energy to destroy the main habitat of Powelliphanta "Augustus" while mining for coal caused controversy (see Save Happy Valley Campaign). Solid Energy, whose past mining activities had already significantly reduced the species' habitat, planned to mine the skyline ridge that included Mount Augustus.

In May 2005 Solid Energy sought a permit from the New Zealand Department of Conservation to translocate some Powelliphanta "Augustus", but they intended to begin mining regardless of whether the permit was granted or not.

The Royal Forest and Bird Protection Society obtained a declaration in December 2005 from the High Court requiring Solid Energy to get permission from the Minister of Conservation and the Minister of Energy for the translocation, as well as any transfer of heavy machinery, and any impact on habitat. Permission was granted in April 2006 for this translocation plan.

This was condemned by Forest and Bird, by the Save Happy Valley Coalition and by the Green Party, in part because of significant doubts as to whether the translocation would succeed, and the lack of guarantee that this measure would protect the species from extinction. The numbers of this Powelliphanta species were at that time estimated to be fewer than 500, and their existing habitat covered 3 to 4 hectares (7.4 to 9.9 acres). The Wildlife Permit granted allowed Solid Energy to mine 96% of this area. There was also concern over the destruction of Powelliphanta habitat by the mining company OMYA on Mount Burnett, in Golden Bay.

== Translocations ==
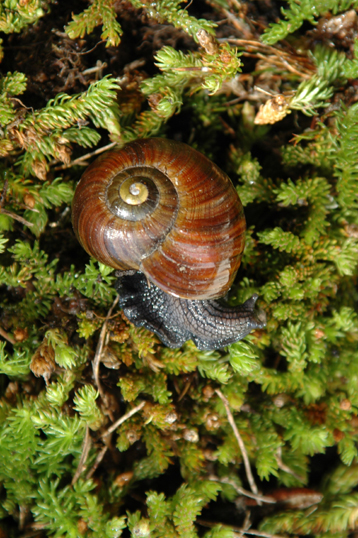
Powelliphanta augusta

Before the Stockton habitat was mined the Department of Conservation removed around 4,000 snails and relocated them to nearby sites with similar habitat. A further 2,000 were taken into captivity, stored in individual containers in a refrigerated shipping container at DOC headquarters in Hokitika. Each container had a substrate of moss and leaf litter, and each snail was fed earthworms of a suitable size each month, measured, and weighed.

In early December 2006, twenty snails removed from Solid Energy's opencast mine expansion at Stockton were released back into the wild. By late December 2006, one of the 20 translocated snails had been found dead. A further 20 snails collected from the ridgeline of the mine site were also released about 800 metres (2,600 ft) from where they were found into an area of the Stockton Plateau that will not be mined. On 8 January 2007 the Department of Conservation announced plans to release another 200 snails back into the wild at Stockton open-cast mine. Reintroductions of the snails from the captive population have continued.

In August 2010, Rod Morris reported in Forest and Bird on the status of P. augusta. Morris had visited the re-location site, just northwest of the original Mt. Augustus site, where the original soil and vegetation from Mt. Augustus had been transferred to. He observed that larger trees had died and introduced weed species such as gorse and rushes had invaded. Morris stated, "The once complex mosaic of dense, low sub-alpine scrub and deep undisturbed litter has gone." However, 1600 snails had been translocated from Hokitika to the re-created site. Another 2300 snails had been moved to two sites at Mt Rochfort. At each site, 50 snails were tagged with transponders, and these snails had a 30% rate of mortality after 18 months. Morris noted that Landcare Research considered that the snail populations would not survive that rate of mortality.

In April 2010, the captive population was 1,552 snails in three refrigerated rooms. In November 2011, 800 snails died in a tempurature-control accident when the thermostat, normally set to 10 °C, reset to 0 °C over a long weekend; 1600 survived. By March 2025 the population had grow to 1,884, with an additional 2,195 unhatched eggs, and the species had been observed on camera laying eggs for the first time.
