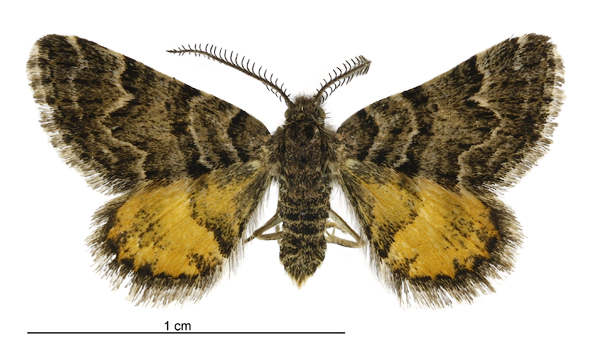
- Male
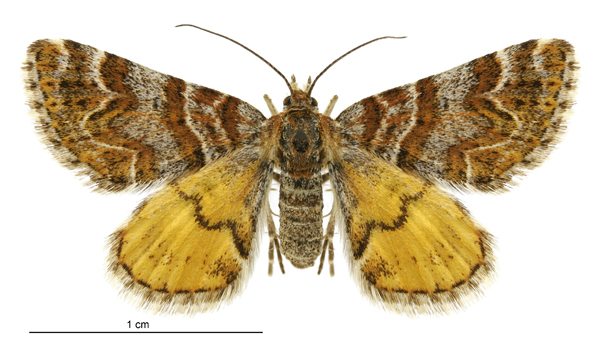
- Female

Scientific classification
- Kingdom: Animalia
- Phylum: Arthropoda
- Clade: Pancrustacea
- Class: Insecta
- Order: Lepidoptera
- Family: Geometridae
- Genus: Arctesthes
- Species: A. catapyrrha

Binomial name
- Arctesthes catapyrrha (Butler, 1877)
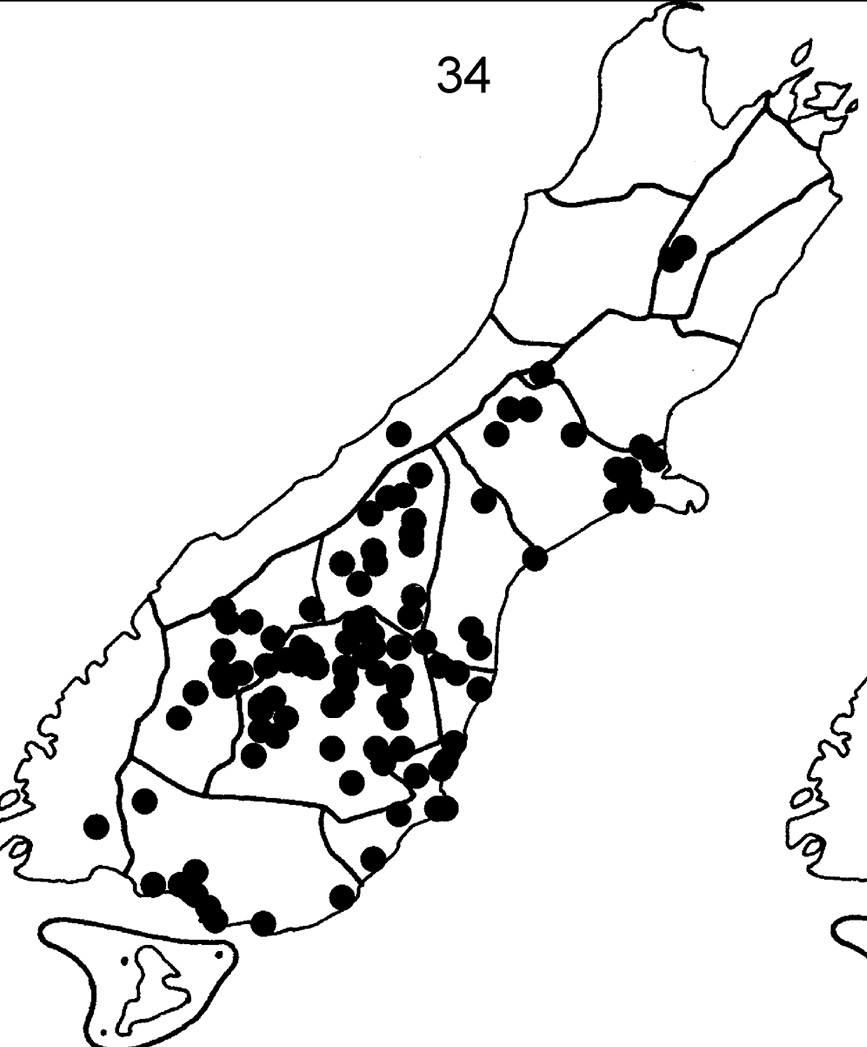

Synonyms
- Fidonia catapyrrha Butler, 1877; Stratonice catapyrrha (Butler, 1877); Notoreas catapyrrha (Butler, 1877); Coremia euclidiata Guenée, 1857; Lythria euclidiata (Guenée, 1857); Lythria catapyrrha (Butler, 1877); Arctesthes catapyrrha fasciata Prout, 1929; Arctesthes catapyrrha kaikourensis Prout, 1939

= Arctesthes catapyrrha =

Species of moth

Arctesthes catapyrrha is a species of moth in the family Geometridae. It is endemic to New Zealand.

== Taxonomy ==
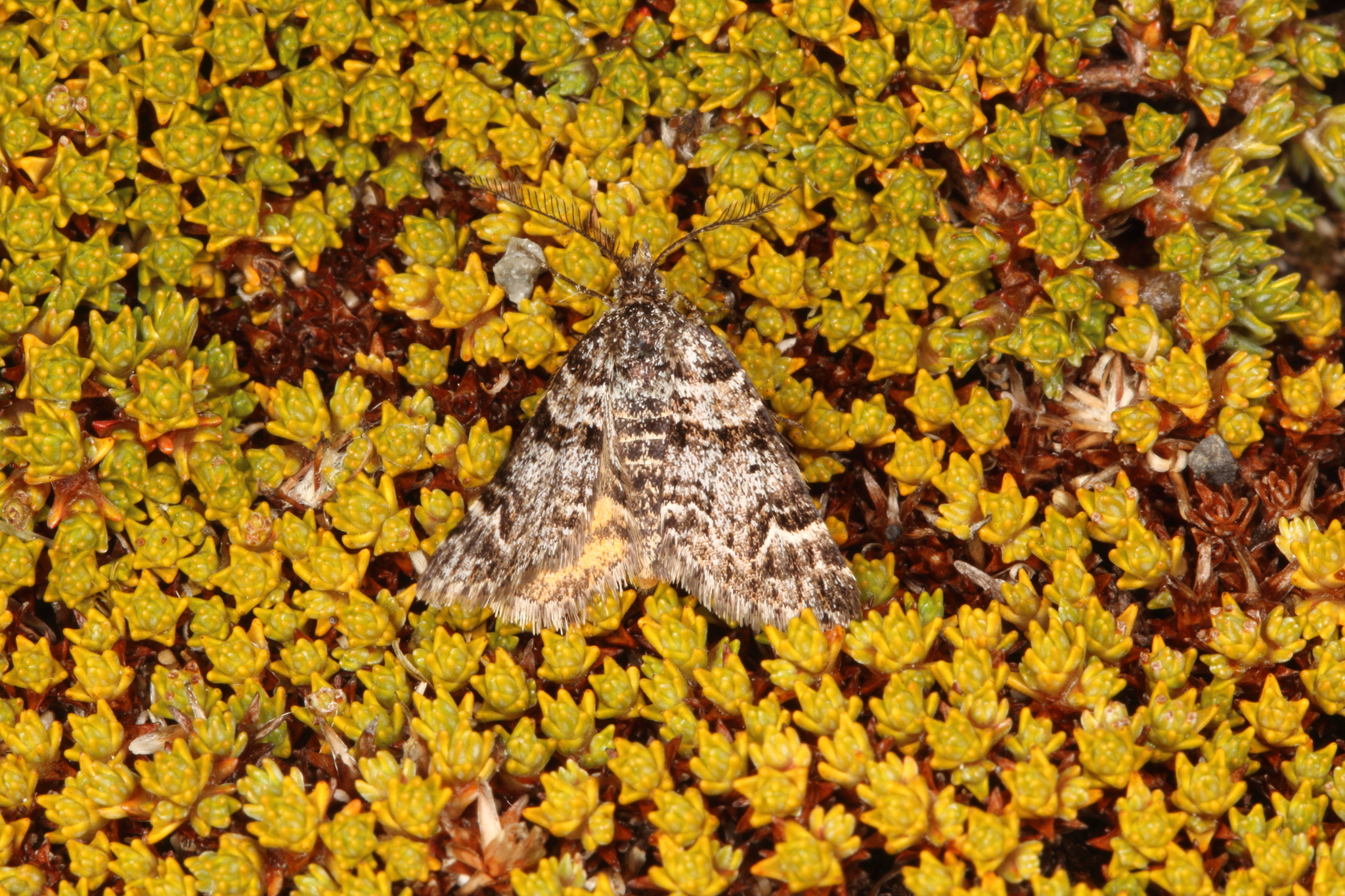

This species was first described by Arthur Gardiner Butler in 1877 using specimens collected by James Hector and J. D. Enys and named Fidonia catapyrrha. In 1884 Edward Meyrick placed this species in the newly described genus Stratonice. In 1885 Meyrick replaced this preoccupied name with Arctesthes. However also in 1885 Meyrick synonymised Arctesthes catapyrrha with Coremia euclidiata (now known as Chrysolarentia euclidiata). In 1898 George Hudson discussed and illustrated this species under the name Lythria euclidiata, following this error made by Meyrick. In 1912 George Blundell Longstaff corrected Meyrick's error. In 1917 Meyrick agreed with that correction. In 1928 Hudson again discussed and illustrated this species but this time, again following Meyrick, under the name Lythria catapyrrha. Robin C. Craw in 1986 reinstated the genus Arctesthes and placed this species within it. In 1988 J. S. Dugdale confirmed this placement and while doing so synonymised two forms, fasciata and kaikourensis, that had been previously named by Louis Beethoven Prout, into this species. In 2019 Brian and Hamish Patrick as well as Robert Hoare reviewed the genus Arctesthes and again confirmed this species placement within it. The male holotype specimen, collected at Castle Hill in Canterbury, is held at the Natural History Museum, London.

== Description ==
Butler described this species as follows:

♂,♀. Primaries above whitish, clouded and banded with brown; the principal markings are an angulated transverse subbasal dark brown band; two central bands forming a band, its inner edge subangulated, its outer edge very irregular, projecting within the median interspaces; an interrupted submarginal brown streak; a brown apical spot, and five oval marginal red spots enclosing black dots at their interior extremities; fringe alternately brown and white; secondaries ochre-yellow, with a central angulated bifid band, an angulated submarginal streak, and the outer border composed of dark grey scales; a marginal series of black dots; fringe grey; body brown; abdomen banded with white : primaries below stramineous; an angulated postmedian band, bifid above the median nervure, a dot at end of cell, an irregular transverse tapering subapical streak, and the centre of the outer border black-brown; a subapical spot, and the apical border pale ferruginous; a spot on the costa, and an irregular apical submarginal streak, white; fringe alternately brown and white; secondaries brick-red; a central longitudinal cuneiform streak proceeding from the base to near the outer margin, and the abdominal border, white; a spot close to the base, a central angulated transverse band, a claviform submarginal streak, and a spot on the outer margin, black; fringe grey; body below whitish. Expanse of wings 8 1/2 lines.

Dugdale mentions that the male holotype specimen collected in Canterbury has the typical colouration for that area of hindwings strongly coloured with red below. Specimens in Otago have less red colouration and the discal strip is not red.

== Distribution ==
This species is endemic to New Zealand. A. catapyrrha is widespread and is found in open areas from coastal to alpine locations. It prefers stony habitat such as shingle riverbeds and stony fields. It has been observed in the Mackenzie Country, Kaitorete Spit, near the Waimakariri River, and in Central Otago.

== Life stages ==
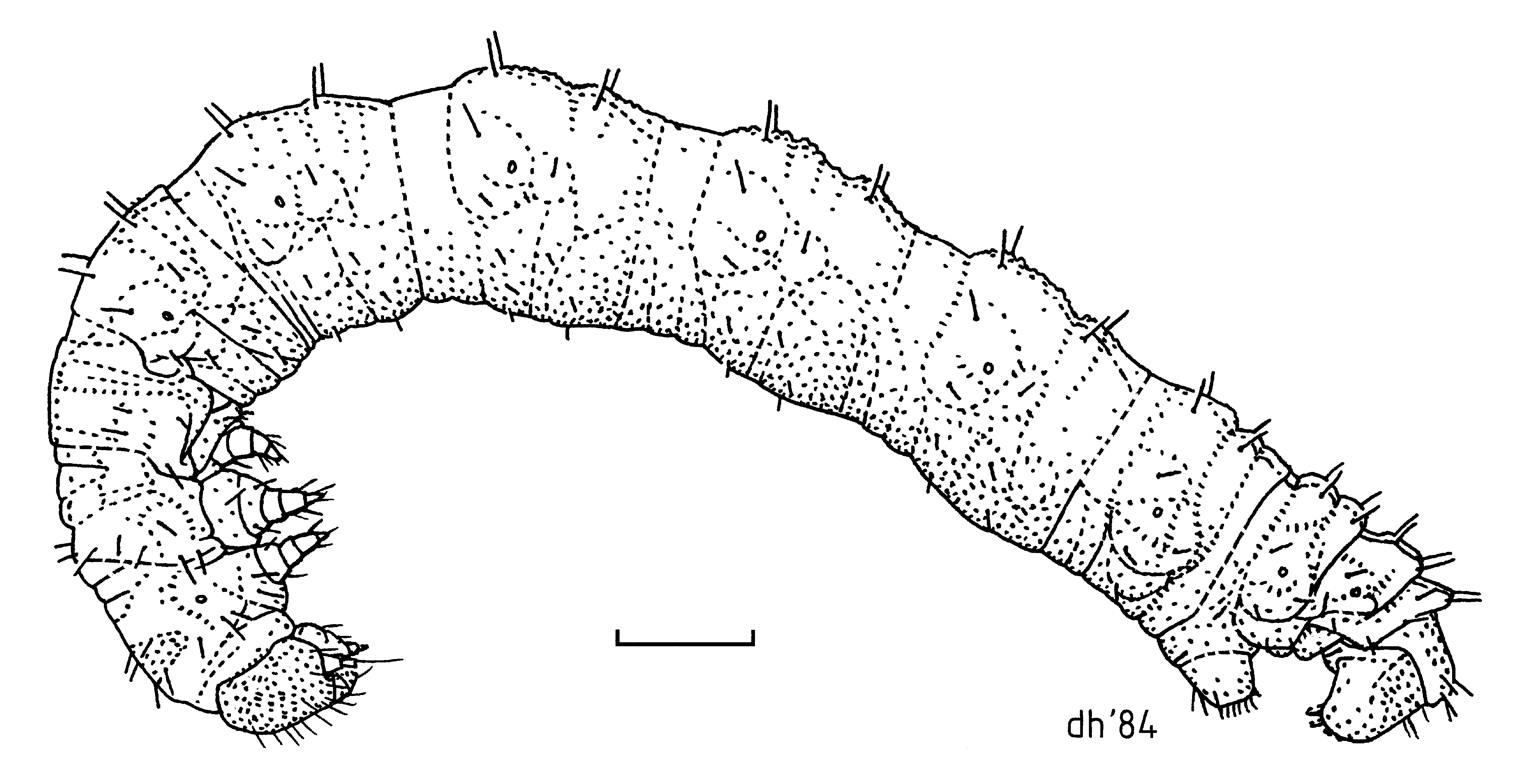
Arctesthes catapyrrha larva

A. catapyrrha is a day flying moth. Adult moths can be seen between October and March.

== Host species ==
Larvae of A. catapyrrha feed on a wide range of low herbs including Plantago species and on Raoulia australis. The adults of this moth are known to pollinate Raoulia subsericea.
