= Mount Augustus (New Zealand) =

Hill in New Zealand

Highest point
- Elevation: 1,010 m (3,310 ft)
- Coordinates: 41.6779°S 171.8570°E

Geography
- Location: South Island, New Zealand

Mount Augustus was a mountain on the West Coast of New Zealand.

It was the locality for a type specimen of the Powelliphanta augusta species of carnivorous snails previously known as Powelliphanta "Augustus". The mountain, part of the Stockton mine, was removed to recover the underlying coal.
