= Conservation in New Zealand =

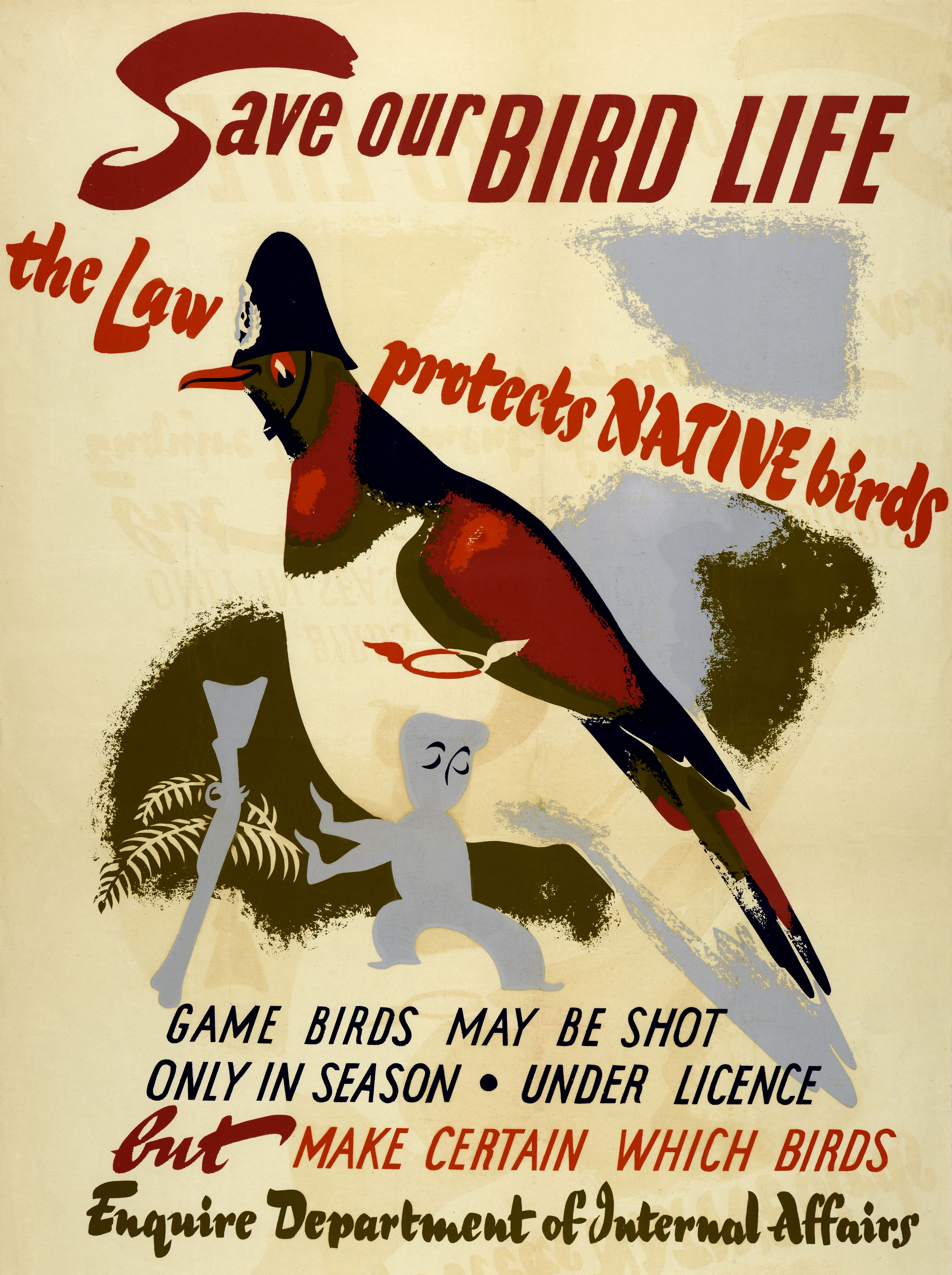
A 1959 poster made by the Department of Internal Affairs reminding immigrants – particularly from the UK post-WW2 – that native birds are protected under law

Nature conservation in New Zealand has a history associated with both Māori and Europeans. Both groups of people caused a loss of species and both altered their behaviour to a degree after realising their effect on indigenous flora and fauna.

== Protected areas ==
New Zealand has thirteen national parks, forty-four marine reserves and many other protected areas for the conservation of biodiversity. The introduction of many invasive species is threatening the indigenous biodiversity, since the geographical isolation of New Zealand led to the evolution of plants and animals that did not have traits to protect against predation. New Zealand has a high proportion of endemic species, so pest control is generally regarded as a high priority.

The New Zealand Department of Conservation administers approximately 30% of New Zealand's land, along with less than 1% of the country's marine environment, for conservation and recreational purposes. It has published lists, under the New Zealand Threat Classification System, of flora and fauna that is at risk or declining, which are included in national and regional plans.

== Legislation ==
The Conservation Act 1987 is New Zealand's principal legislation concerning the conservation of indigenous biodiversity. The Act established the Department of Conservation, Fish and Game, and complements the National Parks Act 1980 and the Reserves Act 1977.

The Wildlife Act 1953 covers the protection and control of wild animals, and provides for wildlife sanctuaries, refuges and management reserves.

== Conservation successes ==
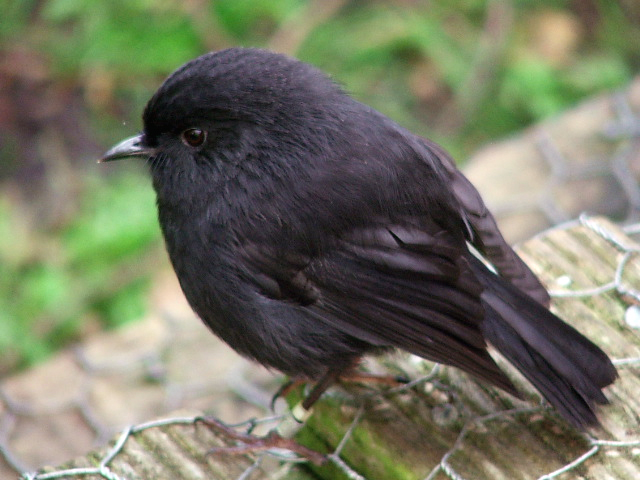
A black robin (Petroica traversi). Saving the species was a major conservation success story.

The black robin (Petroica traversi) was saved from the brink of extinction by a conservation effort led by Don Merton of the New Zealand Wildlife Service. However all black robins that survive today are descended from a single female, therefore the species has little genetic diversity.

The two species of saddleback had each been reduced to a small population on a single island: Hen Island for the North Island saddleback, and Taukihepa / Big South Cape Island off Stewart Island for the South Island saddleback. After a programme of translocation to other predator-free island reserves, the population of the South Island saddleback has increased from 36 birds to over 1,200 birds on 15 islands. The North Island subspecies had increased from 500 birds to over 6,000 birds on 12 islands. This has taken both subspecies from critically endangered on the IUCN Red List to near threatened for the South Island saddleback and least concern for the North Island saddleback.

The brown teal (Anas chlorotis) recovery programme has successfully improved the population status from endangered to near threatened on the IUCN Red List.

The North Island kōkako population has increased from a low point of around 350 pairs to over 1600 pairs in 23 populations around the North Island.

== Conservation issues ==
=== Deforestation ===
Most of the current 11.9 million hectares of agricultural land had been cleared, representing around 44% of the total land area of New Zealand. Initial attempts to decrease the scale of further deforestation, such as Forestry Rights Registration Act 1983 that created 'forestry rights', have been argued to only be moderately successful. However, they created world class structures of data collection and property rights that made way first for an amendment to the 1949 Forests Act in 1993 and later to the Climate Change Response Act 2002. New Zealand's patterns of greenhouse gas emissions are similar to Scandinavian countries, in that land use and land use change and forestry are amongst the most significant contributors. Forestry came to be seen as main tool in meeting New Zealand's Kyoto Protocol targets. Accordingly, REDD programmes (reducing emissions from deforestation and forest degradation) were implemented, whereby reforestation and deforestation was tied carbon emissions credits and traded (ETS) and commercial carbon-sink forests were planted. Perhaps due to the government's initial control over REDD and the trade in carbon credits there was initially an increase in deforestation and it was not until private forestry owners gained access to the trading scheme and to carbon credits that the scheme started to produce reductions in deforestation.

=== Endangered native species ===
During the relatively short occupation of New Zealand by humans a large number of species have been made extinct due to predation by introduced species, hunting, and the loss of habitat. Many extant species are under threat because of past and ongoing human activities.

One example is the Cromwell chafer beetle (Prodontria lewisi), which is on the IUCN Red List of critically endangered species. A reserve was created in 1983 to protect its habitat. More recent examples are the Hector's and Maui's dolphins, which are under threat from the fishing industry.

=== 1080 pesticide ===
The use of 1080 (sodium fluoroacetate) as a pesticide is a contentious issue. 1080 is used with carrots and cereal pellets to control the common brushtail possum, an introduced animal pest.

== Funding ==
As well as government funding for conservation efforts money also comes from numerous NGOs and private individuals. The Nature Heritage Fund and the Community Conservation Fund are both government funded.

== Conservation organisations ==
Conservation organisations began to form from the 19th century. Scenery Preservation Societies formed in some of the Provinces.

An early conservation lobby group was the Royal Forest and Bird Protection Society of New Zealand, which is now the foremost environmental organisation involved in conservation advocacy in New Zealand. In recent years numerous conservation, landcare and activist groups have formed including:

- Beech Forest Action Committee
- Dancing Star Foundation
- Endangered Species Foundation of New Zealand
- Live Ocean
- Maruia Society
- Native Forest Action
- Native Forest Action Council
- Save Happy Valley Coalition
- Trees for Survival

== Conservation awards ==
- Loder Cup
- Wellington Conservation Awards
- The Don Merton Conservation Pioneer Award (named after Don Merton)

== See also ==
- Acclimatisation societies in New Zealand
- Whaling in New Zealand
- Project Crimson, a conservation initiative to promote the protection of pōhutukawa and rātā
- List of extinct animals of New Zealand
- List of extinct plants of New Zealand
