= Maruia Declaration =

The Maruia Declaration was a public petition calling for the immediate phasing out of the logging of virgin native forest in New Zealand.

In October 1971 the New Zealand Government proposed to harvest large areas of native South Island lowland beech forest with half the cleared area to be converted to exotic Pinus radiata. The native forest harvesting prompted the formation of new environmental groups such as the Beech Forest Action Committee (later the Native Forest Action Council, the Maruia Society and then the Ecologic Foundation). On 4 July 1975, the Royal Forest and Bird Protection Society of New Zealand and the Beech Forest Action Committee started the Maruia Declaration as a public petition demanding an end to native forest logging and legal recognition of native forests.

In 1977 environmental groups presented the petition to Parliament carrying 341,160 signatures. It repeated and expanded on previous recommendations in 1937 by Captain Ernest Valentine Sanderson that the New Zealand Government establish protected forests and that commercial forestry would be compelled by legislation to manage the forests as a perpetual crop without interfering with their scenic value. The Declaration set out the groups’ forest conservation objectives and became the basis for a continuing public campaign against natural forest logging.

The six principles set out in the Declaration were:

- Native forests, wherever they remain, need recognition and protection in law.
- The wholesale burning of indigenous forests and wildlife has no place in a civilized society.
- The logging of virgin forests should be phased out by 1978.
- Our remaining publicly owned native forests should be placed in the hands of an organization that has a clear and undivided responsibility to protect them.
- To reduce commercial pressures on native forests, the growing of fine quality exotic and native timbers on land not presently forested should be given encouragement.
- It is prudent to be conservative in our consumption of these forest products, especially newsprint and packaging paper, which make heavy demands on our precious resources of land, energy and water.
