= Moturau Moana =

Public garden in New Zealand

Coordinates: 46.889°S 168.134°E

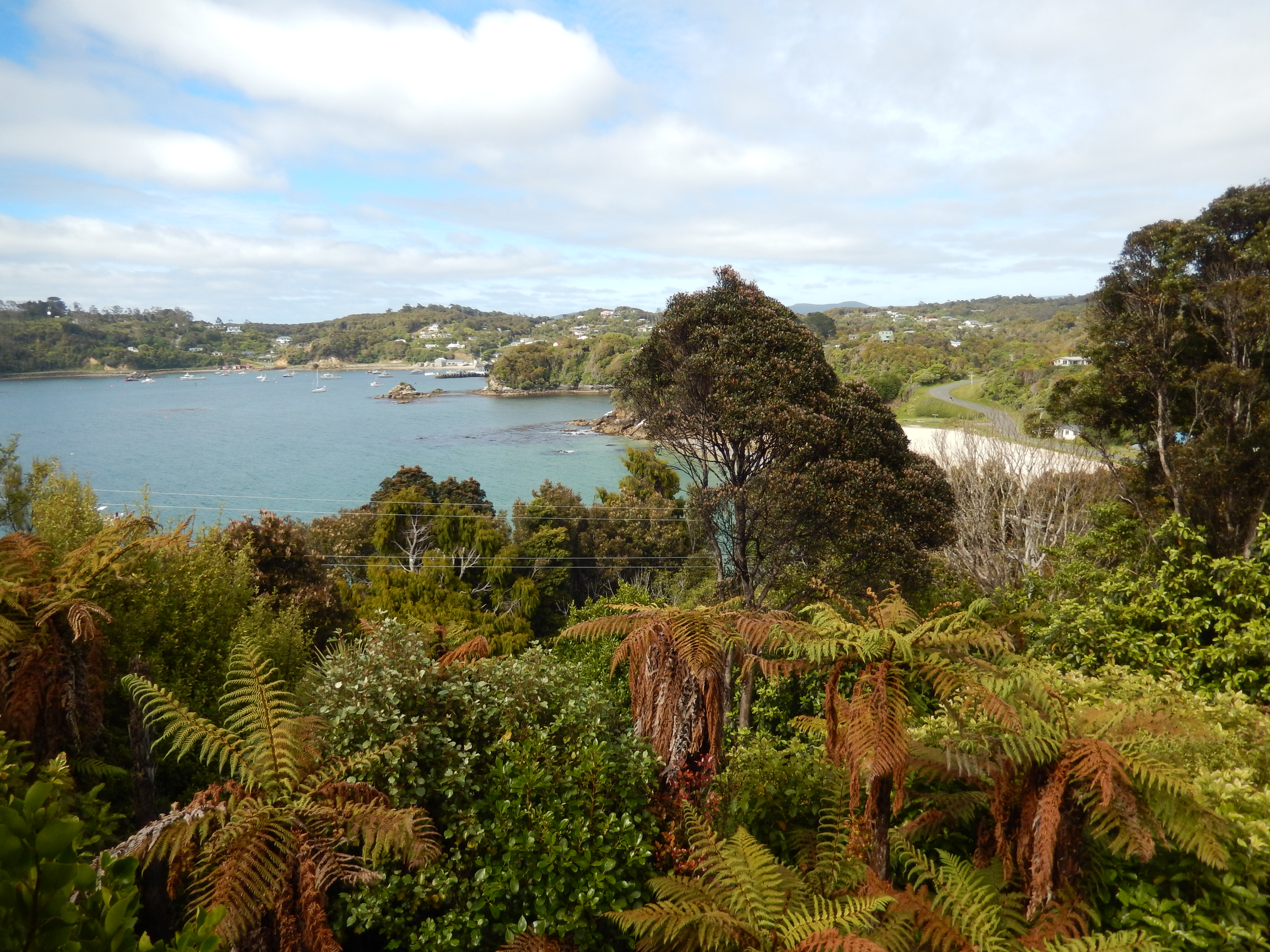
Halfmoon Bay from Moturau Moana

Moturau Moana on Stewart Island is New Zealand's southernmost public garden. It was gifted to the government of New Zealand by Noeline Baker in 1940 and is today administered by the Department of Conservation.

== History ==
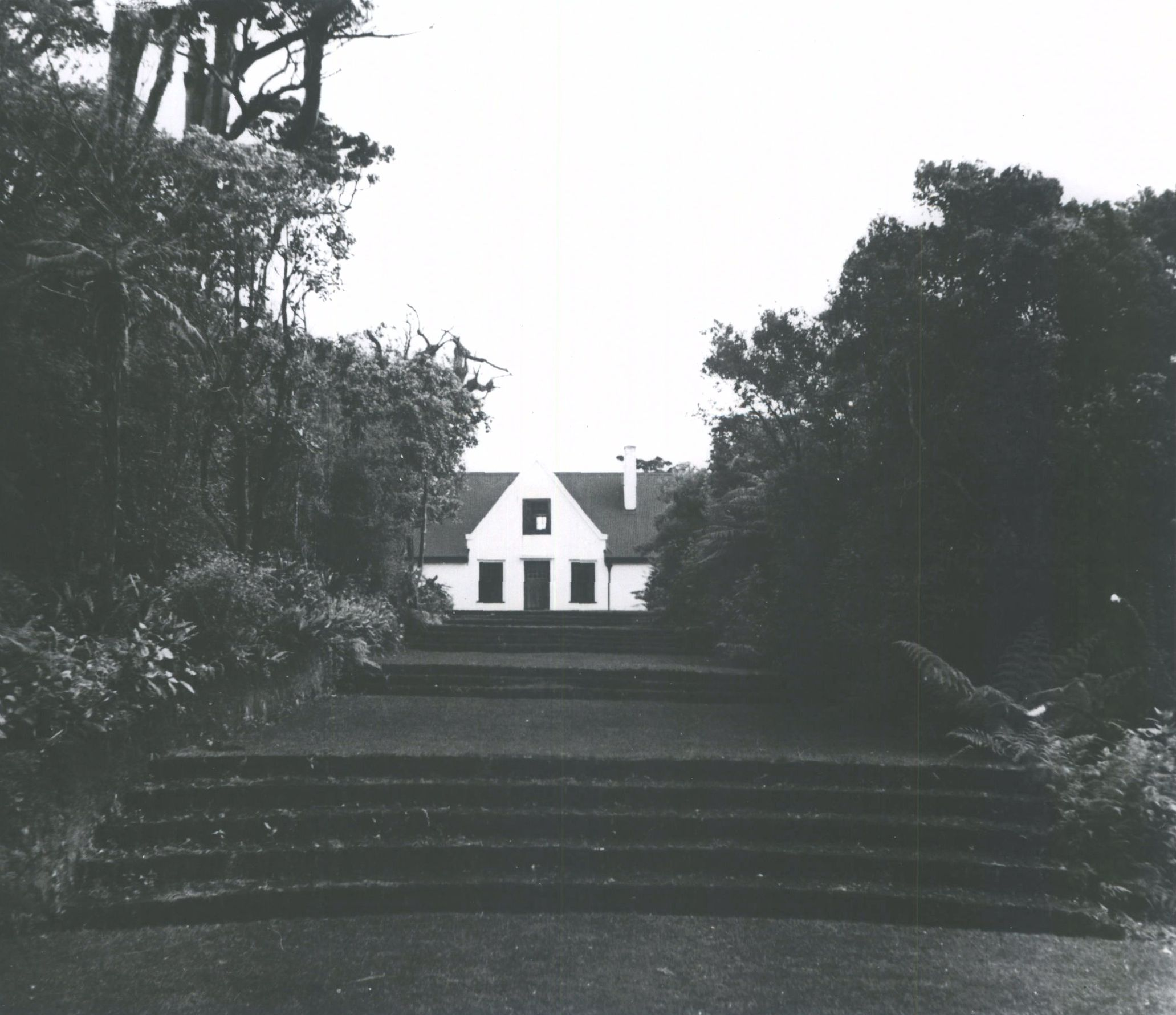
Moturoa Moana homestead

Noeline Baker (1878–1958), who was born in Christchurch, lived in England from 1896 to 1930. She returned to New Zealand to write her father's memoirs and spent time on Stewart Island. According to her biographical entry in the Dictionary of New Zealand Biography, she purchased the 34.5 acres (14.0 ha) of land clad with bush and overlooking Halfmoon Bay at that time, but during a speaking tour in Auckland in April 1940, she appeared to imply that her father purchased the land for her at her birth. She had a homestead built in 1934–35 in a Dutch colonial style and called it Moturau Moana, which is Māori and means "islands of bush above the sea". Baker drew inspiration from an acquaintance, British garden designer Gertrude Jekyll, and created a garden based on New Zealand flora. She used a list compiled by botanist Leonard Cockayne based on his 1907 visit to Stewart Island to grow all the island's indigenous plants in her garden.

Baker tried to gift Moturau Moana to the University of Otago and the Canterbury University College, but both organisations declined due to the ongoing maintenance costs. In November 1940, it was reported that Moturau Moana had been given to the Crown as a botanical research station. 32 acres (13 ha) were designated as a scenic reserve a month later just before Christmas. At Baker's request, the reserve was named in her father's name. Baker continued to live in the house, but on 7 December 1948, she handed the keys to her house to the minister of lands, Jerry Skinner, in an official ceremony. For her botanical work at Moturau Moana, Baker was awarded the Loder Cup in 1949. Baker had another cottage built for herself on Stewart Island, but she later purchased a house in Nelson where she stayed over winter. She died on Stewart Island in 1958. Her homestead, for a long time a major tourist attraction, burned down in 1967.

Moturau Moana was at first administered by the Department of Internal Affairs, followed by the New Zealand Forest Service, and upon its disestablishment in 1987, by the Department of Conservation.

== Location ==
Moturau Moana is located on the north side of Halfmoon Bay. Near Oban.
