= Violet Rucroft =

New Zealand naturalist, educator, and conservationist (1902–1986)

Violet Briffault QSM
- Born: Violet Ada Rucroft; 26 December 1902; Palmerston North, New Zealand
- Died: 2 May 1986 (aged 83); Whakatāne, New Zealand
- Occupation: Music teacher
- Known for: Conservation work
- Spouse: Harold Lister Briffault (m. 1969; died 1979)
- Awards: Loder Cup (1971), Queen's Service Medal (1980)

Violet Ada Briffault QSM (née Rucroft; 26 December 1902 – 2 May 1986) was a New Zealand naturalist, educator, and conservationist. She is known for her leadership in the organisation Forest and Bird and for advocating to conserve Te Urewera National Park. Rucroft served as the president and founder of the Whakatāne branch of Forest and Bird. She was named an honorary park ranger of Te Urewera National Park in 1962, and was awarded the Loder Cup and the Queen's Service Medal for her conservation work.

== Early life and musical career ==
Briffault was born Violet Ada Rucroft on 26 December 1902 in Palmerston North, to Alice Maud and John William Rucroft.

In 1929, Rucroft travelled to London to study piano under Frederick Moore and organ under Stanley Marchant at the Royal Academy of Music. She returned to New Zealand, and became president of the newly formed Hamilton Music Students' Association, and the New Zealand representative of the School of English Church Music. She taught music at Waikato Diocesan School for Girls for two years before returning back to England in early 1936, where she remained until 1947. During that time, she taught at Woodford County High School, wrote "A Survey of Music in New Zealand: Its Weaknesses and Its Opportunities" for the Proceedings of the Musical Association, and published arrangements of Māori songs.

Rucroft returned to New Zealand in 1947, taking up the position of music mistress at Woodford House. After moving to Whakatāne, she became a music teacher at Whakatane High School.

== Conservation work and awards ==
Rucroft became involved in local conservation efforts at age 47 by joining Forest and Bird in 1949. In 1956, she founded the Whakatāne branch of the organisation. She started the Rucroft Petition in 1959 to stop timber milling in Te Urewera National Park. In 10 weeks, the petition received 19,804 signatures and gained recognition from the New Zealand government. Public support for the petition resulted in restrictions on milling in Te Urewera National Park and protections for Māori land, such as the Manuoha and Paharakeke blocks. In addition to campaigning, she led tree planting efforts in Whakatāne and taught students about native flora. In recognition of her contributions to Te Urewera National Park, Rucroft was made an honorary park ranger in 1962. In 1971, she was awarded the Loder Cup for her devotion to native New Zealand flora for 20 years, and her efforts in establishing them in public and private gardens in the Whakatāne area. In the 1980 New Year Honours, Rucroft received the Queen's Service Medal for community service.

== Death and legacy ==
Rucroft died on 2 May 1986, at the age of 83. The Vi Briffault Reserve, a park on the outskirts of Coromandel, was named after her to honour her legacy of conservation work.
