= Progressive Green Party (New Zealand) =

- Founded: 9 August 1995
- Dissolved: c. 1998
- Split from: Green Party of Aotearoa New Zealand
- Succeeded by: Bluegreens
- Ideology: Eco-capitalism; Environmentalism

The Progressive Green Party was an environmentalist political party in New Zealand in the 1990s. It was a "blue-green" party – that is, one that is economically right-wing ("blue"), rather than left-wing ("red"), as well as environmentalist ("green").

== History ==
The Party was established on 9 August 1995 as a splinter group of the larger Green Party. The founders of the Progressive Greens were unhappy at the direction taken by the Green Party, which they believed was too left-wing. The Progressive Greens particularly opposed the Green Party's membership in the Alliance, a broad left-wing coalition. The party was led by environmental businessman Rob Fenwick (Living Earth Ltd) and included prominent environmentalists including Stephen Rainbow (a former Wellington city councillor), Guy Salmon (head of the Maruia Society, forerunner to today's Ecologic Foundation), and Gary Taylor (a former Waitemata city councillor).

In the 1996 election, conducted under the new MMP system, the Progressive Green Party won 0.26% of the vote, considerably below what they had hoped for, and had no members elected to Parliament. The Party did not contest any further elections, and eventually disbanded. In December 1998 the Progressive Greens were de-registered by the Electoral Commission. Many of the party's members are now associated with the Bluegreens, an environmental "task force" within the National Party – Fenwick was the first convener of the Bluegreens and went on to co-found the NZ Business Council for Sustainable Development. Stephen Rainbow and Guy Salmon stood as list candidates for the National Party in the 1999 election and 2002 election, respectively, but were not elected. Gary Taylor re-established and led the Environmental Defence Society.

== See also ==
- Eco-capitalism
- Teal Deal
- Sustainable New Zealand Party
- Liberals for Forests
- Progressive Green Party (disambiguation)
