= Loder Cup =

New Zealand conservation award

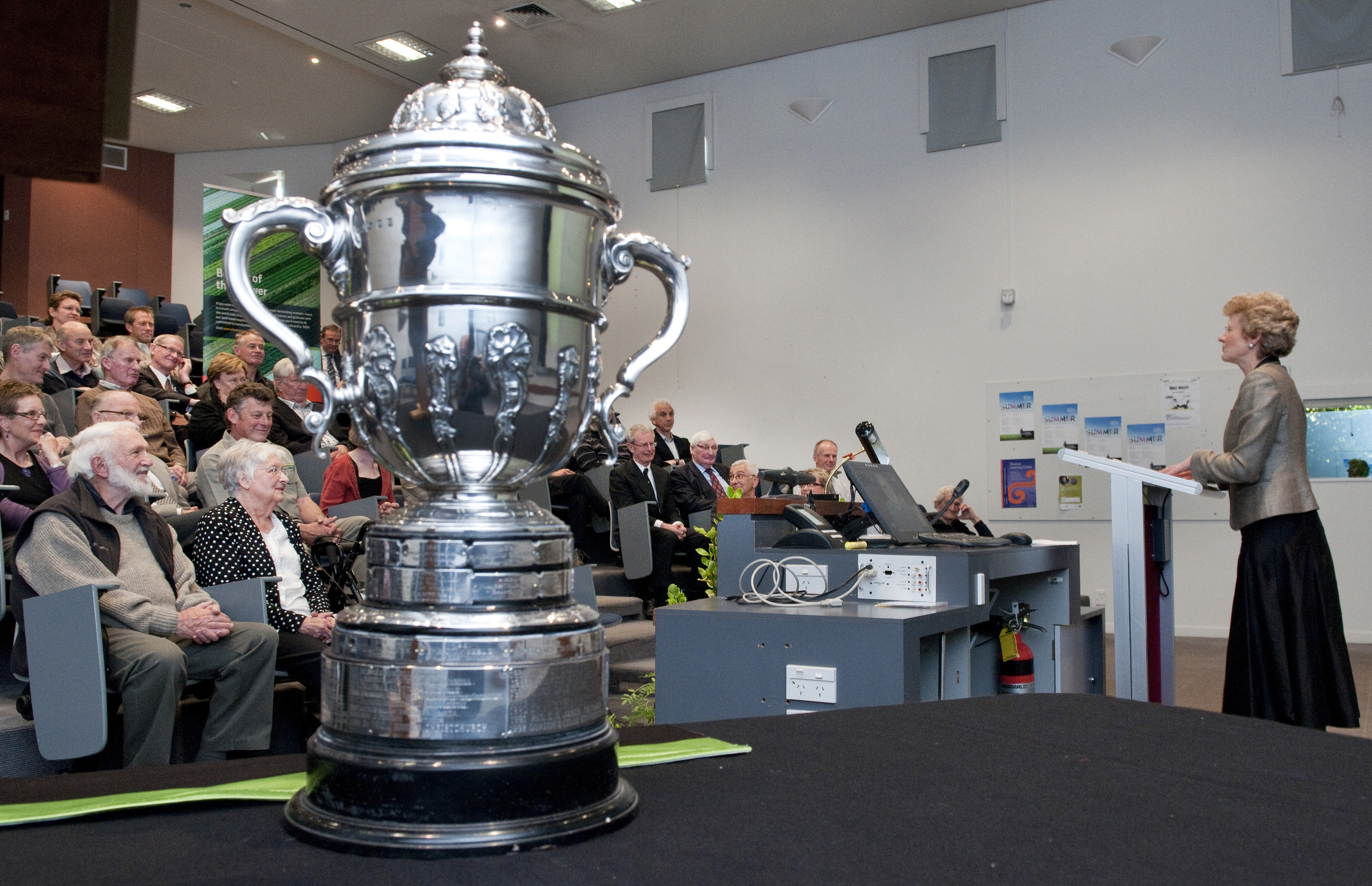
- Presentation of the Loder Cup in 2010
- Description: Investigate, promote, retain, and cherish indigenous flora
- Country: New Zealand
- Presented by: Minister of Conservation

The Loder Cup is a New Zealand conservation award. It was donated by Gerald Loder, 1st Baron Wakehurst in 1926 to "encourage and honour New Zealanders who work to investigate, promote, retain and cherish our indigenous flora". The Minister of Conservation awards the Loder Cup to a person or group of people who best represent the objectives of the Cup.

== Recipients ==
The Loder Cup has been awarded to the following individuals and groups:

- 1929 – Duncan and Davies Ltd, New Plymouth
- 1930 – Henry Bennett and son
- 1931 – Henry Bennett and son
- 1933 – T. Waugh and son
- 1934 – Lord Bledisloe
- 1935 – Trustees of R. C. Bruce
- 1936 – John Scott Thomson & George Simpson
- 1937 – Auckland Institute & Museum and Lucy Cranwell
- 1938 – Elizabeth Knox Gilmer
- 1939 – W. A. Thomson
- 1940 – P. H. Johnson
- 1941 – Edward Earle Vaile
- 1942 – A. W. Wastney
- 1943 – James Speden
- 1944 – Norman Potts
- 1945 – Walter Boa Brockie
- 1946 – Royal Forest & Bird Protection Society and Val Sanderson
- 1947 – N. R. W. Thomas
- 1948 – Andrew Davidson Beddie
- 1949 – Noeline Baker
- 1950 – Arthur Paul Harper
- 1951 – Lance McCaskill
- 1952 – Marguerite Crookes
- 1953 – Pérrine Moncrieff
- 1954 – Norman L. Elder
- 1955 – Michael Christian Gudex
- 1956 – Frank Singleton Holman
- 1957 – Frederick William Lokan
- 1958 – Ernest Corbett
- 1959 – Charles Cameron
- 1960 – William Marton
- 1961 – Charles Thomas Keeble
- 1962 – Bernard H. M. Teague
- 1963 – Nancy Adams
- 1964 – David Alfred Bathgate
- 1965 – Arthur Farnell
- 1966 – Oliver Hunter
- 1967 – John Salmon
- 1968 – Victor C. Davies
- 1969 – Pat Devlin
- 1970 – Muriel E. and William E. Fisher
- 1971 – Violet Briffault
- 1972 – Arthur David Mead
- 1973 – Katie Reynolds
- 1974 – Alexander Walter Anderson
- 1975 – Alan Mark
- 1976 – Waipahihi Botanical Society, Taupo
- 1977 – Reginald Ivan Bell
- 1978 – Lawrence J. Metcalf
- 1979 – Roger & Christina Sutton
- 1980 – Whangarei Native Forest & Bird Protection Society (Inc.)
- 1981 – Raymond H. Mole
- 1982 – Arthur William Ericson
- 1983 – Roy J. Peacock
- 1984 – Eric Godley
- 1985 – Audrey Eagle
- 1986 – Roderick Syme
- 1987 – Hugh Wilson
- 1988 – Arthur Blair Cowan
- 1989 – no award
- 1990 – Brian Molloy
- 1991 – Reginald Janes
- 1992 – Gordon and Celia Stephenson
- 1993 – Michael Greenwood
- 1994 – Peter Johnson
- 1995 – David Given
- 1996 – Native Forests Restoration Trust
- 1997 – Isabel Morgan
- 1998 – Supporters of Tiritiri Matangi Island
- 1999 – Chris and Brian Rance
- 2000 – Jorge Santos
- 2001 – Colin Meurk
- 2002 – Marge Maddren
- 2003 – Gerry McSweeney
- 2004 – Colin Ogle
- 2005 – Ewen Cameron
- 2006 – Bruce Clarkson
- 2007 – Amanda Baird
- 2008 – Shannel Courtney
- 2009 – Philip Simpson
- 2010 – Colin Burrows
- 2011 – Mark Dean
- 2012 – Ralph Allen
- 2013 – Nick Head
- 2014 – Clive Paton
- 2015/16 – Barbara and Neill Simpson
- 2017 – Peter de Lange
- 2018 – Robert McGowan
- 2019 – Chris Horne
- 2020 – Graeme Atkins
- 2021 – Beverley Clarkson
- 2022 – Simon Walls
- 2023 – Mike Harding
- 2024 – John Barkla
- 2025 – Kelvin Lloyd

== Publications ==
- The history of the Loder Cup: a review of the first twenty-five years. Wellington: Loder Cup Committee. 1960.
- The history of the Loder Cup, 1926-1990. Wellington: Dept. of Conservation. 1991. ISBN 047801273X.

== See also ==
- Conservation in New Zealand
- List of environmental awards
