= John H. Baker =

John H. Baker may refer to:

- John Harris Baker (1832–1915), American politician from Indiana
- John Holland Baker (1841–1930), New Zealand surveyor and public servant
- John Baker (legal historian) (John Hamilton Baker, born 1944), English legal historian

== See also ==
- John Baker (disambiguation)
