= Lily Daff =

British born New Zealand artist

- Born: 16 March 1885
- Died: 3 May 1945
- Occupation: Scientific illustrator
- Employers: New Zealand Government Department of Tourist and Health Resorts and Publicity; Tūhura Otago Museum

Lily Attey Daff (born England 26 March 1885, died Dunedin 3 May 1945) was a British-born designer and artist who worked in New Zealand and published watercolour paintings and line drawings of many native New Zealand birds and flowers.

== Early life and education ==
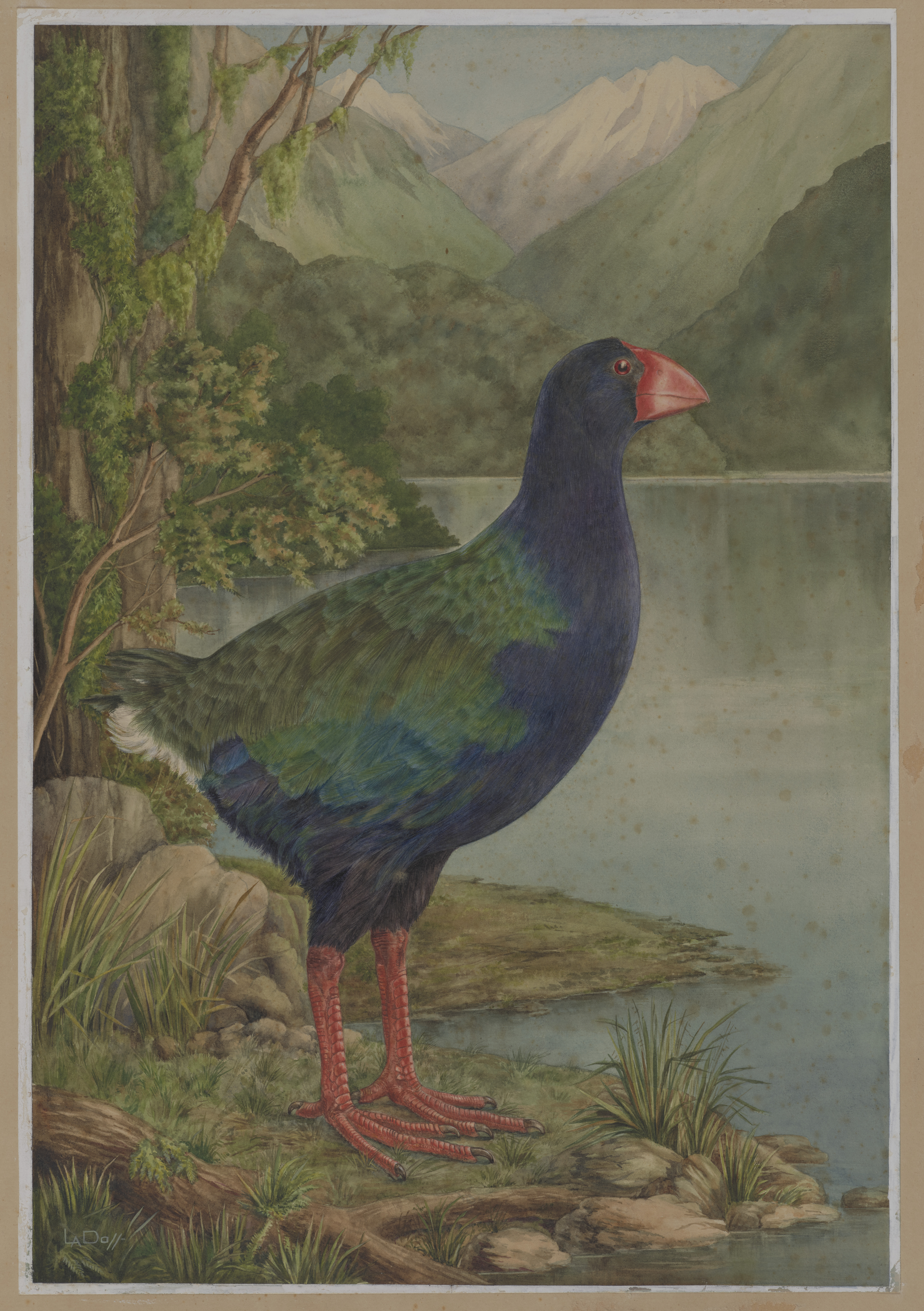
Watercolour illustration of takahē. Artist: Lily A. Daff

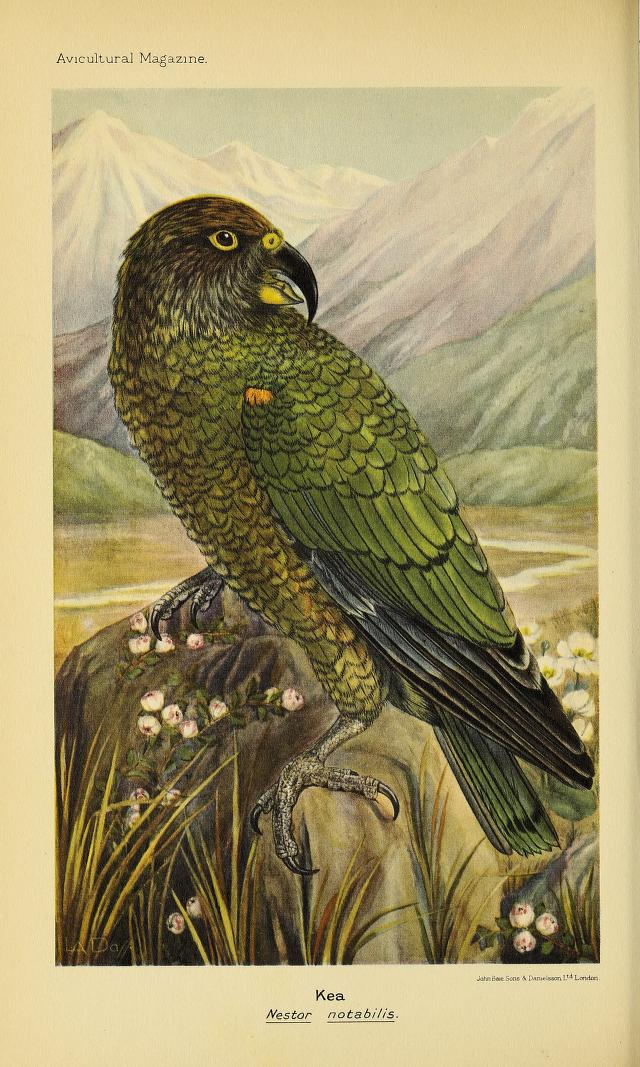
Kea, The Avicultural Magazine, March 1934. Artist: Lily A. Daff

Lily Daff was born in Upton, London, on 16 March 1885. She took courses in drawing and painting at the London Polytechnic but was also known to have completed at least one course at King Edward Technical College in Dunedin.

== Career ==
After her polytechnic training, Daff worked as an illustrator for Christmas card producer Raphael Tuck & Sons. Having left London on the Esperance Bay, Daff arrived in Wellington in 1926 and obtained work with the Government Publicity Department.

In June 1932, Daff, who had served on the staff of the Otago Museum for a year, left Dunedin for Wellington to fulfill a commission for the New Zealand Bird Protection Society to paint a series of pictures of New Zealand native birds.

In 1933 she was offered and accepted a position on the Otago Museum staff, "and began what she later described as the happiest period of her life". She took on the role of Officer in Charge of Exhibitions at Otago Museum, painting dioramas, reorganising and decorating the galleries, designing displays, posters, and producing guide-books. Daff served on staff at the museum for 12 years in total. Her obituary claims her chief contribution to scientific education was in the travelling cases which circulated throughout the museums of New Zealand, however now she is mostly known for her illustrations of New Zealand birds. Daff's line illustrations were considered by the Otago Daily Times to turn the newly published guide Introducing the Otago Museum into a "minor collector's item".

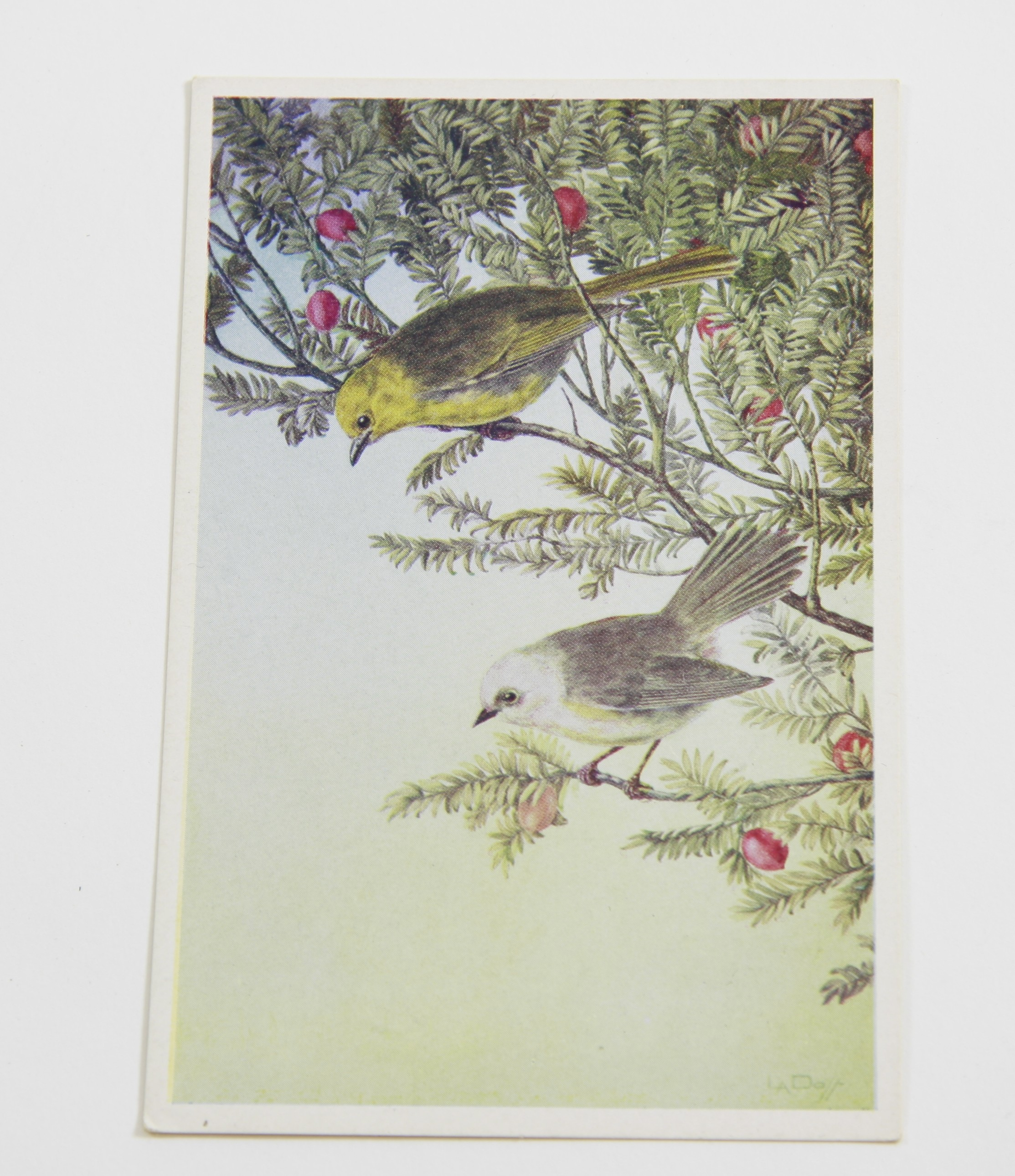
Postcard using picture painted by Lily Daff

Daff illustrated Walter Oliver's book New Zealand Birds and Pérrine Moncrieff's New Zealand Birds and How to Identify Them. Her copies of drawings by J W Barnicoat are in the Hocken Collections, as are a painting of a takahe and other unfinished natural history studies. Daff also supplied hundreds of line drawings to illustrate research publications on ethnography, many of which can be seen online in the Journal of the Polynesian Society.

Daff's paintings completed for the New Zealand Bird Protection Society have been published in books and as journal covers many times, and the original paintings are now in the Alexander Turnbull Library.

Lily Attey Daff died on 3 May 1945. Her middle name, commonly spelled Atty, shows as Attey on her birth certificate.

== Selected publications ==
- Daff, Lily Attey (1933). New Zealand Birds: Twenty-four Coloured Illustrations of Forest-inhabiting Birds with Descriptive Letterpress. Wellington: New Zealand Native Bird Protection Society.
- Daff, Lily Attey; Falla, Robert Alexander (1940). New Zealand Birds: Twenty-four Coloured Illustrations of Birds of Coast and Ocean with Descriptive Letterpress. Wellington: Forest and Bird Protection Society of New Zealand.
- Burton, Olga Pauline; Daff, Lily Attey (1943). Stories of Bird and Bush. Auckland: Oswald-Sealy.
- Daff, Lily Attey (1944). Introducing Some of the More Interesting Exhibits in the Otago Museum. Dunedin: Otago Museum.
- Falla, Robert Alexander; Daff, Lily Attey (1953). New Zealand Sea and Shore Birds. Wellington: Royal Forest and Bird Protection Society of New Zealand.
- Daff, Lily Attey; Ellis, Brian Ashlyn (1974). An Album of New Zealand Birds. Wellington: Reed; Royal Forest and Bird Protection Society of New Zealand. ISBN 9780589008369.
- Easther, Elisabeth, ed. (2017). Bird Words: New Zealand Writers on Birds. Illustrated by Lily Attey Daff. Auckland: Penguin Random House New Zealand.
