= Pérrine Moncrieff =

New Zealand ornithologist, conservationist, writer (1893–1979)

Pérrine Moncrieff CBE
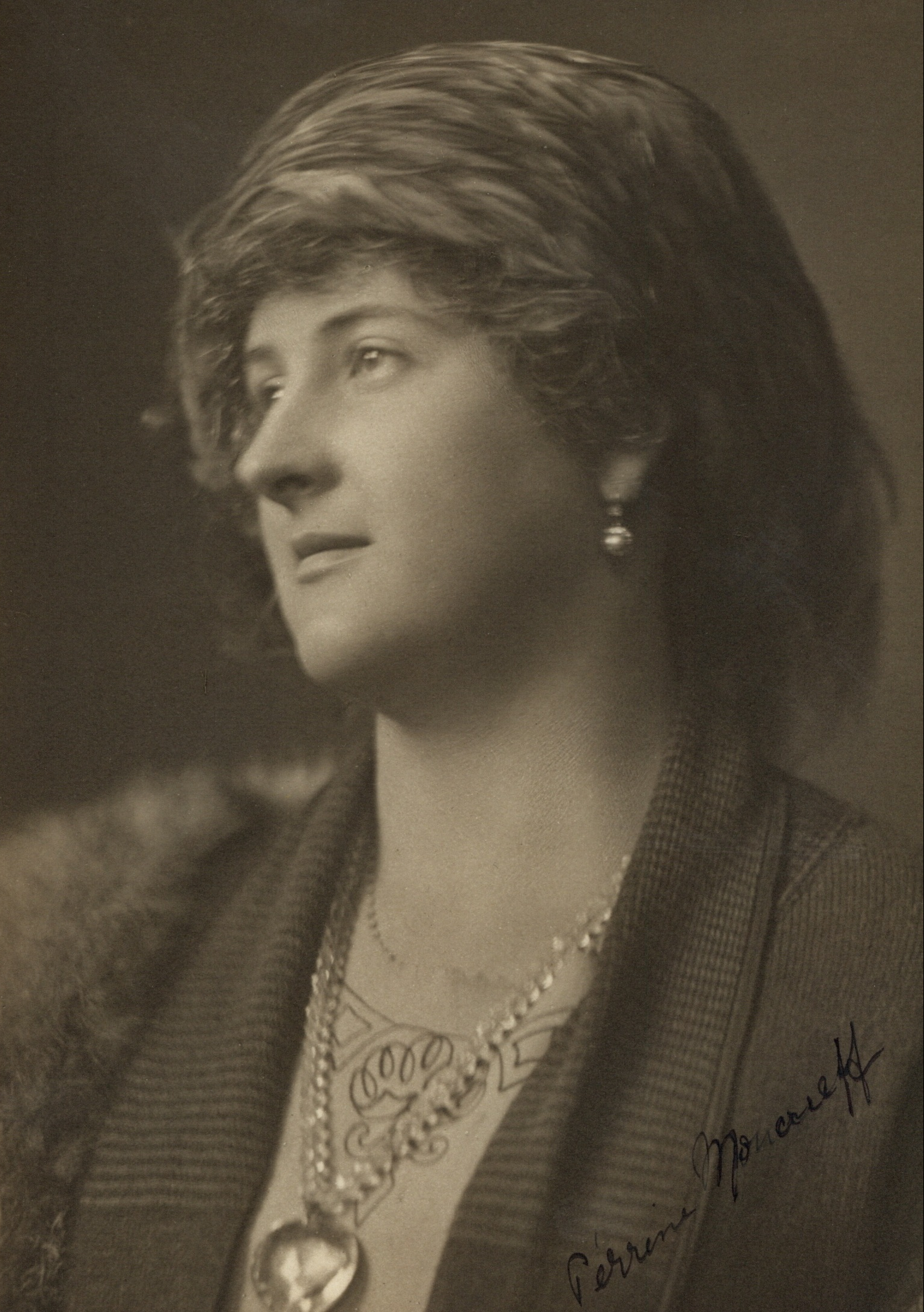
- Moncrieff in 1937
- Born: Pérrine Millais; 8 February 1893; London, England
- Died: 16 December 1979 (aged 86); Wakapuaka, New Zealand
- Occupations: Ornithologist; conservationist; writer
- Spouse: Malcolm Moncrieff (m. 1914; died 1968)
- Children: 2
- Relatives: John Everett Millais (grandfather)
- Awards: Loder Cup (1953)

Pérrine Moncrieff CBE (née Millais; 8 February 1893 – 16 December 1979) was a New Zealand writer, conservationist and amateur ornithologist.

== Biography ==
She was born in London, England in 1893 as Pérrine Millais. She was the granddaughter of the painter Sir John Millais, one of the founders of the Pre-Raphaelite Brotherhood. She spent her early life living in London, Brussels and in Perthshire in Scotland. She married Captain Malcolm Moncrieff, a veteran of the Boer War, in 1914. They moved from Britain to New Zealand after the end of the First World War where they settled at Nelson, having originally planned to move to Canada. She was the first female President of the Royal Australasian Ornithologists Union (RAOU), 1932–1933. She first joined the organisation in 1923 and two years later published New Zealand birds and how to identify them. The book was a success, with six editions published from 1925 through to 1961.

She is credited with being almost single-handedly responsible for setting aside land that would eventually be the Abel Tasman National Park. Moncrieff was awarded the Loder Cup in 1953. In the 1975 Queen's Birthday Honours, she was appointed a Commander of the Order of the British Empire, for services to conservation as a naturalist and to the Abel Tasman National Park. The government of the Netherlands awarded her the Order of Orange-Nassau in 1974, in recognition of her efforts to protect Abel Tasman National Park, an area of significant importance in the history of Dutch exploration.

In 2017, Moncrieff was selected as one of the Royal Society Te Apārangi's "150 women in 150 words", celebrating the contributions of women to knowledge in New Zealand.

== How did she create a national park during the World War II? ==
Firstly, according to Philip Simpson in Down the Bay, she knew how to express her opinions without reservation. She learned from her aristocratic aunts how to gather leading members of society around her and communicate the idea to the media. Her widespread appreciation of nature and the scientific basis to her observations that birds and nature are important to human survival, resonated with New Zealand and Māori attitudes.

After a fire at Torrent Bay, she lobbied hard. When it was argued that the war effort took priority and a park would "take" agricultural land, she countered that the park would create a haven for war-warried return soldiers who could act as rangers. She also pointed out that the park would commemorate both the Nelson and Tasman centennial celebrations. Her masterstroke was naming it after Dutch explorer Abel Tasman and asking the New Zealand government to request the Queen Wilhelmina of the Netherlands become its patron.

== Publications ==
Books she authored include:

- Moncrieff, P. (1925). New Zealand Birds and How to Identify Them. Whitcombe & Tombs: Auckland. (Field-guide. 5 editions published to 1961) Colour plates by Lily A. Daff.
- Moncrieff, P. (1965). People Came Later. Author: Nelson.
- Moncrieff, P. (1976). The Rise and Fall of David Riccio. Ambassador: Wellington.
