= Lawrie Metcalf =

New Zealand botanist (1928–2017)

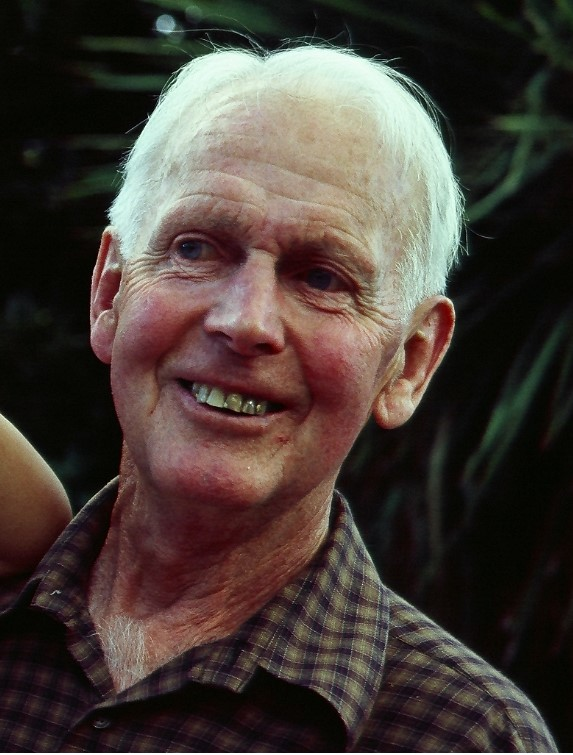
- Lawrie Metcalf
- Born: 18 August 1928
- Died: 18 August 2017 (aged 89)
- Citizenship: New Zealand
- Occupations: Horticulturalist and botanist
- Relatives: Daughter: Victoria Metcalf
- Writing career
- Genres: Gardening and plant guides
- Subjects: Native and introduced plants in New Zealand. Hebes
- Notable works: The Cultivation of New Zealand Trees and Shrubs Hebes: A Guide to Species, Hybrids and Allied Genera
- Notable awards: Companion of the Queen's Service Order

Lawrence James Metcalf (1928–2017) was a New Zealand horticulturalist, botanist, conservationist and author of gardening and plant identification books. Metcalf popularized and advocated for the planting of native or indigenous plant species in both public and private gardens and pioneered their propagation techniques (horticulture). In 1991 the British Royal Horticultural Society recognized his work on the cultivation of New Zealand's native plants, with the Gold Veitch Memorial Medal.

== Professional work ==
Metcalf was a global authority on the Hebe genus, indigenous to New Zealand, and planted widely around the world in public gardens with temperate climates

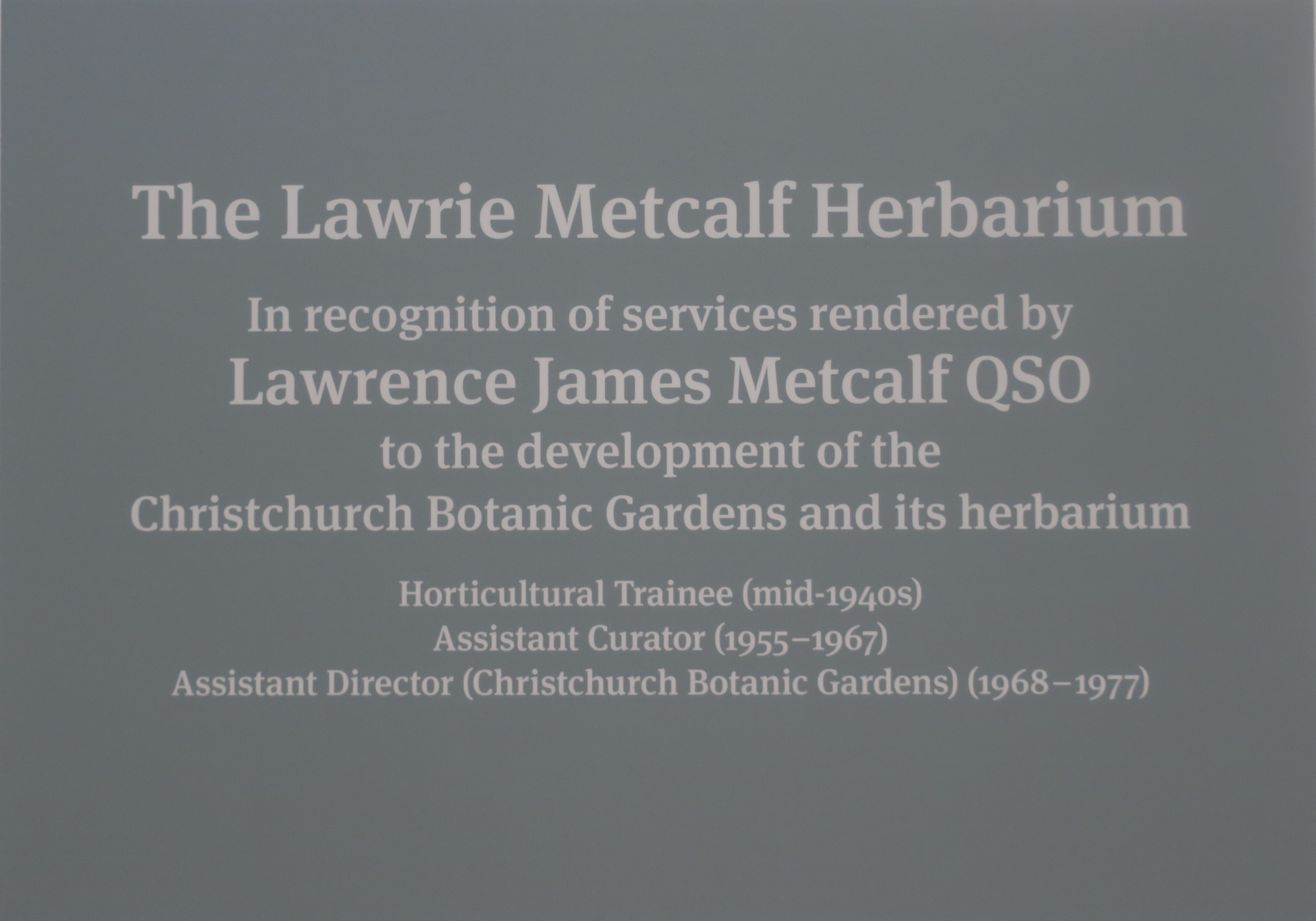
The Lawrie Metcalf Herbarium in Christchurch Botanic Garden

As the Assistant Curator (later Assistant Director) of Christchurch Botanic Gardens, Metcalf founded and expanded its International Seed Exchange programme.

After more than 20 years at Christchurch Botanic Gardens, Metcalf became the Director of Parks and Recreation at the Invercargill City Council until his retirement in 1992. During his retirement Metcalf wrote many popular books on identifying New Zealand plants, and on native plant propagation and gardening.

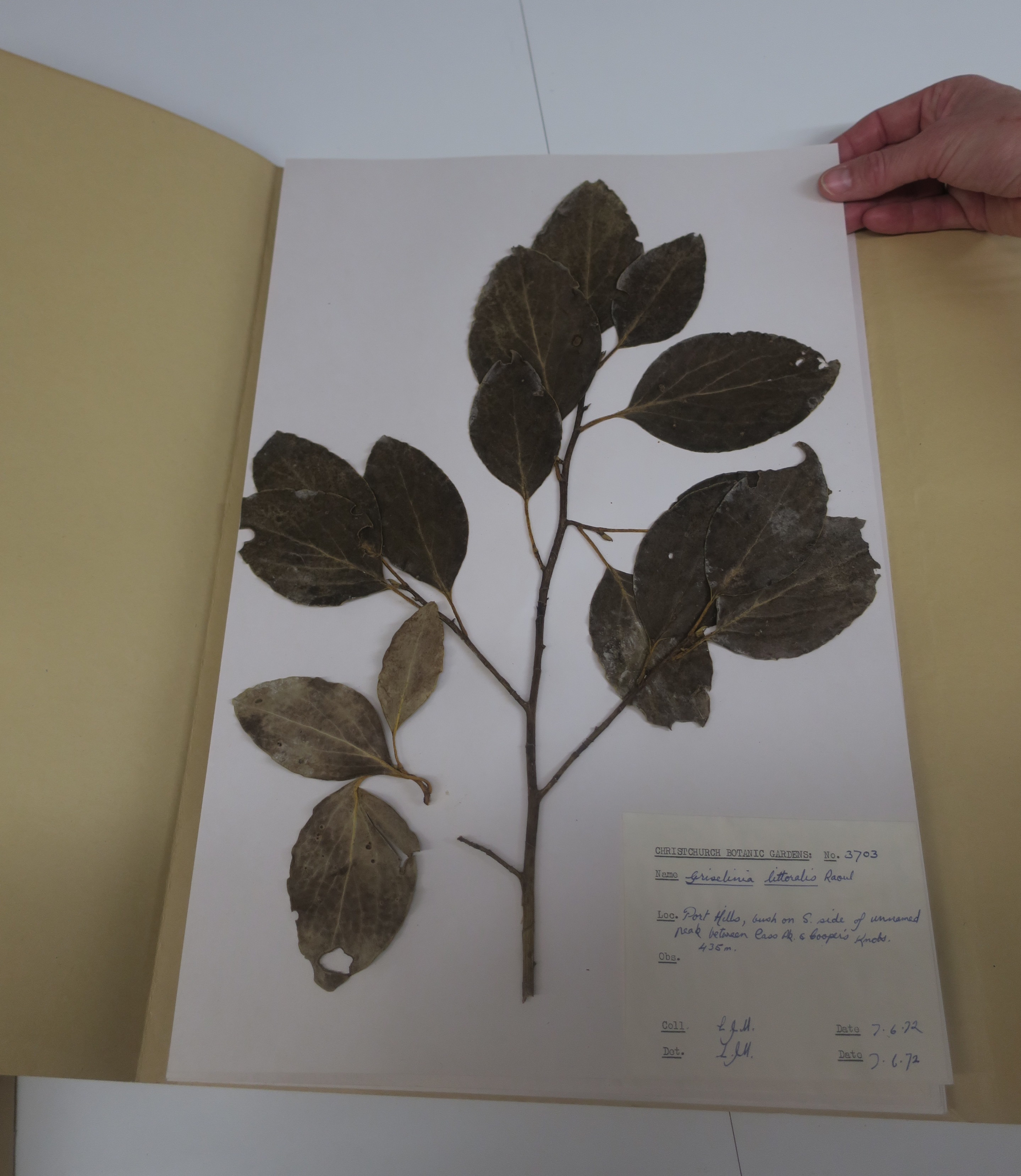
Pressed Griselinia littoralis specimen collected by Lawrie Metcalf in Christchurch Botanic Garden Herbarium

In 2017, the Herbarium at Christchurch Botanic Gardens was named in his honour. It contains many dried plant specimens collected by Metcalf during his time as Assistant Curator and Assistant Director.

== Awards ==
- 1975: Fellow of the New Zealand Institute of Park and Recreation Administration.
- 1978: The Loder Cup, presented to “encourage and honour New Zealanders who work to investigate, promote, retain and cherish our indigenous flora”.
- 1988: Associate on Honour (AHRIH) of the RNZIH.
- 1988: Ian Galloway Outstanding Achievement Award, which “Recognizes outstanding contribution in the Parks, Amenity Horticulture and Open space”.
- 1991: Gold Veitch Memorial Medal, the highest honour from the Royal Horticultural Society to people outside the United Kingdom.
- 1999: Honorary Fellow of the New Zealand Institute of Landscape Architects,
- 2010: Appointed a Companion of the Queen’s Service Order (QSO)
- 2017: The Christchurch Botanic Gardens Herbarium was officially renamed the “Lawrie Metcalf Herbarium”.

== Bibliography ==
- Barnett, M. J., Gilpin, H. G. and Metcalf, L. J. Editors (1963) A Garden Century: the Christchurch Botanic Gardens, 1863–1963. Christchurch: Christchurch City Council.
- Metcalf, L. J. (1972) The Cultivation of New Zealand Trees and Shrubs. Wellington, New Zealand: A. H. & A. W. Reed.
- Metcalf, Lawrie (1993) The Cultivation of New Zealand Plants. Auckland, New Zealand: Godwit Press.
- Metcalf, Lawrie (1995) The Propagation of New Zealand Native Plants. Auckland, New Zealand: Godwit Press.
- Metcalf, Lawrie (1998) The Cultivation of New Zealand Native Grasses. Auckland, New Zealand: Godwit Press.
- Metcalf, Lawrie (2002) A Photographic Guide to Trees of New Zealand. Auckland, New Zealand: New Holland Publishers.
- Metcalf, Lawrie (2003) A Photographic Guide to Ferns of New Zealand. Auckland, New Zealand: New Holland Publishers.
- Metcalf, Lawrie (2006) Hebes: a guide to species, hybrids and allied genera. Portland, Oregon, USA: Timber Press.
- Metcalf, Lawrie (2006) Know Your New Zealand Trees. Auckland, New Zealand: New Holland Publishers.
- Metcalf, Lawrie (2006) A Photographic Guide to Alpine Plants of New Zealand. Auckland, New Zealand: New Holland Publishers.
- Metcalf, Lawrie (2007) The Propagation of New Zealand Native Plants (revised). New Zealand: Random House.
- Metcalf, Lawrie (2008) The Cultivation of New Zealand Native Grasses (revised). Auckland, New Zealand: Godwit Press.
- Metcalf, Lawrie (2009) Know Your New Zealand Native Plants. Auckland, New Zealand: New Holland Publishers.
- Metcalf, L. J. (2011) The Cultivation of New Zealand Trees and Shrubs (revised and updated edition). Wellington, Auckland, New Zealand: Raupo, Penguin Group.
- Metcalf, Lawrie and Edwards, Roy. (2014) New Zealand Native Ground Cover Plants: a practical guide for gardeners and landscapers. Christchurch: Canterbury University Press.
