= Beverley Clarkson =

New Zealand botanist, ecologist and wetland conservationist

- Alma mater: University of Waikato; University of Canterbury Faculty of Education
- Occupation: Botanist; plant ecologist; ecologist
- Spouse(s): Bruce Clarkson
- Awards: Loder Cup (2022)
- Academic career
- Fields: Plant ecology, swamp ecosystem
- Institutions: Manaaki Whenua – Landcare Research (1994–)
- Doctoral advisor: Warwick B Silvester, Chrissen E.C. Gemmill
- Author abbrev. (botany): B.R.Clarkson

Beverley Rae Clarkson is a New Zealand botanist, ecologist and wetland researcher and conservationist. She is best known for her research into and her conservation work with New Zealand wetlands. In 2021, the city of Hamilton awarded her the Hamilton-Kirikiroa Medal. In the same year Clarkson was awarded the New Zealand conservation award, the Loder Cup.

== Early life and education ==
Clarkson's interest in botany was sparked and supported by her parents with both her mother and father teaching her about botany, taking her on trips into the bush to study and collect plants. She obtained a Bachelor of Science in 1974 from the University of Waikato. She then attended the Christchurch College of Education, earning a Diploma in Education in 1977. She subsequently returned to the University of Waikato, obtaining a Masters of Science in 1980 and a PhD in 2005. Her doctoral thesis was titled Restiad bog development and nutrient dynamics of the dominant species.

== Botany and conservation work ==
Clarkson works for Manaaki Whenua – Landcare Research as a senior researcher in plant ecology. While working with Manaaki Whenua she established the New Zealand National Wetland Database which facilitates research into New Zealand wetlands. Clarkson is also an honorary lecturer at the University of Waikato.

Clarkson is a member and has served on the committee of the New Zealand Botanical Society. She is also a member of the Waikato Conservation Board, the International Mire Conservation Group and the International Society of Wetland Scientists. She is a member and a founding trustee of the National Wetland Trust.

== Conservation activism ==
Clarkson is a nationally renowned and vocal advocate for the conservation of New Zealand's wetlands. With the National Wetland Trust, she educates and raises public awareness about New Zealand wetlands through field days, restoration projects, meetings and conferences, as well as providing policy advice to both local and central government. She counts as one of her main achievements the inclusion of her research on wetlands into the 2020 document outlining the Labour Government's Essential Freshwater Reforms.

== Botanical writing ==
She is a researcher and writer of scientific journal articles and has compiled the handbook on the restoration of New Zealand wetlands. She also edited the New Zealand Botanical Society newsletter. She collects botanical specimens, some of which are held at Te Papa.

== Awards ==
In 2020, Clarkson received the Kudos Lifetime Achievement Award. In 2021 Clarkson was awarded the Hamilton-Kirikiroa Medal by the city of Hamilton. This award recognised her work as an internationally renowned scientist, ecologist and conservationist. Also in 2021, Clarkson was awarded the Loder Cup, a national conservation award. This award was presented to Clarkson in April 2022.

== Family ==
Clarkson is married to botanist and academic Bruce D. Clarkson.

== Selected works ==
- Wetland restoration : a handbook for New Zealand freshwater systems. Monica Peters & Beverley R. Clarkson. Lincoln, N.Z.: Manaaki Whenua Press. 2010. ISBN 978-0-478-34706-7. OCLC 587398966.
- J. Whinam; G.S. Hope; Beverley Clarkson; R.P. Buxton; P.A. Alspach; P. Adam (2003). "Sphagnum in peatlands of Australasia: Their distribution, utilisation and management". Wetlands Ecology and Management. 11 (1/2): 37–49. doi:10.1023/A:1022005504855. ISSN 0923-4861. Wikidata Q60562453.
- Beverley Clarkson; Brian Sorrell (2018), Monitoring Wetland Condition in New Zealand, pp. 511–520, doi:10.1016/B978-0-12-805091-0.00054-2, Wikidata Q60562426
- Beverley R. Clarkson; Louis A. Schipper; Bruce D. Clarkson (June 2004). "Vegetation and peat characteristics of restiad bogs on Chatham Island (Rekohu), New Zealand". New Zealand Journal of Botany. 42 (2): 293–312. doi:10.1080/0028825X.2004.9512905. ISSN 0028-825X. Wikidata Q60562445.
- S.C. Myers; B.R. Clarkson; P.N. Reeves; B.D. Clarkson (July 2013). "Wetland management in New Zealand: Are current approaches and policies sustaining wetland ecosystems in agricultural landscapes?". Ecological Engineering. 56: 107–120. doi:10.1016/J.ECOLENG.2012.12.097. ISSN 0925-8574. Wikidata Q60562436.
- Beverley R. Clarkson; Lawrence R. Walker; Bruce D. Clarkson; Warwick B. Silvester (December 2002). "Effect of Coriaria arborea on seed banks during primary succession on Mt Tarawera, New Zealand". New Zealand Journal of Botany. 40 (4): 629–638. doi:10.1080/0028825X.2002.9512819. ISSN 0028-825X. Wikidata Q60562455.
