= Teal Deal =

Alliance between two political parties of New Zealand

The Teal Deal is a hypothetical blue–green political alliance between the Green Party of Aotearoa New Zealand and the New Zealand National Party. The term Teal Deal is a reference to the medium blue-green colour teal, which combines the political colours that represent the two parties.

The Green Party use the colour green to represent their party in reference to the environment
Teal is a mix of blue and green
Blue, the traditional colour of conservatism in New Zealand, which is used by the National Party

== Background ==
Ideas of an arrangement between the Greens and National Party have been floated without success, notably in 2006 when MP Nándor Tánczos stood for the Greens co-leadership, claiming the Greens (then supporting the Fifth Labour Government) needed flexibility to work with both the political left and right in order to better advocate environmental issues. However the idea was rebuked by party members and Tánczos lost the co-leadership race to Russel Norman.

Following the demise of the Labour-led government at the 2008 general election the Greens briefly flirted with the Fifth National Government in 2009 by signing a Memorandum of understanding (MOU) with National to jointly work together on shared policy initiatives including a home insulation scheme and updating New Zealand's energy efficiency strategy. The MOU between the Greens and National lapsed in 2011 and was not renewed following the 2011 general election.

== 2017 general election ==
During the government formation negotiations following the 2017 New Zealand general election, there was much public and media speculation a so-called "teal deal" between National and the Greens. (Note: The specific term "teal deal" emerged during this discussion. The earliest use seems to be a Sept 28 2017 blog by Caleb Morgan.) National had won a plurality of seats but could not form a parliamentary majority without support from either the Greens or New Zealand First.

Former National Prime Minister Jim Bolger weighed in on the issue saying that the Greens had a responsibility to "pick up the phone to National". National leader Bill English and Greens Co-Leader James Shaw both maintained if the other rang, they had a responsibility to listen, but the obligation did not go further than that. Shaw later said most of the talk of a "teal deal" was fed through proxies, saying, "It's all just PR and fluff, there's no substance to it".

On 4 October, Green Party campaign committee member Andrew Campbell (also a member of the Greens negotiation team) had a meeting with English leading to initial reactions that the two parties were negotiating. It was soon revealed that Campbell was meeting English formally in his role as senior media relations advisor for New Zealand Rugby. Ultimately, the Greens did not do a deal with National and on 19 October 2017 the Greens announced they would support through confidence and supply a coalition government between Labour and New Zealand First. The Greens entered government for the first time, gaining three ministers outside cabinet (Shaw, Julie Anne Genter and Eugenie Sage) and an Undersecretary (Jan Logie).

== Later developments ==
A grassroots petition for a National–Green coalition (not authorised by either party) initiated by Christchurch-based organic fashion entrepreneur Clive Antony (a National supporter) acquired more than 3,700 signatures.

In February 2018 National leader Bill English encouraged the Greens to work with National on areas of common interest, which would allow the Greens to achieve policy gains without needing the support from the Labour–NZ First coalition government. This caused speculation that National was attempting to build a better relationship with the Greens by the 2020 election. When Simon Bridges replaced English as National's leader he stated his preferred coalition partner leading up to the next election would be the Greens. However, both Green co-leadership candidates at that time (Julie Anne Genter and Marama Davidson) were skeptical that the suggestion would work out.

In March 2018 Shaw announced that the Greens would cede much of their primary question time in parliament to National so the Government can be held to greater account and not be asked 'patsy questions'. Bridges welcomed the Green Party's decision saying it will equip him better to be an effective opposition.

At the Greens 2019 annual general meeting Shaw announced that the Greens had ruled out forming a coalition with National whilst Simon Bridges was their party leader.

Erica Stanford believes that the Green Party could work with National, saying that if the Greens "could just relax a little bit... they could do so much good." Stanford says that her blood "runs blue and it always will", but acknowledges a touch of green, saying "maybe it's a tealy blue".

=== Blue–green party ===
Another speculated outcome is the formation of a new political party. In the mid-1990s New Zealand had a blue–green party, the Progressive Green Party, which sought to combine environmentalist policies with right-wing politics, and another economically centrist environmental party, Green Society. Both parties were made up largely of former Green Party activists unhappy about the Greens' left-wing position and their decision to join the left-wing Alliance. The parties both polled poorly in the 1996 general election, achieving 0.26% and 0.11% of party votes respectively and no electorates. The Progressive Greens disbanded soon after, with most members joining the "Bluegreens" faction of the National Party, and Green Society also disbanded without contesting any other elections.

Following the 2017 election, there was talk of a new centrist green political party being formed. Commentators have cited National's lack of potential support partners as the biggest impediment they face in forming a government in the future and a newly created party being a potential solution. Speculation heightened during the 2018 Northcote by-election when former Green Party leadership candidate Vernon Tava sought (unsuccessfully) the National nomination. Tava was subsequently touted as the front-runner to lead any new party. In January 2019 he told media that a party truly having the environment at its heart was absent from the political scene. He reaffirmed his enthusiasm for the notion of a new environmentalist party and said he would consider leading such a party.

Tava launched the Sustainable New Zealand Party on 10 November 2019. National's then-deputy leader Paula Bennett said she thought the party had a chance of attracting Green voters who were upset of focusing on cannabis instead of more environmental policies. Shaw said he wished Tava luck with the party. Sustainable New Zealand won only 1,880 party votes, 0.07% of the total, at the 2020 general election and had no candidates elected. The party was subsequently dissolved on 15 December 2021.

== See also ==
- Teal independents, an Australian group of centrist green candidates in the 2022 Australian federal election
- Jamaica coalition (politics)
