= Noeline Baker =

New Zealand suffragist (1878–1958)

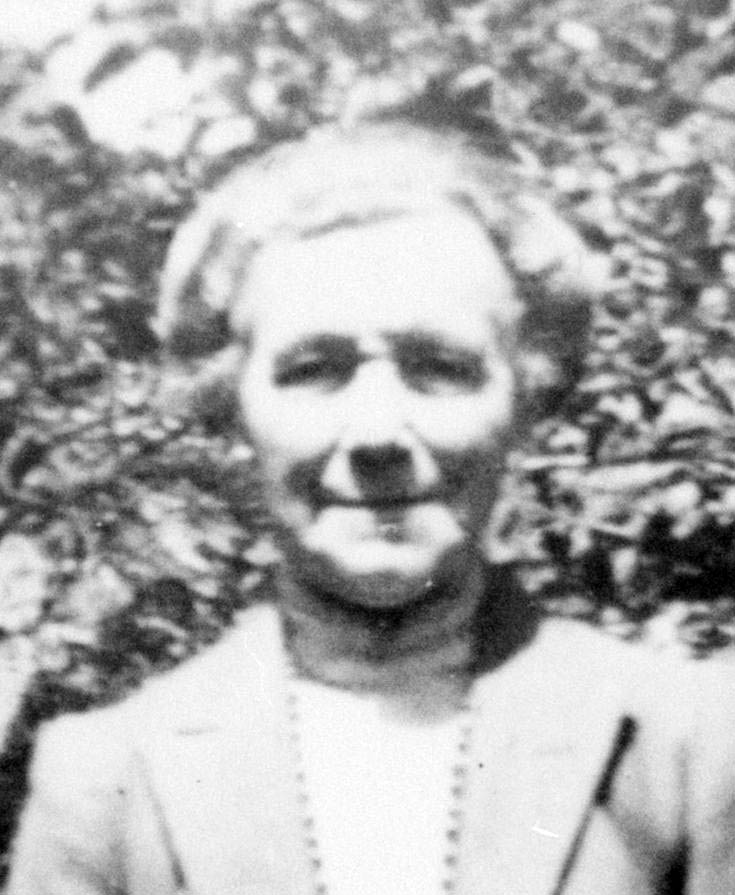
- Noeline Baker in c. 1953
- Born: Isabel Noeline Baker; 25 December 1878; Christchurch, New Zealand
- Died: 25 August 1958 (aged 79); Stewart Island, New Zealand
- Education: Fitzherbert Terrace School
- Occupations: Social Activist, Suffragist, Botanist

Isabel Noeline Baker MBE (25 December 1878 – 25 August 1958) was a New Zealand suffragist, wartime women's labour administrator, gardener, and peace educator.

== Biography ==
She was born in the Christchurch suburb of Opawa, New Zealand on 25 December 1878 to Isabel Baker (née Strachey) and John Holland Baker, chief surveyor of Canterbury. Isabel (1845–1920) was a daughter of Richard Strachey of Ashwick Grove, Somerset, the third son of Sir Henry Strachey, 1st Baronet. Isabel's mother, Anne Marie (or Anna Maria), was a daughter of Alexander Powell MP, a Tory member of parliament for Downton, Wiltshire.

She attended Samuel Marsden Collegiate School in Wellington, then known as Fitzherbert Terrace School. Her parents returned to England living in Guildford, Surrey, where Baker was active in the National Union of Women's Suffrage Societies and a founding member of the local branch. She was also a member of the London Society for Women's Suffrage. For her organising of women's labour during World War I, she was appointed Member of the Most Excellent Order of the British Empire (MBE) in 1920.

She returned to New Zealand and built a house at Halfmoon Bay on Stewart Island called Moturau Moana, and used a checklist by botanist Leonard Cockayne to populate it with all the local indigenous plants. Today Moturau Moana is New Zealand's southernmost public garden after she donated it to the government. For her botanical work at Moturau Moana, Baker was awarded the Loder Cup in 1949. Other items of hers are held by Te Papa, the national museum in Wellington.

She edited her father's account of his time in New Zealand and performed music throughout her life.

Baker died on 25 August 1958 on Stewart Island.

For her work in England during World War I, she was posthumously inducted into the Hall of Fame of Samuel Marsden Collegiate School in 2015.
