= Halfmoon Bay (Stewart Island) =

Bay in New Zealand

Coordinates: 46°54′S 168°08′E

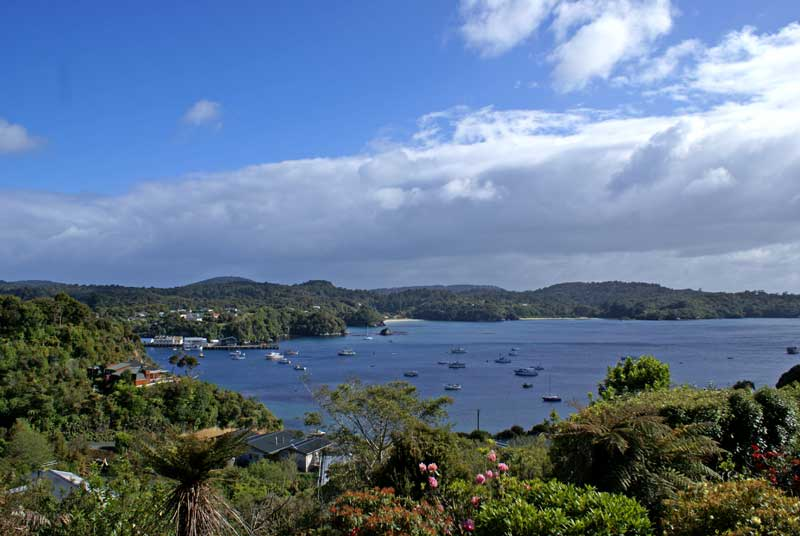
Overlooking Oban and Halfmoon Bay from south

Halfmoon Bay from north (Bragg trig)

Halfmoon Bay lies on the eastern coast of Stewart Island in New Zealand.

The town of Oban lies in the bay, with the foreshore of the town centre being Thomson Bay, the innermost bay of the wider Halfmoon Bay. A small fishing fleet and a ferry service from Bluff use the bay, with a wharf situated at the northern end of the town centre in Thomson Bay.

Halfmoon Bay contains many smaller bays and coves within it - from north to south, Sarah Cove, Bragg Bay, Thomson Bay (fronting the town centre), Little Bay, Leask Bay, Jensen Bay, and Harrold Bay.

The gardens of Moturau Moana built by Isabel Noeline Baker, are New Zealand's southernmost public gardens.

Halfmoon Bay and its neighbour Horseshoe Bay are the subject of a name mix-up. Halfmoon Bay is in fact shaped more like a horseshoe, whereas Horseshoe Bay is shaped like a half moon.
