= Dancing Star Foundation =

U.S.-based non-profit organization

- Formation: 1993; 33 years ago
- Type: Nonprofit
- Headquarters: California
- Key people: Michael Tobias, President and CEO, Jane Morrison, Executive VP
- Website: www.dancingstarfoundation.org

The Dancing Star Foundation is a U.S.-based non-profit organization engaged in environmental, cultural and animal welfare activities, including environmental education, global biodiversity conservation, and animal rights. It was founded in 1993.

== Areas of focus ==
=== Education ===
Via print and film, Dancing Star Foundation seeks to increase awareness of environmental issues ranging from biodiversity and extinction to non-violence and over-population. Examples are No Vacancy, a book and documentary film combination which addresses the volatile issue of population stabilization in the U.S., China, and eight other countries; the book Sanctuary, "a 338-page compendium of full color photography showcasing twenty-four animal sanctuaries located throughout twenty different countries"; and the documentary film Mad Cowboy, the story of cattle rancher-turned-vegan and animal rights activist Howard Lyman.

=== Animal protection ===
The foundation operates an animal sanctuary in Central California for rescued animals. The mission of the facilities is to provide sanctuary "for the benefit, solace, peace and quiet of the resident species".

=== Biodiversity conservation ===
The foundation is involved in efforts to promote biodiversity conservation—mostly through "documentation in book and film form of research being carried out by governments, other NGOs and individual ecologists"—in various countries.

=== UCLA medical school ===
Dancing Star Foundation created and funded an alternative oncology program, the Sue Stiles Program in Integrative Oncology at the Jonsson Comprehensive Cancer Center in 2001. The program is under the direction of oncologist Richard J. Pietras.

== Euthanasia controversy ==
In early 2009, a small number of former employees alleged that the Cayucos animal sanctuary was euthanizing animals for economic reasons. A maintenance supervisor who made similar allegations claims he was dismissed due to speaking out, although the sanctuary says he was terminated for other reasons. Dancing Star denied the animal-care allegations, saying that they are "contrary to our most deeply held beliefs" and that the Foundation is "unwavering in our commitment to compassion". San Luis Obispo County Animal Services determined that the euthanized animals were "either beyond treatment or had conditions for which euthanasia would be at least one of the considerations that could be responsibly made". The general counsel of the Farm Sanctuary in New York State, who examined the Cayucos sanctuary following the allegations, said he was unable to confirm the process for selecting those who had been euthanized. But he noted, "It's the best-funded place in the country for animals, and the staff appears to be caring."
