= Guy Salmon =

New Zealand environmentalist (born 1949)

Guy Salmon ONZM
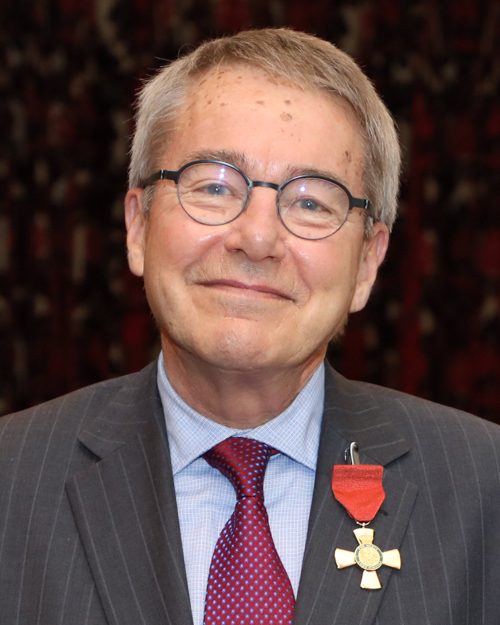
- Salmon in 2021
- Born: Guy Winston Salmon; 1949 (age 76–77)
- Occupation: Environmentalist
- Political party: Values Party; Progressive Greens; National Party
- Spouse: Gwenny Davis (m. 1985)
- Relatives: John Salmon (father)

Guy Winston Salmon ONZM (born 1949) is a New Zealand environmentalist.

== Early life and family ==
Salmon was born in 1949. His father was John Salmon, who was a noted entomologist and professor of zoology at Victoria University of Wellington. His mother was Pamela Naomi Salmon (née Wilton). On 9 February 1985, Salmon married conservation activist Gwenny Davis at Tōtaranui.

== Career ==
Salmon is executive director of the Ecologic Foundation, an independent policy think tank. He has been involved with this organisation in its various forms since the 1970s. In the early 1970s, Salmon was a prominent member of the environmentalist Values Party.

In 1990 and 1991, Salmon was a member of Simon Upton's review group that finalised the definition of sustainable management included in the Resource Management Act 1991.

Salmon stood as a candidate for Parliament on behalf of the Progressive Greens in 1996 and the New Zealand National Party in the 2002 election.

== Honours and awards ==
In 1990, Salmon was awarded the New Zealand 1990 Commemoration Medal. In the 2021 New Year Honours, Salmon was appointed an Officer of the New Zealand Order of Merit, for services to the environment.
