= Native Forests Action Council =

Environmental organisation in New Zealand (1975–1988)

Native Forests Action Council was an environmental organisation in New Zealand.

It was formed in 1975 from what was the Beech Forest Action Committee to advocate for the protection of native forests. In the mid-1980s, the group advocated for the core of North-west Nelson Forest Park to be protected as a national park due to extensive mining proposals threatening the area. This ultimately led to Kahurangi National Park to be formed in 1996.

For some time, Guy Salmon was the group's director. The group changed its name to the Maruia Society in 1988. The Maruia Society then became the Ecologic Foundation, with Salmon as its director.
