= Val Sanderson =

New Zealand businessman and conservationist

Ernest Valentine "Val" Sanderson (8 February 1866 – 29 December 1945) was a New Zealand businessman and conservationist. He was born in Dunedin, New Zealand in 1866. Sanderson is known for founding the Native Bird Protection Society in 1923. In 1935 the society became the Forest and Bird Protection Society of New Zealand.

Val Sanderson is acknowledged as the founder of Forest and Bird. In 1921, after his return from the First World War, the then Captain Val Sanderson was angered that the Kapiti Island wildlife reserve was unfenced and extensively damaged by cattle, sheep and goats. Sanderson campaigned for better management of Kapiti Island and succeeded in having it re-dedicated as a Wildlife Reserve. After this success, Sanderson held a public meeting in March 1923 which established the Native Bird Protection Society with Sir Thomas Mackenzie as the Society's first President. The New Zealand Forestry League, a forest conservation group already existed but it gradually died out. In 1935 Mackenzie and Sanderson renamed the society the Forest and Bird Protection Society of New Zealand. Sanderson drove an expansion of the society's range of interests into such areas as soil erosion and use of native trees for soil stabilisation. He became the president in 1933 a position which he held until his death in 1945 aged 79.
