= Ecologic Foundation =

Environmental organisation in New Zealand

The Ecologic Foundation is an environmental organisation in New Zealand.

The Society had its origins in the Beech Forest Action Committee and the Native Forest Action Council (NFAC). In 1989 the NFAC changed its name to the Maruia Society: "Maruia" means "sheltered valley" in the Māori language, and there is also a valley of that name in New Zealand's South Island. In 1999, the society adopted an altered mission and took the name Ecologic Foundation.

Throughout most of its history, the executive director was Guy Salmon who has been present through all the group's incarnations.

The Maruia Society lost a lot of members during the mid-late 1990s when it came out in support of sustainable milling of beech on the West Coast—in contrast to the mainstream environmental movement in New Zealand, which was advocating against active management of the forests with money being channelled back into the forests for pest control.
