= John Holland Baker =

New Zealand surveyor and public servant (1841–1930)

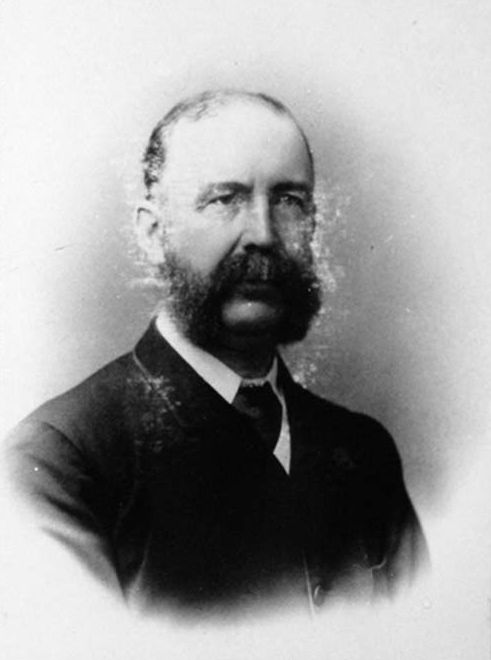
John Holland Baker in 1877

John Holland Baker (4 December 1841 – 5 February 1930) was a New Zealand surveyor and public servant.

He was born in Chilcomb, Hampshire, England on 4 December 1841. A son of the Rev. Thomas Feilding Baker, Rector of Cressingham Parish, Norfolk, and Catherine Mathias, he was educated at Yarmouth Grammar School, and in Germany, where he lived with his parents in Königswinter. He left school at 15 after he punched a master. He was sent to New Zealand when his uncle, Octavius Mathias, offered to take one of the Baker sons. He arrived in Lyttelton on the Maori during 1857. In the following year, he started an apprenticeship as a surveyor, with another uncle, John Baker, paying the £200 for the three-year education. He bought land in December 1858, and a house during 1860. On one of his trips to the back-country, he found 15,000 acres (6,100 ha) of unclaimed land suitable for sheep farming. He was granted a lease in 1860, which he could sell for £300. He became a land speculator but, unlike others, he never got rich from it. Baker explored the Southern Alps with Samuel Butler for further sheep country; they found what was later known as Whitcombe Pass but no suitable land. In 1861, Baker was the first European to cross the Haast Pass. He was one of the inaugural vice-chairmen of the New Zealand Alpine Club, which was founded in July 1891 in Christchurch.

The Otago gold rush attracted Baker south, and he spent six months prospecting at the Tuapeka River. This was unsuccessful, and he went to Invercargill in May 1862. There, Theophilus Heale engaged him as a sub-assistant surveyor. In 1863 he was appointed assistant surveyor to carry out the Southland triangulation. In 1864 he was promoted to the post of Deputy Chief Surveyor, and later on in the same year when Heale resigned he became Chief Surveyor, and a member of the Southland Waste Lands Board. Baker then became Inspector of Surveys for Southland, and in the following year he assisted James McKerrow in connecting Stewart Island with the geodesical survey of Otago. While in Southland, Baker arranged the exhibits for the Otago and Melbourne exhibitions.

On 10 December 1875, he married Isabel Strachey (20 February 1845 – 1920), a daughter of Richard Strachey of Ashwick Grove, Somerset, the third son of Sir Henry Strachey, 1st Baronet. Her mother, Anne Marie (or Anna Maria), was a daughter of Alexander Powell MP, a Tory member of parliament for Downton, Wiltshire. Baker's daughter was Noeline Baker, suffrage campaigner. After his death, his daughter edited his autobiography, A surveyor in New Zealand, 1857–1896, which was published in 1932.
