= Forest & Bird =

New Zealand conservation organisation

- Royal Forest and Bird Protection Society of New Zealand
- Te Reo o te Taiao (Māori)
- Formation: 1923; 103 years ago
- Type: Non-governmental organisation
- Legal status: Charity
- Purpose: Conservation
- Headquarters: Wellington, New Zealand
- President: Kate Graeme
- Chief executive: Sam Rowland
- Website: forestandbird.org.nz

Forest & Bird (Māori: Te Reo o te Taiao), also known by its formal name as the Royal Forest and Bird Protection Society of New Zealand, is an independent environmental organisation and charity specialising in the protection and conservation of New Zealand's indigenous flora and fauna and unique wild places and natural ecosystems. The organisation was established in 1923. As of 2026 Forest & Bird has 43 branches located in urban and rural centres throughout New Zealand and owns 38 reserves. Branches are volunteer-led and engage in conservation projects and advocacy on a community, regional and national basis. Forest & Bird also has staff across the country and offices in Auckland, Christchurch, and Wellington. Forest & Bird publishes a quarterly magazine Forest & Bird, one of New Zealand's definitive natural history and conservation publications. They also publish a quarterly magazine for children called Wild Things.

Forest & Bird has published a comprehensive commentary book on environmental law in New Zealand. Forest & Bird are also actively engaged in advocating and lobbying for resource management law and practices to more consistently protect ecosystems.

== History ==
Logo in use until November 2009

=== 20th century ===
Forest & Bird was founded as the Native Bird Protection Society in 1923. Later renamed as the Royal Forest and Bird Protection Society of New Zealand, it has consistently advocated conservation issues, particularly for forested land.

Val Sanderson is acknowledged as the founder of Forest & Bird. In 1921, after his return from the First World War, the then Captain Val Sanderson was angered that the Kapiti Island wildlife reserve was unfenced and extensively damaged by cattle, sheep and goats. Sanderson campaigned for better management of Kapiti Island and succeeded in having it re-dedicated as a Wildlife Reserve. After this success, Sanderson held a public meeting in March 1923 which established the Native Bird Protection Society with Sir Thomas Mackenzie as the Society's first President. The New Zealand Forestry League, a forest conservation group already existed but it gradually died out. In 1935 Mackenzie and Sanderson renamed the society the Forest and Bird Protection Society of New Zealand. Sanderson drove an expansion of the society's range of interests into such areas as soil erosion and use of native trees for soil stabilisation. He became the president in 1933 a position which he held until his death in 1945 aged 79.

Until the 1970s, the Royal Forest and Bird Protection Society remained the only New Zealand environmental group. However, in October 1971 the New Zealand Government proposed to harvest large areas of native South Island lowland beech forest with half the cleared area to be converted to exotic Pinus radiata. Along with the Save Manapouri campaign, the native forest harvesting prompted more public awareness of conservation and the formation of new environmental groups such as the Beech Forest Action Committee. In response to the native forest harvesting, on 4 July 1975 Forest & Bird and Beech Forest Action Committee started the Maruia Declaration as a public petition demanding an end to native forest logging and legal recognition of native forests. The Maruia Declaration was submitted to the New Zealand Government in 1977.

=== 21st century ===
From 2005 the society has held an annual poll Bird of the Year, voted on by the public. Winners to date include the kākāpō, the tūī and the New Zealand long-tailed bat.

In 2021, all proceeds from Lorde's Te Ao Mārama EP went to Forest & Bird as well as the Te Hua Kawariki Charitable Trust.

In April 2022, Nicola Toki took over from Kevin Hague as Chief Executive of Forest & Bird.

In November 2026, Forest & Bird confirmed that its database had been hacked on 18 November. As a result of the hack, supporters' personal details including names, phones, email addresses, payment card details, dates of birth and physical addresses had been accessed by an unauthorised party. Chief executive Sam Rowland confirmed that Forest & Bird had taken steps to secure its system, alerted affected individuals and warned supporters about scam emails, phone calls and text messages.

=== Centenary ===
The first 100 years of the Society is detailed in Force of nature: te aumangea o te ao tūroa : a conservation history of Forest & Bird 1923-2023.

== Campaigns ==
- 1970s – Lake Manapouri
- 1980s – 1990s Native forest conservation
- 2006 – Petition to increase protection of the New Zealand sea lion
- Living Rivers
- South Island High Country
- Dawn Chorus (Terrestrial Biodiversity)
- 2004 Marine Conservation – the Best Fish Guide. Since 2004, Forest & Bird have published the Best Fish Guide which listed 62 commercial fisheries, rated according to the contribution to a healthy marine environment. The 2004 guide considered that none of the species of fish documented were ecologically safe to catch and eat.
- 2009 – 2010: Preventing large-scale irrigation schemes in the Mackenzie Basin
- 2009 – A campaign to save NZ's conservation areas from being mined.
- 2009 – A campaign to save NZ's iconic rivers from being dammed.
- 2011 – 2012 Opposition to the Escarpment Mine Project on the Denniston Plateau
- 2008 – 2012 Successfully opposing the damming of the Mōkihinui River

== Attitudes ==
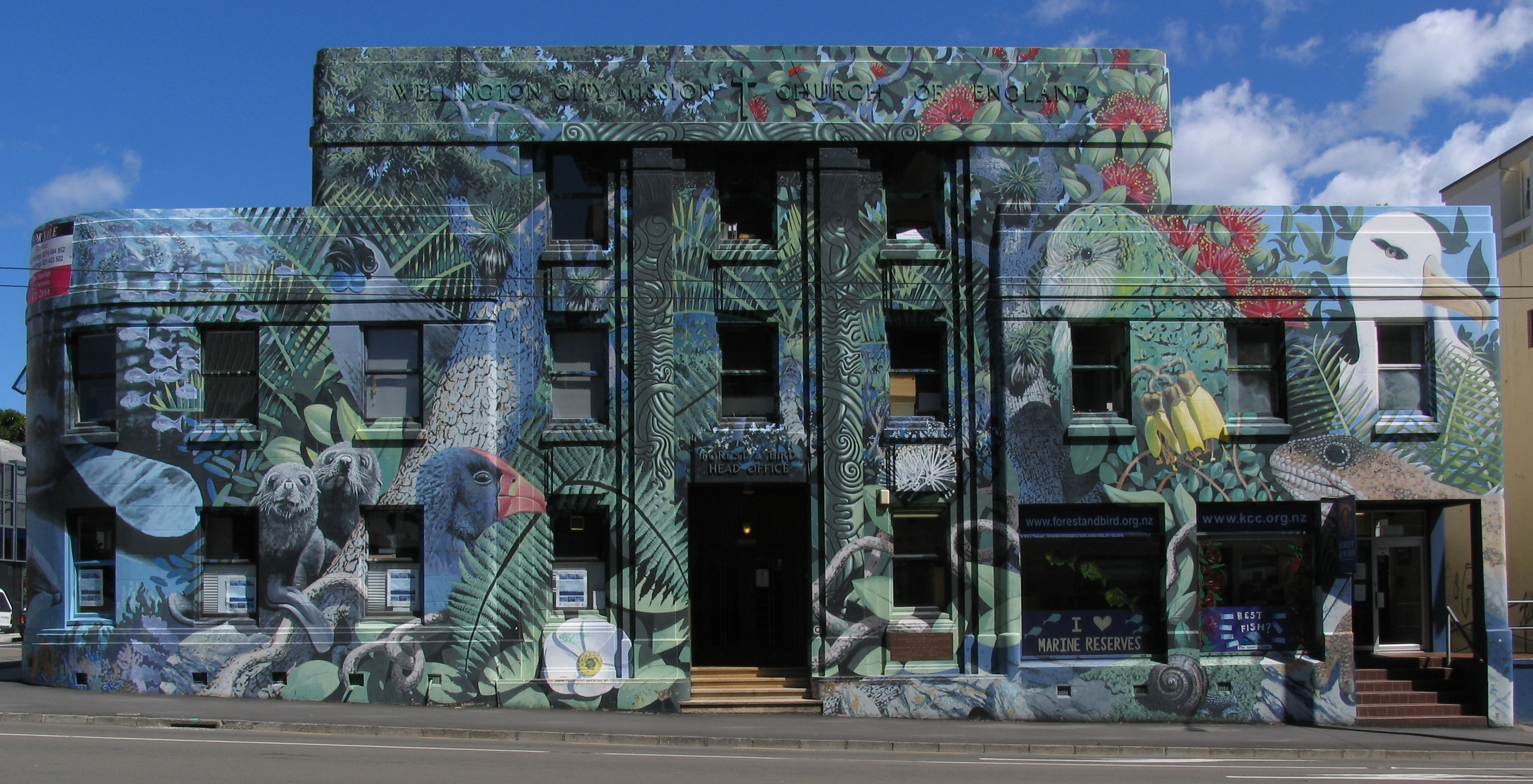
Former National Office building in Wellington, now at 205 Victoria Street

Perceptions of Forest & Bird are varied. While the group is one of the most well-known mainstream environmental groups of the country, it has also come under criticism, such as in 2010 when Prime Minister John Key accused them of engaging in "predictable scaremongering" when the group warned that a yet unreleased government report proposed to allow mining in 7000ha of high-value conservation land in Paparoa National Park, Great Barrier Island and the Coromandel Peninsula. Key also labelled news coverage quoting Forest & Bird's revelations of the Government's intentions for mining conservation land as "hysterical".

A week later, as predicted by Forest & Bird, the Government released the "Schedule 4 stocktake" proposal to open up 7058 hectares of protected conservation land for mining. Parts of the Coromandel Peninsula, Great Barrier Island, and parts of Paparoa National Park were proposed for removal from Schedule Four of the Crown Minerals Act 1991, which otherwise prevents mining. Journalist John Armstrong commented that "Forest and Bird knocked the Government sideways with leaked information revealing the extent of National's plans to open up land currently off limits to mining companies" and that the Government was suffering from hysteria if any one was.

After 40,000 people marched in Auckland in protest against the proposal, and after the vast majority of 37,552 public submissions opposed the proposal, the Government announced that no conservation land would be removed from Schedule 4 to allow mining.

== Publications ==
- Harris, Rob (ed.) (2004). Handbook of Environmental Law (1st ed.). Wellington: Royal Forest and Bird Protection Society of New Zealand Inc., ISBN 0-9597851-8-3. The work has been described as "a comprehensive guide to New Zealand's environmental law".
