= Beech Forest Action Committee =

New Zealand environmental organisation

The Beech Forest Action Committee was an environmental organisation based in New Zealand.

It was formed in the 1970s as a grassroots group in Auckland to protest against native forest logging. The group was not totally opposed to the logging but wished to see it done at a sustainable rate.

The Beech Forest Action Committee would eventually become the Native Forest Action Council.

== See also ==
- Conservation in New Zealand
