= Burt (surname) =

Burt is an English surname. Notable people with the surname include:

- Albert Levi Burt (1843–1903), book publisher
- Adam Burt (born 1969), American ice hockey defenseman
- Al Burt (1927–2008), American journalist
- Albin R. Burt (1783–1842), English engraver and portrait-painter
- Alexander Burt (1884–1967), Scottish field hockey player
- Alfred Burt (1920–1954), American jazz musician
- Alfred Alexander Burt (1895–1962), English recipient of the Victoria Cross
- Burt Memorial Hall (1888–1971), Canadian historian
- Alistair Burt (born 1955), British politician
- Andre Dontrel Burt Jr. (born 2001), American rapper and singer, known as SoFaygo
- Andrew Burt (1945–2018), British actor
- Andrew S. Burt (1839–1915), American general
- Archibald Burt (1810–1879), British lawyer and first Chief Justice of the Supreme Court of Western Australia
- Armistead Burt (1802–1883), American politician
- Arthur Campbell Burt (1892–1950), Canadian veterinarian and politician
- Benjamin Burt (1729–1805), American silversmith and diplomat
- Benjamin Burt (surgeon), Australian ophthalmologist and surgeon
- Bob Burt (born 1941), American football coach
- Bobby Burt (1934–2017), Australian rules footballer
- Bryce Chudleigh Burt (1881–1943), British administrator in India
- Camille Burt (born 2000), Canadian curler
- Chad Burt (born 1988), American soccer player and coach
- Charles Burt (1823–1892), Scottish-born American artist and engraver
- Sir Charles Burt (1832–1913), solicitor and local politician in Richmond, Surrey
- Clare Burt, English actress and singer
- Clarissa Burt (born 1959), Italian-American actress
- Cyril Burt (1883–1971), British psychologist
- Dan Burt (born 1970), American basketball coach
- Daniel Burt, several people
- Daniel Raymond Burt (1804–1884), American legislator and businessman
- Dave Burt (born 1937), Australian rules footballer
- David Burt (born 1953), British actor
- David Burt (disambiguation), several people
- DeAnna Burt (born 1969), United States Space Force officer
- Donald Graham Burt, American production designer
- E. J. Burt (born 1977), American football defensive lineman
- Edmund Burt (died 1755), English author and rent collector
- Edward Burt, several people
- Edwin C. Burt (1818–1884), American shoe manufacturer
- Emily Burt (born 1975), American soccer player
- Erasmus Burt (c.1820-1861), American physician, politician, and soldier
- Francis Burt (judge) (1918–2004), Governor of Western Australia
- Francis Burt (Nebraska governor) (1807–1854), first governor of the Nebraska Territory
- Frank Burt, several people
- Friend H. Burt (1808–1889), American tanner and politician
- George Burt (disambiguation), several people
- Gordon Onslow Hilbury Burt (1893–1968), New Zealand photographer
- Guy Burt (born 1972), English novelist and screenwriter
- Hal Burt (1900–1979), American football player
- Harry Burt (1875–1926), American confectioner
- Heinz Burt (1942–2000), British singer, best known by his first name
- Helen Burt, British-Canadian pharmaceutical scientist
- Henry Burt (1875–1960), British sport shooter
- Hilma Burt, American brothel keeper
- Horace G. Burt (1849–1913), American railroad engineer
- Ian Burt (born 1937), Australian rules footballer
- Jake Burt (born 1996), Canadian football player
- James Burt (disambiguation), several people
- Jim Burt (disambiguation), several people
- Jo Burt (born 1956), British heavy metal bassist
- Joan Burt (1930–2021), Canadian architect and educator
- Joanna Burt, Canadian opera singer
- John Burt, several people
- John Graham MacDonald Burt (1809–1868), Scottish physician
- John Mowlem Burt (1845–1918), British civil contractor
- Jonah Burt (born 1994), Canadian judoka athlete
- Jordan Burt (born 1990), American soccer player
- Kaitlin Burt (born 1997), American ice hockey goaltender
- Karen Burt (1954–1997), British engineer and campaigner
- Katharine Newlin Burt (1882–1977), American novelist and film scenarist
- Kelvin Burt (born 1967), British auto racing driver
- Kerry Burt (born 1964), American politician
- Laura Burt (1872–1952), a British-born actress, active in the USA
- Leo Burt (born 1948), indicted American bomber
- Leonard Burt (1892–1983), British police officer
- Leonard Burt (1932–2010), British police officer
- Liam Burt (born 1999), Scottish footballer
- Locke Burt, American politician
- Lorely Burt (born 1954), British politician
- Lorraine Burt (born 1961), English swimmer
- Luke Burt (born 1981), Australian professional rugby league player
- Lulu May Burt (1865–1953), American actress and singer, better known as Helen Bertram
- Mabel Wharekawa-Burt New Zealand Māori film and television actress
- Marshall Burt (born 1976), Wyoming state representative
- Martin Burt (born 1957), Paraguayan social entrepreneur, author and politician
- Marvin Burt (1905–1883), American politician
- Mary Annie de Burgh Burt (1874 -1916) sister in the Scottish Women's Hospital, World War One
- Mary Towne Burt (1842–1898), American reformer, publisher, benefactor
- Matthew Burt (born 1951), British furniture designer-maker
- Max Burt (born 1988), Canadian volleyball player
- Maxwell Struthers Burt (1882–1954), American novelist, poet, and short-story writer
- Mick Burt (died 2014), original drummer of British pop rock duo Chas & Dave
- Murray Burt (1943–2023), New Zealand motorcycle speedway rider
- Nathaniel Burt (1913–2003), American composer, writer and social historian
- Nathaniel Clark Burt (1825–1874), American Presbyterian clergyman
- Nicholas Burt (1621 ? — after 1689), English actor
- Olive Burt (1894–1991), American teacher, journalist and folklorist
- Patsy Burt (1928–2001), British racing driver
- Peter Burt (1944–2017), Scottish businessman
- Richard Burt (disambiguation), several people
- Richard R. Burt (born 1947), American businessman and diplomat
- Robert Burt (1873–1955) African-American physician and surgeon
- Robert F. Burt (1948–2014) American Navy officer and chaplain
- Ronald Stuart Burt (born 1949), American sociologist
- Roy E. Burt (1890–1967), American Methodist clergyman and socialist politician
- S. Alexandra Burt, American psychologist and behavior geneticist
- Selby Burt (1903–1959), Australian cricketer
- Septimus Burt (1847–1919), Western Australian lawyer, politician and grazier
- Silas W. Burt (1830–1912), American civil service reformer and naval officer
- Staci Burt (born 1978), American soccer player
- Syd Burt (1896–1969), Australian rules footballer
- Sydney Burt, First Premier of the Kingdom of Viti, and Attorney General of Fiji
- Thomas Burt (1837–1922), British trade unionist and Member of Parliament
- Tim Burt (born 1951), British geographer and academic
- Tim Burt (born 1972), English cricketer
- Vera Burt (1927–2017), New Zealand cricketer and field hockey player
- Vladimír Buřt (born 1964), Czech politician and environmentalist
- Warren Burt (born 1949), Australian composer
- Wellington R. Burt (1831–1919), American industrialist
- Weston Burt, American country music singer
- William Burt, several people
- William Austin Burt (1792–1858), American inventor, legislator, surveyor and millwright
- William Henry Burt (1876–1940), United States Army officer
- Zachary Burt (born 1993), Canadian judoka athlete

== See also ==
- Hugo Johnstone-Burt (born 1988), Scottish-Australian actor
- Tony Johnstone-Burt (born 1958), British naval officer
