= Burt (disambiguation) =

Burt is a male first name.

Burt may also refer to:

== Places ==
United States

- Burt, Iowa, a city
- Burt, Michigan, a census-designated place
- Burt, New York, an unincorporated hamlet
- Burt, North Dakota, an unincorporated community
- Burt County, Nebraska
- Burt Township, Alger County, Michigan
- Burt Township, Cheboygan County, Michigan
- Burt Lake, Michigan
- Burt–Cheney Farm, a historic farmstead in Bethlehem, New Hampshire
- Burt-Stark Mansion, National Historic Landmark at Abbeville, South Carolina
- F.N. Burt Company Factory, a historic former box factory at Buffalo, New York
- William Burt House, two entries in the National Register of Historic Places, USA

Elsewhere

- Burt, County Donegal, Ireland, a parish
  - Burt Castle, Ireland
  - Burt Distillery, a whiskey distillery
  - Burt GAA, a Gaelic Athletic Association club
- Burt Flickinger Center, an indoor venue located in downtown Buffalo, New York
- Burt Hall, a public building in Newcastle-on-Tyne
- Burt Island, Warwick, Bermuda
- Fort Burt, a colonial fort on Tortola, British Virgin Islands
- Division of Burt, an Australian federal electorate in Western Australia
- Burt Memorial Hall, a civic hall in Perth, Australia
- Burt Street, two streets in Australia
- Burt Rocks, Oates Land, Antarctica

== Other uses ==
- Burt (surname)
- Burt Award for First Nations, Inuit and Métis Literature, a Canadian literary award
- Burt Committee, a British government committee on housing policy during World War II
- Burt Hill Architects, an American architectural firm
- Burt Retractable Bindings, a type of plate-style snow ski binding
- Burt strut, a timing accessory on racing cars
- Burt's Bees, an American personal care product company
- Burt's Brewery, an English independent brewery on the Isle of Wight
- Burt's solar compass, a surveying instrument using the sun's direction
- Burt v. Titlow, United States Supreme Court case
- 6078 Burt, an asteroid
- Burt (film), a 2025 American comedy-drama film

== See also ==
- Bert (disambiguation)
- Birt (disambiguation)
