= 1778 in literature =

This article contains information about the literary events and publications of 1778.

== Events ==
- October – On the death of her father Matthew Robinson, novelist Sarah Scott receives a legacy that enables her to give up writing.
- c. November – Printing of Nathaniel Brassey Halhed's Grammar of the Bengali Language in Hooghly for the British East India Company is completed, the first such grammar in English and the first publication using a Bengali typeface, devised by Charles Wilkins.
- unknown dates
  - A new edition of The Plays of William Shakespeare is published, edited by Samuel Johnson and George Steevens. It includes Edmond Malone's essay "An Attempt to Ascertain the Order in Which the Plays Attributed to Shakspeare Were Written".
  - Fanny Burney's first novel, the epistolary Evelina, or The History of a Young Lady's Entrance into the World, is published anonymously in London.

== New books ==
=== Fiction ===
- Anonymous – The Travels of Hildebrand Bowman, Esquire, into Carnovirria, Taupiniera, Olfactaria, and Auditante, in New-Zealand; in the Island of Bonhommica, and in the Powerful Kingdom of Luxo-Volupto, on the Great Southern Continent
- Fanny Burney (anonymously) – Evelina
- Georgiana Cavendish, Duchess of Devonshire (anonymously) – The Sylph (sometimes ascribed to Sophia Briscoe)
- Pierre-Louis Ginguené – Satire des Satires
- Ignacy Krasicki – Pan Podstoli, part 1
- Clara Reeve – The Old English Baron
- Lady Mary Walker – Munster Village

=== Children ===
- Mrs. Barbauld
  - Lessons for Children of Two to Three
  - Lessons for Children of Three (two parts, a fourth book, for four-year-olds, in 1779)

=== Drama ===
- Henry Brooke – collected plays
- Elizabeth Craven – The Sleep Walker
- Richard Cumberland
  - The Battle of Hastings
  - The Princess of Parma
- Charles Dibdin – Poor Vulcan
- Samuel Foote
  - The Devil upon Two Sticks
  - The Nabob
  - The Taylors
- Jean-François de La Harpe – Les Barmecides
- John Home – Alfred
- Hannah More – Percy
- John O'Keeffe – Tony Lumpkin in Town
- Samuel Jackson Pratt – Joseph Andrews
- Richard Brinsley Sheridan – The Camp

=== Poetry ===
- John Codrington Bampfylde – Sixteen Sonnets
- Thomas Chatterton (suicide 1770) – Miscellanies
- William Combe – The Auction
- Gaspar Melchor de Jovellanos – Jovino a sus amigos de Sevilla
- Vicente Garcia de la Huerta – Obras poéticas
- George Ellis as "Sir Gregory Gander" – Poetical Tales
- William Hayley – A Poetical Epistle to an Eminent Painter
- Pedro Montengón – Odas
- John Scott – Moral Eclogues
- John Wolcot as "Peter Pindar" – A Poetical, Supplicating, Modest and Affecting Epistle to those Literary Colossuses the Reviewers

=== Non-fiction ===
- Edmund Burke – Two Letters on the Trade of Ireland
- Theodor Gottlieb von Hippel the Elder – Lebenslaufe nach aufsteigender Linie (begins publication)
- Lorenzo Hervás y Panduro – Idea dell'Universo
- Vicesimus Knox – Essays Moral and Literary
- Francisco Javier Llampillas – Saggio apologetic della letteratura spagnuola contro le pregiudicate opinion di alcuni moderni scritori italiani
- Ann Murry – Mentoria
- Thomas Pennant – A Tour in Wales
- Gilbert Stuart – A View of Society in Europe
- Thomas West – A Guide to the Lakes

== Births ==
- February 6 – Ugo Foscolo, Italian poet (died 1827)

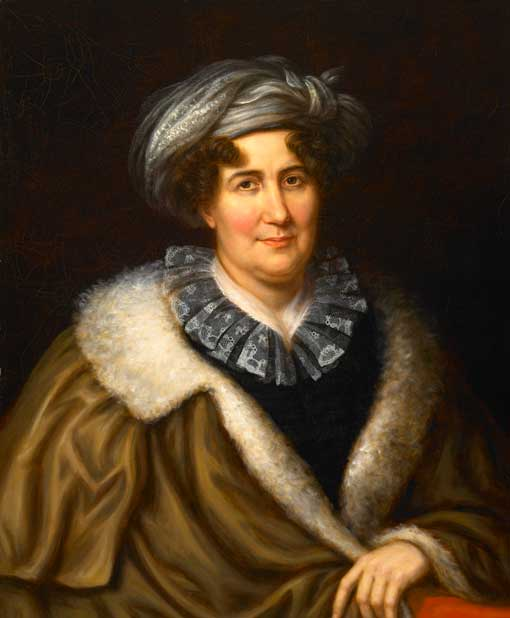
Margaret Bayard Smith

- February 20 – Margaret Bayard Smith, American writer (died 1844)
- February 22 – Gottfried Wilhelm Becker, German physician, writer and translator (died 1854)
- March 24 – Robert Fleming Gourlay, Scottish-born Canadian agriculturist and writer (died 1863)
- April 10 – William Hazlitt, English essayist and literary critic (died 1830)
- April 19 – Elizabeth Wynne Fremantle, English diarist (died 1857)
- May – John Peter Pruden, pioneer of western Canada, fur trader, and writer (died 1868)
- June 1 – Margaret Holford the younger, English poet and novelist (died 1852)
- June 28
  - Mariano Velazquez de la Cadena, Mexican grammarian and writer (died 1860)
  - John David Macbride, English Arabist and academic (died 1868)
- July 15 – Henry Joseph Monck Mason, Irish writer and musician (died 1858)
- August 22 – James Kirke Paulding, American novelist and politician (died 1860)
- August 23 – William Burt, English solicitor and writer (died 1826)
- September 2 – Michał Józef Römer, Polish politician and writer (died 1853)
- September 9 – Clemens Brentano, German novelist and poet (died 1842)
- October 22 – Javier de Burgos, Spanish writer, politician and jurist (died 1849)
- November 1 – Mary Brunton, Scottish novelist (died 1818)
- November 28 – Christoph Ernst von Houwald, German dramatist (died 1845)
- November 29 – Hryhorii Kvitka-Osnovianenko, Ukrainian writer, journalist, and playwright (died 1843)
- December 8 – George Crabb, British writer (died 1851)
- December 15 – John Penrose, Church of England clergyman and theologian (died 1859)
- December 16 – Ludwig Robert, German dramatist (died 1832)
- December 18 – Joseph Grimaldi, English autobiographer and clown (died 1837)
- unknown date – Mary Robinson (Maid of Buttermere), English literary muse (died 1837)

== Deaths ==
- January 10 – Eva König, German woman of letters (born 1736)
- February 10 – Mary Jones, English poet (born 1707)
- March 13 – Charles le Beau, French historian (born 1701)
- May 27 – Christian Tobias Damm, German philologist and theologian (born 1699)
- May 30 – Voltaire, French philosopher and satirist (born 1694)
- July 3 – Jean-Jacques Rousseau, French philosopher (born 1712)
- July 5
  - Antonio Collalto, Italian actor and dramatist (born 1713)
  - July 15 – James Townley, English dramatist (born 1714)
- October 6 – William Worthington, English theologian (born 1703)
- November 11 – Anne Steele, English poet and hymn-writer (born 1717)
- November 22 – Edward Rowe Mores, English antiquarian and scholar (born 1731)
