= Branding iron (disambiguation) =

A branding iron is a tool that uses a heated metal shape to leave a mark on objects or livestock.

Branding iron may also refer to:

- The Branding Iron, a 1920 American lost silent Western film
- The Branding Iron, a 1919 novel by Katharine Newlin Burt; basis for the film
- Branding Iron, a student newspaper at the University of Wyoming, US
