= James Burt =

James Burt may refer to:

- James Burt (broker) (1836–1892), American stock broker
- James M. Burt (1917–2006), World War II Medal of Honor recipient
- James C. Burt (1921–2012), American gynecologist who performed unconsented "love surgeries"
- Jim Burt (sportscaster) (1918–1993), South Dakota, USA broadcast pioneer who served as sportscaster at KELO-AM and at KELO-TV
- Jim Burt (American football) (born 1959), professional American football player for the New York Giants and San Francisco 49ers
- James Burt (cricketer) (1792–1858), English amateur cricketer
