= William Burt =

William Burt may refer to:

- William Burt (writer) (1778–1826), British miscellaneous writer
- William Austin Burt (1792–1858), American inventor
- William Burt (bishop) (1852–1936), British-American Methodist clergyman, bishop 1904–1924
- William Henry Burt (1876–1940), U.S. Army general
- William Burt (politician), American state senator in New Mexico

== See also ==
- William Burt Pope (1822–1903), theologian
- William Burt House (disambiguation)
- Burt (disambiguation)
