= Francis Burt =

Francis Burt may refer to:

- Sir Francis Burt (judge) (1918–2004), Australian jurist and governor of Western Australia
- Francis Burt (Nebraska governor) (1807–1854), American politician from South Carolina, governor of Nebraska Territory
- Francis Burt (composer) (1926–2012), British composer

== See also ==
- Frank Burt (disambiguation)
