= Stelios Kympouropoulos =

Greek politician

Stelios Kympouropoulos MEP
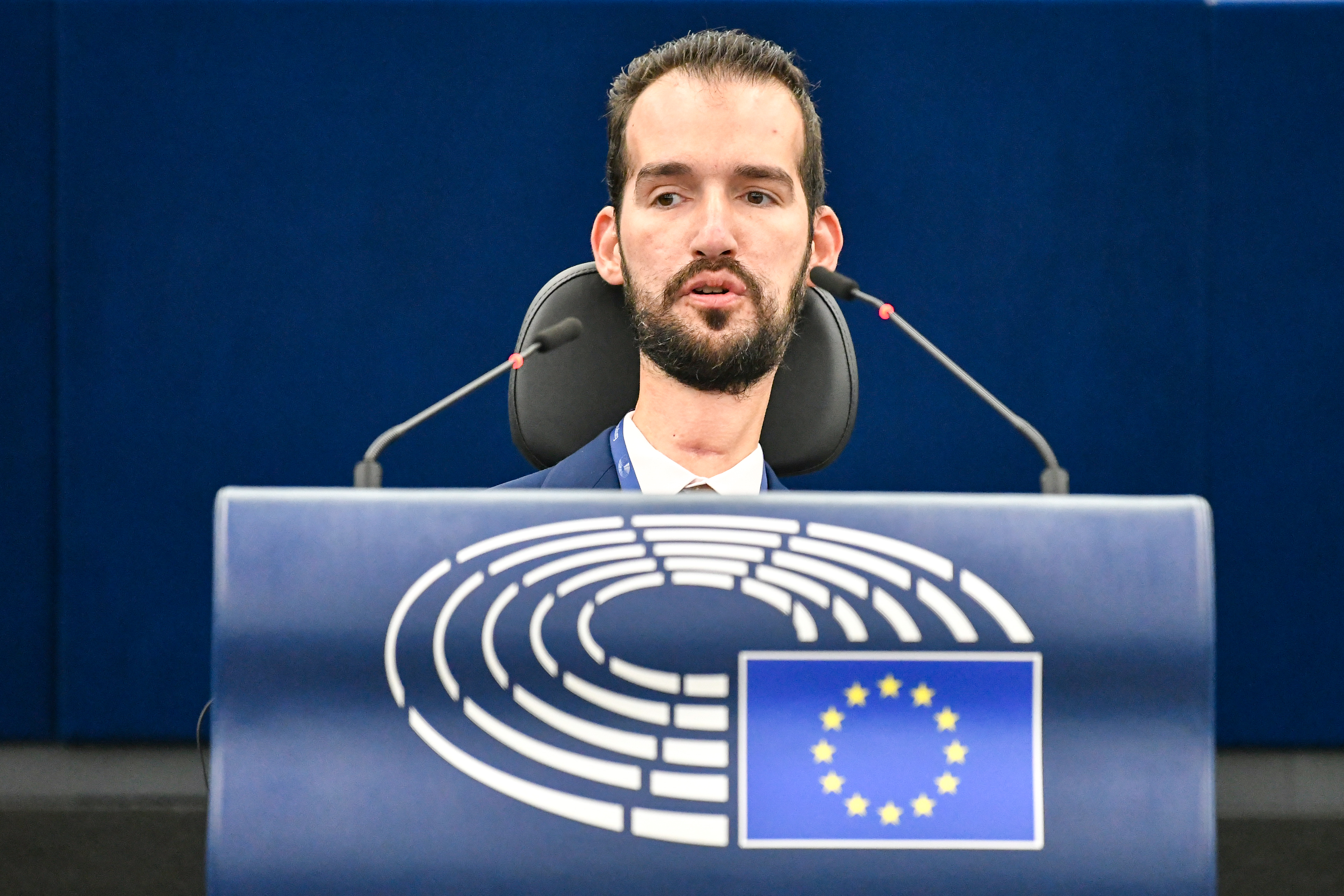

Member of the European Parliament for Greece
- In office 2 July 2019 – 16 July 2024

Personal details
- Born: 9 July 1985 (age 40) Athens, Greece
- Party: New Democracy
- Website: kympouropoulos.gr

Stelios Kympouropoulos (Greek: Στέλιος Κυμπουρόπουλος; born 9 July 1985) is a Greek psychiatrist and politician of the New Democracy party who has been serving as a Member of the European Parliament since the 2019 elections.

== Early life and education ==
He was born on 9 July 1985, in Athens. At the age of 14 months he was diagnosed with spinal muscular atrophy. At the age of 15 his case became the occasion to change the law on flag bearers in school parades.

In 2003 he was admitted to the Department of Medicine of the National and Kapodistrian University of Athens, from where he received his degree in medicine in 2010, with honours. From 2013 to 2015, in parallel with the exercise of Specialty, he attended postgraduate seminars on the subject of human psychosexual disorders. In 2014 he received a master's degree in "Mental Health Promotion - Prevention of Psychiatric Disorders". In 2016, he received a degree in psychiatry.

== Medical career ==
From 2016 until June 2019 he worked as Curator B 'at the 2nd University Psychiatric Clinic of the University General Hospital "Attikon".

== Political career ==
In 2013, he pioneered the organization of the first Greek delegation to the pan-European event "Freedom Drive", which became the springboard for the creation of the first Independent Living Organization of Greece, "I-Living!", which is an urban non-profit company run exclusively by individuals with a disability.

On February 20, 2019, his candidacy as MEP was announced with the ballot of New Democracy (ND), responding to an invitation-request of the president of ND, Kyriakos Mitsotakis.

The rights of disabled citizens were the subject of controversy between Syriza and ND, especially with the then Deputy Minister of Health, Pavlos Polakis. The reason for the minister's move was a post on the social networks of Kympouropoulos, in the capacity of ND candidate in the 2019 European Parliament elections.

In the European elections he was elected MEP, while he holds the national record of crosses of preference in European elections, i.e. 577,114 crosses.

He joined the team of the European People's Party (EPP Group). He is a member of the Committee on Employment and Social Affairs, of the Delegation for relations with the Mashreq countries and of the Delegation to the Parliamentary Assembly of the Union for the Mediterranean. In 2022, he joined the Special Committee on the COVID-19 pandemic. In addition, he is an alternate member of the Committee on Regional Development and the Subcommittee on Human Rights. He is also a member of the Disability Intergroup of the European Parliament.

In June 2023, Kympouropoulos was the recipient of the Health and Wellbeing Award at The Parliament Magazine's annual MEP Awards In March 2024, Kympouropoulos was one of twenty MEPs to be given a "Rising Star" award at that year's MEP Awards ceremony.
