= Fordney =

Fordney is a surname. Notable people with the surname include:

- Joseph W. Fordney (1853–1932), American politician
- Diane Fordney (born 1940), American physician

Fictional characters:

- Professor Fordney, character in Minute Mysteries, a syndicated column by Austin Ripley

== See also ==
- Fordney–McCumber Tariff, named after Joseph W. Fordney
