= Body and Soul (1927 film) =

American silent film

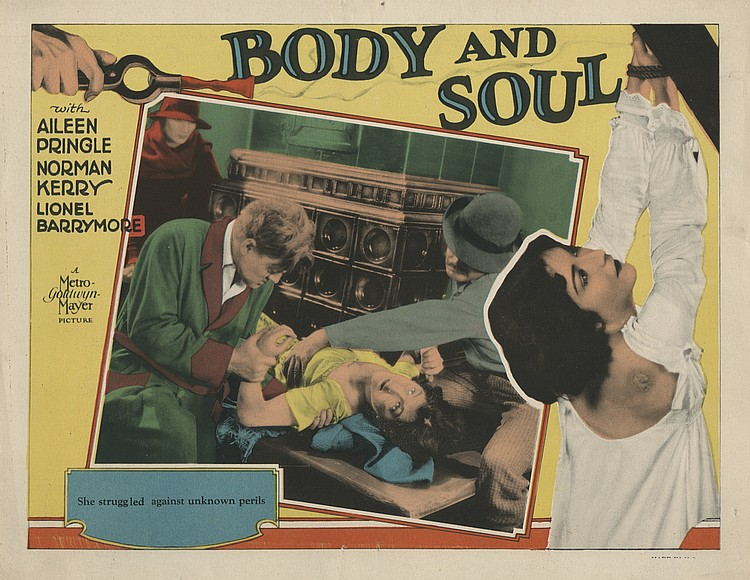
- Film poster
- Directed by: Reginald Barker; Nick Grinde (ass't director)
- Written by: Elliott J. Clawson
- Based on: 'Body and Soul"; 1919 story in Everybody's Magazine by Katharine Newlin Burt
- Starring: Aileen Pringle; Norman Kerry; Lionel Barrymore
- Cinematography: Percy Hilburn (*French)
- Edited by: William LeVanway
- Distributed by: Metro-Goldwyn-Mayer
- Release date: October 1, 1927
- Running time: 60 minutes
- Country: United States
- Languages: Silent film English intertitles

Body and Soul is a 1927 American silent film starring Aileen Pringle, Norman Kerry, and Lionel Barrymore. The film was directed by Reginald Barker. It is a remake of the 1920 film The Branding Iron also directed by Barker.

The film has been preserved by MGM and the George Eastman Museum.

== Plot summary ==
It is the story of a disgraced drunk surgeon (Lionel Barrymore) who leaves to start over in a small Alpine village in Switzerland. There, the surgeon becomes enamored of Hilda (Aileen Pringle), a maid at the hotel, and tricks her into marrying him on the basis that her lover, Ruffo (Norman Kerry), has left her. The surgeon's behavior turns violent after the wedding and ends with him dragging Hilda out of the village through the snow and marking her like cattle as the surgeon illustrates his descent into madness. Things go from bad to worse when Ruffo returns to stir up trouble and make the already volatile relationship even more complicated, although what precisely happens is not detailed in readily available information and is left to the reader's interpretation in this 60-minute Metro-Goldwyn-Mayer film.

== Cast ==
- Aileen Pringle as Hilda
- Norman Kerry as Ruffo
- Lionel Barrymore as Dr. Leyden
- T. Roy Barnes as the Postman

== See also ==
- Lionel Barrymore on stage, screen and radio
- The Branding Iron (1920)
