= Benjamin Burt =

Benjamin Burt may refer to:

- Benjamin Burt (silversmith) (1729–1805), American silversmith
- Benjamin Burt (surgeon), Australian ophthalmologist and surgeon

== See also ==
- Ben Burtt (born 1948), American sound designer and filmmaker
- Benjamin A. Burtt, American sound editor
