= Senator Burt =

Senator Burt may refer to:

- Marvin Burt (1905–1983), Illinois State Senate
- Wellington R. Burt (1831–1919), Michigan State Senate
- William Burt (politician) (fl. 2010s), New Mexico State Senate
