= Benjamin Burtt =

Benjamin Burtt may refer to:

- Ben Burtt (born 1948), American sound designer, film director, film editor, screenwriter, and voice actor
- Benjamin A. Burtt (born 1984), his son, American sound editor

== See also ==
- Benjamin Burt (disambiguation)
