= Birt (disambiguation) =

Birt is a surname.

Birt may also refer to:

- Birt Acres (1854–1918), photographer and film pioneer
- Birt (crater), a lunar impact crater named after William Radcliffe Birt
- Birt, a member of the flatfish family Scophthalmidae, related to the turbot and brill

== See also ==
- Bird (disambiguation)
- BIRT (disambiguation)
- Bert (disambiguation)
- Brit (disambiguation)
- Burt (disambiguation)
