= Diane Fordney =

American physician and sex therapist

Diane Sharon Fordney (September 28, 1940 – September 16, 2022) is an American physician and sex therapist best known for her work on sexual function and dysfunction. She has also published professionally as Diane S. Fordney-Settlage.

== Career ==
Fordney earned her BS in 1960 from University of Arizona and her M.D. in 1964 from University of California at Los Angeles. She later earned a M.S. in 1971 from University of California, Davis.

Her early work looked at mechanisms of sperm motility following intercourse. She also published findings about sexual experience among teen girls. In 1975 she wrote an overview of heterosexual dysfunction.

Fordney served as assistant professor, obstetrics and gynecology division of reproductive biology at the Los Angeles County-USC Medical Center. She then took a position as associate professor of obstetrics/gynecology and associate professor of psychiatry at the medical school of the Stony Brook University.

Fordney was an early critic of gynecologist James C. Burt and his unconsented surgeries on the vulvas of patients: "Dr. Burt is a nice person but he is a zealot and that makes him dangerous." She served on the subcommittee on psychosexual disorders for the third edition of the Diagnostic and Statistical Manual of Mental Disorders

During her tenure at the University of Arizona Medical Center’s fertility clinic, Fordney assisted in helping hundreds of couples with fertility issues bring babies to term.

== Selected publications ==
- Fordney Settlage DS, Motoshima M, Tredway, DR (1973). Sperm transport from the external cervical os to the Fallopian tubes in women: A time and quantitation study. Fertil Steril. 1973 Sep;24(9):655-61.
- DS Fordney Settlage, Baroff S, Cooper D (1973). Sexual experience of younger teenage girls seeking contraceptive assistance for the first time. Family Planning Perspectives, Vol. 5, No. 4 (Autumn, 1973), pp. 223–226
- Fordney-Settlage DS (1975). Heterosexual dysfunction: Evaluation of treatment procedures. Archives of Sexual Behavior, Volume 4, Number 4 / July, 1975
- Tredway DR, Umezaki CU, Mishell DR Jr, Settlage DS. Effect of intrauterine devices on sperm transport in the human being: preliminary report. Am J Obstet Gynecol. 1975 Dec 1;123(7):734-5.
- Fordney DS (1978). Dyspareunia and vaginismus. Clin Obstet Gynecol. 1978 Mar;21(1):205-21.
- Fordney-Settlage DS (1981). A review of cervical mucus and sperm interactions in humans. Int J Fertil. 1981;26(3):161-9.
