= Brigden =

Brigden may refer to:

== People ==
- Beatrice Brigden (1888–1977), Canadian social reformer
- Jim Brigden (1887–1950), Australian public servant
- Susan Brigden (born 1951), British historian
- Wallace Brigden (1916–2008), British cardiologist
- William Brigden (1916–2005), Canadian sprint canoer
- Zachariah Brigden (1734–1787), American silversmith

== Places ==
- Brigden, Ontario
