= The Leopardess =

1923 film by Henry Kolker

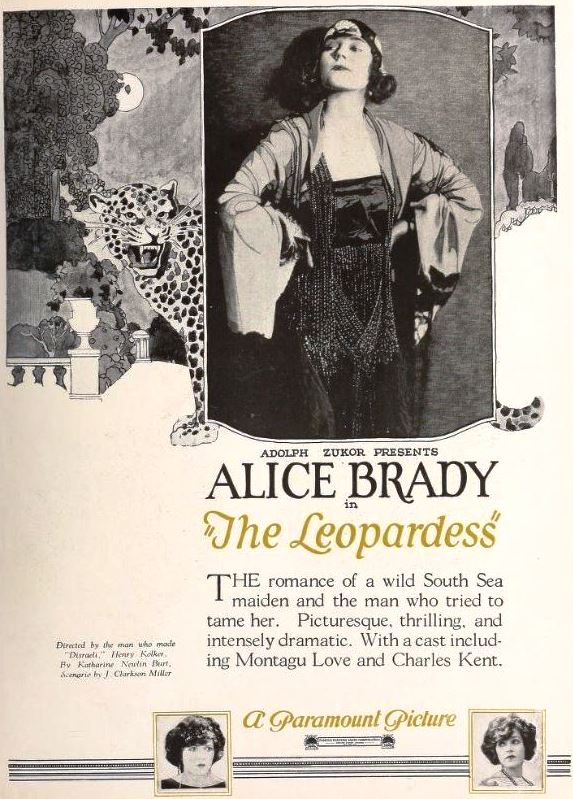
- Trade advertisement
- Directed by: Henry Kolker
- Written by: J. Clarkson Miller
- Story by: Katharine Newlin Burt
- Produced by: Adolph Zukor; Jesse L. Lasky
- Starring: Alice Brady
- Cinematography: Gilbert Warrenton
- Edited by: Thomas J. Geraghty
- Distributed by: Paramount Pictures
- Release date: March 23, 1923
- Running time: 5-6 reels (5,621 feet)
- Country: United States
- Language: Silent (English intertitles)

The Leopardess is a 1923 American silent South Seas melodrama film produced by Famous Players–Lasky and distributed by Paramount Pictures. The film was directed by Henry Kolker, and starred Alice Brady in her next to last silent film.

== Cast ==
- Alice Brady as Tiare
- Edward Langford as Captain Croft
- Montagu Love as Scott Quaigg
- Charles Kent as Angus McKenzie
- George Beranger as Pepe (credited as George Andre Beranger)
- Marguerite Forrest as Evoa
- Glorie Eller as Mamoe

== Preservation ==
With no copies of The Leopardess listed in any film archives, it is thought to be a lost film.

== See also ==
- List of lost films
