= David Burt =

David Burt may refer to:

- David Raitt Robertson Burt (1899–1983), Scottish zoologist
- David Burt (cricketer) (1901–?), New Zealand cricketer
- Dave Burt (born 1937), Australian rules footballer
- David Burt (actor) (born 1953), British actor
- David Burt (filtering advocate) (fl. 1992–2007), American librarian and content-control software advocate
- David Burt (politician) (born 1979), Bermudan politician
