= BIRT =

BIRT may refer to:

- Brain Injury Rehabilitation Trust, a provider of specialist brain injury rehabilitation in the UK
- BIRT Project (Business Intelligence and Reporting Tools), an open source software project
- BIRT, stock ticker symbol for Actuate Corporation
- Be it resolved that, a phrase that frequently begins an operative paragraph of a resolution
