= Singed Wings =

1922 film

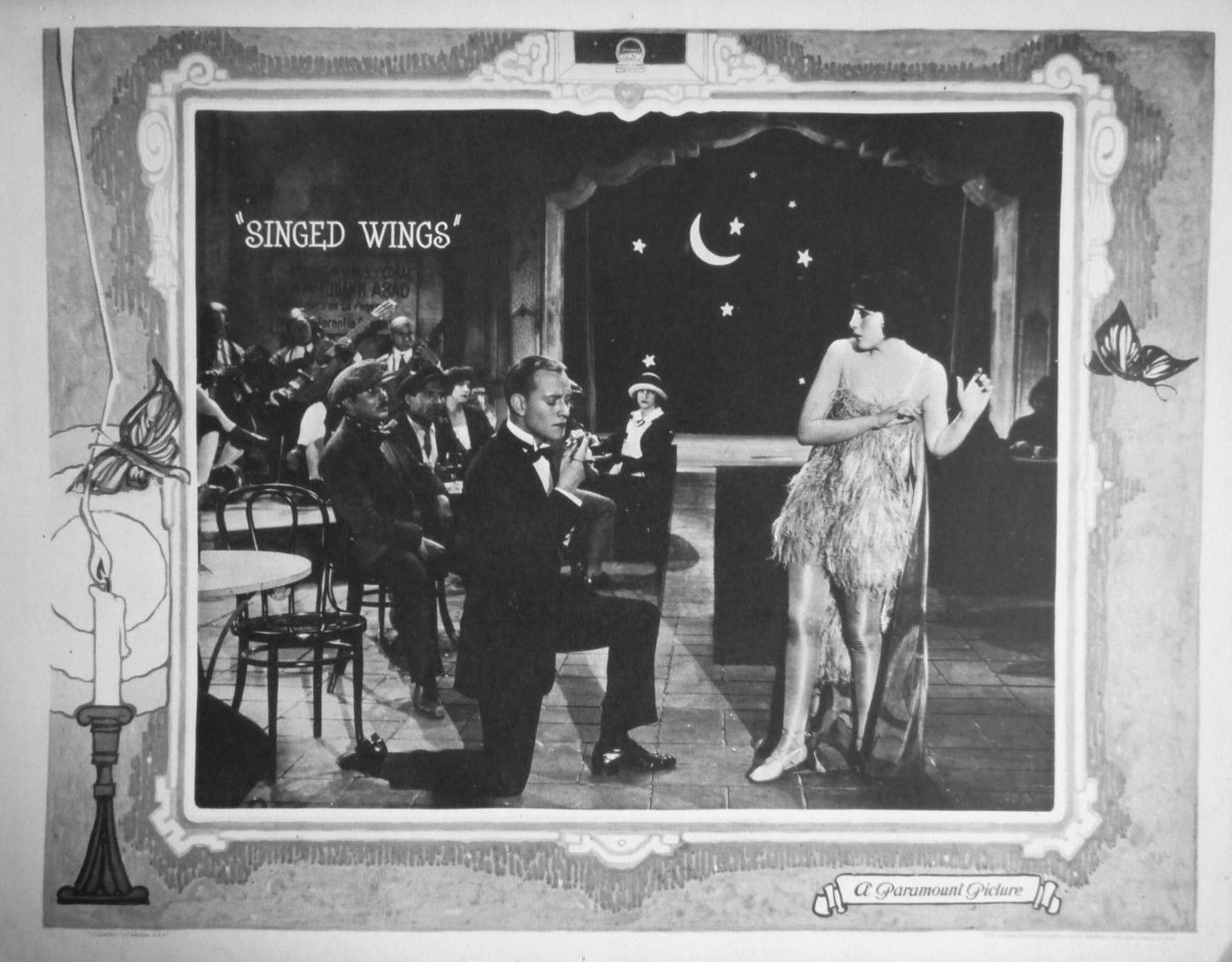
- Lobby card
- Directed by: Penrhyn Stanlaws
- Written by: Ewart Adamson (scenario); Edfrid A. Bingham (scenario)
- Based on: "Singed Wings" by Katharine Newlin Burt
- Produced by: Adolph Zukor; Jesse Lasky
- Starring: Bebe Daniels; Conrad Nagel
- Cinematography: Paul Perry
- Distributed by: Paramount Pictures
- Release date: November 26, 1922
- Running time: 8 reels
- Country: United States
- Language: Silent (English intertitles)

Singed Wings is a lost 1922 American silent romantic drama film directed by Penrhyn Stanlaws and starring Bebe Daniels. Famous Players–Lasky the film, which was released through Paramount Pictures.

== Cast ==
- Bebe Daniels as Bonita della Guerda
- Conrad Nagel as Peter Gordon
- Adolphe Menjou as Bliss Gordon
- Robert Brower as Don José della Guerda
- Ernest Torrence as Emilio, a clown
- Mabel Trunnelle as Eve Gordon
