= Edward Burt =

Edward Burt may refer to:

- Edmund Burt (died 1755), also known as Edward, Scottish military figure, engineer and author
- Edward Angus Burt (1859–1939), American mycologist
- Edward David Burt (born 1978), Premier of Bermuda
