= The Way of a Girl =

1925 film

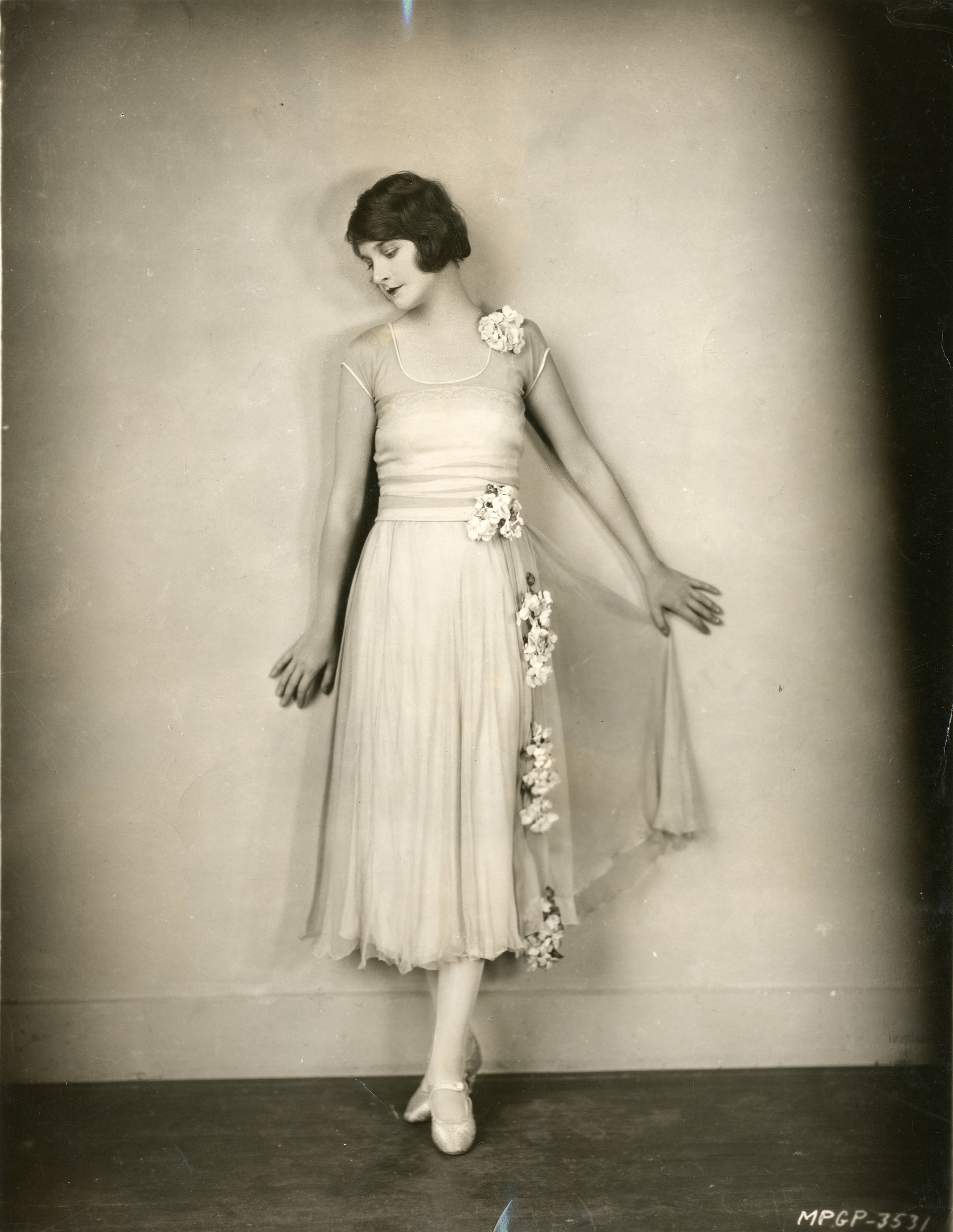
- Boardman in a costume study for the film
- Directed by: Robert G. Vignola
- Written by: Albert S. Le Vino (screenplay); Katharine Newlin Burt (story)
- Produced by: Louis B. Mayer; Irving Thalberg
- Starring: Eleanor Boardman; Matt Moore; William Russell
- Cinematography: John Arnold
- Distributed by: Metro-Goldwyn-Mayer
- Release date: March 29, 1925
- Running time: 60 minutes
- Country: United States
- Language: Silent (English intertitles)

The Way of a Girl is a 1925 American silent drama film starring Eleanor Boardman, Matt Moore, and William Russell. The film was directed by Robert G. Vignola, and the screenplay written by Albert S. Le Vino. It is based on a story by Katharine Newlin Burt. The Way of a Girl survives.

The female lead, Eleanor Boardman, stars in one of the 11 movies she did for Metro-Goldwyn-Mayer in the first two years of the life of the studio.

== Plot ==
As described in a film magazine review, overhearing her fiancé tell her father that he "knows all about handling girls," Rosamond decides to show him that he knows nothing about it. Her escapades land her in jail for speeding. Her fiancé rescues her from her sentence of ten days. Still headstrong in her belief that no man can subdue her, she recklessly drives over an embankment and is rescued by two criminals that are hiding in a cave. After escaping from what appears to be certain death, she is rescued and "tamed," admitting her submission.

== Cast ==
- Eleanor Boardman as Rosamond
- Matt Moore as George
- William Russell as Brand
- Matthew Betz as Matt
- Charles K. French as the Police Judge
