= John Burt =

John Burt may refer to:

- John Burt (footballer), English footballer
- John Burt (rugby union) (1874–1933), New Zealand rugby union player, cricketer and businessman
- John Burt (field hockey) (1877–1935), Scottish field hockey player
- John Burt (anti-abortion activist) (1938–2013), American anti-abortion activist and child-molester
- John Graham MacDonald Burt (1809–1868), Scottish physician and author
- John H. Burt (1918–2009), bishop of the Episcopal Diocese of Ohio
- John Mowlem Burt (1845–1918), British businessman in the construction industry
- John Burt (New Hampshire politician)

== See also ==
- John Birt, Baron Birt, former director-general of the BBC
