= Bert =

Bert or BERT may refer to:

== Places ==
- Berd, Armenia, also known as Bert
- Bert, Allier, a commune in the French département of Allier
- Bert, West Virginia, US

== Science and technology ==
- Bit error rate test, a testing method for digital communication circuits
- Bit error rate tester, a test equipment used for testing the bit error rate of digital communication circuits
- HP Bert, a CPU in certain Hewlett-Packard programmable calculators
- BERT (language model) (Bidirectional Encoder Representations from Transformers), a natural language processing technique
- Storm Bert, in Britain and Ireland in November 2024

== Entertainment and sports ==
- Bert, a type of shot in Pickleball
- Bert Diaries, Swedish children's novels, TV series and film
- Bert (TV series), a Swedish TV series based on Bert Diaries
- Q*bert, a game whose Macintosh versions were known as Bert

== Other uses ==
- Bert (name), a given name and a surname
- Bert (horse), foaled 1934

== See also ==
- Birt (disambiguation)
- Burt (disambiguation)
- Bird (disambiguation)
