= The Silent Rider =

1927 film

- Directed by: Lynn Reynolds
- Written by: Joseph F. Poland
- Based on: short story "The Red-Headed Husband" by Katharine Newlin Burt
- Produced by: Carl Laemmle
- Starring: Hoot Gibson
- Cinematography: Harry Neumann
- Distributed by: Universal Pictures
- Release date: January 2, 1927
- Running time: 6 reels
- Country: United States
- Languages: Silent; English intertitles

The Silent Rider is a lost 1927 American silent Western film starring Hoot Gibson and directed by Lynn Reynolds. It was produced and released by Universal Pictures as a Jewel-Feature.

== Cast ==
- Hoot Gibson - Jerry Alton
- Blanche Mehaffey - Marian Faer
- Ethan Laidlaw - Red Wender
- Otis Harlan - Sourdough Jackson
- Wendell Phillips Franklin - Tommy
- Arthur Morrison - Green
- Nora Cecil - Mrs. Randall
- Dick La Reno - Baldy
- Richard L'Estrange - Blondy (* Dick L'Estrange)
