= Horace G. Burt =

American railway executive (1849–1913)

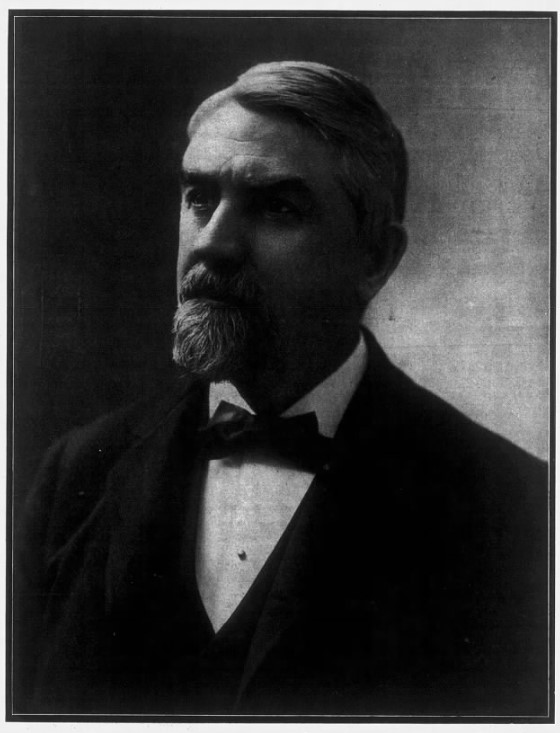

Horace Greeley Burt (Jan 1849 – May 19, 1913) was President of Union Pacific Railroad from 1898 until 1904. He was born in Terre Haute, Indiana. He began his Railway service in 1868 with Chicago and North Western Railway as a resident engineer from 1873 until 1881. He was Division superintendent from 1881 until 1887, Chief engineer from August 1887 until November 1888. He was General Manager of Fremont, Elkhorn and Missouri Valley Railroad from 1888 until 1896. He was general manager of Chicago, Milwaukee, St. Paul and Pacific Railroad from July until October 1896. He was 3rd Vice president of Chicago and North Western Railway from 1896 until 1898. He traveled around the world from 1904 until 1905. He was receiver of Chicago Great Western Railway from January until September 1909. In 1911 he was chief engineer of commission of investigation smoke abatement and electrification of railway terminals. He died in Oak Park, Illinois and is buried in Highland Lawn Cemetery in Terre Haute.

Preceded by W. S. Pierce	President of Union Pacific Railroad; 1898 – 1904	Succeeded by E. H. Harriman
