= Brainkind =

United Kingdom-based charity

Brainkind (formerly The Disabilities Trust) is a UK charity founded in the 1980s in Burgess Hill, West Sussex, as The Disabled Housing Trust. Brainkind provides residential, day services, care, rehabilitation and support to meet the needs of people with acquired brain injury (ABI), traumatic brain injury (TBI) and neurological conditions. Brainkind also provides care and support to enable living in the community and support at home.

== Aims ==
The charity's stated values declare that "People with disabilities are at the heart of all that we do. While meeting care and support needs, we will endeavour at all times to enhance their independence and promote the rights of disabled people as equal members of society."

== History ==
Between 1979 and 1989, Brainkind opened two residential services in Sussex for adults with physical disabilities. Both these services were formally opened by Diana, Princess of Wales.

In 1991, the Brain Injury Rehabilitation Trust (BIRT) was established, and The Trust's first specialist brain injury rehabilitation service was opened in Milton Keynes. The Brain Injury Rehabilitation Trust grew to be one of Europe's largest providers of specialist brain injury rehabilitation.

Brainkind continued to grow throughout the 1990s and 2000s and extended its provision to include services for adults with autism and special education for children with autism and Asperger syndrome.

In September 2023, The Disabilities Trust rebranded to Brainkind.

== Activities ==
Brainkind campaigns on behalf of the people who use their services to give a voice to people who are disabled and raise awareness of key issues.

== Related Organisations ==
Brain Injury Rehabilitation Trust (BIRT) was established in 1991 to provide clinical neurobehavioural rehabilitation for people with acquired and/or traumatic brain injuries.

The Disabilities Trust Foundation was founded in 2009 to utilise the Trust's knowledge through research and the piloting of new ideas designed to initiate and enhance good practice and direct or influence policy within the fields of Brain Injury, Learning Disabilities, Autism and Physical Disabilities.
