= Burt Street =

Burt Street may refer to:

- Burt Street, Boulder, Australia
- Burt Street, Fremantle, Australia
