= Daniel Burt =

Daniel Burt may refer to:

- Daniel Burt (comedian), writer and comedian from Victoria, Australia
- Daniel Burt (author), American author of several bestselling books
- Daniel Burt (politician) (1847–1924), Ontario farmer and political figure
- Daniel Raymond Burt (1804–1884), American businessman and territorial legislator
- Dan Burt (born 1970), American basketball coach
