= Benjamin Burt (silversmith) =

American silversmith

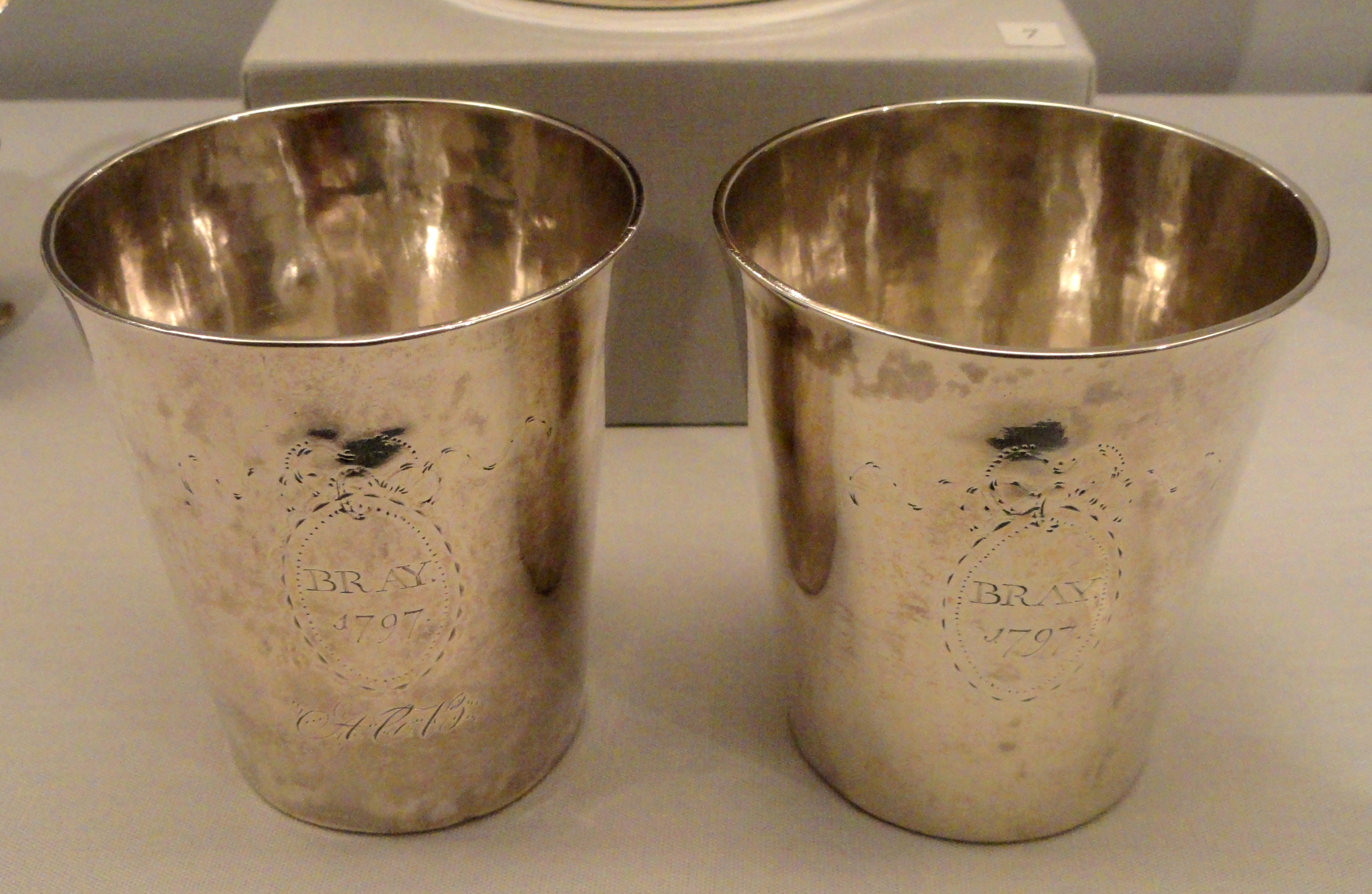
Pair of beakers, Benjamin Burt, Boston, 1797

Benjamin Burt (December 29, 1729 - October 9, 1805) was an American silversmith active in Boston, and uncle to Major Samuel Shaw, who sailed on the Empress of China (1783) as the first American consul to China.

According to the Burt family Bible, now in the Museum of Fine Arts, Boston, Burt was born in Boston and trained by his father, silversmith John Burt (1692/3-1745), who upon his death left a very substantial estate of £6,460-4-9. By 1754, Burt's older brother Samuel had died, Benjamin had married Joan Hooten, and he took over the family business. He was both prolific and highly successful as a silversmith, second only to Paul Revere in the quantity of silver that he produced, and was selected to lead Boston's goldsmiths in 1800 in the memorial procession after George Washington's death. At his death, his estate was appraised at $4,788.52, including "207 Oz. 15 dwt. of silver" and he bequeathed to Samuel Waters "all my Goldsmith's working tools now in my shop," having himself bought Zachariah Brigden's tools and silver from his widow in 1787. His sons William (born 1723 but died young), Samuel (1724–54), and Benjamin (1729–1804) succeeded him in the family business.
