= Pedro Montengón =

Spanish writer

Pedro Montengón (1745–1824) was a Spanish writer. He was ordained a priest, of the Society of Jesus.

== Works ==
=== Verse ===
- Tota Aristotelaeorum schola quatuor sermons ad Luc. Sextilium, Marseille, 1770.
- Odes, (1778).

=== Narrative prose ===
- Eusebio (1786–1788), second edition (revised) 1807–1808.
- Antenor (1788)
- The Rodrigo (1793)
- Eudoxia, daughter of Belisario (1793)
- The Mirtilo or pastoralists (1795)

=== Miscellaneous ===
- Erudite and curious trifles for public instruction

=== Epic ===
- The Conquest of Mexico (1820).

=== Theatre ===
- Matilde
- The impostor
- The idle
- The greedy lover

=== Translations ===
- Agamemnon of Sophocles.
- Aegisthus and Clytemnestra of Sophocles.
- Emon Oedipus by Sophocles.
- Antigone, by Sophocles.
- Fingal of Ossian (James Macpherson)
- Temora, of Ossian (James MacPherson)
