= Gordon Onslow Hilbury Burt =

New Zealand photographer

Gordon Onslow Hilbury Burt (27 November 1893 – 9 July 1968) was a photographer who pioneered the use of photography in advertising in New Zealand. He was born on 27 November 1893. He died in Lower Hutt on 9 July 1968.
