= Selby Burt =

Australian cricketer

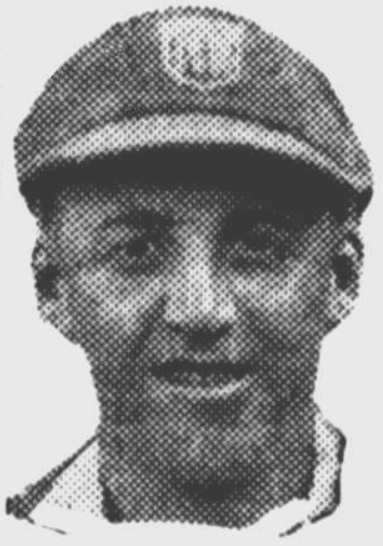

Personal information
- Born: 12 November 1903; Hillgrove, New South Wales, Australia
- Died: 14 February 1959 (aged 55); Camperdown, New South Wales, Australia
- Source: ESPNcricinfo, 23 December 2016

Selby Burt (12 December 1903 – 14 February 1959) was an Australian cricketer. He played two first-class matches for New South Wales between 1928/29 and 1929/30.

== See also ==
- List of New South Wales representative cricketers
