= James Burt (broker) =

James Burt (August 15, 1836 – July 7, 1892) was a 19th-century Wall Street broker from Albany, New York and a former assistant commissary general of the state of New York and assistant appraiser of the Port of New York. His brother, Colonel Silas W. Burt, was president of the Brokers' Loan and Investment Company and naval officer of the Port of New York under Presidents Rutherford B. Hayes and Grover Cleveland. Their father was Thomas M. Burt, a proprietor of the Albany Argus newspaper..

Burt attended Kinderhook, New York Academy and graduated from Union College in Schenectady, New York in 1854. Following his government appointments he was involved in the sugar business and was considered an expert regarding the commodity. At the time of his death he represented the Havemeyers in the sugar trust at their office at 56 Wall Street.

Burt was a prominent member of the Episcopal Church, attending the Church of St. Mary the Virgin on West 45th Street in New York City. He was treasurer of the church and also of the Church Club, of which he was one of the founders. His death of heart disease occurred suddenly at his home at 253 West 45th Street in 1892. He was married to Euretta Guion, the daughter of Covington Guion of Kinderhook. She survived him along with their three children.
