= George Crabb (writer) =

English writer (1778–1851)

George Crabb (1778–1851) was an English legal and miscellaneous writer.

== Life ==
He was born on 8 December 1778 at Palgrave, Suffolk. He was educated at a school at Diss and under a private tutor. He began as a medical student, but became assistant to a bookseller. This he also shortly dropped to study for the ministry at Northampton, but experienced a sudden change in his religious views.

In 1797 he came to London, and after his marriage to Maria Southgate, who subsequently edited ‘Tales for Children from the German,’ became classical master at Thorp Arch School, Yorkshire. To master German language he went in 1801 to Bremen, where he supported himself by teaching English.

In 1814 he entered Magdalen Hall, Oxford, as a gentleman commoner, and shortly thereafter published his oft reprinted Dictionary of English Synonymes. He graduated with a B.A. in 1821 and M.A. in 1822, with mathematical honours. He was called to the bar at the Inner Temple in 1829, and adopted the practice of conveyancer and chamber counsel, but on account of his shy manner was not very successful.

He became a recluse, and died on 4 December 1851.

== Works ==
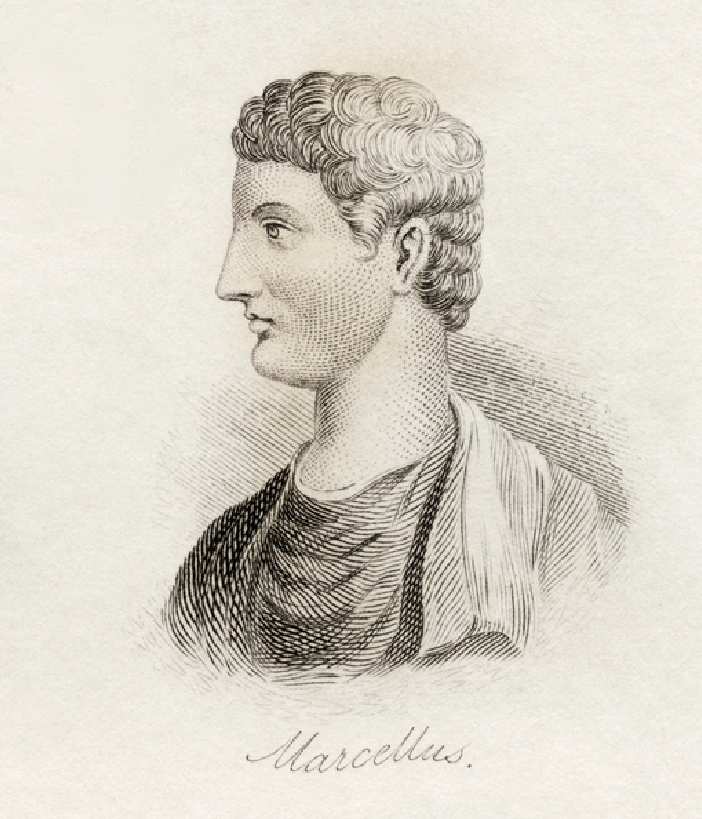
Marcus Claudius Marcellus in ''Universal Historical Dictionary

He published a German Grammar for Englishmen, Extracts from German Authors, and German and English Conversations, all popular instruction books which passed through many editions. He also wrote an English Grammar for Germans.

His main legal publications were:

- History of English Law, 1829, based on John Reeves's History of English Law
- Digest and Index of all the Statutes at Large, 4 volumes, 1841–7
- Law of Real Property, 2 volumes, 1846
- Series of Precedents in Conveyancing and Common and Commercial Forms,’ 3rd edition, 1845

He was also the author of dictionaries which obtained wide popularity, including

- Dictionary of English Synonymes, 1816
- Universal Technological Dictionary, 1823
- Universal Historical Dictionary
- Dictionary of General Knowledge
- New Pantheon or Mythology of all Nations
