= Burt's Brewery =

Former English brewery

Burt's Brewery (Burt & Co, and on occasions Burts Brewery), was an independent regional brewery owned by one family for much of its existence. It was founded in 1840 in Ventnor, Isle of Wight, England. Brewing ended at the Ventnor Brewery in 2009, however the Burt's name had not been used since 1998.

== History ==
Burt's Brewery
- Industry: Brewing
- Founded: 1840
- Founder: Charles Richard Cundell
- Defunct: 1998
- Headquarters: Ventnor, England
- Products: Beer

The brewery was probably founded in 1840 as the Ventnor Brewery although beer was being brewed on the site from the early 19th Century. It was located at what would become 119 High Street, Ventnor. The owner in 1844 was recorded as a Charles Richard Cundell.

In 1844 James Corbould, previously a schoolmaster from Berkshire, purchased the brewery.

The brewery used untreated spring water from the St Boniface Well in the chalk downs above Ventnor. In 1850 an agreement was made between Corbold and the Ventnor water company that this water be supplied to the brewery at a rental of sixpence per year for 1000 years. St Boniface was the logo for the company for most of its existence.

In 1866 a partnership of Fredrick Corbould and John Burt, a prominent member of the Ventnor business community, took over the brewery. The partnership was dissolved in 1868 and John Burt became the sole owner renaming it as Burt & Co.

In 1913 the business, together with a number of tied public houses, passed to William Arthur Phillips. The brewery remained in the Phillips family for several generations but retained the name Burt & Co.

On 17 January 1943, during the Second World War, two Luftwaffe Focke-Wulf Fw 190s conducted a tip and run raid on Ventnor. The brewery and neighbouring houses were bombed and the brewery was destroyed. Seven residents were killed including three members of the Phillips family. William Arthur Phillips, his son, Jack's wife and his daughter Pamela.

The brewery was rebuilt after the war and continued in operation under the Phillips family until 1992 when it closed. The site was purchased by a business consortium in 1995, trading as the Ventnor Brewery Ltd and they resumed brewing until 2009 when they ceased trading and the brewery closed permanently.

Meanwhile, in 1991 Hartridges Soft Drinks formed the Island Brewery on the Dodnor Industrial Estate in Newport. In 1993 they acquired the Burt's name and renamed it Burt's Brewery (Newport) Ltd. Brewing moved to the Sandown Brewery and Stillroom at 15 St Johns Road, Sandown in 1996. The brewery was brought by Ushers in March 1998 and brewing ceased soon afterwards.

== Beers ==
Burt's beers were noted for their low cost. They were usually only available on the Isle of Wight. Beers produced during the history of the brewery included the following:

=== Cask ales ===
- Ventnor Premium Ale (VPA). OG 1039 - 1040. Sometimes referred to as Ventnor Pale Ale. The most commonly available beer, often requested simply as 'a pint of Burts' or 'a pint of Veeps'. A hoppy, malty and inexpensive best bitter.
- 4X. OG 1040. Normally only produced in winter. A VPA with an addition of dark caramel.

=== Bottled ales ===
- Golden IPA. OG 1038.
- Nut Brown Ale. ABV 3.0%. A sweet low strength brown ale. Brewed from at least the 1930s to the closure of the original company in the 1990s.
- 4X Strong Brown Ale. OG 1038. ABV 3.8%.
- Old Berns Special Ale (later Berns Old Special Ale). OG 1048 - 1052. ABV 5.0%. A strong ale brewed for a short period in the late 1980s. Named after Bernie Jones an employee who joined them from Shanklin Brewery when that had ceased brewing in the early 1950s.
- Light Ale. OG 1030.
- Pale Ale. OG 1030.
- Ventnor Pale Ale.

== Public houses ==
During the Burt and Co. period (to 1992) the brewery owned the following public houses:

- Central Hotel. High Street, Ventnor. (closed)
- Central Tap. (later Hole in the Wall). Market Street, Ventnor. (closed and demolished)
- Terminus Hotel. Mitchell Avenue, Ventnor. (closed)
- Mill Bay Hotel. Esplanade, Ventnor.
- Volunteer Inn. Victoria Street, Ventnor.
- Walmer Castle Inn. West Street, Ventnor. (closed)
- Star Inn. Clarence Road, Wroxall.
- Chine Inn. Chine Avenue, Shanklin. (closed)
- Stag Inn. Sandown Road, Lake. (closed)
- Royal Standard Hotel. School Green, Freshwater (closed)
- Hare and Hounds. Arreton.

During the Burt's Brewery (Newport) Ltd period (from 1993 to 1998) the brewery acquired the following public houses renaming them in the style The Cask and … :

- The Taverners, High Street, Godshill, renamed The Cask and Taverners (as of 2021 reverted to The Taverners).
- The Stag, Cowes Road Newport, renamed The Cask and Custard Pot (as of 2021 reverted to The Stag).
- The Crispin, Carisbrooke Road, Newport, renamed The Cask and Crispin (as of 2021 reverted to The Crispin).
- The Commercial, St Johns Road, Sandown, renamed The Cask and Codpiece, later renamed again The Sandown Brewery and Stillroom and the Old Comical (as of 2021 The Old Comical).
- The Railway, St Johns Road Ryde, renamed The Cask and Cucumber, later renamed again The Hole in the Wall (as of 2021 The Railway Inn).

== In popular culture ==
Episode 4 of the 2021 television drama serial It's a Sin is set in 1988. During the episode the character Ritchie Tozer returns to his parental home on the Isle of Wight. When visiting a local pub he orders a pint of Burts.
