= Bobby Burt =

Australian rules footballer

Personal information
- Full name: Robert Roy Burt
- Born: 23 May 1934
- Died: 29 September 2017 (aged 83)
- Original team: Melbourne Scouts
- Height: 175 cm (5 ft 9 in)
- Weight: 76 kg (168 lb)

Playing career^{1}
Years	Club	Games (Goals)
1955–57	North Melbourne	11 (2)
- ^{1} Playing statistics correct to the end of 1957.

Robert Roy Burt (23 May 1934 – 29 September 2017) was an Australian rules footballer who played with North Melbourne in the Victorian Football League (VFL).
