= Syd Burt =

Australian rules footballer

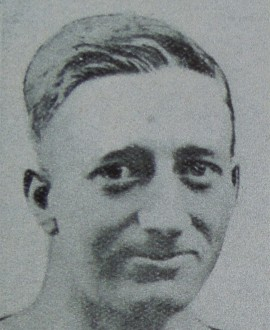

Personal information
- Full name: William Sydney Burt
- Born: 25 July 1896; Tally Ho, Victoria
- Died: 1 May 1969 (aged 72); Heidelberg, Victoria
- Original team: Ivanhoe
- Height: 171 cm (5 ft 7 in)
- Weight: 72 kg (159 lb)

Playing career^{1}
Years	Club	Games (Goals)
1924–25	Collingwood	10 (1)
- ^{1} Playing statistics correct to the end of 1925.

William Sydney Burt (25 July 1896 – 1 May 1969) was an Australian rules footballer who played with Collingwood in the Victorian Football League (VFL).
