= Richard Burt (disambiguation) =

Richard Burt commonly refers to Richard R. Burt (born 1947), American businessman and diplomat

Richard Burt may also refer to:

- Richard Burt (politician) (1909–1993), Australian businessman and politician
- Richard Burt (skier), British Paralympic skier
