= Eva König =

German writer (1736–1778)

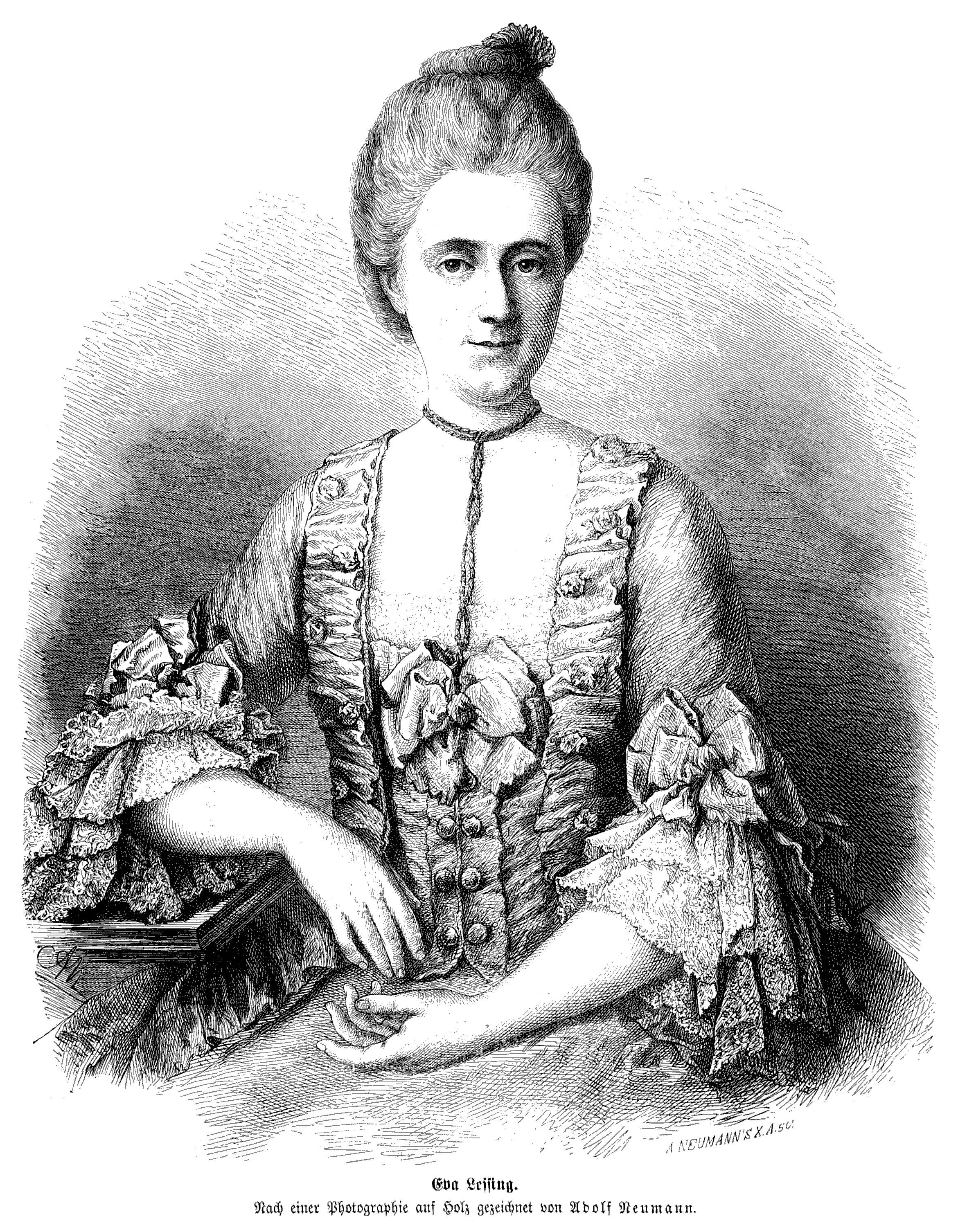
- Born: Eva Catharina Hahn; 22 March 1736; Heidelberg
- Died: 10 January 1778 (aged 41); Wolfenbüttel
- Burial place: Bürgerfriedhof behind the Trinitatiskirche
- Spouse(s): Engelbert König; Gotthold Ephraim Lessing

Eva Catharina König (née Hahn; 22 March 1736 – 10 January 1778) was a German woman letter writer.

== Life ==
Eva Hahn was born in 1736 in Heidelberg. She was one of six children born to Eva and Heinrich Hahn.

In 1756, she married the Hamburg businessman Engelbert König. The couple had four children: Maria Amalie Henneberg, Theodor, Engelbert, and Fritz.

In 1767, she became friends with the playwright Gotthold Ephraim Lessing, who became godfather to her son Fritz. When her husband died in 1769, Lessing took a special interest in the family. Eva and Lessing became engaged in 1771 and they were married in 1776 in Jork near Hamburg.

During their engagement, Eva made several visits to Vienna to settle her late husband's estate. She also chaperoned the young Prince Leopold of Brunswick-Wolfenbüttel on some of his travels. As a result, the couple's mode of contact during their engagement was through written correspondence, most of which has survived.

After their marriage, the Lessings moved to Wolfenbüttel. Eva died in 1778 at the age of 41 of neonatal sepsis soon after the birth of their son Traugott Lessing. She was buried at Bürger Friedhof hinter der Trinitatiskirche, in Wolfenbüttel, Landkreis Wolfenbüttel, Lower Saxony (Niedersachsen), Germany.
