= Silas W. Burt =

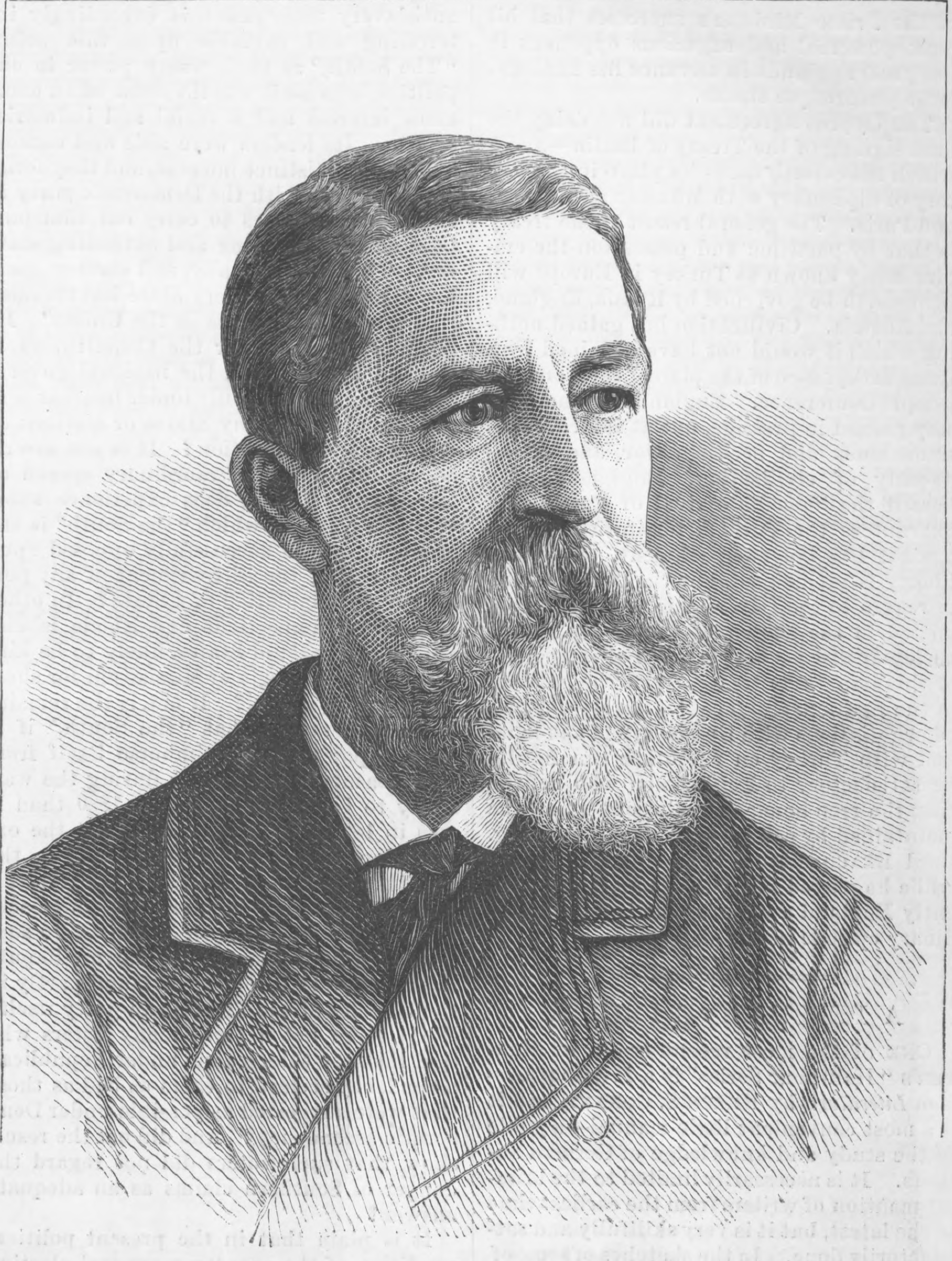
- Born: 5 April 1830
- Died: 30 November 1912 (aged 82)

Silas Wright Burt (April 5, 1830 – November 30, 1912) was a civil service reformer and naval officer of the port of New York.

Burt was born in Albany, New York, the son of Thomas Burt and Lydia (Butts) Burt in 1830. In 1855, he married Jeanette Ferrell of Logansport, Indiana. President Rutherford B. Hayes appointed him Naval Officer of the Port of New York in 1878 as a part of his efforts to reform the civil service structure there. After his term expired in 1883, President Chester A. Arthur appointed Burt to be Chief Examiner of the Civil Service System for the state of New York. President Grover Cleveland reappointed him Naval Officer in 1885. He later served as Civil Service Commissioner of New York from 1895 to 1900.

His brother, James Burt, was also a customs official in New York as well as a banker.

== Sources ==
"Silas W. Burt Dead at 83" (PDF). New York Times. December 1, 1912.

Burt, Henry Martyn & Burt, Silas Wright (October 1893). Early Days in New England: Life and Times of Henry Burt of Springfield and Some of His Descendants. Springfield, Mass.: Clark W. Bryan Company.
