= Nathaniel Burt =

American classical composer

Nathaniel Burt in 1947

Nathaniel Burt (November 21, 1913, Jackson Hole, Wyoming – July 1, 2003, Princeton, New Jersey) was an American composer, teacher, poet, novelist and social historian. A lecturer at Princeton University and Westminster Choir College, he is best remembered for his 1963 New York Times bestseller, The Perennial Philadelphians.

== Life and career ==
He was the son of writers Struthers Burt and Katharine Newlin Burt. His father grew up in Philadelphia, the son of a prominent lawyer, and was a graduate of Princeton and Oxford University. A published poet and novelist, Struthers became a Wyoming rancher. Burt's mother wrote Western novels and short stories, several of which were adapted into screenplays for early films. They operated the Bar B C Dude Ranch, outside Jackson Hole, Wyoming, where Nathaniel was born in 1913. He had a younger sister, Julia Burt Atteberry (1915–1986). Among their Wyoming neighbors was novelist (and Philadelphian) Owen Wister, who owned a nearby ranch.

Burt's parents lived in Southern Pines, North Carolina during the winters, where he attended elementary school. He was sent to boarding school at The Saint James School in Hagerstown, Maryland, and graduated as valedictorian of his class in 1931. He attended Princeton University for a year, before dropping out and teaching in the Hoboken, New Jersey public schools. He completed an undergraduate degree at New York University's Mannes School of Music in 1939, and returned to Princeton to teach music theory in the Department of Music, 1939–1941. He joined the U.S. Navy in 1942, spent World War II in the Pacific theatre, and was discharged in 1945 as a lieutenant.

He returned to Princeton after the war, and completed a Master of Fine Arts degree in music in 1949. His compositions included ballet, choral, orchestral, and piano music. He taught simultaneously at Princeton and Westminster Choir College, and was co-founder of the Princeton Chamber Orchestra.

Burt completed two books of poetry: Rooms in a House (1947) and Questions on a Kite (1950). He gave up teaching in 1952 to concentrate full time on writing. His first novel, Scotland's Burning (1954), was set at a boys boarding school, similar to the one he had attended. He wrote scholarly articles analyzing the development of drama in the libretti of early Italian operas.

=== The Perennial Philadelphians ===
[Burt's] left eye is keen, jaded, and aware of the ridiculous; his right eye is filled with Brotherly Love.
— David H. Blair Jr. (in his 1964 review of The Perennial Philadelphians)

Burt spent six years researching and writing The Perennial Philadelphians, a 625-page social history of the city's upper class from the 17th century to the 20th. Having grown up in Wyoming, North Carolina and Maryland, he was considered an outsider, "but Mr. Burt's roots led back to an old Philadelphia family much like those he chronicled." With "biting social commentary," he traced how the great fortunes had been made (and preserved, or squandered), in "a genteel society of inherited wealth that views ambition as vulgar and not very nice." Burt wittily deciphered Old Philadelphia for the general reader:

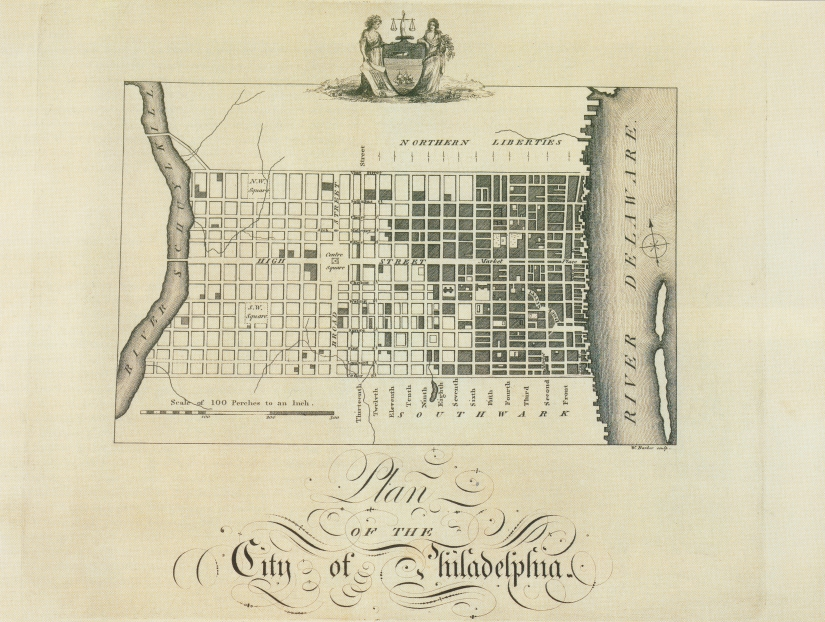
William Birch, Plan of the City of Philadelphia (1800)

Philadelphians are house snobs in more ways than one; in the old days when Everybody lived in town, at least in winter, not only how one lived, but where, could mean the difference between social life and death. Market Street was the "tracks" and if you lived "North of Market" you were on the wrong side of them! "Nobody lived there."

The right side of the tracks, the only area of the city that Old Philadelphia considered really Philadelphia, is that narrow belt that extends from the Delaware to the Schuylkill south of Market and north of Lombard. The rhyme "Chestnut, Walnut, Spruce and Pine; Market, Arch, Race and Vine" expressed the ultimate limits, north and south, of an Old Philadelphian's personal knowledge of the city — and Race and Vine Streets were only included because of the rhyme.

It is not that they don't know that this Greater Philadelphia exists; in fact many of them, particularly historically-minded older gentlemen, have a sort of a benevolent curiosity about it, the feeling a birdwatcher has for some particularly busy bog; they know about the people that live there, but they don't and won't actually know the odd specimens inhabiting this swamp that surrounds the walled bastion, the Inner, the Forbidden City, of real Philadelphia, their own narrow historical, hereditary waistband.

The Perennial Philadelphians received a highly favorable review in the New York Times Book Review, and made the New York Times bestseller list. Burt later wrote: "My best known book, like my father's has been a book about Philadelphia — precisely that Philadelphia from which my father and [Owen] Wister escaped to go West. Since I have never actually lived in Philadelphia, it has had something of the exotic glamour for me that Wyoming had for Wister."

=== Personal ===
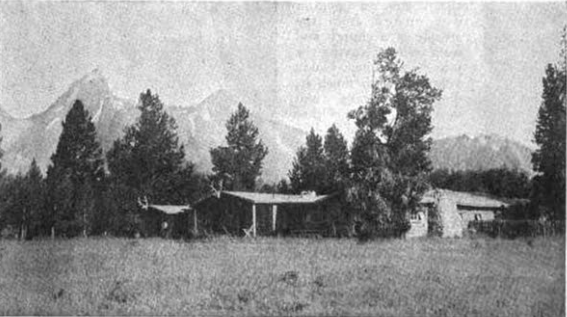
Burt house, Bar B C Ranch, Moose, Wyoming, 1921

Bar B C Ranch survey by HABS, 1980

Burt served on the board of directors of the Athenaeum of Philadelphia for many years, and was elected a Life Fellow. He was also a member of Philadelphia's Rittenhouse Club (defunct). He served on the Board of Directors of The Historical Society of Princeton, and contributed to its scholarly journal, Princeton History. He was a member of the Princeton Club of New York, and the Century Association.

He married Margaret "Winkie" Clinton (1917–2013), of Barnstable, Massachusetts, on August 5, 1941. The couple had two children, and lived in Princeton for more than 50 years. They attended Trinity Episcopal Church—where he sang in the choir and she was a member of the altar guild—and he was co-author of a 1982 history of the church. They were married for 62 years, until his death in 2003. Their son, Christopher C. Burt, is a writer and publisher, and author of Extreme Weather: A Guide and Record Book (New York: W. W. Norton & Co., 2004).

Nathaniel and Margaret Burt are buried with his parents and sister at Aspen Hill Cemetery, Jackson Hole, Wyoming.

Burt's papers are at Princeton University, including the diaries he kept for 70 years. He left his musical compositions and music library to Westminster Choir College, now part of Rider University.

== List of works ==
=== Musical compositions ===
- Fruits of Solitude
- The Elegy of Lycidas
- Sets for Piano
- Margery's Garland
- 3 Madrigals
- Athenaeum of Philadelphia Waltz (1964)

=== Poetry collections ===
- Rooms in a House – And Other Poems, 1931–1944 (New York: Charles Scribner's Sons, 1947)
- Questions on a Kite (New York: Charles Scribner's Sons, 1950)

=== Novels ===
- Scotland's Burning (1954)
- Make My Bed (1957)
- Leopards in the Garden (1968)

=== Non-fiction ===
==== Music ====
- "Opera in Arcadia," The Musical Quarterly, vol. 41, no. 2 (April 1955), pp. 145–170. "Scholarship in English on the Arcadian Academy and [Arcadian] opera in general, and on Crescimbeni in particular, began with Nathaniel Burt's seminal article, 'Opera in Arcadia,' published in the Musical Quarterly in 1955."
- "Plus ca change, or, The Progress of Reform in Seventeenth- and Eighteenth-Century Opera as Illustrated in the Books of Three Operas," Studies in Music History, Harold Powers, ed. (Princeton University Press, 1958).

==== Philadelphia ====
- The Bonapartes in America (The Athenaeum of Philadelphia, 1960)
- The Perennial Philadelphians: The Anatomy of an American Aristocracy (1963, reprint 1999)
- (with Wallace E. Davies), "The Iron Age, 1876-1905," Philadelphia: A Three Hundred Year History, Russell Weigley, ed. (New York: W. W. Norton & Co., 1981)

==== Princeton ====
- "Student Life at Nassau Hall," Nassau Hall 1756–1956, Henry Lyttleton Savage, ed. (Princeton University Press, 1956)
- "Struthers Burt '04: The Literary Career of a Princetonian," The Princeton University Library Chronicle, vol. 19, no. 3/4 (Spring-Summer 1958)
- "Browsing The New Jersey Historical Series," The Literary Heritage of New Jersey, Volume 20, Laurence B. Holland, ed. (Princeton: D. Van Nostrand Company, 1964)
- "The Princeton Novel," The Princeton University Library Chronicle, Spring 1979
- (with Margery P. Cuyler), A Short History of Trinity Church, Princeton, New Jersey (1982)
- "The Princeton Grandees," Princeton History, no. 3 (The Historical Society of Princeton, 1982)
- "An Exile in Princeton: The Letters of Charles Thomson," The Princeton University Library Chronicle, 1983
- "Henry van Dyke: Poet of Genteel Princeton," Princeton History, no. 7 (The Historical Society of Princeton, 1988)

==== Wyoming ====
- War Cry of the West: The Story of the Powder River (1964). From the dust jacket: "Based on Struthers Burt's adult book, Powder River (1938), this lively volume by his son offers a true picture of the region where young imaginations have always loved to roam."
- Jackson Hole Journal (University of Oklahoma Press, 1983). Burt's recollections of seventy summers spent in Wyoming.
- Compass American Guide: Wyoming (1991). Published by Christopher C. Burt.

==== Cultural history ====
- First Families: The Making of an American Aristocracy (Boston: Little, Brown & Company, 1970). A group portrait of five prominent American families: the Adamses of Massachusetts, the Biddles of Philadelphia, the du Ponts of Delaware, the Lees of Virginia, and the Roosevelts of New York.
- Palaces for the People: A Social History of the American Art Museum (Boston: Little, Brown & Company, 1977). A chronicle of how the collections of American art museums were built.
