= James Burt (cricketer) =

English cricketer

James Burt (28 October 1792 – 4 September 1858) was an English amateur cricketer who played from 1825 to 1832. He was mainly associated with Hampshire and Marylebone Cricket Club (MCC), of which he was a member. He made 13 known appearances in important matches, including 3 for The Bs from 1828 to 1832.

== Bibliography ==
- Haygarth, Arthur (1996) [1862]. Scores & Biographies, Volume 1 (1744–1826). Kennington: Frederick Lillywhite. ISBN 978-19-00592-23-9.
- Haygarth, Arthur (1997) [1862]. Scores & Biographies, Volume 2 (1827–1840). Kennington: Frederick Lillywhite. ISBN 978-19-00592-23-9.
