= George Burt =

George Burt may refer to:

- George Burt (Canada) (1903–1988), Canadian director of the United Auto Workers and political candidate
- George Burt (Britain) (1816–1894), British public-works contractor and businessman
- George Burt (fencer) (1884–1964), British Olympic fencer
- George Burt (cricketer) (1886–1935), Scottish cricketer
