= Joan Burt =

Canadian architect and educator (1930–2021)

- Born: Joan Burt; 1930; Toronto, Ontario, Canada
- Died: 10 March 2021
- Education: University of Toronto, 1951-56 (BA Architectural Studies)
- Occupation: Architect
- Known for: Victorian row homes
- Notable work: Luella Booth Residence, Toronto, Ontario (1961); Daymond House, Guelph, Ontario (1991); O'Reilly Residence, Etobicoke, Ontario (1999)

Joan Burt (1930 - 10 March 2021) was a Canadian architect and educator.

She was born in Toronto and received a BArch from the University of Toronto in 1956, becoming the 21st woman to graduate from the program. Burt worked with architecture firm Mathers and Haldenby from 1956 to 1958 and with developer Irwin Burns from 1958 to 1959 before establishing her own firm in 1958. Since the 1960s, she has been involved in renovating 19th century rowhouses in downtown Toronto. New home projects include the Luella Booth Residence in Toronto, the Daymond House in Guelph and the O'Reilly Residence in Etobicoke. She was a member of the Ontario Association of Architects and the Canadian Association of Heritage Professionals.

From 1964 to 1970, she operated an antique store specializing in furniture and artifacts.

Burt also taught environmental design part-time at the Ontario College of Art, later OCAD, from 1965 to 1970 and was chair for the department of design from 1970 to 1985. A Joan Burt Architect Award was awarded to an environmental design student at OCAD between 2008 and 2023.
