= Edwin C. Burt =

Edwin C. Burt (July 1818 – May 23, 1884) was the owner of Edwin C. Burt & Co., a manufacturer of shoes, and director of the Hanover Insurance Company.

== Early life ==
Burt was born in New Boston, Massachusetts in 1818. His father was in the leather business, and moved the family to Hartford, Connecticut in 1825 to work there.

== Edwin C. Burt & Co. ==
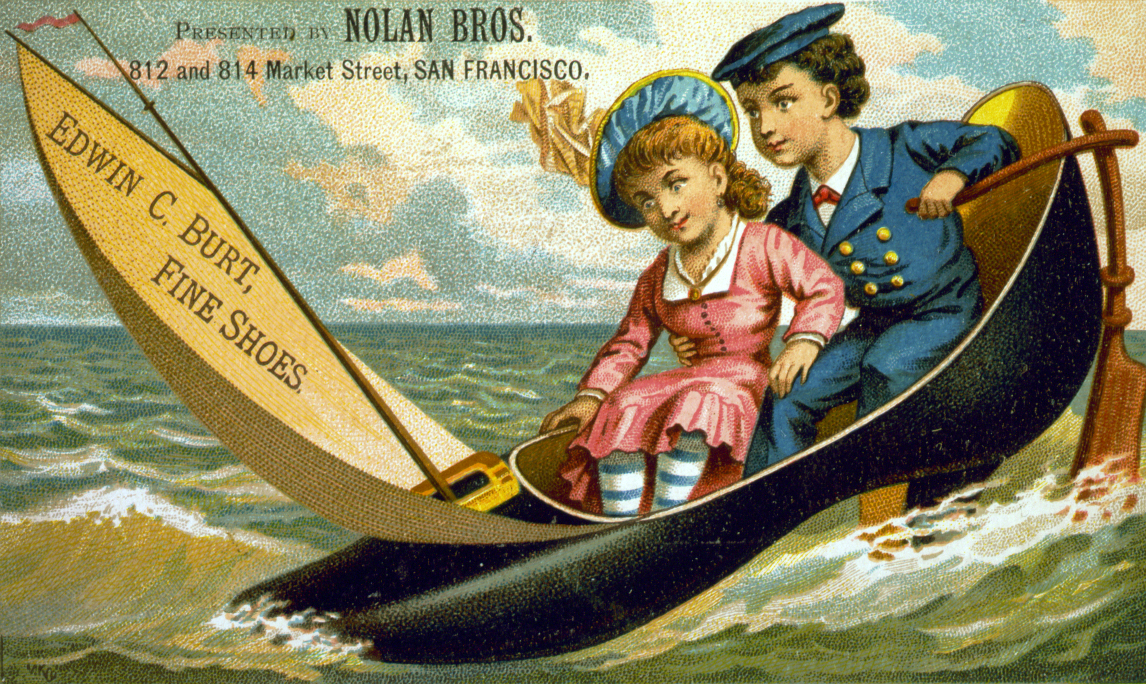
An 1881 advertisement for Edwin C. Burt & Co.

In 1838, Burt began to produce boots and shoes with his father in Hartford. The business moved to New York City in 1848 as the market in Hartford was too small. At this time Burt's brother, James, began working with him. The firm was officially founded in 1860, and primarily dealt with markets in the Southern United States. When the Civil War began in 1861, this business was effectively gone. Subsequently, the company began producing women's and children's shoes. In 1874, Burt patented an improvement he made to shoes. The patent described a new method of producing shoes that provides increased durability. The patent number was 146801 and was filed November 24, 1873. Burt's shoe company was especially known for its advertisements. A series of trade cards were produced in the 1880s for the company advertising their shoes. One such trade card featured children sitting in an oversized shoe, shaped like a sailboat, with the caption "Edwin C. Burt, Fine Shoes". The trade cards also came with a warning to customers to check for stamps in his shoes, to ensure that they were genuine products. On August 10, 1898, the company assigned its liabilities over to a Thomas Cunningham of Blauvelt, New York, estimated at $60,000.

== Death ==
In 1884, Burt struggled with Bright's disease for five weeks before succumbing. He died on May 23, 1884, in his home in Orange, New Jersey.
