= Burt, North Dakota =

Coordinates: 46°21′55″N 102°09′19″W

- Town
- Interactive map of Burt, North Dakota
- Country: United States
- State: North Dakota
- County: Hettinger
- Time zone: MST

Burt is an unincorporated community in Hettinger County, in the U.S. state of North Dakota.

== History ==
The name was originally Alton, but changed to Burt to avoid any confusion. A post office called Burt was established in 1910, and remained in operation until 1975. The community was named for A. M. Burt, a railroad official. The population was 125 in 1940.
