= Maxwell Struthers Burt =

American poet

- Born: October 18, 1882; Baltimore, Maryland, U.S.
- Died: August 29, 1954 (aged 71); Jackson Hole, Wyoming, U.S.
- Occupations: Writer, poet

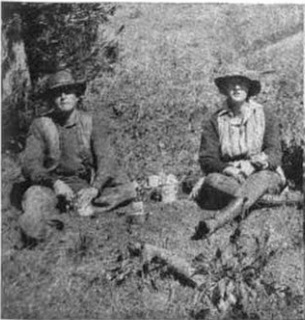
Struthers and Katharine Newlin Burt in Wyoming, 1921

Maxwell Struthers Burt (October 18, 1882 Baltimore, Maryland – August 29, 1954, Jackson Hole, Wyoming), was an American novelist, poet, and short-story writer.

== Life ==
Struthers Burt grew up in Philadelphia, where he attended private schools and worked at a city newspaper. He graduated from Princeton University in 1904, then attended the Ludwig-Maximilians-Universität München, and Merton College at the University of Oxford. Following his return to the United States, he taught English at Princeton.

In 1908, he moved to Wyoming and co-founded the JY Ranch with Louis Joy, which would later become the famous Rockefeller ranch of the same name. In 1912, following a dispute with Joy, he established his own dude ranch, the Bar B C Ranch. That same year, he met and married his wife, Katharine Newlin Burt, an author of Western novels. They had two children: Nathaniel Burt (1913–2003) and Julia Bleecker Burt Atteberry (1915–1986).

Burt served in the U.S. Army Air Service Signal Corps during World War I. After the war, he and his family began wintering in North Carolina.

Burt helped in the establishment of Grand Teton National Park when, in 1923, he met with other like-minded individuals at Maud Noble's cabin and began the process of gathering support to have the area come under protection by the Federal Government. He was also a fierce supporter of the Jackson Hole National Monument before it eventually formed the larger Grand Teton National Park.

The premise of Burt's fifth novel, Along these Streets, is a Westerner who inherits a large Philadelphia fortune, with the stipulation that he must move East and live in the city. Felix Bartain Macalister experiences the city's cultural traditions, and encounters various characters who attempt to guide or exploit him. Compared with contemporaneous novels, sociologist E. Digby Baltzell found it "… a far more sensitive portrait of Proper Philadelphia." This portrait, however, is painted in opposition to Proper Philadelphia's conservatism, which the main character readily acknowledges: "… I think I'm what might be called a radical liberal, but I'm for evolution, not revolution." At the end of the novel, Felix escapes and finds himself on horseback in ... Wyoming.

Burt's papers are housed at Princeton University and the University of Wyoming's American Heritage Center.

His son Nathaniel was also a published author, as is his grandson, Christopher C. Burt (b. 1954).

Nathaniel Burt wrote of his late father's novels: "There is always a love story, there is always a certain strict plotting of acceptance, withdrawal, misunderstanding, and final clinch that leads to much amusing discussion of the difference between men and women, but which does not escape a sort of artificiality."

== Bibliography ==
=== Novels ===
- The Interpreter’s House (Charles Scribner's Sons, New York, 1924)
- The Delectable Mountains (Charles Scribner's Sons, New York, 1927)
- Festival (Charles Scribner's Sons, New York, 1931)
- Entertaining the Islanders (Charles Scribner's Sons, New York, 1933)
- Along These Streets (Charles Scribner's Sons, New York, 1942)

=== Short fiction ===
Collections

- John O'May and Other Stories (1918)
- Chance Encounters (1921)
- They Could Not Sleep (1928)

=== Poetry ===
Collections

- In The High Hills (Houghton Mifflin, Boston, 1914)
- Songs and Portraits (1920)
- When I Grew Up to Middle Age (Charles Scribner's Sons, New York, 1925)
- War Songs (Charles Scribner's Sons, New York, 1942)

=== Plays ===
- The Mullah of Miasmia (1903)

=== Non-fiction ===
- The Diary of a Dude Wrangler (Charles Scribner's Sons, New York, 1924)
- The Other Side' (Charles Scribner's Sons, New York, 1928)
- Malice in Blunderland (1935)
- Escape from America (Charles Scribner's Sons, New York, 1936)
- Powder River: Let 'er Buck (Farrar & Rinehart, New York,1938) part of the Rivers of America Series
- Patriotism Versus Prejudice: Hitler Forces at Work in America (American Jewish Committee, 1939)
- Philadelphia Holy Experiment (Doubleday, Doran, & Co., New York, 1945)
- The History of Cap and Gown: 1890-1950 (Princeton University Press, 1951)
