= Psychosexual disorder =

- Specialty: Psychiatry

Psychosexual disorder is a sexual problem that is psychological, rather than physiological in origin. "Psychosexual disorder" was a term used in Freudian psychology. The term "psychosexual disorder" (Turkish: Psikoseksüel bozukluk) has been used by the TAF for homosexuality as a reason to ban the LGBT people from military service.

== Paraphilias ==
Paraphilias are generally defined as psychosexual disorders in which significant distress or an impairment in a domain of functioning results from recurrent intense sexual urges, fantasies or behaviors generally involving an unusual object, activity, or situation. An alternative definition is given by the DSM-5 which labels them as sexual; attractions to objects, situations or people that deviate from the desires and sexual behaviors that are considered to be socially acceptable. Examples of these paraphilias would include fetishism, sexual masochism and sadism and more.

=== Fetishism and transvestic fetishism ===
Fetishism is a disorder that is characterized by a sexual fixation, fantasies or behaviors toward an inanimate object, these objects frequently are articles of clothing. It is only through this object which the individual can achieve sexual gratification. It is not rare that an individual will rub or smell the object. This disorder is more common in males and it is not understood why.

Transvestic fetishism also commonly known as transvestism, is a diagnoses found in the DSM. There are four factors that revolve around this syndrome. These include cross-dressing, being associated with sexual arousal, in a biological male, and the person has to be a heterosexual male.

=== Sexual sadism and sexual masochism ===
The disorders known as sexual sadism and sexual masochism are oftentimes confused or hard to separate when their definitions are compared but diagnostic criteria differ slightly between the two and allows for more easy classification. Sexual sadism disorder and sexual masochism are defined as receiving sexual arousal from the humiliation, pain and or suffering of an individual and are thought to overlap with multiple other conditions due to its description along with diagnostic criteria.

=== Voyeurism, exhibitionism and frotteurism ===
Voyeurism is self-reported sexual arousal from spying on others or the observation of others who are engaged in sexual interaction.

Exhibitionism are public acts of exposing parts of one's body that are not socially acceptable to be exposed. Exhibitionistic acts are among the most common of the potentially law-breaking sexual behaviors. Examples of this would include "streaking" during a professional sporting event or protesting a political event in the nude.

Frotteurism is considered a rare paraphilia that revolves around an individual's sexual satisfaction being derived from rubbing upon another non-consenting individual. The term frotteurism itself can be broken down and derived from the French verb frotter which means rubbing.

== Diagnosis ==
In the DSM-5 all paraphilia disorders can be diagnosed by two main criteria that are referred to criteria A and criteria B respectively. The A and B criteria include a duration in which the behavior must be present for (typically six months) and specific details of actions or thoughts that are correlated specifically with the respective disorder being diagnosed.

== Treatment ==
Psychosexual disorders can vary greatly in severity and treatability. Medical professionals and licensed therapists are necessary in diagnosis and treatment plans. Treatment can vary from therapy to prescription medication. Sex therapy, behavioral therapy, and group therapy may be helpful to those distressed by sexual dysfunction. More serious sexual disorders may be treated with androgen blockers or selective serotonin reuptake inhibitors (SSRIs) to help restore hormonal and neurochemical balances.

== History ==
=== Sigmund Freud ===
Sigmund Freud has contributed to the idea of psychosexual disorders and furthered research of the topic through his ideas of psychosexual development and his psychoanalytic sex drive theory. According to Freud's ideas of psychosexual development, as a child, one will progress through five stages of development. These stages being the oral stage (1 -1 1/2 yrs), the anal stage(1 1/2- 3yrs) phallic stage (3-5 yrs), the latency stage (5-12 yrs) and the genital stage (from puberty on). A psychosexual disorder could arise in an individual if the individual does not progress through these stages properly. Proper progression through these stages requires the correct amounts of stimulation and gratification at each stage. If there is too little stimulation at a certain stage fixation occurs and becoming overly fixated could lead to a psychosexual disorder. In contrast, too much stimulation at a certain stage of development could lead to regression when that individual is in distress, also possibly leading to a psychosexual disorder.

=== Richard Freiherr von Kraft-Ebing ===
Richard Krafft-Ebing was a German psychiatrist who sought to revolutionize sexuality in the late nineteenth century. Working in a time of sexual modesty, Krafft-Ebing brought light to sexuality as an innate human nature verses deviancy. His most notable work, Psychopathia Sexualis, was a collection of case studies highlighting sexual practices of the general public. The textbook was the first of its kind recognizing the variation within human sexuality, such as: nymphomania, fetishism, and homosexuality. Psychiatrists were now able to diagnose psychosexual disorders in place of perversions. Psychopathia Sexualis was used as reference in psychological, medical, and judicial settings. Krafft-Ebing is considered the founder of medical sexology; he is the predecessor of both Sigmund Freud and Havelock Ellis.

=== Havelock Ellis ===
Havelock Ellis was an English physician and writer born in the eighteen hundreds who studied human sexuality, and is referred to as one of the earliest sexologists. Ellis's work was geared towards human sexual behavior. His major work was a seven-volume publication called Studies in the Psychology of Sex, which related sex to society. Published in 1921, Studies in the Psychology of Sex covered the evolution of modesty, sexual periodicity, auto-erotism, sexual inversion, sexual impulse, sexual selection, and erotic symbolism. Ellis also conceived the term eonism, which references a man dressing as a woman. He elaborated on this term in his publication of Eonism and Other Supplementary Studies. He wrote Sexual Inversion as well in hopes to address any ignorance people have on the topic.

== See also ==
- LGBT rights in Turkey
- Psychoanalysis
- Sigmund Freud
- Psychosexual development
