= Katharine Newlin Burt =

American novelist and film scenarist (b. 1882, d. 1977)

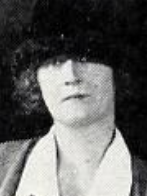
- Born: September 6, 1882; Fishkill Landing, New York, US
- Died: June 1977 (aged 94); Princeton, New Jersey, US
- Occupation(s): Novelist and silent film scenarist
- Years active: 1912–1975
- Spouse: Maxwell Struthers Burt (m. 1912–1954)
- Children: 2

Katharine Newlin Burt (September 6, 1882 – June 1977) was an American novelist and film scenarist. She was a prolific author of Westerns and other novels, with a publishing career that spanned more than 60 years. At least seven of Burt's published works were adapted to film, and she authored the original screen stories for two more films.

== Life ==
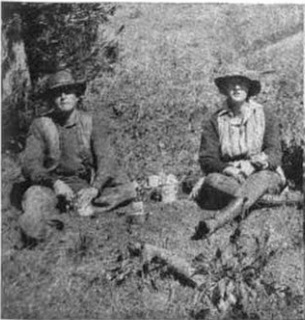
Katharine Newlin Burt (right) and her husband, Maxwell Struthers Burt

Katharine Newlin was born to Thomas Shipley Newlin and Julia Maria (Onderdonk) Newlin on September 6, 1882, in Fishkill Landing, New York. Newlin began writing short stories while in kindergarten in Munich.

Newlin married writer Maxwell Struthers Burt in 1912, adding his last name to her own. The couple had one son, Nathaniel Burt (who went on to be a writer) and one daughter, Julia. The Burts lived four months of the year in the eastern U.S., but spent the rest of the time at their "real home," the Bar B C Dude Ranch, a thousand-acre cattle ranch at the foot of the Tetons in Jackson Hole, Wyoming.

Katharine Newlin Burt died in June 1977 in Princeton, New Jersey.

== Critical legacy ==
Norris Wilson Yates notes that Burt wrote both formula and non-formula Westerns, and argues that she "excels in evoking Western landscape as a force in the lives and feelings of her characters." Victoria Lamont writes that Burt's The Branding Iron participates in a "radical, though still deeply problematic, feminism," attention to which should change the way we think about "the importance of western mythology in women's literary history." The Branding Iron, along with two other women's Westerns, "participate in a shift in Anglo-American feminist discourse as American feminism decoupled from the abolition movement and became racially divided."

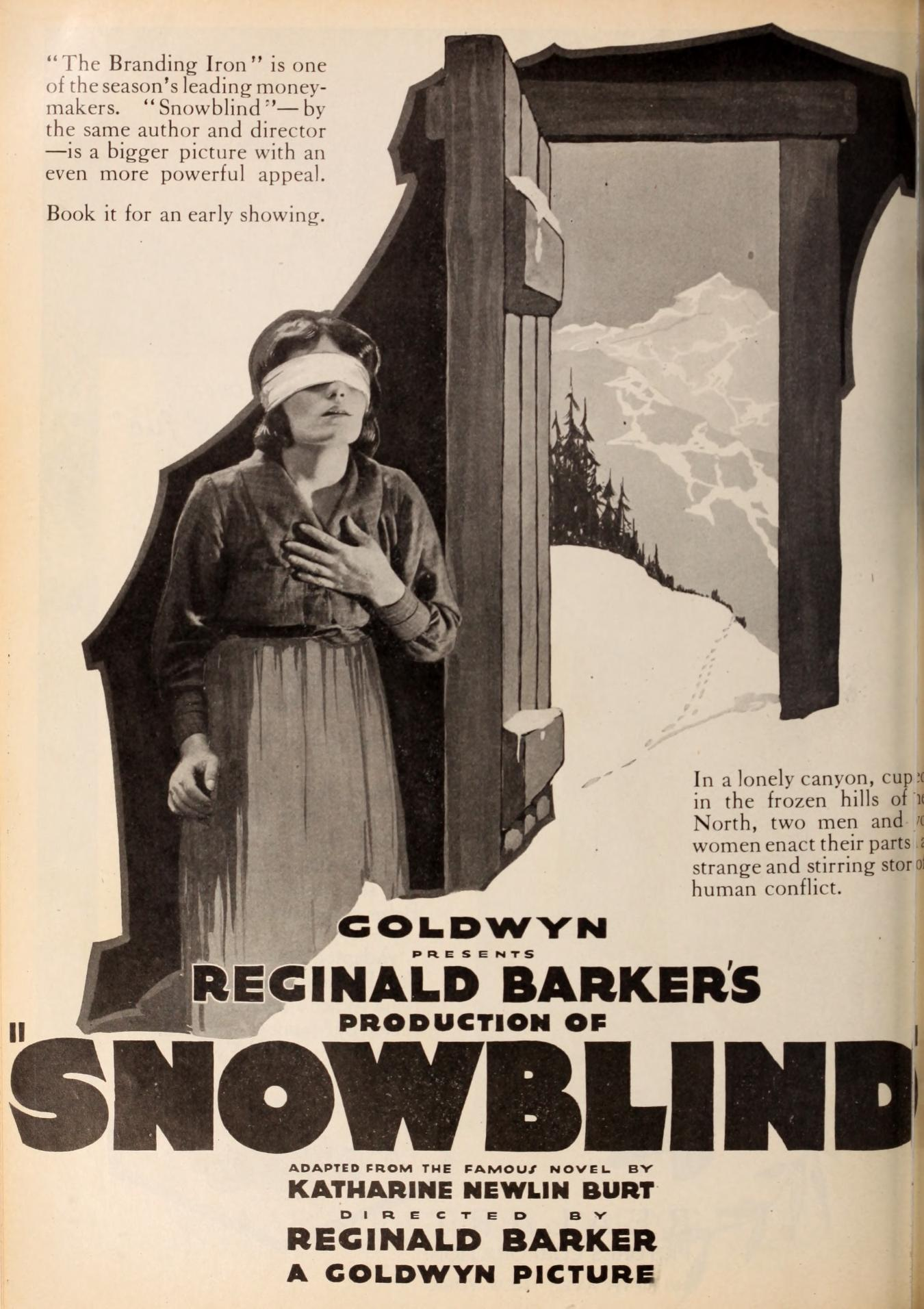
A 1921 magazine advertisement for Snowblind, highlighting Katharine Newlin Burt's status as author of the source material

== Novels ==
- Penelope Intrudes (Cassell, Limited, 1912)
- The Branding Iron (Grosset and Dunlap, 1919)
- Hidden Creek (Houghton Mifflin, 1920)
- The Red Lady (Houghton Mifflin, 1920)
- Snowblind (Houghton Mifflin, 1921)
- "Q" (Houghton Mifflin, 1922)
- Quest (Houghton, 1925)
- The Summons
- The Grey Parrot (1926)
- Cock's Feathers (Houghton Mifflin, 1928)
- A Man's Own Country (Houghton Mifflin, 1931)
- The Tall Ladder (1932)
- Beggars All (Houghton Mifflin, 1933)
- This Woman and This Man (Scribners, 1934)
- When Beggars Choose (1937)
- The Safe Road (1938)
- Men of Moon Mountain (Macrae Smith, 1938)
- If Love I Must (Macrae Smith, 1939)
- Captain Millet's Island (Macrae Smith, 1944)
- Close Pursuit (Scribners, 1947)
- Lady in the Tower (Dell, 1947)
- Still Water (1948)
- Strong Citadel (Scribners, 1949)
- Escape from Paradise (1952)
- Scotland's Burning (1953)
- Smarty (Funk & Wagnalls, 1965)
- One Silver Spur (Funk & Wagnalls, 1968)
- Lost Isobel (Signet, 1968)
- Ree (Signet, 1973)
- A Very Tender Love (1975)

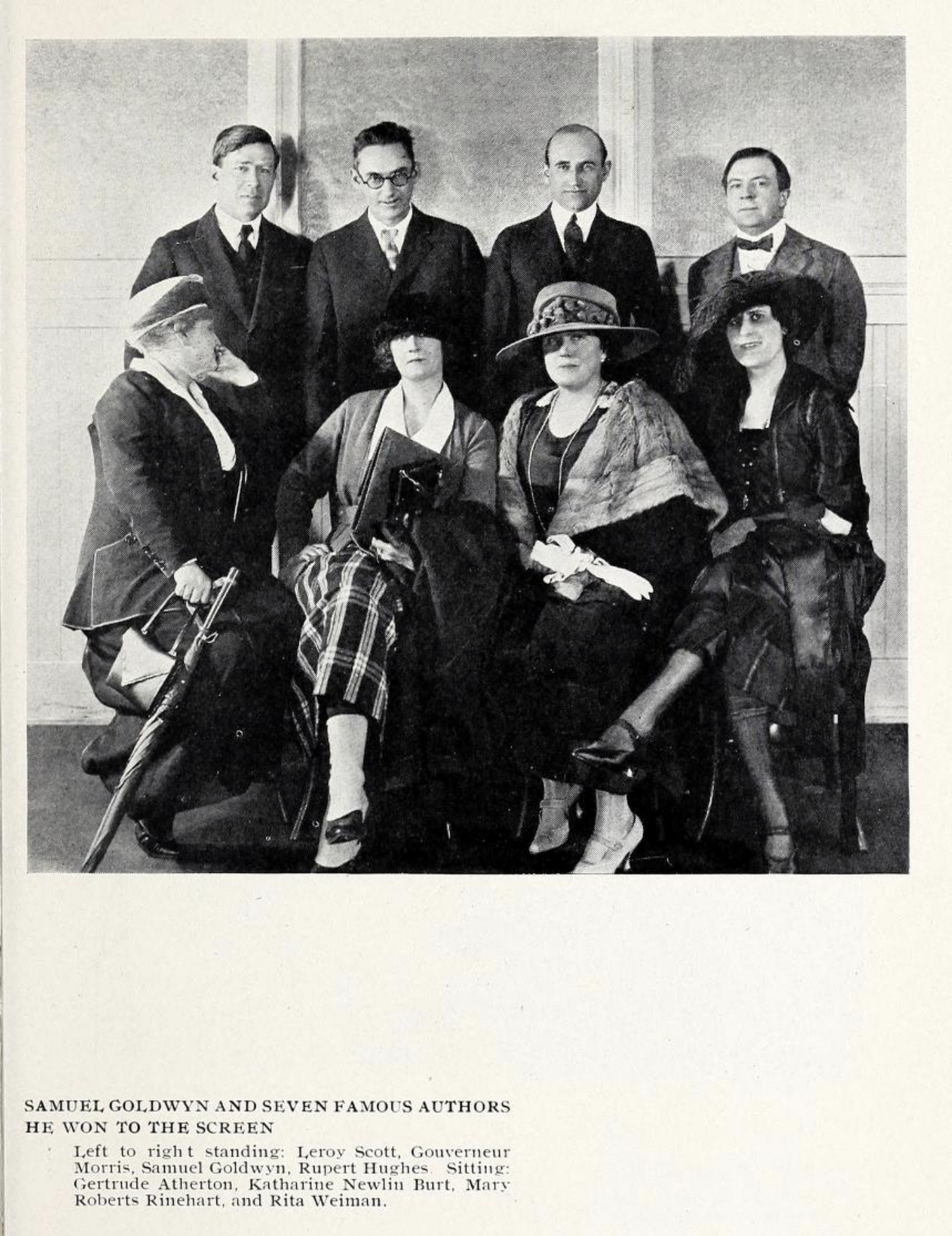
Katharine Newlin Burt (seated, second from left) with Samuel Goldwyn (standing, third from left) and six other "famous authors he won to the screen"

== Filmography ==
- The Branding Iron, 1920 (adapted from the novel)
- Snowblind, 1921 (adapted from the novel)
- The Man from Lost River, 1921 (story)
- Singed Wings, 1922 (adapted from the short story "Singed Wings")
- The Eagle's Feather, 1923 (story)
- The Leopardess, 1923 (adapted from the short story "The Leopardess")
- The Way of A Girl, 1925 (adapted from the novel The Summons)
- Body and Soul, 1927 (adapted from the short story "Body and Soul")
- The Silent Rider, 1927 (adapted from the short story "The Red-Headed Husband")
