= Zachariah Brigden =

American silversmith (1734–1787)

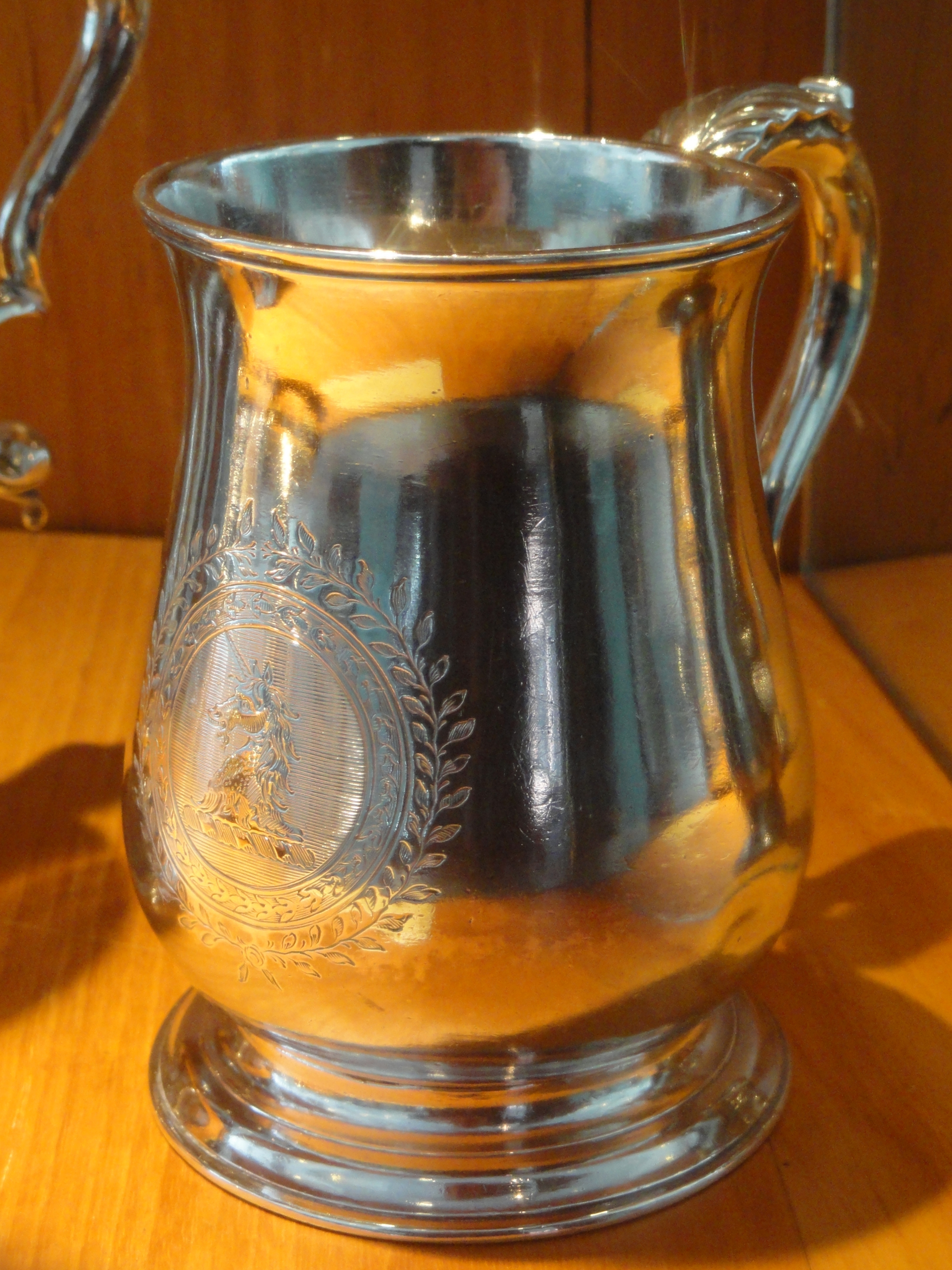
Cann, Zachariah Brigden, Boston, c. 1780, silver

Zachariah Brigden (December 21, 1734 - March 10, 1787) was an American silversmith active in Boston.

Brigden was born in Charlestown, Province of Massachusetts and apprenticed with Thomas Edwards. He was probably free as a journeyman when his master died in 1755, and in 1756 or later married Edwards's daughter Sarah, who was the principal beneficiary of her father's estate. His records, now archived in Beinecke Rare Book and Manuscript Library at Yale University, indicate that his shop employed 15 journeymen and apprentices, doing more business with repairs than in creation of new works. His works are in the collections of the Museum of Fine Arts, Dartmouth College, Yale University, Winterthur Museum, and elsewhere.
