= Dave Burt =

Australian rules footballer

Personal information
- Full name: David Trinham Burt
- Born: 23 January 1937
- Died: 14 February 2025 (aged 88)
- Original team: Ivanhoe Amateurs
- Height: 180 cm (5 ft 11 in)
- Weight: 76 kg (168 lb)

Playing career^{1}
Years	Club	Games (Goals)
1957	Collingwood	1 (0)
- ^{1} Playing statistics correct to the end of 1957.

David Trinham Burt (23 January 1937 – 14 February 2025) was an Australian rules footballer who played in 1957 with Collingwood Football Club in the Victorian Football League (VFL).
