= James C. Burt =

American gynecologist

James Caird Burt (August 29, 1921 – July 10, 2012) was an American gynecologist who was sometimes nicknamed the "Love Surgeon." After practicing for two decades while based in Dayton, Ohio, Burt was sued by female patients for altering their vulvas without their informed consent.

== Career ==
Burt was born in Dayton, Ohio, and earned his M.D. from the University of Rochester School of Medicine in 1945. He was licensed in Ohio in 1951.

Burt began performing "love surgery" in 1966. In his 1975 book, Surgery of Love, Burt wrote: "Women are structurally inadequate for intercourse. This is a pathological condition amenable by surgery." He claimed his surgery would turn women into "horny little mice" and asserted that "the difference between rape and rapture is salesmanship." Burt's procedures caused sexual dysfunction, infection and the need for corrective surgery in many patients.

In 1988, women subjected to the procedure came forward, eventually initiating several lawsuits. He voluntarily surrendered his license in January 1989, thereby avoiding a medical board hearing which might have uncovered more evidence against him. He subsequently divorced and declared bankruptcy due to the victim lawsuits totaling $21 million. Burt died in Dayton, Ohio in 2012.
