= William Burt House =

William Burt House may refer to:

- William Burt House (Brecksville, Ohio), listed on the National Register of Historic Places in Cuyahoga County, Ohio
- William Burt House (Beaver, Utah), listed on the NRHP in Beaver County, Utah
