= Benjamin Burt (surgeon) =

Australian ophthalmologist and oculoplastic surgeon

- Occupation: Oculoplastic surgeon
- Website: www.drbenjaminburt.com

Benjamin Burt is an Australian ophthalmologist and oculoplastic surgeon. He was awarded first in the world for International Council of Ophthalmology Prize Exam in 2000.

He has completed a dual fellowship at the University of California and in Auckland, New Zealand. He was professor of Texas Tech University's oculoplastic division from 2009 to 2012. He now lives and works in Melbourne, Victoria.

Burt also works with the Fred Hollows Foundation performing essential operations and training doctors in Cambodia.
