= William Burt (writer) =

English writer (1778–1826)

William Burt (23 August 1778 – 1 September 1826) was an English miscellaneous writer, son of Joseph Burt of Plymouth. He was educated at Exeter grammar school, and afterwards articled to a banker and solicitor at Bridgwater. Finally he practised at Plymouth as a solicitor until his death on 1 September 1826. He edited the Plymouth and Dock Telegraph for several years.

== Works ==
- Twelve Rambles in London, by Amicus Patriæ (1810)
- Desultory Reflections on Banks in general, and the System of keeping up a False Capital by Accommodation (1810)
- The Consequences of the French Revolution to England considered, with a view of the Remedies of which her situation is susceptible (1811)
- A Review of the Mercantile, Trading, and Manufacturing State, Interests, and Capabilities of the Port of Plymouth (1816)
- Preface to and Notes on N. T. Carrington's Poem "Dartmoor (1826)
- Christianity; a Poem, in Three Books, with Miscellaneous Notes (1835)
- Observations on the Curiosities of Nature (1836)
