= The Branding Iron =

1920 film

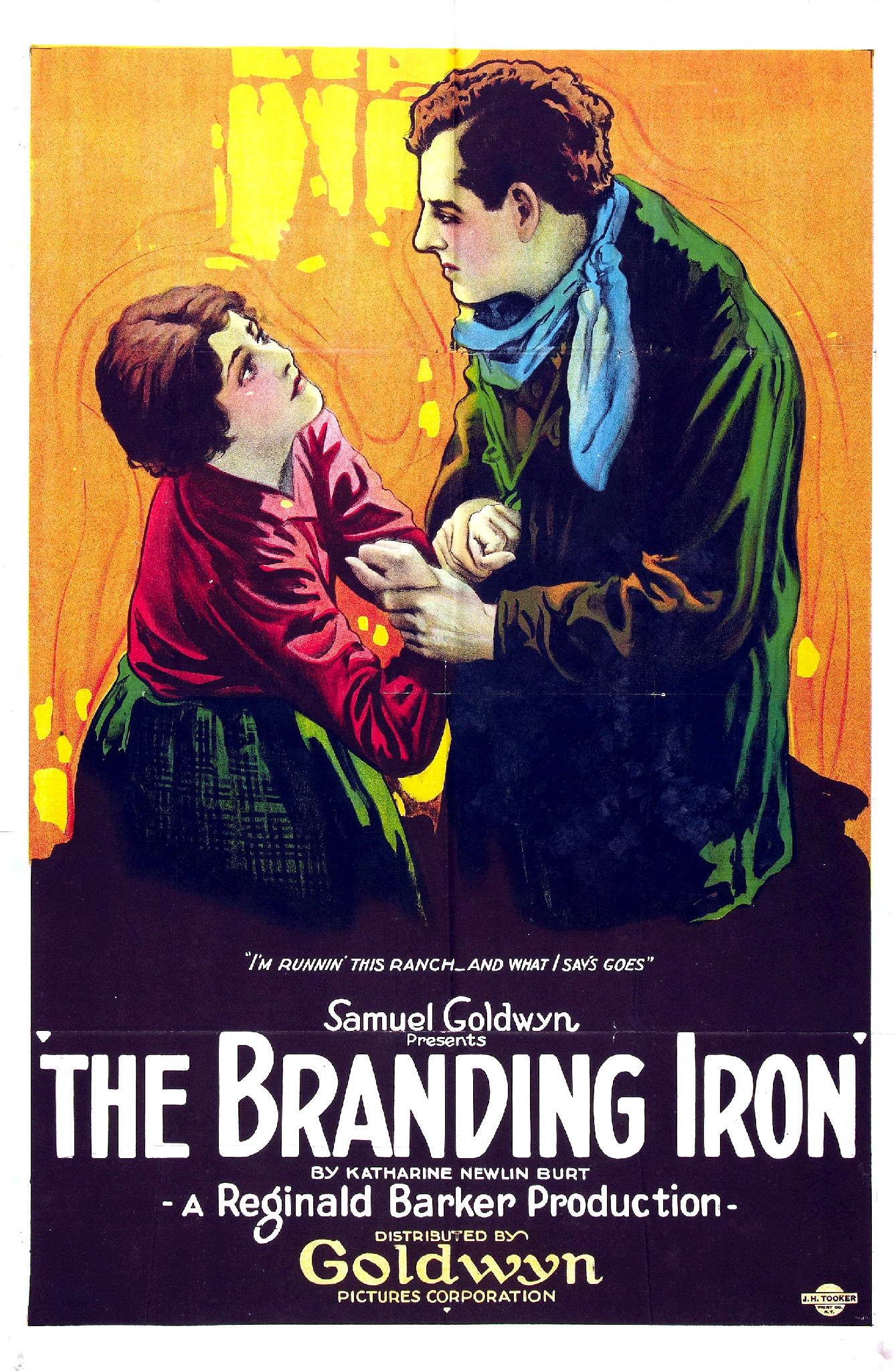
- Theatrical release poster
- Directed by: Reginald Barker
- Written by: J. G. Hawks
- Based on: The Branding Iron by Katharine Newlin Burt
- Produced by: Samuel Goldwyn; Reginald Barker
- Starring: Barbara Castleton; James Kirkwood
- Cinematography: Percy Hilburn (* French)
- Edited by: J. G. Hawks
- Distributed by: Goldwyn Pictures
- Release date: November 1920
- Running time: 70 minutes
- Country: United States
- Language: Silent (English intertitles)

The Branding Iron is a 1920 American silent drama film directed by Reginald Barker and starring Barbara Castleton and James Kirkwood. It was produced by Barker and Samuel Goldwyn and distributed by Goldwyn Pictures. Castleton appeared nude in the film, which caused the particular scene to be cut in some parts of the country. Pennsylvania banned the film altogether due to the topic of infidelity.

== Plot ==
As described in a film magazine review, Joan Carver runs away from her dissolute father and then meets and marries Pierre Landis, a young rancher. The father informs Pierre that he has married "the darter of a bad woman." After becoming jealous over an incident between Joan and the Reverend Frank Holliwell, Pierre flies into a rage and brands the young woman. Prosper Gael, a playwright on a hunting trip, walks into the cabin, shoots Pierre, and then takes Joan to his mountain cottage, which he had prepared to receive Betty Morena, the wife of a New York City impresario. He tells Joan that Pierre is dead, but later after she learns that Pierre is still alive, she attempts to return to him. Prosper finds her and brings her back to the cottage. She then runs away, feeling that she has sinned irretrievably against Pierre, and secures on an Arizona ranch, where the Morenas are staying. Pierre seeks her, and she goes with the Morenas to New York City, where Gael's latest play is about to be produced. The drama is written around the incident of the branding of Joan by Pierre. Pierre, attending the opening night performance, is moved by the play and sees Joan in the audience. He follows her to the Morena apartments, begs for her forgiveness, and there is a reconciliation between the two.

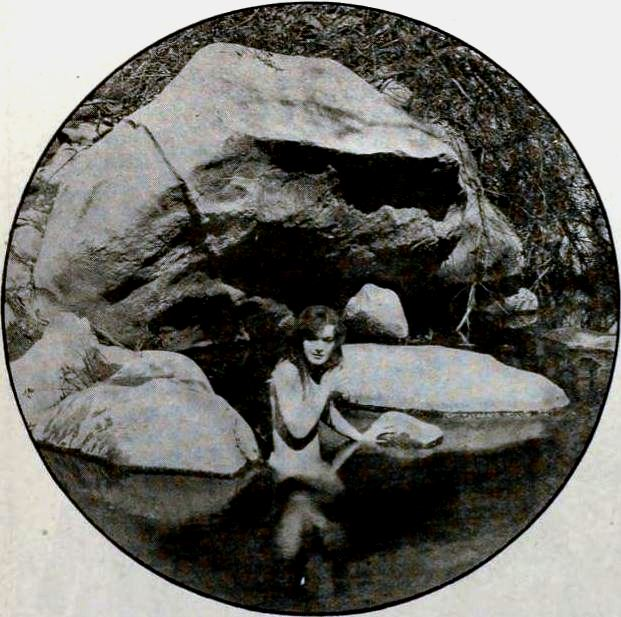
Still from the censored bathing scene.

== Cast ==
- Barbara Castleton as Joan Carver
- James Kirkwood as Pierre Landis
- Russell Simpson as John Carver
- Richard Tucker as Prosper Gael
- Sidney Ainsworth as Jasper Morena
- Gertrude Astor as Betty Morena
- Alan Roscoe as Reverend Frank Holliwell (credited as Albert Roscoe)
- Marion Colvin as Mrs. Upper
- Joan Standing as Maude Upper
- Louie Cheung as Wen Ho

== Censorship ==
The film included a scene in which Joan (Castleton) bathes in a mountain brook. The Pennsylvania State Board of Censors initially cut the bathing scene due to its nudity, and then banned the entire film from the state due to its plot breaching the topic of infidelity.

== Preservation ==
With no prints of The Branding Iron located in any film archives, it is a lost film.

== See also ==
- Godless Men (1920)
- Gertrude Astor filmography
- Film censorship in the United States
