= Frank Burt =

Frank Burt may refer to:

- Frank Burt (baseball)
- Frank Burt (screenwriter)
