= Marvin Burt =

American judge

Marvin F. Burt
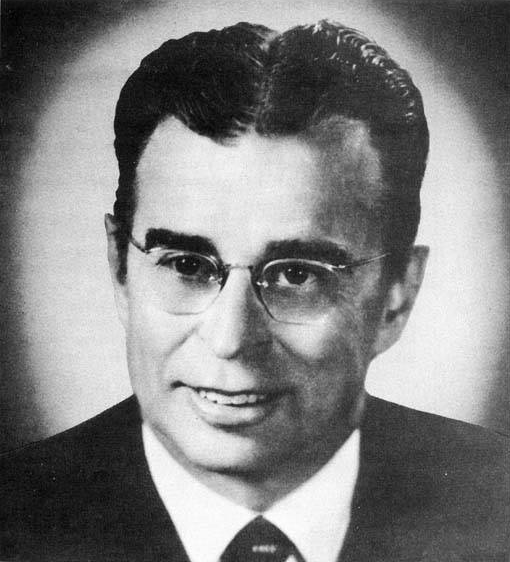
- Burt's official photograph, c. 1969
- Born: November 20, 1905; Freeport, Illinois
- Died: October 14, 1983 (aged 77)
- Occupations: politician, member of the Illinois Supreme Court

Marvin F. Burt (November 20, 1905 – October 14, 1983) was a Republican politician from Illinois and a member of the Illinois Supreme Court.

Burt was born in Freeport, Illinois, on November 20, 1905. He graduated from Harvard University with a Bachelor of Arts degree in 1928, and graduated from Chicago–Kent College of Law in 1931, subsequently practicing law in Freeport in 1931.

He served as the City Attorney of Freeport and as Master in Chancery of Circuit Court of Stephenson County. Later in his career, he was elected as an Illinois State Representative, and was re-elected three times, serving four terms. He was elected to the Illinois State Senate in November 1952, and was re-elected in 1956. He was elected as a Circuit Judge of the Fifteenth Circuit of Illinois in 1960, and was appointed to the Illinois Supreme Court in 1969, being succeeded by Roy Solfisburg a year later.

He had a wife, Helen, and two children, a son and a daughter.
