= John Graham MacDonald Burt =

Scottish physician and medical author

Burt in the Presidential gown of the Royal College of Physicians of Edinburgh

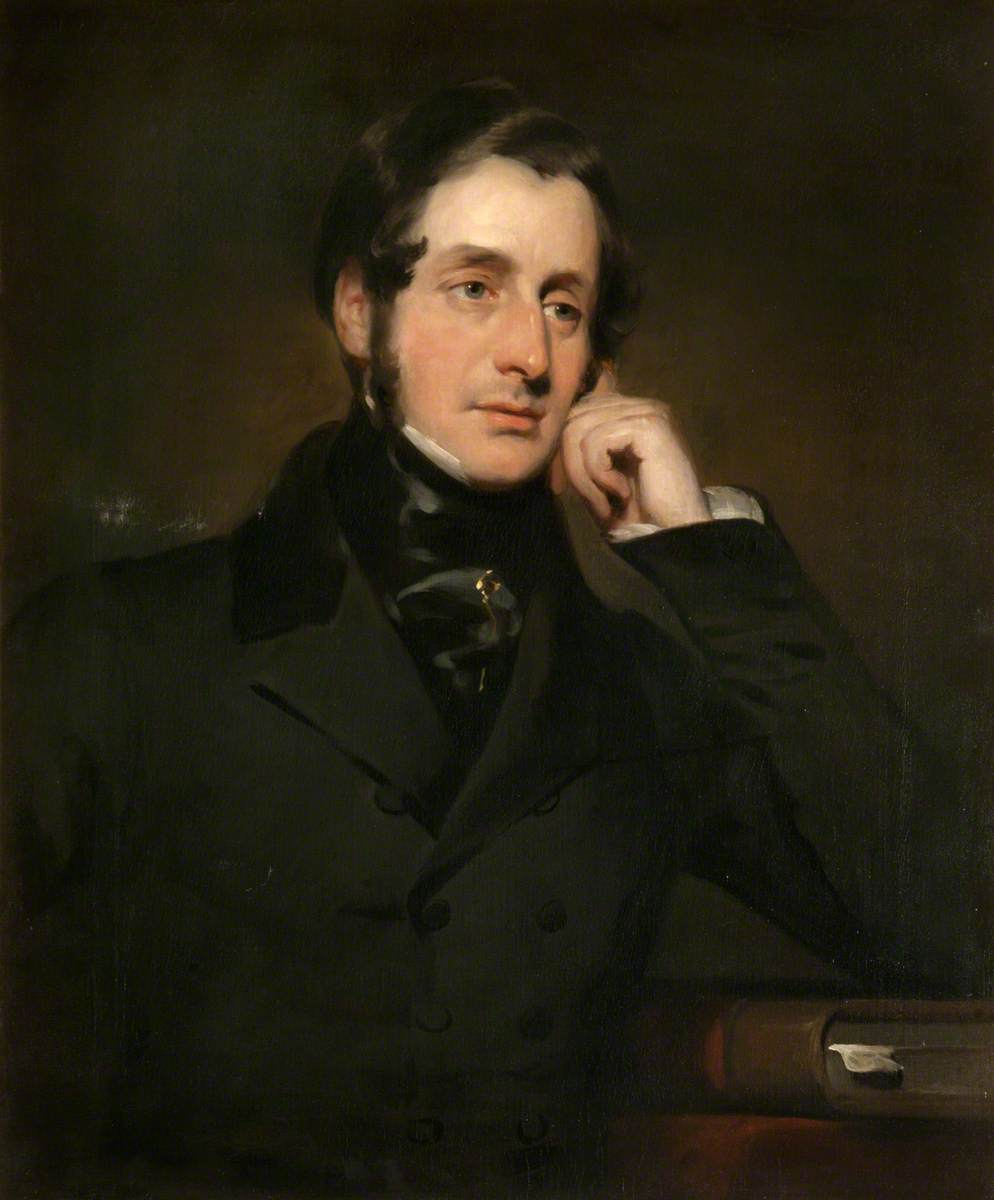
Portrait of John Graham MacDonald Burt

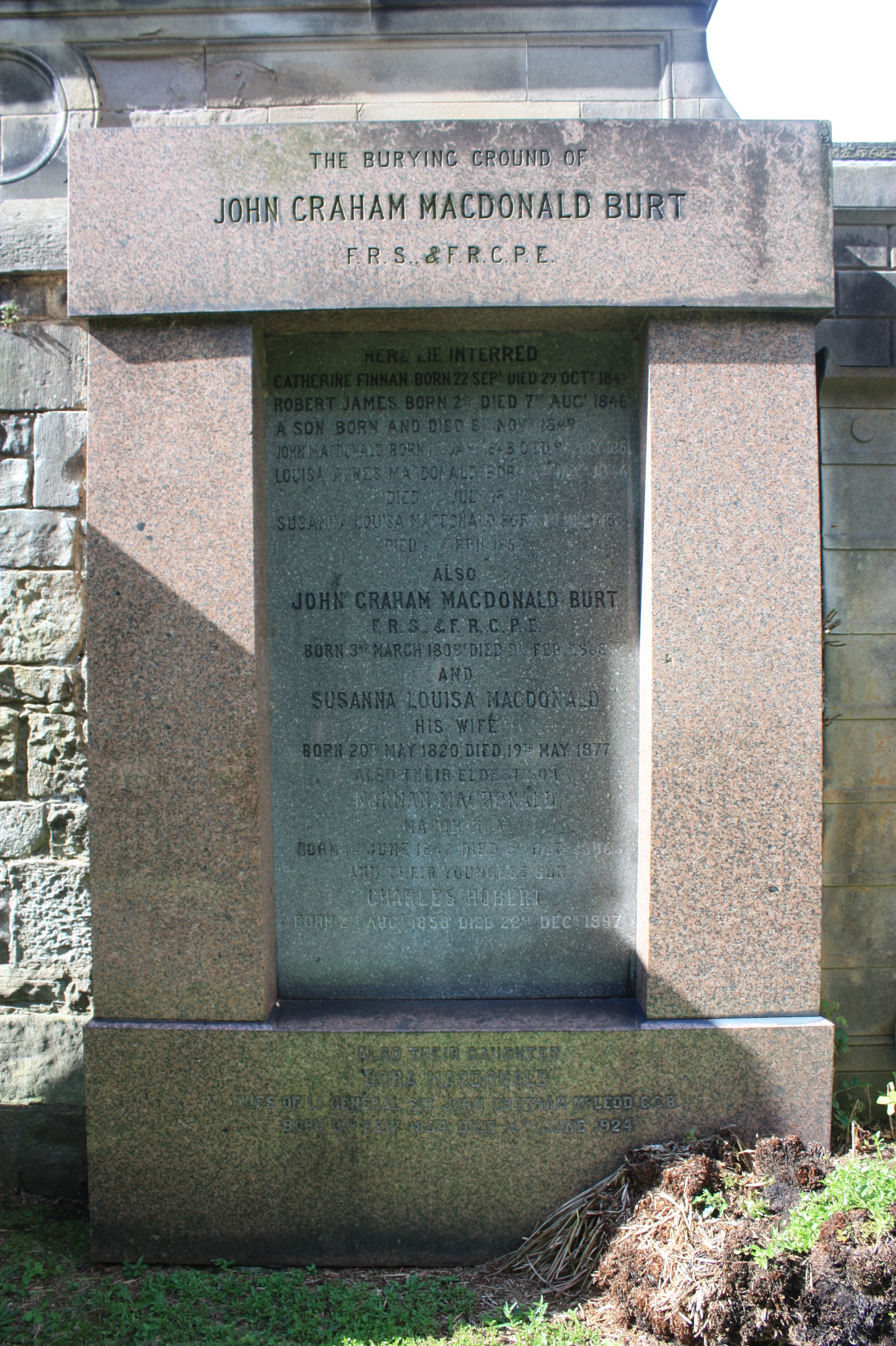
The grave of Dr John Burt, Dean Cemetery

Dr John Graham MacDonald Burt FRSE LLD (1809–1868) was a Scottish physician and medical author.

== Life ==
He was born on 3 March 1809, in Edinburgh as John Graham Burt. He added the name MacDonald upon marriage.

In the 1830s he is listed as a surgeon, living at 8 Bank Street in Edinburgh's Old Town.

In 1843 he was elected a member of the Aesculapian Club. He was elected a Fellow of the Royal Society of Edinburgh in 1845, his proposer being Robert Christison. In 1846 he was elected a member of the Harveian Society of Edinburgh. He was president of the Royal College of Physicians in Edinburgh from 1863 to 1865. He died on 9 February 1868. He was buried in Dean Cemetery in western Edinburgh, against the north wall of the original cemetery (backing onto the northern Victorian extension), with his wife Susanna Louisa MacDonald (1820-1877).

== Family ==
His son was Major Norman MacDonald Burt (1842-1886) of the Royal Artillery.

== Artistic recognition ==
A bust of Burt by George MacCallum is held at the Royal College of Physicians of Edinburgh.

Academic offices
Preceded by Dr David Craigie	President of the Royal College of Physicians of Edinburgh; 1863–1865	Succeeded by Dr John Smith
