= Edmund Burt =

Edmund Burt, also known as Edward Burt (died 4 January 1755), was a British writer and a rent collector for the British government in Scotland (Stevenson, 2004). In 1725, he referred to his wife living in London (Stevenson, 2004). On 31 May 1725, he was appointed Receiver General and Collector of Rents on the unsold Forfeited Estates in Scotland, and from 24 June, received £400 per annum to cover salary and expenses (Stevenson, 2004). Virtually all the Scottish estates forfeited after the Jacobite rising of 1715 had been sold except for those of Glenmoriston and Seaforth. Burt was concerned with collecting rents on them until they too were sold, in 1730 and 1741, respectively. His work involved close co-operation with General George Wade. However, he had no part in the building of the "Wade roads" in the Highlands.

In August 1725, Burt accompanied General Wade at the disarming of the Seaforth Mackenzies at Brahan Castle near Dingwall, when he was promised a punctual payment of rents. However, on 28 September, Wade was obliged to sign an order authorising military support to help him extract the promised rents, which the Seaforth tenants had failed to deliver.

A letter by a magistrate of Inverness dated 1 January 1726 reveals that Burt was then a Justice of the Peace, part of the 'haughty, keen and unsupportable government of these military and stranger judges set over us' (Salmond, 104). In 1729 he was appointed manager of the lead mines at Strontian in Argyll, and he continued to be employed in the Highlands for some years after 1741 (Stevenson, 2004).

== Letters from a Gentleman in the North of Scotland to his Friend in London ==
In about 1727 and 1728 Burt wrote a series of letters, later published as Letters from a Gentleman in the North of Scotland to his Friend in London (including a further letter written in around 1737), in which he summarized Wade's road-building achievements (Stevenson, 2004). The Letters contain important early engravings of Highland dress in and around Inverness.

Burt realized that the conditions he described would be regarded as highly offensive by Scots, so he swore his unknown correspondent in London to secrecy: "It would do me no great honour to be known to have made a collection of Incidents, mostly low, and sometimes disagreeable" (Burt, 1.3). When the letters were published anonymously in London in 1754, the editor claimed that he had bought them from the author, and stated that the author had "died some time ago, and through Losses, unsuccessful Law-Suits, and other Disappointments, left his Family in none of the best of Circumstances" (ibid., 1.vii).

After Burt's death in London on 4 January 1755, the obituaries in the Gentleman's Magazine and the Scots Magazine ascribed authorship of Letters to him (Stevenson, 2004). The announcement in the Scots Magazine, in Volume xvii, January 1755, page 52, states: "At London. Edmund Burt Esq; late agent to Gen. Wade, chief surveyor during the making of roads through the Highlands, and author of the letters concerning Scotland." The Scots Magazine reviewed the book in Volume xvi (July 1754), page 359.

Subsequent editions appeared in Dublin in 1755, in London in 1759 and 1815, and at Haarlem and Hanover. The latest was edited by R. Jamieson, with contributions by Sir Walter Scott, London, in 1818.

== Full text sources ==
- Letters from a gentleman in the north of Scotland to his friend in London, by Edward Burt, on the Internet Archive
- Letters from a gentleman in the north of Scotland to his friend in London, by Edward Burt, in Google books
