= Brent (name) =

- Gender: Male

Origin
- Origin: obscure – see article

Brent is an Old English given name and surname. The place name can be from Celtic words meaning "holy one" (if it refers to the River Brent), or "high place", literally, "from a steep hill" (if it refers to the villages in Somerset and Devon). The surname often indicates that one's ancestors lived in a place called Brent.

Brent has also become a regularly used given name in some countries, being among the thousand most common names for boys born in the United States since 1933. When used as a given name today, Brent is sometimes a short form of Brenton, but this was probably not the original inspiration for Brent's use as a given name, since Brenton's own regular use as a first name came many years after Brent was established in that role.

== Given name ==
=== A ===
- Brent Abernathy (born 1977), American baseball player
- Brent Adams (born 1990), American lacrosse player
- Brent Adams (born 1952), American football player
- Brent Alawas (born 1957), Filipino Episcopalian bishop
- Brent Albright (born 1978), American professional wrestler
- Brent Alexander (born 1971), American football player
- Brent Almond (born 1983), American film producer
- Brent Anderson (born 1955), American comics artist
- Brent Anderson (born ca. 1988), American country music singer
- Brent Anderson (born 1972), American politician
- Brent Anderson (born 1960), New Zealand rugby union player
- Brent Antonello (born 1989), American actor
- Brent R. Appel (born 1950), American judge
- Brent Arckey (born 1984), American swimming coach
- Brent Arnel (born 1979), New Zealand cricketer
- Brent Ashabranner (1921–2016), American Peace Corps administrator and writer
- Brent Ashley, American bassist
- Brent Ashton (born 1960), Canadian ice hockey player
- Brent F. Ashworth (born 1949), American collector
- Brent Assink, American philanthropist
- Brent Austin (born 2003), American football player

=== B ===
- Brent Bailey, American actor
- Brent Bambury (born 1960), Canadian radio and television personality
- Brent Barling (born 1961), Canadian soccer player
- Brent A. Barlow, American academic
- Brent Barraclough (born 1962), Canadian musician
- Brent Barrett (born 1957), American actor and tenor
- Brent Barry (born 1971), American basketball player
- Brent Bartholomew (born 1976), American football player
- Brent Barton (born 1980), American politician
- Brent Belecki (born 1977), Canadian ice hockey player
- Brent Belke (born 1965), Canadian guitarist and composer
- Brent Benjamin (born 1957), American judge
- Brent Bennett, United States Army soldier and war criminal
- Brent Berk (born 1949), American swimmer
- Brent Berlin (born 1936), American anthropologist
- Brent Billingsley (1975–2024), American baseball player
- Brent Bilodeau (born 1973), American ice hockey player
- Brent Blakey, Canadian politician
- Brent Boates, Canadian storyboard and visual effects artist
- Brent Bobyck (born 1968), Canadian ice hockey player
- Brent Boggs (born 1955), American politician
- Brent Bokovoy, American filmmaker
- Brent Bolte (born 1977), American football coach
- Brent Bolthouse (born 1969), American businessman
- Brent Bommentre (born 1984), American ice dancer
- Brent Booker (born 1975), American labor union leader
- Brent Bookwalter (born 1984), American racing cyclist
- Brent Bourgeois (born 1958), American rock musician
- Brent Bowden (born 1987), American football player
- Brent Bowers (born 1971), American baseball player
- Brent Boyd (born 1957), American football player
- Brent Bradshaw, American screenwriter
- Brent Brandon (born 1960), United States Air Force officer
- Brent Brede (born 1971), American baseball player
- Brent Brekke (born 1971), American ice hockey coach
- Brent Brennan (born 1973), American football player and coach
- Brent Brevak (born 1988), American racing driver
- Brent Brisben (born 1968), American treasure hunter
- Brent Briscoe (1961–2017), American actor and screenwriter
- Brent Brockman (born 1988), American soccer player
- Brent Budowsky (1952–2023), American journalist
- Brent Burge, American sound editor
- Brent Burns (born 1985), Canadian ice hockey player
- Brent Butler (born 1978), American baseball player
- Brent Butt (born 1966), Canadian comedian and actor

=== C ===
- Brent Calderwood, American journalist
- Brent Carelse (born 1981), South African soccer player
- Brent Carpenter, American television director, editor, cinematographer and producer
- Brent Carter (1948–2026), American poker player
- Brent Carver (1951–2020), Canadian actor
- Brent Cash (born 1967), American singer–songwriter
- Brent Catchpole, New Zealand politician
- Brent Celek (born 1985), American football player and executive
- Brent Chalem (1975–1997), American child actor
- Brent Chapman, Canadian politician
- Brent Charlesworth (born 1942), UK politician
- Brent Charleton (born 1982), Canadian businessman and basketball player
- Brent Christensen, United States career diplomat
- Brent Chua (born 1985), Chinese-Filipino model and fashion photographer
- Brent Clayton (born 1984), Australian firefighter
- Brent Clevlen (born 1983), American baseball player
- Brent Clode (born 1963), New Zealand canoeist
- Brent Cobb (born 1986), American songwriter-singer
- Brent Cockbain (born 1974), British international rugby union player
- Brent Collins (1941–1988), American actor
- Brent Comer, American actor
- Brent Cookson (born 1969), American baseball player
- Brent Cooper (born 1960), New Zealand judoka
- Brent Corrigan (born 1986), American film and pornographic film actor
- Brent Cotter (born 1949), Canadian politician
- Brent Coull, American statistician
- Brent Cox, American politician
- Brent Crane (born 1974), American politician
- Brent Crayon, American pianist and musical director
- Brent Crews (born 2008), American racing driver
- Brent Crisp (born 1986), Australian rugby league footballer
- Brent Crosswell (born 1950), Australian rules footballer
- Brent Crouch (born 1975), American volleyball coach
- Brent Cullaton (born 1974), Canadian ice hockey player

=== D ===
- Brent Dalrymple (born 1937), American geologist
- Brent Dancer, Australian field hockey player
- Brent Daniels (born 1999), Australian rules footballer
- Brent Darby (1981–2011), American basketball player
- Brent Dearmon (born 1984), American football player and coach
- Brent DeBoer (born 1975), American singer-songwriter
- Brent Deklerck (born 2006), Belgian gymnast
- Brent Dlugach (born 1983), American baseball player
- Brent Dickson (born 1941), American judge
- Brent Draper (born 1989), Australian cook and television presenter

=== E ===
- Brent Eccles, New Zealand-Australian drummer
- Brent Edison (born 1956), American attorney and politician
- Brent Hayes Edwards, Comparative literature scholar
- Brent Emery (born 1957), American cyclist
- Brent Erickson, American video game designer
- Brent Estabrook, American artist
- Brent Everett (born 1984), Canadian gay pornographic actor

=== F ===
- Brent Faiyaz (born 1995), American R&B singer
- Brent Fedyk (born 1967), Canadian ice hockey player
- Brent Fikowski, Canadian CrossFit athlete
- Brent Fischer (born 1964), American composer, bandleader, and musician
- Brent Fisher (born 1983), New Zealand footballer
- Brent Fitz (born 1970), Canadian-American musician
- Brent Fletcher, American television writer
- Brent Follett (1810–1887), British Conservative politician and barrister
- Brent Forrester (born ), American writer and producer
- Brent Foster (born 1967), New Zealand swimmer and triathlete
- Brent Foster (born 1982), Canadian documentary film director
- Brent David Fraser (born 1967), American actor and musician
- Brent Frankenhoff (born 1966), American author and editor
- Brent Franklin (born 1965), Canadian professional golfer
- Brent Frewen (born 1977), Australian rules footballer
- Brent Frohoff (born 1963), American beach volleyball player
- Brent Fullwood, American football player
- Brent Fultz, American materials scientist
- Brent Funderburk (born 1952), American painter and professor

=== G ===
- Brent Gabriël (born 1999), Belgian footballer
- Brent Gaff (born 1958), American baseball player
- Brent Gallaher (born 1969), American jazz saxophonist and composer
- Brent Galloway (1944–2014), American linguist
- Brent Gates (born 1970), American baseball player
- Brent Geiberger (born 1968), American professional golfer
- Brent Gibson, New Zealand Paralympian
- Brent Gilchrist (born 1967), Canadian ice hockey player
- Brent Giles (born 1953), Canadian curler
- Brent Glass (born 1947), American public historian
- Brent H. Goodfellow (born 1940), American politician and educator
- Brent Goulet (born 1964), American soccer player
- Brent Ryan Green (born 1984), American film director
- Brent Gretzky (born 1972), Canadian ice hockey centre
- Brent Grieve (born 1969), Canadian ice hockey player and coach
- Brent Griffiths (born 1990), English footballer
- Brent Grimes (born 1983), American football player
- Brent Grose (born 1979), Australian rugby league footballer
- Brent Guerra (born 1982), Australian rules footballer
- Brent Guy (born 1960), American football player and coach

=== H ===
- Brent Hagenbuch, American politician
- Brent Hailpern, American computer scientist
- Brent Hall (born 1986), Australian rules footballer
- Brent Handler (born 1968), American businessperson
- Brent Hanks, American sports commentator and professional poker player
- Brent Harding (born 1967), American bassist
- Brent Hardt, American diplomat
- Brent C. Harris, American attorney
- Brent Harting (born 1985), Australian rules footballer
- Brent Hartinger (born 1971), American writer
- Brent Harvey (born 1978), Australian rules footballer
- Brent Hassert (1952–2024), American politician
- Brent Hawkes (born 1950), Canadian clergyman and gay rights activist
- Brent Hawkins (born 1983), American football player
- Brent Hayden (born 1983), Canadian swimmer
- Brent Haygarth (born 1967), South African tennis player
- Brent Headrick (born 1997), American baseball player
- Brent Heaver (born 1971), Australian rules footballer
- Brent Hefford (born 1978), New Zealand cricketer
- Brent Hesselyn (1950–2002), New Zealand potter and sculptor
- Brent Hill (born 1949), American politician
- Brent Hilliard (born 1970), American volleyball player
- Brent Hills (born 1953), English football coach
- Brent Hinds (1974-2025), American guitarist and singer for the heavy metal band Mastodon
- Brent Hobba (born 1982), Australian basketball player
- Brent Hoberman (born 1968), British entrepreneur
- Brent Hocking, American entrepreneur
- Brent Hodge (born 1985), Canadian documentary filmmaker
- Brent Hoffman (born 1963), American politician
- Brent Hollamby (born 1964), New Zealand wrestler
- Brent Holsclaw (born c. 1971), American football coach
- Brent Honeywell Jr. (born 1995), American baseball player
- Brent Housman (born 1973), American politician
- Brent Howard, American politician
- Brent Huff (born 1961), American film director, actor and model
- Brent E. Huffman (born 1979), American film director
- Brent Hughes (born 1966), Canadian ice hockey player and coach
- Brent Hughes (born 1943), Canadian ice hockey player
- Brent Hutton (born 1964), Australian rules footballer

=== I ===
- Brent Imlach (1946–2017), Canadian ice hockey player
- Brent Iverson, American video game designer

=== J ===
- Brent Jacobson (born 1984), American politician
- Brent Janse van Rensburg (born 1980), South African rugby union coach and player
- Brent Jasmer, American film, stage and television actor
- Brent Jeffers, American football coach
- Brent W. Jeffs, American author
- Brent Jennings (born 1951), American actor
- Brent W. Jett Jr. (born 1958), American astronaut
- Brent Johnson (born 1963), American football player
- Brent Johnson (born 1976), Canadian football player
- Brent Jones (born 1963), American football player
- Brent Jones (born 1966), American gospel songwriter, singer, pianist, and choir conductor
- Brent A. Jones (born 1963), American politician
- Brent Jordan (born 1963), American author

=== K ===
- Brent Kallman (born 1990), American soccer player
- Brent Key (born 1978), American football player and coach
- Brent Kite (born 1981), Australian Rugby League player
- Brent Knackert (born 1969), American baseball player
- Brent Knowles, Canadian video game designer
- Brent Kolatalo, American mixer, record producer, engineer and songwriter
- Brent Kosolofski (born 1964), Canadian boxer
- Brent Krahn (born 1982), Canadian ice hockey player
- Brent Kutzle (born 1985), American musician

=== L ===
- Brent Ladds (born 1951), Canadian ice hockey administrator
- Brent Laes (born 2000), Belgian footballer
- Brent Laing (born 1978), Canadian curler
- Brent Lakatos (born 1980), Canadian wheelchair racer
- Brent Lang (born 1968), American swimmer
- Brent Larkham (born 1972), Australian tennis player
- Brent LaRue (born 1987), American-Slovenian athlete
- Brent Lasater (born 1960), American politician
- Brent Leach (born 1982), American baseball player
- Brent Learned, Native American painter
- Brent LeCras (born 1981), Australian rules footballer
- Brent Lee (born 1964), Canadian composer and professor
- Brent Leggs (born 1972), American architectural historian
- Brent Lepistu (born 1993), Estonian footballer
- Brent Liles (1963–2007), American bassist
- Brent Lilibridge (born 1983), American baseball player
- Brent Lindeque (born 1985), South African entrepreneur
- Brent Little (born 1983), American football player
- Brent Littllefield, American political strategist
- Brent Liufau (born 2004), French rugby union player
- Brent Livermore (born 1976), Australian field hockey player

=== M ===
- Brent Macaffer (born 1988), Australian rules footballer
- Brent MacNab (1931–2020), Canadian ice hockey player
- Brent Maddock, American film director, producer and screenwriter
- Brent Maher, American songwriter and record producer
- Brent Malone (1941–2004), Bahamian artist
- Brent Manalo (born 1997), Filipino actor
- Brent Mason (born 1959), American musician
- Brent Matehaere (born c. 1969), New Zealand basketball player and coach
- Brent Matich (born 1966), Canadian football punter
- Brent Mayne (born 1968), former Major League Baseball player
- Brent McAthey (born 1967), Canadian singer
- Brent McClanahan (born 1952), American football player
- Brent McConnell (born 1980), Australian rugby league footballer
- Brent McDonald, Canadian politician
- Brent McGrath (born 1991), Australian soccer player
- Brent McIntosh (born 1973), American attorney
- Brent McMahon (born 1966), Canadian Paralympic athlete
- Brent McMahon (born 1980), Canadian triathlete
- Brent McMillan (born 1958), American politician
- Brent McMurty (born 1986), Canadian cross-country skier
- Brent Meeke (born 1952), Canadian ice hockey player
- Brent Lee Metacalfe, Scholar of the Latter Day Saint movement
- Brent Metcalf (born 1986), American freestyle and folkstyle wrestler
- Brent Meuleman (born 1988), Belgian politician
- Brent Mikesell, American powerlifter
- Brent Miller (born 1974), Canadian actor and voice actor
- Brent Miller (born 1975), American film and television producer
- Brent Milligan, American record producer
- Brent Mishler (born 1953), American botanist and naturalist
- Brent Moloney (born 1984), Australian rules footballer
- Brent Money (born 1978), American politician
- Brent Monson (born 1985), Canadian gridiron football coach
- Brent Montgomery, American businessman
- Brent Morel (born 1987), American baseball player
- Brent Morin (born 1986), American comedian and actor
- Brent Moss (1972–2022), American football player
- Brent Moyle (born 1974), South African rugby union player
- Brent Musburger (born 1939), American journalist and sportscaster
- Brent Muscat (born 1967), American guitarist
- Brent Mydland (1952–1990), American keyboardist, member of the Grateful Dead

=== N ===
- Brent Naden (born 1995), Australian rugby league footballer
- Brent Nelsen, American political scientist
- Brent Newdick (born 1985), New Zealand decathlete
- Brent Newton, American legal scholar
- Brent Nicholson Earle (born 1951), American AIDS activist
- Brent Noon (born 1971), American shot putter
- Brent Novoselsky (born 1966), American football player

=== O ===
- Brent C. Overson (born 1950), American politician
- Brent Owens (born 1989), Australian cook

=== P ===
- Brent Palfreyman (born 1945), Australian cricketer
- Brent Paris, Canadian judge
- Brent Parker (born 1945), American politician
- Brent Parlane, New Zealand artist
- Brent Pease (born 1964), American football player and coach
- Brent Peters (born 1957), English football manager
- Brent Peterson (1958–2026), Canadian ice hockey player and coach
- Brent Peterson (born 1972), Canadian ice hockey player
- Brent Petrus (born 1975), American football player
- Brent Petway (born 1985), American professional basketball player
- Brent Pierce (born 1969), Canadian curler
- Brent Piltz (born 1978), Australian rules footballer
- Brent Pirow (born 1959), South African tennis player
- Brent Pope (born 1962), New Zealand born rugby television analyst
- Brent Pope (1973–2022), Canadian ice hockey player and coach
- Brent Poppen (born 1973), American paralympic sportsman, advocate, author, and teacher
- Brent Potter, Australian politician
- Brent Powell (born 1969), American politician
- Brent Price (born 1968), American basketball player
- Brent Primus (born 1985), American mixed martial arts fighter
- Brent Prismall (born 1986), Australian rules footballer
- Brent Pry (born 1970), American football player and coach

=== Q ===
- Brent Qvale (born 1991), American football player

=== R ===
- Brent Rademaker, American musician
- Brent Raedeke (born 1990), Canadian-German ice hockey player
- Brent Rahim (born 1978), Trinidad and Tobago footballer
- Brent Rathgeber (born 1964), Canadian politician
- Brent Raymer (born 1985), American stock car racing driver
- Brent Redstone (born 1951), American lawyer, heir and entrepreneur
- Brent Regner (born 1989), Canadian ice hockey player
- Brent Reiber (born 1966), Swiss former ice hockey referee
- Brent Reilly (born 1983), Australian rules footballer
- Brent Renaud (1971–2022), American journalist and filmmaker
- Brent Renouf (born 1988), Australian rules footballer
- Brent Richards (born 1990), American soccer player
- Brent Ridge, American physician, businessman and reality TV participant
- Brent Rivera (born 1998), American YouTuber, social media personality, and actor
- Brent Robbins (1970–2026), American psychologist
- Brent Roberts, American psychologist
- Brent Robinson (1951–1996), British academic
- Brent Roe (born 1956), Canadian artist
- Brent Rooker (born 1994), American professional baseball player
- Brent Roske, American film director
- Brent Ross (born 1970), Canadian curler
- Brent Rowan (born 1956), American session musician and record producer
- Brent Runyon (born 1977), American writer
- Brent Rushlaw (born 1951), American bobsledder
- Brent Russell (born 1980), South African rugby union player

=== S ===
- Brent Sadler (born 1950), American journalist
- Brent Sancho (born 1977), Trinidad and Tobago footballer and politician
- Brent Sanford (born 1971), American politician
- Brent Sass (born 1980), American dog musher
- Brent Saunders (born 1970), American biopharma executive and entrepreneur
- Brent Schaeffer (born 1986), American football player
- Brent Scott (born 1971), American basketball player and coach
- Brent W. Scott, American Navy chaplain
- Brent Scowcroft (1925–2020), American general and official
- Brent Seabrook (born 1985), Canadian ice hockey player
- Brent Severyn (born 1966), Canadian ice hockey player
- Brent Sexton, American actor
- Brent Sexton (born 1953), American football player
- Brent Shaw (born 1947), Canadian historian
- Brent Sherman (born 1974), American racing driver
- Brent Sherwin (born 1978), Australian rugby league footballer
- Brent Shields (born 1963), American television and film producer and director
- Brent Siegrist (born 1952), American politician
- Brent Sikkema (1948–2024), American art dealer
- Brent Simmons, American artistic gymnast
- Brent Simon (born 1978), American keyboard player
- Brent Smith (born 1973), American football player
- Brent Smith (born 1978), American singer for the band Shinedown
- Brent Snyder (born 1966), American football player
- Brent Sopel (born 1977), Canadian ice hockey player
- Brent Sommerhauser, American sculptor, glassblower and artist
- Brent Spence (1874–1967), American politician
- Brent Spencer (c. 1760–1828), British Army general
- Brent Spiner (born 1949), American actor
- Brent St. Denis (born 1950), Canadian politician
- Brent Stait (born 1959), Canadian actor
- Brent Staker (born 1984), Australian rules footballer
- Brent Stanton (born 1986), Australian rules footballer
- Brent Staples (born 1951), American editorial writer
- Brent Stewart, American law official
- Brent Steele (born 1947), American politician
- Brent Stirton, photographer
- Brent Stockstill (born 1994), American football player and coach
- Brent Stockwell, American chemical biologist
- Brent Stover, American sportscaster
- Brent A. Strawn, American biblical scholar and theologian
- Brent Strom (born 1948), American baseball player and coach
- Brent Stuart, New Zealand rugby league footballer and coach
- Brent Suter (born 1989), American baseball player
- Brent Sutter (born 1962) Canadian former ice hockey player
- Brent Syme (born 1956), Canadian curler
- Brent Symonette (born 1954), Bahamian politician

=== T ===
- Brent Talley, American politician
- Brent Tate (born 1982), Australian Rugby League player
- Brent Taylor (born 1968), American politician
- Brent Taylor (born 1959), Canadian politician
- Brent Thurman (1969-1994), American bull rider
- Brent Titcomb (born 1940), Canadian actor and musician
- Brent Todd (born 1964), New Zealand international rugby league footballer
- Brent L. Top (born 1953), American professor
- Brent Townsend, Canadian nature artist
- Brent Tremblay (born 1957), Canadian ice hockey player
- Brent Trolle (born 1947), New Zealand landscape painter
- Brent Tuckey (born 1979), Australian rules footballer
- Brent Turner (born 1954), American canoeist

=== U ===
- Brent Underwood, American YouTuber
- Brent Urban (born 1991), Canadian gridiron football player

=== V ===
- Brent Van Moer (born 1998), Belgian cyclist
- Brent Venables (born 1970), American football player and coach
- Brent Vermeulen (born 2001), South African actor
- Brent Vieselmeyer (born 1975), American football player and coach
- Brent Vigen (born 1975), American football player and coach

=== W ===
- Brent Wadden (born 1979), Canadian artist
- Brent Wallace, Australian rules football umpire
- Brent Waltz (born 1973), American politician
- Brent Ward (born 1979), New Zealand rugby union player
- Brent Waters, American computer scientist
- Brent Webb (born 1980), New Zealand international rugby league footballer
- Brent Webster, American lawyer
- Brent Weedman (born 1984), American mixed martial arts fighter
- Brent Weeks (born 1977), American fantasy writer
- Brent Weinbach, American actor
- Brent Werner (born 1974), American motorcycle speedway rider
- Brent White, American film editor
- Brent Whitfield (born 1981), American soccer player
- Brent A. Wilkes, American CEO
- Brent R. Wilkes (born 1954), American defense contractor
- Brent Williams (born 1964), American football player
- Brent Williams (born 1978), Australian rules footballer
- Brent Wilson, American documentary film director, writer and producer
- Brent Wilson (born 1981), New Zealand rugby union player
- Brent Wong (born 1945), New Zealand painter
- Brent Woods (1855–1906), Buffalo Soldier in the United States Army
- Brent Woolf (born 1998), Australian rugby league footballer
- Brent Wooten (1939–2011), American football player and coach

=== Y ===
- Brent Yonts (1949–2021), American politician

== Surname ==
=== A ===
- Allen Brent, Christian history and literature scholar

=== B ===
- Bix Brent (1923–1972), American singer
- Burt Brent, American plastic surgeon

=== C ===
- Charles Brent (1862–1929), Canadian-born missionary bishop of the Philippines and Episcopal Church saint

=== D ===
- Daniel Brent (1770–1841), American politician and diplomat
- Dannielle Brent (born 1979), English actress

=== E ===
- Earl K. Brent (1914–1977), American songwriter and composer
- Ebony Rainford-Brent (born 1983), English cricketer
- Eden Brent (born 1965), American musician
- Elinor Brent-Dyer (1894–1969), British novelist
- Eve Brent (1929–2011), American actress
- Evelyn Brent (1901–1975), American actress

=== G ===
- Gary Brent (born 1976), Zimbabwean cricketer
- Giles Brent (died 1672), American colonial mayor
- George Brent (1640–1694), Virginia planter and legislator
- George Brent (1899–1979), Irish actor
- George Brent (1817–1881), American judge
- George William Brent (1821–1872), Virginia politician

=== J ===
- Jeremiah Brent (born 1984), American interior designer and television personality
- John Brent (1808–1882), English novelist, poet and antiquary
- John Brent (1938–1985), American actor, comedian and beat poet
- Jon Brent (born 1956), Zimbabwean cricketer
- Jonathan Brent (born 1949), American academic, author, and publisher
- Joseph Brent (born 1976), American musician
- Joseph Lancaster Brent (1826–1925), Confederate officer and American politician
- Juanita Brent (born 1984), American politician
- JuJu Brents (born 2000), American football player

=== K ===
- K. J. Brent (born 1993), American football player

=== L ===
- Leslie Brent (1925–2019), German immunologist
- Linda Brent (1919–1994), American actress
- Lynton Brent (1897–1981), American actor

=== M ===
- Margaret Brent (1601–1671), American/Maryland lawyer, religious leader and planter and women's rights advocate

=== N ===
- Nathaniel Brent (c. 1573–1652), English college head

=== P ===
- Patrick Brent, American businessman
- Paul Archibald Brent (1907–1997), American musician

=== R ===
- Richard Brent (1757–1814), Virginia politician
- Richard P. Brent (born 1946), Australian mathematician and computer science professor
- Robb Brent (born 1987), American racing driver
- Robert Brent (1763–1819), American politician, first mayor of Washington D.C.
- Roger Brent (born 1955), American biologist
- Romney Brent (1902–1975), Mexican actor, director and dramatist

=== S ===
- Sally Brent (born 1951), American long-distance runner
- Suzi Brent (born 1977), British blogger

=== T ===
- Theodore Br2ent (1874–1953), American businessman
- Tim Brent (born 1984), Canadian ice hockey player
- Tommy Brent (1922–2011), American theatre producer
- Tony Brent (1927–1993), British singer
- Travis Brent (born 1992), American soccer defender

=== W ===
- Wayne Brent, American basketball player and coach
- William Brent Jr. (1783–1848), Virginia politician and American diplomat
- William Lee Brent (1931–2006), hijacker and civil rights activist
- William Leigh Brent (1784–1848), Maryland and Louisiana politician

== Fictional characters ==
- Brent, main protagonist in Beneath the Planet of the Apes
- Brent Abbott, character in the Saw franchise
- Brent Langer, character American police procedural television series, NCIS
- Brent Mustangburger, character from the media franchise, Cars
- Brent Taylor, character from British television soap opera, Hollyoaks
- Bundle Brent, Fictional character by Agatha Christie
- Corey Brent, character on the ITV soap opera Coronation Street
- David Brent, character on the BBC television comedy The Office
- Stefan Brent, character on the ITV soap opera Coronation Street

== Sources ==
- Hanks, P. & Hodges, F. (1988). A dictionary of surnames. New York: Oxford University Press. ISBN 0-19-211592-8.
- Mills, A. D. (1991). A dictionary of British place-names. New York: Oxford University Press. ISBN 0-19-869156-4.
