= Overson =

Overson is a surname. Notable people with the surname include:

- Brent C. Overson (born 1950), American politician
- Richard Overson (born 1959), English footballer
- Vince Overson (born 1962), English footballer and manager

== See also ==
- Iverson (surname)
- Overton (name)
