= Brent Wilkes =

Brent Wilkes may refer to:

- Brent A. Wilkes (born 1966), executive director of LULAC
- Brent R. Wilkes (born 1954), American defense contractor
