= Thomas Brent =

Thomas Brent may refer to:

- Thomas L. L. Brent (1784–1845), American diplomat
- Tommy Brent (1922–2011), American theater producer
