= Unbreakable (soundtrack) =

Unbreakable (Original Motion Picture Score)

Film score by James Newton Howard
- Released: November 18, 2000
- Recorded: 2000
- Venue: London
- Studio: AIR Studios; Abbey Road Studios
- Genre: Film score
- Length: 45:22
- Label: Hollywood
- Producer: James Newton Howard; James T. Hill

James Newton Howard chronology
Dinosaur (2000)	Unbreakable (2000)	Vertical Limit (2000)

Unbreakable (Original Motion Picture Score) is the film score to the 2000 film Unbreakable directed by M. Night Shyamalan, starring Bruce Willis, Samuel L. Jackson, and Robin Wright. It is the first instalment in the Unbreakable film series. The film score is composed by James Newton Howard and released through Hollywood Records on November 18, 2000.

== Development ==
James Newton Howard was approached by Shyamalan to work on Unbreakable immediately after scoring The Sixth Sense. "He sat there and storyboarded the whole movie for me", Howard said. "I've never had a director do that for me." Shyamalan wanted a "singularity" tone for the music. "He wanted something that was very different, very distinctive, that immediately evoked the movie when people heard it," Howard explained. Howard and Shyamalan chose to simplify the score, and minimized the number of instruments (strings, trumpets and piano), with limited orchestrations. It was recorded at AIR Studios Lyndhurst Hall, a converted church in London. "You could have recorded the same music in a studio in Los Angeles, and it would have been great, but there is something about the sound of that church studio," Howard remarked. "It's definitely more misterioso."

== Reception ==
Calling it a "moody, atmospheric score", Heather Phares of AllMusic wrote "The mix of symphonic and subtle electronic elements in Howard's score is an appropriate sonic backdrop for the film". Christian Clemmensen of Filmtracks wrote "Unbreakable is a more intelligent score than its predecessor, but its disembodied spirit on album once again fails to translate into a viable listening experience unless you're specifically in the mood for a Shyamalan-inspired atmosphere." Zanobard Reviews wrote "James Newton Howard created a moody, mysterious and pensively heroic style for Unbreakable, and this together with an abundance of spellbinding themes form one of the most unique and atmospherically intriguing superhero scores around."

Michael Gingold of Fangoria called it an "excellent score by James Newton Howard". Todd McCarthy of Variety called it a "supple, supportive score." Diego Pineda Pacheco of Collider listed it as one of the best superhero film scores and wrote "James Newton Howard was the mind behind the music of Unbreakable, and the result is a score as creative and distinctive as the film itself. It perfectly captures the mysterious mood of the story, mixing in some emotional and heroic elements that capture the movie's tone beautifully."

== Track listing ==
No.	Title	Length
1.	"Visions"	5:57
2.	"Reflection of Elijah"	4:08
3.	"Weightlifting"	3:43
4.	"Hieroglyphics"	2:01
5.	"Falling Down"	2:32
6.	"Unbreakable"	3:23
7.	"Goodnight"	2:25
8.	"The Wreck"	3:45
9.	"Second Date"	1:31
10.	"School Nurse"	1:22
11.	"Blindsided"	1:54
12.	"The Orange Man"	2:28
13.	"Carrying Audrey"	2:34
14.	"Mr. Glass / End Titles"	7:40
Total length:		45:22

== Personnel ==
Credits adapted from liner notes:

- Music composer – James Newton Howard
- Producer – James Newton Howard, James T. Hill
- Sound engineers – Andrew Dudman, Chad DeCinces, Neale Ricotti
- Drum programming – Steve Sidelnyk
- Recordist – Jake Jackson
- Recording and mixing – Shawn Murphy
- Mastering – Patricia Sullivan
- Score editor – Thomas S. Drescher
- Auricle control systems – Richard Grant
- Music preparation – Dakota Music Services

Orchestra

- Orchestra – Hollywood Studio Symphony
- Orchestration – James Newton Howard, Brad Dechter, Jeff Atmajian
- Leader – Rosemary Warren-Green
- Orchestra conductor – Pete Anthony
- Orchestra contractor – Isobel Griffiths

Choir

- Choir – Metro Voices, London Oratory School Schola Boys
- Choirmaster – Jenny O'Grady, Richard Niblett
- Conductor – Nick Ingman, Richard Niblett

Soloists

- Cello – Anthony Pleeth
- Piano – Simon Chamberlain
- Trumpet – Mark Bennett, Paul Archibald Brent

Management

- Soundtrack coordinator for Hollywood Records – Desirée Craig-Ramos
- Executive in charge of soundtracks for Hollywood Records – Mitchell Leib
- Executives in charge of music for the Buena Vista Motion Pictures Group – Bill Green, Kathy Nelson

== Accolades ==
Awards	Category	Recipient	Result	Ref.
International Film Music Critics Association	Film Score of the Year	James Newton Howard	Nominated	
