= Trolle (name) =

Trolle is a surname which is common in the Scandinavian countries. People with the surname include:

- Alice Trolle-Wachtmeister (1926–2017), courtier at the Royal Court of Sweden
- Ane Trolle (born 1979), Danish musician
- Brent Trolle (born 1947), New Zealand artist
- Eric Trolle (1863–1934), Swedish diplomat and governor
- Henrik af Trolle (1730–1784), Swedish naval officer
- Herluf Trolle (1516–1565), Danish admiral
- Michel Trollé (born 1959), French racing driver
- Orvar Trolle (1900–1971), Swedish swimmer
- Rolf Trolle Andersen (born 1945), Norwegian diplomat

== See also ==
- Trolle, Scanian noble family
