= Ray Webster =

Ray Webster may refer to:

- Ray Webster (first baseman) (born 1942), Major League Baseball player
- Ray Webster (second baseman) (1937–2020), Major League Baseball player
- Ray Webster (businessman) (1946–2026), New Zealand aviation executive, first managing director of easyJet
- Ray Webster (footballer), Australian rules footballer, see Mike Cronin
- Ray Webster (horseman), Australian horseman, see List of Melbourne Cup winners
