= Mikesell =

Mikesell is a surname. Notable people with the surname include:

- Brent Mikesell (born 1967), American powerlifter
- Deion Mikesell (born 1997), American rugby player
- Raymond Mikesell (1913–2006), American economist
- Taylor Mikesell (born 1999) American woman basketball player
