= Burt Brent =

American plastic surgeon

- Education: Chicago Medical School (M.D.); Wayne State University (B.S.)
- Occupations: Reconstructive plastic surgeon Sculptor

Burt Brent is a retired reconstructive plastic surgeon best known for his work in reconstructing the absent outer ear. He built upon the techniques of his mentor, Dr. Radford Tanzer of the Mary Hitchcock Clinic at Dartmouth Medical School, and repaired ear defects in 1,800 patients, most of them children born with ear deformities such as microtia. He also reconstructed ears lost or damaged by some form of trauma.

== Biography ==
=== Youth ===
Brent grew up in Detroit, Michigan, and was highly influenced by his maternal grandfather, who taught him cabinetry and woodworking. Although he considered a career in art, he was always surrounded by medicine because his father was a physician who had an office in the basement of their home. Eventually, his father influenced him to pursue a career in medicine, and Brent decided to study plastic surgery so that he could employ his artistic background within that field. He received his B.S. degree from Wayne State University in Detroit and his M.D. degree from Chicago Medical School.

Following his internship at the University of Michigan, Brent entered the U.S. Army as a general medical officer and served one year with the 101st Airborne Division. The following year, he transferred to Panama, where he served two more years as a medical officer with the Special Forces ("Green Berets"). It was at this time that he became fluent in Spanish, which served him well in helping many Latino patients.

=== Artist ===
As an avid naturalist, Brent is a member of the Society of Animal Artists and has created sculptures of numerous birds and mammals. Some of these are large bronze sculptures he donated to his young patients and other children to enjoy at the San Diego Zoo and the San Francisco Zoo.

=== Publications ===
Brent published more than 60 scientific articles and textbook chapters in the medical literature. He has coauthored, edited, and/or collaborated on several books:

- Earl Scruggs and the Five-String Banjo, Peer International Music Corporation, New York, 1968; 2nd Edition, Hal Leonard Music Corporation, Milwaukee, 2005.
- Brent, B. (Ed.): The Artistry of Reconstructive Surgery, C. V. Mosby Company, St. Louis, 1987.

== Medical practice ==
Brent specialized in ear reconstruction and had a private practice in Woodside, California. He was also on the teaching faculty at Stanford University Medical Center in Palo Alto, California. Brent, who learned sculpture before studying medicine, built upon and refined techniques developed by Dr. Radford Tanzer, who was a surgical professor at Dartmouth Medical College. He performed ear reconstruction surgery for more than 1,800 patients, most of them children born with ear deformities such as microtia. He also reconstructed ears lost due to some form of trauma. Due to his commitment and tenure in this practice, he saw children of previous patients who have a higher risk of having children with similar deformities. He was named Clinician of the Year in 2005 by the American Association of Plastic Surgeons. Several of Brent's earliest and notable patients were famous kidnapping victims who had their ears amputated and sent along with ransom notes. Reconstruction of their ears resulted in a Time magazine article entitled "Surgery as Sculpture" and was instrumental in launching public awareness of Brent's work to parents of children with congenital birth deformities of the ear.

Additional publications:

- 1. Tanzer, R.C.: "Total Reconstruction of the External Ear." Plastic & Reconstructive Surgery, 23:1, 1959.
- 2. Brent, B.: "Effective Safety Devices for the Padgett Dermatome." Plastic & Reconstructive Surgery, 51:467, 1973.
- 3. Brent, B.: "Magnetic Surgical Instrument Stand." Plastic & Reconstructive Surgery, 52:318, 1973.
- 4. Brent, B.: "Delayed Autogenous Cartilage Transplantation." Hines Veteransí Hospital Research Grant, Chicago, Illinois, 1972-1973.
- 5. Brent, B.: "The Role of Available Cartilage and the Operative Time Element in Auricular Reconstruction." In Tanzer, R. C., and Edgerton, M. T. (Eds.), Plastic Surgery Educational Foundation Symposium on Reconstruction of the Auricle, C. V. Mosby Co., St. Louis, pp. 88–90, 1973.
- 6. Brent, B.: "The Expansile Framework" in Autogenous Ear Reconstruction, Scientific Exhibit at the American Society of Plastic and Reconstructive Surgeons Annual Convention, Hollywood, Florida, 21–26 October 1973.
- 7. Brent, B.: "Ear Reconstruction with an Expansile Framework of Autogenous Rib Cartilage." Plastic & Reconstructive Surgery, 53:619, 1974.
- 8. Brent, B.: "Reconstruction of the Ear, Eyebrow, and Sideburn in the Burned Patient." Plastic & Reconstructive Surgery, 55:312, 1975.
- 9. Brent, B.: "Earlobe Construction with an Auriculomastoid Flap." Plastic & Reconstructive Surgery, 57:389, 1976.
- 10. Howell, S., Warpeha, R. L., and Brent, B.: "A Technique for Excising Earlobe Keloids." Surgery, Gynecology & Obstetrics, 141:438, 1975.
- 11. Brent, B.: "The Acquired Auricular Deformity: A Systematic Approach to its Analysis and Reconstruction." Plastic & Reconstructive Surgery, 59:475, 1977.
- 12. Tanzer, R. C., Converse, J. M., and Brent, B.: Chapter 35, "Deformities of the Auricle." In Converse, J. M. (Ed.), Reconstructive Plastic Surgery, 2nd Edition, W. B. Saunders Co., Philadelphia, 1977.
- 13. Brent, B., and Bostwick, III, J.: "Nipple-Areola Reconstruction with Auricular Tissues." Plastic & Reconstructive Surgery, 60:353, 1977.
- 14. Brent, B.: "The Role of Pressure Therapy in Management of Earlobe Keloids: Preliminary Report of a Controlled Study." Annals of Plastic Surgery, 1:579, 1978.
- 15. Brent, B. and Ott, R.: "Perichondro-Cutaneous Graft." Plastic & Reconstructive Surgery, 62:1, 1978.
- 16. Brent, B.: Chapter 13, "Reconstruction of the Ear." In Grabb, W. C., and Smith, J. W. (Eds.) Plastic Surgery—A Concise Guide to Clinical Practice, 3rd Edition, Little, Brown & Company, Boston, 1979.
- 17. Brent, B.: "Nipple-Areolar Reconstruction Following Mastectomy: An Alternative to the use of Labial and Contralateral Nipple-Areolar Tissues." Clinics in Plastic Surgery, 6:85, 1979.
- 18. Brent, B.: "The Versatile Cartilage Autograft: Current Trends in Clinical Transplantation." Clinics in Plastic Surgery, 6:163, 1979.
- 19. Brent, B.: "Replantation of Amputated Distal Phalangeal Parts of Fingers Without Vascular Anatastomoses, Using Subcutaneous Pockets." Plastic & Reconstructive Surgery, 63:1, 1979.
- 20. Brent, B.: One-year follow-up on distal phalangeal replantation with subdermal pocketing (letter to the editor). Plastic & Reconstructive Surgery, 64:817, 1979.
- 21. Brent, B.: "The Correction of Microtia with Autogenous Cartilage Grafts, Part I: The Classic Deformity." Plastic & Reconstructive Surgery, 66:1, 1980.
- 22. Brent, B.: "The Correction of Microtia with Autogenous Cartilage Grafts, Part II: Atypical and Complex Deformities." Plastic & Reconstructive Surgery, 66:13, 1980.
- 23. Brent, B.: "Reconstruction of the Microtic Ear with Autogenous Rib Cartilage." In Recent Advances in Plastic Surgery, Jackson, I. T., (Ed.), Churchill Livingston Company, Edinburgh, 1981.
- 24. Brent, B.: "Surgical Treatment of Congenital Disorders of the External Ear." In Serafin, D., and Georgiade, N. G. (Eds.), Pediatric Plastic Surgery, C. V. Mosby Company, St. Louis, 1981.
- 25. Brent, B.: "A Personal Approach to Total Auricular Reconstruction: Case Study." Clinics in Plastic Surgery, 8:211, 1981.
- 26. Brent, B.: Discussion of "A poly(HEMA) Sponge for Restoration of Articular Cartilage Defects" by Con, M. and De Visser, A. C. Plastic & Reconstructive Surgery, 67:294, 1981.
- 27. Brent, B.: Discussion of "Neocartilage Derived from Transplanted Perichondrium. What is it?" by Upton, J., Sohn, S. A., and Glowacki, J. Plastic & Reconstructive Surgery, 68:173, 1981.
- 28. Brent, B.: "Complications of Auricular Reconstruction -- Avoidance and Management." In Goldwyn, R. M. (Ed.), The Unfavorable Result in Plastic Surgery, Little, Brown, and Company, Boston, Third Edition, 1982.
- 29. Brent, B.: "The Microtic Ear." In Kernahan D., and Thompson, H. (Eds.), Plastic Surgery Educational Foundation Symposium on Pediatric Plastic Surgery, C. V. Mosby Company, St. Louis, 1982.
- 30. Brent, B.: Discussion of "An improved one-stage total ear reconstruction procedure" by Song, Y. and Song, Y. Plastic & Reconstructive Surgery, 71:623, 1983.
- 31. Brent, B., and Byrd, H. S.: "Secondary Ear Reconstruction with Cartilage Grafts Covered by Axial, Random, and Free Flaps of Temporoparietal Fascia." Plastic & Reconstructive Surgery, 72:141, 1983.
- 32. Brent, B.: Discussion of the correlation between a constructed auricle's definition and the healed chest scar's quality. In "Problems encountered in contouring a reconstructed ear of autogenous cartilage" by Yanai, A., Fukuda, O., and Yamada, A. Plastic & Reconstructive Surgery, 75:191, 1985.
- 33. Brent, B., Upton, J., Acland, R. D., et al.: "Experience with the Temporoparietal Fascial Free Flap." Plastic & Reconstructive Surgery, 76:177, 1985.
- 34. Brent, B.: "Nasal Alar Repair: The Auricular Composite Graft." In Brent, B. (Ed.): The Artistry of Reconstructive Surgery, C. V. Mosby Company, St. Louis, 1987, pp. 63–66.
- 35. Brent, B.: "Auricular Repair with a Conchal Cartilage Graft." In Brent, B. (Ed.): The Artistry of Reconstructive Surgery, C. V. Mosby Company, St. Louis, 1987, pp. 107–112.
- 36. Brent, B.: "Total Auricular Construction with Sculpted Costal Cartilage." In Brent, B. (Ed.): The Artistry of Reconstructive Surgery, C. V. Mosby Company, St. Louis, 1987, pp. 113–128.
- 37. Brent, B.: "Auricular Reconstruction with a Fascial Transposition Flap." In Brent, B. (Ed.): The Artistry of Reconstructive Surgery, C. V. Mosby Company, St. Louis, 1987, pp. 129–138.
- 38. Brent, B., And Finseth, F.: "Microsurgical Ear and Scalp Reconstruction with a Fasciocutaneous Free Flap." In Brent, B. (Ed.): The Artistry of Reconstructive Surgery, C. V. Mosby Company, St. Louis, 1987, pp. 139–149.
- 39. Brent, B.: "Reconstruction of the Eyebrow and Eyelashes with Free Grafts." In Brent, B. (Ed.): The Artistry of Reconstructive Surgery, C. V. Mosby Company, St. Louis, 1987, pp. 199–202.
- 40. Brent, B.: "Restoring Fronto-Orbital Contour with Autogenous Rib Cartilage." In Brent, B. (Ed.): The Artistry of Reconstructive Surgery, C. V. Mosby Company, St. Louis, 1987, pp. 421–424.
- 41. Brent, B.: "Restoration of Thermally Injured Facial Features." In Brent, B. (Ed.): The Artistry of Reconstructive Surgery, C. V. Mosby Company, St. Louis, 1987, pp. 439–445.
- 42. Brent, B.: "Temporomandibular Joint Repair with an Auricular Perichondrial Graft." In Brent, B. (Ed.): The Artistry of Reconstructive Surgery, C. V. Mosby Company, St. Louis, 1987, pp. 539–448.
- 43. Brent, B.: "Chin Contouring with a Laminated Cartilage Graft." In Brent, B. (Ed.): The Artistry of Reconstructive Surgery, C. V. Mosby Company, St. Louis, 1987, pp. 597–604.
- 44. Brent, B., Acland, R. D., and Upton, J.: "Extremity Repair with Temporal Fascial Free Flaps." In Brent, B. (Ed.): The Artistry of Reconstructive Surgery, C. V. Mosby Company, St. Louis, 1987, pp. 789–800.
- 45. Brent, B,: "Nipple-Areola Reconstruction Following Mastectomy: Mimicry with Assorted Tissue Grafts and Tattoo Pigments." In Brent, B. (Ed.): The Artistry of Reconstructive Surgery, C. V. Mosby Company, St. Louis, 1987, pp. 933–946.
- 46. Brent, B.: Epilogue: "Learn to Make Wings: Thoracobrachial Pterygoplasty Powered by Muscle Transposition Flaps." In Brent, B. (Ed.): The Artistry of Reconstructive Surgery, C. V. Mosby Company, St. Louis, 1987, pp. 958–970.
- 47. Brent, B.: "Reconstruction of the Auricle." Book chapter in McCarthy, J. G. (Ed.), Plastic Surgery, W. B. Saunders Co., Philadelphia, 1990, vol. 3, pp. 2094–2152.
- 48. Brent, B.: "Repair and Grafting of Cartilage and Perichondrium." Book chapter in McCarthy, J. G. (Ed.) Plastic Surgery, W. B. Saunders Co., Philadelphia, 1990, vol. 1, pp. 559–580.
- 49. Brent, B.: Chapter 15, "Reconstruction of the Ear," In Grabb, W. C., and Smith, J. W. (Eds.), Plastic Surgery—A Concise Guide to Clinical Practice, 4th edition, Little, Brown & Company, Boston, 1991.
- 50. Brent, B.: "Auricular Repair with Autogenous Rib Cartilage Grafts: Two Decades of Experience with 600 Cases." Plastic & Reconstructive Surgery, 90:355, 1992.
- 51. Brent, B.: Discussion of "Modification of the stages in total reconstruction of the auricle," by Nagata, S. Plastic Reconstructive Surgery, 93:267-268, 1994.
- 52. Brent, B.: Microtia repair with autogenous rib cartilage grafts. In Munro, I. R. and Brent, B. (Eds.) : Microtia and Hemifacial Microsomia. Operative Techniques in Plastic and Reconstructive Surgery, 1:69-76, 1994.
- 53. Brent, B.: Reconstruction of the Ear. Book chapter in Grabb, W. C., and Smith, J. W. (Eds.), Plastic Surgery—A Concise Guide to Clinical Practice, 5th edition. Little, Brown & Co., Boston, 1997.
- 54. Saadeh, P.B, Brent, B., Longacre, M., et al.: Human Cartilage Engineering: Chondrocyte extraction, proliferation, and characterization. Ann. Plast. Surg., 42: 509, 1999.
- 55. Brent, B.: The pediatricians' role in caring for patients with congenital microtia and atresia: clinical experience with 1,000 patients. In Brent, B. (Guest Ed.) Pediatric Ear Disease, in Pediatric Annals, 28: 374, 1999.
- 56. Brent, B.: Technical advances in ear reconstruction with autogenous rib cartilage grafts—A Personal Review of 1,200 cases. Plast. Reconstr. Surg., 104: 319, 1999.
- 57. Brent, B.: Ear Reconstruction. Book chapter in Schendel, S.A., Ward Booth, P., and Hausemann, J.E. (Eds.), Maxillofacial Surgery, W. B. Saunders Co, Philadelphia, 1999.
- 58. Brent, B.: Microtia Repair with Autogenous Rib Cartilage Grafts. Book chapter in Evans, G.R.D. (Ed.), Operative Plastic Surgery, Appleton & Lange, Stamford, Ct., 2000.
- 59. Brent, B.: The Team Approach to Treating the Microtia-Atresia Patient. Otolarng. Clinics of North America, 33: 1353, 2000.
- 60. Brent, B.: Microtia repair with rib cartilage grafts: A review of personal experience with 1,000 cases. Clin. Plast. Surg. 29: 257, 2002
- 61. Brent, B.: Reconstruction of the Auricle. Book chapter in Mathes, S.J. (Ed.), Plastic Surgery, Saunders, Elsevier, Philadelphia, 2006.
- 62. Brent, B.: Ear Reconstruction. Book chapter in Schendel, S.A., Ward Booth, P., and Hausemann, J.E. (Eds.), Maxillofacial Surgery, 2nd Ed. Elsevier Publishing Co., 2007.
- 63. Brent, B.: The Reconstruction of Venus: Following Our Legacy (An editorial). Plastic & Reconstructive Surgery, 121: 2170, 2008.
- 64. Brent, B.: "Hydrodissection as Key to a Natural-Appearing Otoplasty." Plastic & Reconstructive Surgery, 122:1055, 2008.

== Honor and recognition ==
Medical honors:

- Distinguished Alumnus Award, the Chicago Medical School.
- Grand Prize, Annual National Plastic Surgery Senior Residents' Conference.
- Two-time Recipient of the James Barrett Brown Award for the most significant publication in the world literature of plastic surgery in the year.
- Presidential Citation – Triological Society (The American Laryngological, Rhinological and Otological Society)
- Clinician of the Year (Lifetime Achievement Award). Presented by American Association of Plastic Surgeons.
- Presidential Citation, American Otological Society

Art honors:

- Society of Animal Artists Members Choice Award - 1994
- Society of Animal Artists Award of Excellence - 1995, 1996, 2000, 2005, 2009
- Society of Animal Artists Memorial Award for Interpretive Sculpture - 1994, 2000, 2000

=== Featured media ===
- TLC's Plastic Surgery: Before & After
- Discovery Channel
- NOVA

== See also ==
- El Camino Hospital
