= Greymouth High School =

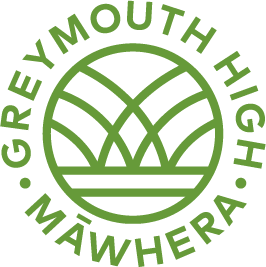

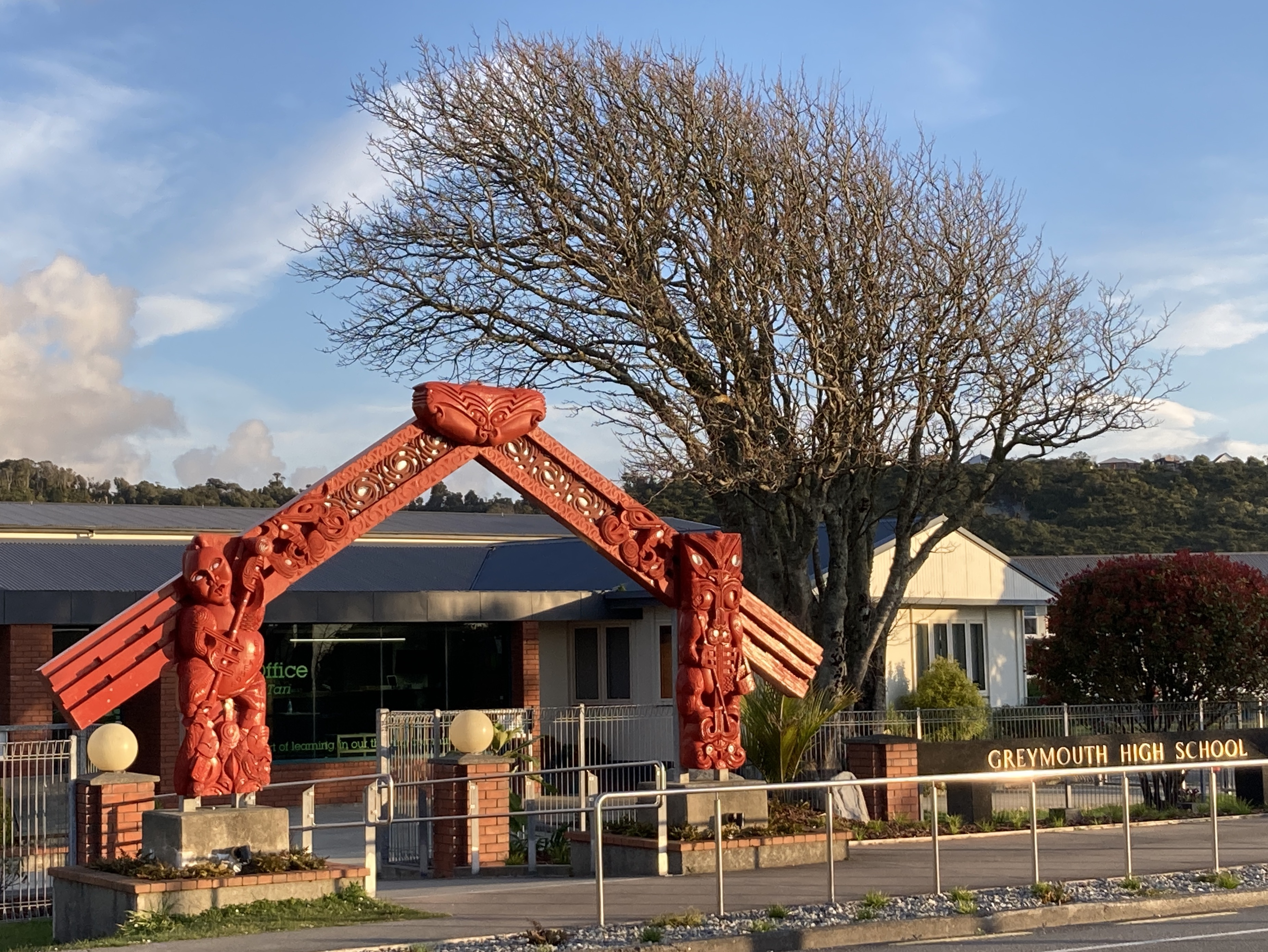

Location
- High Street, Greymouth, New Zealand; 42.4627°S 171.1972°E

Information
- Type: State, Co-educational, Secondary
- Motto: Labore et Honore (original motto 1923 – c. 1970). Whāia te iti kahurangi – Strive for Success
- Established: 1923
- Ministry of Education Institution no.: 303
- Principal: Samantha Mortimer
- Enrolment: 522 (July 2026)
- Socio-economic decile: 4
- Website: greyhigh.school.nz

Greymouth High School is one of two post-primary schools in Greymouth, New Zealand. The other is John Paul II High School. It is the largest school on the West Coast of New Zealand with a roll of 522 students. As of 2021 the principal is Samantha Mortimer. She is the first female principal of the high school.

== History ==
In 1923, the Greymouth District High School, once part of the old Grey Main School, and various technical classes in the borough amalgamated. As the District expanded, so did the school and in 1968 the roll number was 725.

The original brick building was an L-shaped block consisting of six classrooms. Located in the southern part of town, the site in 1922 was covered in thick bush and drainage of the ground proved an early problem.

The first director of the school was Mr J. Hutton, M.A. and in 1923 there were 10 staff.

In the first year, Greymouth High School offered classes for Third, Fourth and Fifth Forms, commercial (two) and engineering. Evening classes were held in academic, commercial and trades subjects. There were 210 day-school pupils.

A library was established during the first year of operation, but as the number of classrooms was inadequate, it became a typing room and the books were housed in a classroom until more recent years.

Twelve prefects were appointed from 1923 and the school was divided into four tribes. This assisted in the organisation of sporting activities. A school cadet corps flourished in 1923 and a camera and dramatic club were established in 1924. The Māwhera Gazette, the school's magazine, was first published in 1924.

The school experienced declining rolls during the late 1980s and early 1990s but numbers began to build again and in 1993 the school roll numbered 650 with 40 staff.

=== Building additions ===
To address the increasing roll numbers, additions were made to the original building. A block of three classrooms was added in 1925 and in 1930 a further block of three classrooms was built. A technical block was added in 1939 consisting of woodwork, engineering and technical drawing rooms. A homecraft block was added in 1940 comprising dressmaking and cooking rooms, laundry and model flat and completing a four-sided arrangement of buildings. Plumbing and motor sops were added later.

Wartime economy and post-war shortages halted the building programme.

From 1953, a period of great expansion commenced when a technical drawing room and two extra classrooms were built. These were followed in 1955 with an administration block, assembly hall, music, art, commercial and other classrooms. In 1956 a social studies block and library were added and a gymnasium was opened in 1957.

Five years after the school was opened, a hostel to accommodate country pupils was built about a quarter of a mile from the school. In 1957 this was expanded by the addition of a dormitory and ablution block and the enlargement of the dining room and kitchen facilities.

== Māwhera Services Academy ==
Greymouth High School established Māwhera Services Academy (MSA) in 2002, a military oriented course, with funding from the Tertiary Education Commission, New Zealand. There are now over 25 service academies throughout New Zealand.

=== Karoro Learning ===
Greymouth High School established Karoro Learning in 1994 who specialised in training job-seekers both on-campus and as an early distance learning provider throughout New Zealand (branded Learn@Home).

Karoro Learning was sold to Front-line Training Consultancy Ltd in 2015.

== Notable alumni ==
- Rick Barker (born 1951) – cabinet minister of the New Zealand Government 2002–2008
- John Cairney (1898–1966) – anatomist, physician and Director General of Health
- Helen Duncan (née Nielson, 1941–2007) – New Zealand politician and a member of the Labour Party
- Fred Goodall (1938–2021) – New Zealand international cricket umpire
- Slade Griffin (born 1991) – international rugby league footballer, Melbourne Storm 2017 Premiership Player
- Brent Hesselyn (1950–c2001) – New Zealand potter and sculptor
- Amy Johnston (1872–1908) – early New Zealand dentist
- Grant Lingard (1961–1995) – New Zealand artist focused on minimalist sculptural installations with found objects
- Dave McKenzie (born 1943) – New Zealand runner who won the Boston Marathon in 1967
- Philip Ross May (1929–1977) – New Zealand historian, author of West Coast Gold Rushes (1962)
- Janice M. Morse (née Hambleton, born 15 December 1945) – an anthropologist and nurse researcher
- Griffin Neame (born March 2001) – North Queensland Cowboys
- Bill Pearson (1922–2002) – New Zealand writer
- Jackie Thomas (born 1990) – singer of The X Factor fame
- Ian Watkin (1940–2016) – New Zealand actor who appeared in the films Braindead and Sleeping Dogs
- Ray Webster (1946–2026) – Airline executive and first managing director of the British low-cost airline easyJet.

== Notable staff ==
- Peter Hooper taught English at Greymouth High School and was Assistant Principal until his death in 1991.
