= Brent Foster (director) =

Canadian documentary film director

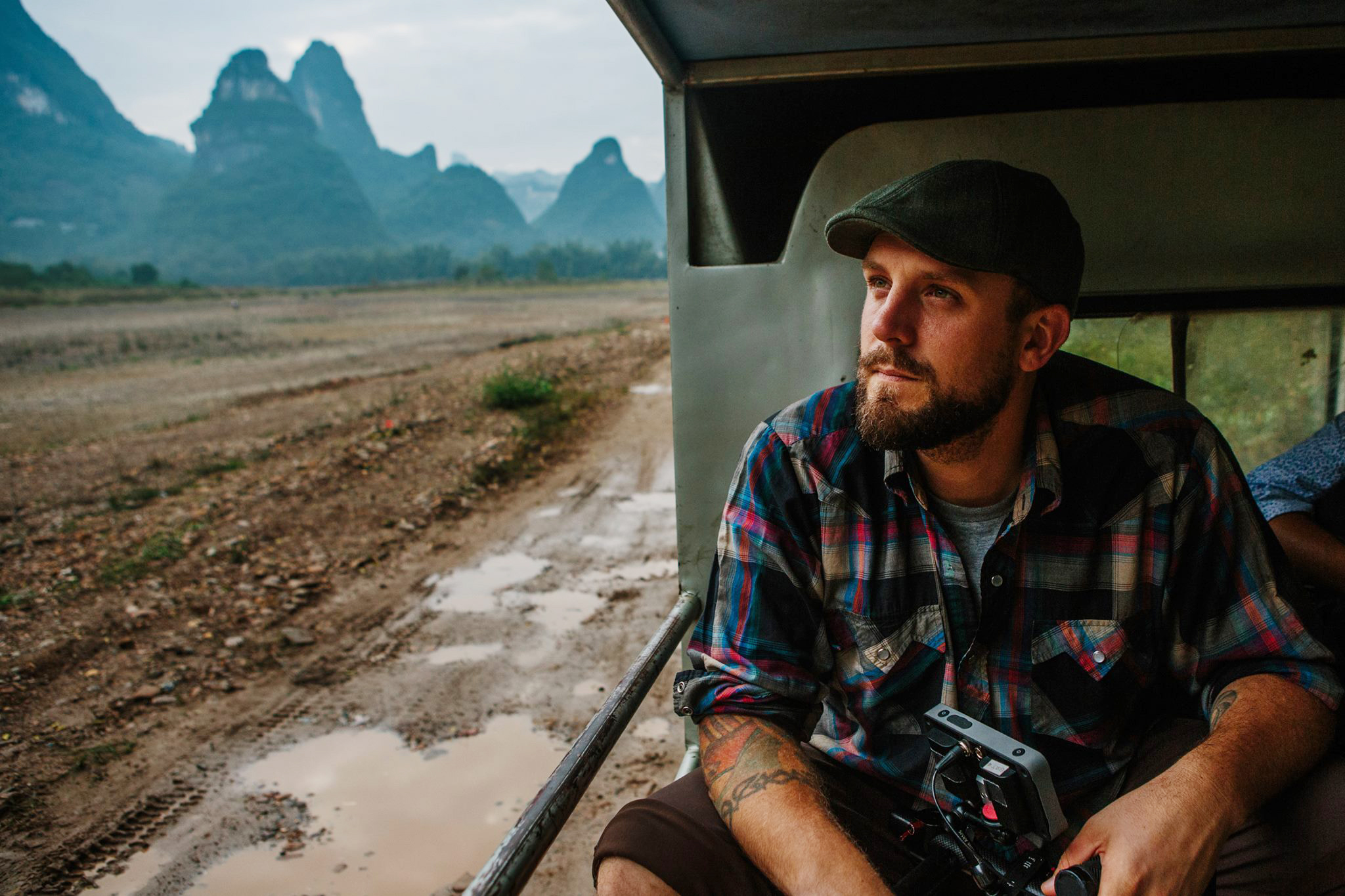
- Born: 10 January 1982 (age 44); Ontario, Canada
- Occupations: Film director; photojournalist

Brent Foster (born 10 January 1982) is a Canadian commercial and documentary film director best known for bringing out authentic performances on screen—often casting everyday people as the subjects of his films. His project While I'm Here, a collection of individual global stories following everyday heroes, has gone viral on several platforms and earned Foster wide recognition and success.

== Career ==
Foster, inspired by the documentary-style photos in his local newspaper, began his career as a photojournalist. He was interested in using photography as a tool for storytelling, and this passion led him to explore the world. His job allowed him to experience more than 45 countries, working for editorial clients such as The New York Times, Time, and Canadian Geographic.

While working as a photojournalist for the Los Angeles Times, Foster learned how to create authentic content and help subjects to quickly become comfortable in front of the camera. Additionally, the editorial world allowed Foster to recognize the significance of telling stories through cinematic work—this led him to a career shift into filmmaking.

Foster has since acted as Director on projects for global brands such as Nike, Huawei, DJI, and Gatorade to help them create authentic pieces of content that resonate with viewers. He is represented by Scouts Honour.

In 2009, Foster worked with The New York Times to film an interview with the Dalai Lama. In the piece, Times reporter Edward Wong and the Dalai Lama discuss the survival of Tibetan culture and relations with China.

Foster created a short piece for DJI in 2016 called The Last Colonizer. The film focuses on Heraldo Riel, an older man who continues the family tradition of working as a gaucho in remote Patagonia even as the world changes rapidly around him.

In 2018, Foster travelled to Kenya to tell the story of a group of elderly women fending off assaults in Korogocho, a slum located in Nairobi. The project ENOUGH, The Empowered Women of Korogocho was Staff Picked by Vimeo and shortlisted for the Young Director's Awards in Cannes, France. It was featured along with an interview with Foster in National Geographic.

=== While I'm Here | The Legacy Project ===
While I'm Here | The Legacy Project profiles everyday heroes passing on a legacy. Foster was inspired to create the videos after missing his chance to tell the story of a man from his hometown who dedicated his life to helping others. He wanted to share the stories of others who exemplified kindness and passed on important messages and traditions while those people were still living and continuing to do those incredible things.

Foster filmed each story with a nimble crew. Their aim was to keep their subjects comfortable instead overwhelming them - since these people aren't generally in the spotlight, it is essential to establish a relationship before beginning to shoot. Subjects featured include a 30-year-old Navy veteran, the "San Diego Highwayman," and an 83-year-old Mississippi bluesman.

The project has picked up Vimeo Staff Picks and multiple awards along the way and has been featured in several viral Facebook posts.

== Recognition ==
Foster has received multiple awards for his works:

- New Director of the Year, Silver, Shots Awards (2018)
- Young Directors Awards, Shortlist, YDAs, Cannes, France (2018)
- News Photographers Association of Canada, Team Multimedia (2nd place, 2017)
- Winner of Best Documentary, Lucent Film Festival (2016)
- Winner of Best Short Film, Lucent Film Festival (2016)
- News Photographers Association of Canada, Team Multimedia for While I'm Here | The Legacy Project (1st place, 2016)
- News Photographers Association of Canada Pictures of the Year, Team Multimedia (1st place, 2015)
- Digital EMMY Award, Cannes France, Team Collaborator, HIGHRISE, National Film Board of Canada (2010)
- Magnum Expression Award (Finalist, 2009)
- News Photographers Association of Canada Pictures of the Year (3rd Place, 2009)
- National Press Photographers Association Best of Photojournalism (2nd and 3rd place, 2009)
- News Photographers Association of Canada, Photojournalist of the Year (Nominee, 2009) *Photographer of the Year, Loyalist College (2001 and 2002)

Additionally, Foster's films have been featured in the following festivals:

- National Geographic Short Film Showcase (2018)
- Berlin Fashion Film Festival (2017)
- Crossroads Film Festival (2016)
- Telluride Film Festival (2016)
- Forest City Film Fest (2016)
- CIMM Music Fest Chicago (2015)
- Lucent Film Fest (2015)
- America's Finest Film Festival (2015)
