= Theatre-By-the-Sea =

- U.S. National Register of Historic Places
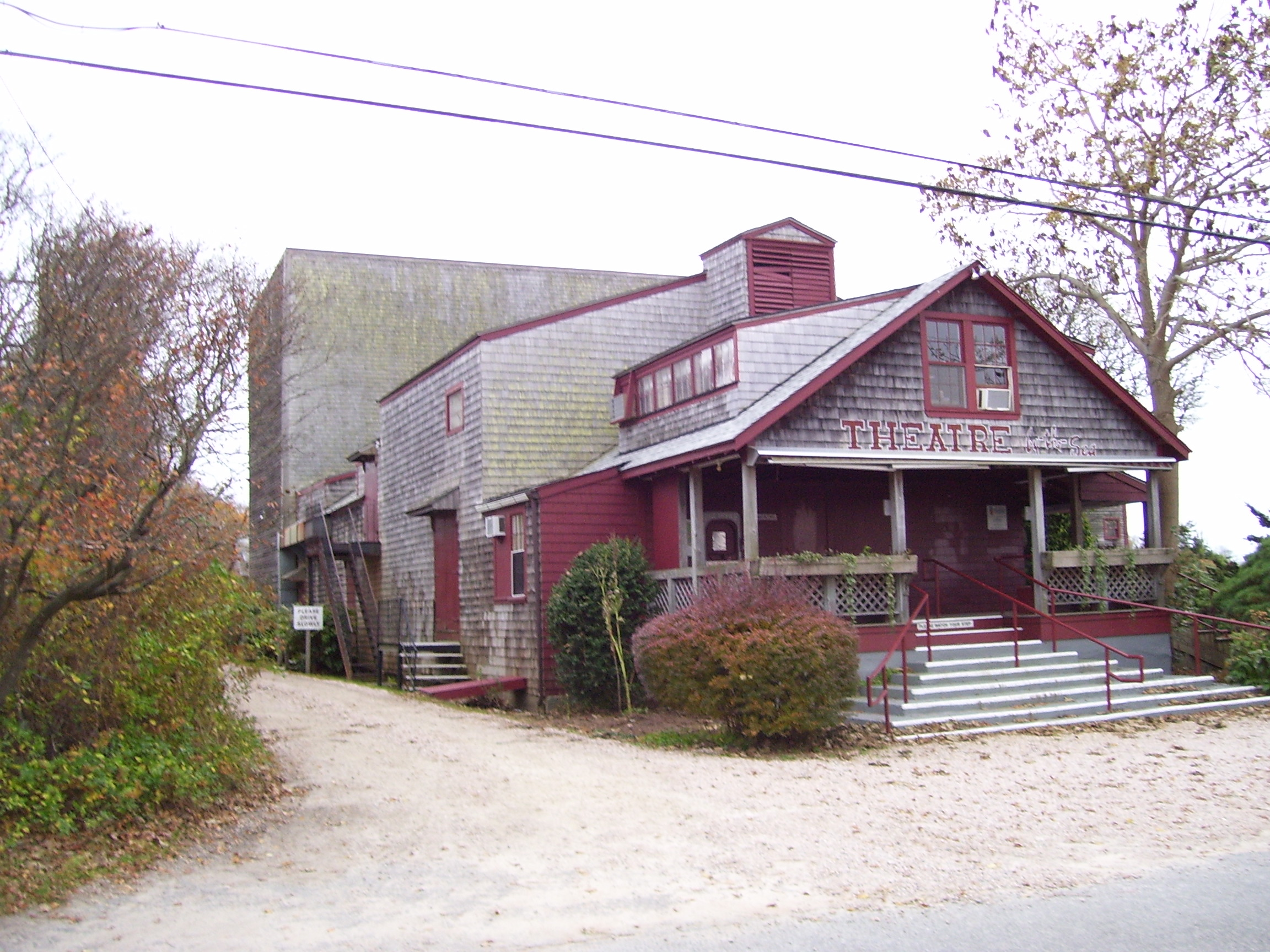
- Theatre in 2008

- Location within Rhode Island Location within the United States
- Location: South Kingstown, Rhode Island
- Coordinates: 41°22′38″N 71°33′46″W
- Built: 1933
- NRHP reference No.: 80004597
- Added to NRHP: July 10, 1980

Theatre-By-the-Sea is a historic theater and playhouse at Cards Pond Road in South Kingstown, Rhode Island. It was added to the National Register of Historic Places in 1980.

== History ==
Theatre By The Sea has had many incarnations over the years. Between 1928 and 1933, Mrs. Alice Jaynes Tyler ran a camp for girls on the property of her summer home. The Great Depression quickly limited the market for summer camps, so she decided to create jobs by turning the old shingled barn into a theater. She teamed up with Russian defector and actor Leo Bulgakoff, producer Leslie Spiller, and lighting designer Abe Feder, and the 300-seat theater came to life on August 7, 1933.

The next 35 years brought numerous changes. On September 21, 1938, the New England Hurricane of 1938 caused extensive damage which led to the first major alterations. The theater was cut in half with a hand saw, the box office was pulled forward by a dump truck, and a new section of theater and a balcony were added. During World War II, the theater sat mostly unused, but it did became a target for military planes to practice their diving maneuvers, and it sporadically played as a movie house. By 1947, Theatre by the Sea was again in full swing and entered into a long and fruitful stretch that lasted for almost 10 years. Famous stars that played there include Marlon Brando, Carol Channing, Groucho Marx, Tallulah Bankhead, Mae West, Judy Holiday, Shelley Winters, and many others. The theater closed in 1963 after the death of Mrs. Tyler in 1951 and Hurricane Carol in 1954, leaving its future uncertain.

In 1967, press agent and producer Tommy Brent saved the theater from demolition by mere hours. He was able to run it for 22 years, but the property was in serious need of repair and renovation. The entertainment company FourQuest took over in 1988 and became the third owner of the property. They made extensive renovations that fall and winter, then reopened the theater in the spring of 1989 and continued until the fall of 2003. The theater closed again until Massachusetts businessman and movie theater owner William Hanney purchased the property, hoping to continue the tradition of theater at this historic Rhode Island landmark. Since Hanney's acquisition, it has been billed as "Bill Hanney's Theatre by the Sea". From 2007 to 2012, shows at Theatre by the Sea were produced by the Ocean State Theatre Company. In 2013, Hanney and the production company Matunuck Live Theatre assumed production responsibilities.

== See also ==
- National Register of Historic Places listings in Washington County, Rhode Island
