= Amy Johnston (dentist) =

New Zealand dentist

Amy Isabella Johnston (5 April 1872–17 September 1908) was a New Zealand dentist and one of the first women in the country to qualify in dentistry.

== Early life ==
Johnston was born in Greymouth, West Coast, New Zealand on 5 April 1872. She attended Greymouth High School.

== Career ==
Johnston was apprenticed to a dentist in Blenheim, J.F. Wilson in 1893. She passed her dentistry qualifications and was registered in 1896. She was either the second or third woman in New Zealand to qualify and was one of five registered female dentists at that time.

She worked with Wilson in Invercargill for about two years but in 1898 bought out Wilson's practice in Blenheim, making it likely that she was the first woman to own a dental practice. In 1900 she returned to Invercargill and the following year declared herself voluntarily bankrupt as creditors were concerned she had left her business. She continued to practice in Blenheim and Invercargill until 1908 when she died in Invercargill.
