= San Diego Highwayman =

Thomas Weller
- Born: December 25, 1947 (age 78)
- Years active: 1966-2017

Thomas Weller (born December 25, 1947), a.k.a. the San Diego Highwayman, is an American mechanic and nationally recognized Good Samaritan. His Highwayman moniker originated from a 1996 segment by CBS reporter Charles Kuralt.

== History ==
Weller began helping stranded motorists in 1966, two years after his car plowed into a snowbank in Illinois. A man saved Weller's life by pulling him out and asked Weller to pass on the favor as payment.

In April 2002, Autotrader.com arranged for Weller's fuel costs to be paid, but the coverage ended 17 months later due to budget cuts.

Weller was featured on the front page of the Los Angeles Times on July 24, 2008.

Weller's modified 1955 Ford station wagon, Beulah, is notable for its significant resemblance to the Ghostbusters vehicle Ecto-1. On August 10, 2011, Beulah was totaled in a freeway accident. Weller could not afford to repair the station wagon, but in December 2014, a dedicated GoFundMe campaign raised over $10,000 to cover the cost.

In March 2017, Weller suffered a minor stroke that partially paralyzed his left side. While still committed to helping those he encounters, he decided to end his regular freeway patrols.
