= Brent Hefford =

New Zealand cricketer (born 1978)

Brent Edward Hefford (born 8 May 1978) is a New Zealand cricketer who plays for the Central Districts Stags in the State Championship and in the State Shield. He also plays for Marlborough in the Hawke Cup competition. He was born in Blenheim.
