= Brent A. Barlow =

American academic

- Education: Brigham Young University (BS, MA); Florida State University (PhD)
- Occupation: Professor (Retired)
- Employer: Brigham Young University
- Spouse: Susan Barlow
- Children: 7

Brent A. Barlow is a former professor of marriage, family and human development at Brigham Young University (BYU). He is now retired. He has written several articles and books on topics related to marriage and family.

== Publications ==
Books by Barlow include Just for Newlyweds, Twelve Traps in Today's marriages and how to Avoid Them, What Husbands Expect of Wives, Worth Waiting For: Sexual Abstinence Before Marriage and What Wives Expect of Husbands. He has also written articles on such topics on inter-faith marriage by Mormons.

He wrote the article "The Irish Experience" in V. Ben Bloxham, et al., ed., Truth Will Prevail: The Rise of The Church of Jesus Christ of Latter-day Saints in the British Isles, 1837-1987 (Cambridge University Press, 1987).

== Religious affiliation ==
Barlow is a member of the Church of Jesus Christ of Latter-day Saints.

== Academic career ==
Barlow has also served as chairman of the Governor's Commission on Marriage in Utah.

== Education ==
Barlow received a BS in Psychology from Brigham Young University in 1966 and an MA in Religious Education in 1968. He earned his Ph.D. in Marriage and Family Relations from Florida State University in 1971. Prior to joining the BYU faculty, Barlow taught at Southern Illinois University and the University of Wisconsin–Stout.

Barlow's masters thesis was on the history of the Church of Jesus Christ of Latter-day Saints in Ireland from 1840 on.

== Selected speeches ==
- "Marriage: Ordained of God" – Devotional address given at Brigham Young University on November 4, 2003

== Personal life ==
Barlow and his wife, Susan, served a CES mission in Minneapolis, Minnesota, after his retirement from BYU in 2008.
