= Brent Frohoff =

American beach volleyball player

Personal information
- Nickname: Fro
- Nationality: American
- Born: May 10, 1963 (age 63); Hermosa Beach, California
- Height: 6 ft 3 in (191 cm)
- Education: Loyola Marymount University

Brent Frohoff (born May 10, 1963, in Hermosa Beach, California) is a retired American professional beach volleyball player. Between 1983 and 2009, Frohoff played in 317 professional tournaments (4th all-time), of which he won 19.

Frohoff partnered with legendary volleyball player Karch Kiraly in 1989 and 1990. In his career, he won just over $1,000,000 in prizes.
