= Ray Webster (businessman) =

New Zealand aviation executive (1946–2026)

Ray Webster FRAeS
- Born: Raymond Douglas Webster; 9 July 1946; Greymouth, New Zealand
- Died: 14 February 2026 (aged 79); Abbey Road, London, England
- Resting place: St. Marylebone Crematorium
- Education: Greymouth High School
- Alma mater: University of Canterbury; Cranfield Institute of Technology; Stanford Graduate School of Business
- Occupation: Aviation executive
- Known for: First managing director of easyJet

Raymond Douglas Webster (9 July 1946 – 14 February 2026) was a New Zealand aviation executive who was the first managing director, and then first chief executive, of easyJet, a British based low-cost airline.

== Early life ==
Raymond Douglas Webster was born on 9 July 1946 in Greymouth, on the west coast of New Zealand's South Island. His parents were Fred and Sybil Webster, his father was a carpenter. He attended Greymouth High School, where he did not fare well academically, but developed an interest in electronics. His first job was working in Robert Francis' radio repair shop in MacKay Street, next to the Greymouth Evening Star building.

== Start of aviation career ==
In 1965 he began an apprenticeship with New Zealand National Airways Corporation (NAC) at Christchurch Airport. NAC was New Zealand's main domestic airline, maintaining business alliances with longhaul airlines such as Air New Zealand and British Airways. NAC sponsored his engineering degree from the University of Canterbury. In 1976 he completed an MSc in Air Transport Engineering at Cranfield Institute of Technology in England, now known as Cranfield University; by 1977 he was NAC's chief engineer. The following year NAC was merged into Air New Zealand (ANZ), with the restructured airline operating domestic and international services.

Webster continued his career with Air New Zealand, and the airline supported his postgraduate management studies at Stanford Graduate School of Business in California in 1987-1988. In 1990 he became head of ANZ's operations in the Americas, based in Los Angeles. In 1992 he returned to Auckland, New Zealand, as general manager of strategic planning, to prepare ANZ for a proposed "open skies" agreement, known as One Sky, which was under negotiation between the New Zealand and Australian governments. ANZ had ambitious plans to extend operations into Australia's domestic network. But Webster's efforts to establish a low-cost carrier subsidiary, modelled on South West Airlines in the United States, were unsuccessful. In October 1994 the Australian government cancelled the draft agreement at a late stage, after lobbying from Qantas, the largest Australian airline, and its political supporters.

== Career at easyJet ==
In January 1996 Webster heard that Stelios Haji-Ioannou had started a new low-cost airline, easyJet, in the United Kingdom, and was looking for a managing director. EasyJet had recently agreed access terms for aviation operators' licences, in wet-lease arrangements with other airlines, and from 1995 was running services between Luton Airport and two Scottish destinations, Glasgow and Edinburgh. After a brief interview, Haji-Ioannou appointed Webster to the managing director role from March 1996. When the airline was partly floated on the London Stock Exchange in 2000, Webster's role became that of chief executive of easyJet plc.

Webster steered the airline over the following nine years, from obtaining easyJet's own air operator's licence in 1997, to becoming one of Europe's largest airlines by 2005, with over 100 aircraft serving 203 routes within Europe. His considerable operational experience of aviation gave him a particular role to keep the airline flying, while the more flamboyant style of Haji-Ioannou, the airline's biggest shareholder, lent itself to publicity stunts and bold orange advertising. Webster's background in engineering and interest in information technology led to easyJet taking an internet based sales model closer to Amazon than that of legacy airlines. In 2002 Webster negotiated easyJet's purchase of Go, another British low-cost airline, originally set up by British Airways.

Haji-Ioannou was in constant battle with his own board, resigning as chairman in 2002. Webster announced his own resignation from easyJet in May 2005, with effect from November 2005. He said that his nine year tenure was the highlight of his career, but that it had come at "some personal costs." Webster expressed the wish to spend more time with his family, stating: "My job is done here."

== Later life and death ==
After retiring from easyJet Webster took on some non-executive board directorship. He joined Kuoni Travel, a Zurich based travel company, as a director from May 2006 until April 2015. He became a board member for Pegasus Airlines until April 2014. He wrote book reviews for management journals. He was a fellow of the Royal Aeronautical Society and a member of the Institution of Electrical Engineers. His other interests included skiing and car ownership.

In 2021 Webster was diagnosed with Alzheimer's disease. He moved to a London nursing home in late 2023, where he died on 14 February 2026, at the age of 79. Shortly after his death, easyJet expressed its sadness, noting that he guided the airline's operations during a period of growth and established easyJet's structure that remains in place: "Ray's legacy will remain an important part of our story." He is survived by his French second wife, management consultant Brigitte Piroulas-Webster, who he met while they were both studying at Stanford in 1987. He had two daughters from his first marriage.
