= Brent Clayton =

Australian firefighter

- Born: March 3, 1984 (age 42)
- Occupations: firefighter, entrepreneur, author
- Known for: Fire Recruitment Australia

Brent Clayton (born March 3, 1984) is an Australian firefighter, entrepreneur, author, public speaker, social commentator, and former soldier based in Australia. He is the founder of Fire Recruitment Australia.

== Career ==
Clayton began his career as a military soldier and later became a prison guard before moving into the emergency management sector. In 2001, while he is 20, he started in the online business space. He has been working as a professional firefighter since 2007. Clayton worked as a Firefighter Recruit Instructor and in 2009, he founded Fire Recruitment Australia, a training company that specializes in firefighting recruitment, firefighting operations, emergency management and online business strategy.

Clayton appeared in a 1980s TV show remake, It’s a Knockout, to form the Australian firefighters' team in channel 10's 2012 return of the show. As of 2020, Clayton works as a Senior Station Officer in Australia.

== Published works ==
Clayton has published several books including:

- Fire service recruitment – The Process To Success [ISBN 9781105971648]
- Fire Service Aptitude Guide [ISBN 9781387175482]
- Pass The Beep Test [ISBN 9781300024101]
