= Brent Fultz =

American materials scientist

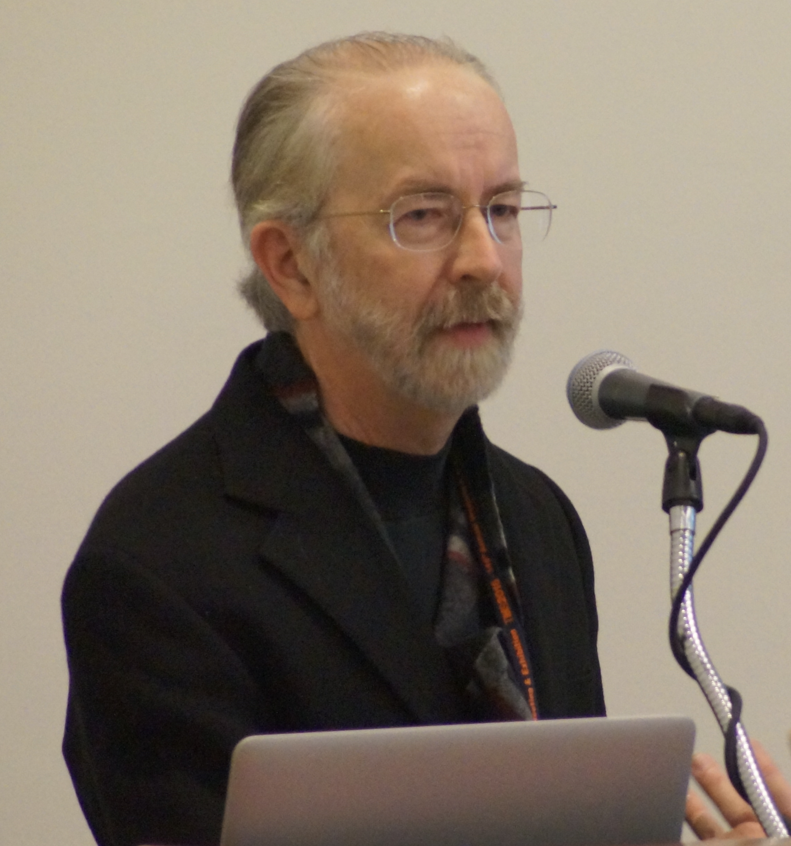
- Brent Fultz presenting at the William Hume-Rothery Award Lecture
- Education: University of California, Berkeley (Ph.D., 1982); Massachusetts Institute of Technology (B.Sc., 1975)
- Scientific career
- Fields: Materials Science; Applied physics Statistical Mechanics
- Workplaces: California Institute of Technology
- Doctoral advisor: John. W. Morris

Brent Fultz is an American physicist and materials scientist and one of the world's leading authorities on statistical mechanics, diffraction, and phase transitions in materials. Fultz is the Barbara and Stanley Rawn Jr. Professor of Applied Physics and Materials Science at the California Institute of Technology. He is known for his research in materials physics and materials chemistry, and for establishing the importance of phonon entropy to the phase stability of materials. Additionally, Fultz oversaw the construction of the wide angular-range chopper spectrometer (ARCS) instrument at the Spallation Neutron Source and has made advances in phonon measuring techniques.

He is the author of two graduate level textbooks, Transmission Electron Microscopy and Diffractometry of Materials (with James M. Howe, Springer, 2001; 4th ed., 2013) on diffractometry of materials, and Phase Transitions in Materials (Cambridge University Press, 2014) on phase transitions in materials.

== Early life and career ==
Brent Fultz completed his undergraduate studies in physics at MIT in 1975, before earning his doctorate in engineering science from the University of California, Berkeley in 1982 where he studied under the advisement of John William Morris. His early career was marked by his designation as a Presidential Young Investigator and his receipt of the IBM Faculty Development Award and a Jacob Wallenberg Scholarship. Fultz then worked as a scientist at Lawrence Berkeley Laboratory before becoming a professor of materials science at the California Institute of Technology (Caltech) in 1985.

Fultz's academic contributions were acknowledged through multiple recognitions, such as the TMS EMPMD Distinguished Scientist Award in 2010 and the William Hume-Rothery Award from TMS in 2016. His work in the field of neutron scattering also earned him a fellowship from the Neutron Scattering Society of America in 2016. His accomplishments further include membership in the Society of Sigma Xi in 2017, a fellowship from the American Physical Society in 2017, a fellowship from TMS in 2018, and recognition as an "Outstanding Referee" by the American Physical Society in 2019.

He has played an advisory role for the Advanced Photon Source and the Spallation Neutron Source. His expertise in material sciences also led to consulting roles with Everett Charles Technologies, the Defense Science Board, and for firms like Actium Materials, Contour Energy, and the Materials Project. He has written or co-authored close to 400 papers.

In collaboration with his colleague, Prof. J. Howe from the University of Virginia, Fultz produced an advanced textbook on the subject of material diffraction and microscopy, which has now seen four editions in English and one in Russian, with a Chinese translation in progress. More recently, Fultz developed a graduate-level textbook on material phase transitions, which integrates ideas from both traditional material sciences and condensed-matter physics.

== Research ==
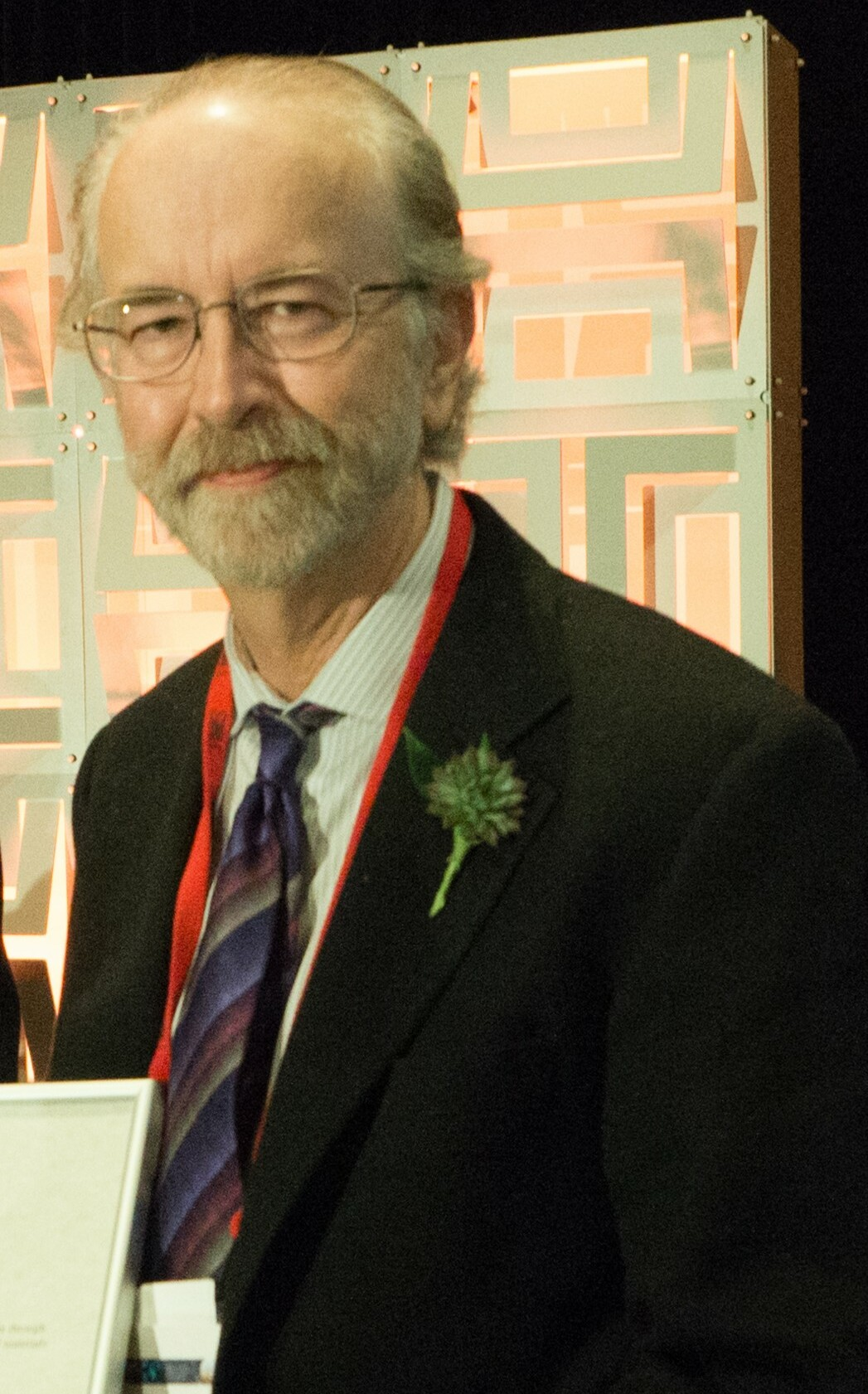
Brent Fultz at the TMS-AIME Awards Ceremony

Brent Fultz's research delves into understanding the behavior of atoms within solids, particularly how their vibrations, or phonons, influence the entropy and free energy of materials. He employs inelastic neutron scattering techniques to examine these atomic vibrations, which are a primary source of entropy in solids. The thermodynamic significance of magnetic and electronic excitations within solids, which are also detected by this method, forms another aspect of his study. His recent work emphasizes the interactions between phonons and electronic excitations across a wide range of temperatures, and how the entropy changes with varying temperature and pressure conditions.

Modern computational methods, specifically density functional theory, play a key role in Fultz's research on phonons and electrons in solids. His team uses ab initio molecular dynamics to computationally investigate phonons and electron excitations at high temperatures. In addition, they use high-resolution inelastic x-ray scattering to examine how vibrational thermodynamics change under high pressures, as might be experienced in a diamond anvil cell.

Fultz's work also addresses the pressing global energy problem. His team is researching materials capable of storing lithium (used in rechargeable batteries) and hydrogen. They aim to understand how hydrogen molecules interact with surfaces and how new materials can optimize hydrogen storage. Furthermore, they are exploring the potential of using nuclear resonant scattering to study atomic distortions in materials as an electron moves between adjacent ions under pressure. Fultz's work (which often leans more towards quantum mechanics than classical mechanics, and statistical mechanics over classical thermodynamics) focuses on the position of atoms, especially in disordered materials, and how atoms vibrate or transfer electrons during bonding.

Fultz's team broke new ground by investigating the entropy of materials, specifically how variances in crystal structure, chemical composition, or local atomic arrangements might impact the vibrational spectrum and, in turn, the entropy. Over time, this research led to a recognition that such details of vibrational entropy significantly influence the thermodynamic stability of materials. Fultz's team also undertakes numerous experiments at national facilities providing high-intensity x-ray or neutron beams. This has led to collaborations with scientists from these national neutron sources. A notable accomplishment in this area was Fultz's leadership in building a cutting-edge neutron scattering instrument, the wide angular-range chopper spectrometer (ARCS) instrument at the Spallation Neutron Source. Along with this came the opportunity for novel scientific computing projects, such as the Distributed Data Analysis for Neutron Scattering Experiments (DANSE) initiative.

== Awards ==
- 2010 TMS Electronic, Magnetic & Photonic Materials Division (EMPMD) Distinguished Scientist/Engineer Award
- 2016 TMS William Hume-Rothery Award
- 2016 Neutron Scattering Society of America Fellow
- 2017 American Physical Society Fellow
- 2018 TMS Fellow
- 2019 Outstanding Referee of Physical Review journals
