= Brent Hesselyn =

New Zealand potter and sculptor

Brent Hesselyn (5 December 1950 – 1 September 2002) was a New Zealand potter and sculptor who lived and worked in Indonesia.

== Education ==
Brent Hesselyn was born at St George's Hospital in Christchurch, New Zealand to Esme and George (Bill) Hesselyn. Hesselyn attended Greymouth High School in the late 1960s. Yvonne Rust was the art teacher at the school and with the help of Barry Brickell, she established a pottery workshop in an old brewery near Greymouth. Hesselyn, along with others, built a coal-fired kiln there. He was accepted into Ilam School of Fine Arts in Christchurch in 1969 where he studied sculpture.

== Establishment of potteries in Indonesia ==
Hesselyn left Ilam and New Zealand in 1973 and went to Sydney where he lived with Theo Schoon in Coogee. Schoon inspired Hesselyn to emigrate to Bali and establish a pottery workshop there. He would go first to Darwin, then to Timor, and on to Bali.

Arriving in Bali, Hesselyn pursued his interest in photography. He met Kay It, a Balinese painter of Chinese descent, who was making decorative terracotta tiles and clay figures. Hesselyn worked in the Tabanan Regency and visited Java to source equipment and materials so he could construct an oil-fired down-draft kiln in its back yard.

In 1975, Hesselyn assisted Anak Agung Nagurah Oka to establish the Jati Agung Pottery in Kapal.

A wealthy hotel owner, Wija Waworuntu, who was interested in ceramic art and an art collector, became Hesselyn's patron. Together, in 1976, they established Jenggala Keramik, which is a pottery studio producing home décor items, tableware and unique art pieces and is a leading manufacturer of ceramic ware in Indonesia.

Schoon's return to Bali in 1977 further encouraged Hesselyn's interest in traditional Balinese design.

== Death and legacy ==
On 1 September 2002, Hesselyn went missing while diving off Nusa Lembongan.

The Museum of New Zealand Te Papa Tongarewa in Wellington in New Zealand holds a series of lecture notes and notebooks created by Hesselyn between November 1972 and April 1973 relating to Indonesian subject matter. They also provide an insight into what Schoon was trying to achieve in his works in the 1970s.
