= Brent Bokovoy =

American filmmaker

- Occupation: Filmmaker
- Years active: 2011–present
- Known for: Monster in My Swimming Pool; Ronald's Little Factory

Brent Bokovoy is an American filmmaker and screenwriter who wrote, directed, and produced the Mormonsploitation film Ronald's Little Factory (2023) and the short horror film Monster in My Swimming Pool (2011), which won Universal's Halloween Horror Nights Short Film Competition in 2011.

== Personal life ==
Bokovoy is a former Mormon from Utah and San Diego.

== Career ==
In 2011, Bokovoy directed the horror short Monster in My Swimming Pool starring Lia Marie Johnson. Bokovoy won Universal's Halloween Horror Nights Short Film Competition, and the film was screened during the Eyegore Awards at Universal Studios Hollywood. JoBlo.com described it as "curiously cute". KPBS arts reporter Beth Accomando wrote that the film was "smartly shot". In 2025, Bokovoy directed the mockumentary short Deathline – The Juicy Hidden Truth Behind the Killer Tomatoes, a tribute to the cult film Attack of the Killer Tomatoes.

=== Ronald's Little Factory ===
Bokovoy wrote and directed Ronald's Little Factory, a 2023 Post Mormon dark comedy film set in the 1970s within the culture of the Church of Jesus Christ of Latter-day Saints, and based on a 1976 anti-masturbation sermon by Boyd K. Packer. His use of a late-1980s horror aesthetic and the challenges of expanding the premise into a feature-length film were discussed in the Salt Lake City Weekly. Bokovoy made the film during the COVID-19 pandemic. The film screened at Megaplex Theatres and Brewvies Cinema Pub in Utah and Kevin Smith's Smodcastle Film Festival in New Jersey.

In a 2024 essay about contemporary Mormon cinema for the Association for Mormon Letters, film scholar Randy Astle examined Ronald's Little Factory alongside the films Heretic and Plan 10 from Outer Space. He conferred on the film's exaggerated performances, its throwback setting, and its theology on sexuality. Bokovoy released the first 25 minutes of the film on the Mormonish Podcast in 2025.

== Filmography ==
Year	Title	Director	Writer	Producer
2011	Monster in My Swimming Pool	Yes	Yes	Yes
2023	Ronald's Little Factory	Yes	Yes	Yes

== Accolades ==
Festival / Event	Year	Title	Award	Result	Ref.
Halloween Horror Nights Short Film Competition	2011	Monster in My Swimming Pool	Eyegore Award	Won	
Idyllwild International Festival of Cinema	2023	Ronald's Little Factory	Indie Spirit Award	Won	
Idyllwild International Festival of Cinema	2023	Ronald's Little Factory	Festival Director's Choice Award	Won	
