= Brent Barraclough =

Canadian musician (born 1962)

- Born: 1962 (age 63–64)
- Occupations: Classical pianist, film producer
- Instrument: Classical piano
- Website: https://www.brentbarraclough.com/

Brent Barraclough is a classical pianist and film producer who was born in Canada in 1962 and is of British citizenship. He studied piano at the Juilliard School (New York) and McGill University (Montreal). His principal piano teachers were Ruth Laredo, "America's First Lady of the Piano" and Thomas C. Plaunt. He also studied business and philosophy at New York University, University of Toronto, and Sauder School of Business (University of British Columbia).

He is known for his work as actor and producer in both The French Guy and 2 Days Later with Jools Holland. He was a national Director of The Drake Music Project and Chief Executive of "Live Music Now!" in London, England. He was also host of the Shaw Cable TV show Noteworthy in the early 1980s.

He was elected as a Fellow of the Royal Society of Arts (UK) in 2001.

He is a member of The American Bach Society.

In 2012 he served on the Hnatyshyn Foundation Piano Jury with Anton Kuerti and Louise Bissette.
