= Brent Robbins =

American psychologist (1970–2026)

Brent Dean Robbins (August 18, 1970 – April 28, 2026) was an American psychologist and academic who was an associate professor of psychology at Point Park University in Pittsburgh, Pennsylvania. His areas of research included grief, humor, self-consciousness, spirituality/religion, death anxiety, and the medicalization of the body. He was editor-in-chief and founder of Janus Head: Journal of Interdisciplinary Studies in Literature, Continental Philosophy, Phenomenological Psychology, and the Arts, and was a board member for a number of journals, including International Journal of Transpersonal Studies, the International Journal of Existential Psychology and Psychotherapy, PsyCRITIQUES, and Terrorism Research. Robbins was a co-editor of The Legacy of R.D. Laing, published by Trivium Press. Robbins was a recipient of the Harmi Carari Early Career Award, from the Society for Humanistic Psychology. He held a doctorate in clinical psychology from Duquesne University.

In 2011, Robbins co-authored an open letter from the Society for Humanistic Psychology regarding the Diagnostic and Statistical Manual of Mental Disorders's fifth edition, the DSM-5. The letter was endorsed by thirteen other American Psychological Association divisions, and was signed as a petition by over 15,000 people. In a recent San Francisco Chronicle article about the debate over the DSM-5, Robbins noted that, under the new guidelines, certain responses to grief could be labeled as pathological disorders, instead of being recognized as being normal human experiences.

Robbins was born into a nominally Catholic family, became an atheist when in college, and then he reverted to the Catholic faith after experienced something in a retreat.

Robbins died on April 28, 2026, at the age of 55.

== Selected works ==
- Drugging Our Children: How Profiteers are Pushing Antipsychotics on Our Youngest and What We Can Do to Stop It with Sharna Olfman, Ph.D., 2012.
- Co-author of "A cultural-existential approach to therapy: Merleau-Ponty's phenomenology of embodiment and its implications for practice," (with co-author Felder, A.J.) Theory and Psychology, 2011.
- "Conflicts of interest in research on antipsychotic treatment of pediatric bipolar disorder, temper dysregulation disorder, and attenuated psychotic symptoms syndrome: Exploring the unholy alliance between big pharma and psychiatry," (with Point Park students/co-authors Higgins, M.; Fischer, M.; and Over, K.) Journal of Psychological Issues in Organizational Culture, 2011.
- Co-author of "Resiliency as a virtue: Contributions from humanistic and positive psychology," Continuity versus creative response to challenge: The primacy of resilience and resourcefulness in life and therapy, 2011.
- "Joy," The Encyclopedia of Positive Psychology, 2009.
- "The self-regulation of humor expression: A mixed method, phenomenological approach to the study of suppressed laughter," (Co-authored with Kyla Vandree), and "What is the good life? Positive psychology and the renaissance of humanistic psychology," The Humanistic Psychologist, 2009 and 2008.
- "Lessons from the dead: Undergraduate experiences of work with cadavers," (Co-authored with A. Tomaka, C. Innus, J. Patterson, & G. Styn). Omega: Journal of Death and Dying, 2008.
