= Theodore Brent =

American businessman (1874–1953)

Theodore Brent (30 March 1874–9 June 1953) was an American shipping magistrate in New Orleans and a commissioner of the United States Shipping Board.

Brent was born on 30 March 1874 in Muscatine, Iowa, and attended the local grammar school. After dropping out of the seventh grade, he worked as a railroad stenographer. By 1914, he was an assistant to the Chicago River and Indiana Railroad's president after working for several railroads in the Midwest. That year, he resigned and moved to New Orleans to become the general manager of the New Orleans Joint Traffic Bureau. He was appointed as a commissioner of the newly formed United States Shipping Board in 1917 by President Woodrow Wilson; the arrangement did not last, as Brent resigned in less than six months. Concurrently, he was involved in the establishment of several shipping companies in New Orleans and later became their leaders. He was general manager of Federal Barge Lines between 1920 and 1927, and was presidents of Redwood Steamship Line between 1928 and 1931, Coast Transportation Company between 1932 and 1943, and Delta Line between 1943 and 1953. On 9 June 1953, he died in New Orleans after a months-long sickness.
