= Brent Roe =

Canadian artist (born 1956)

- Born: 1956 (age 69–70); Oshawa, Ontario
- Education: York University, Toronto, BFA (1976–1980), MFA (1983)
- Awards: Canada Council grants (1982–1996); Ontario Arts Council grant (1985); Royal Bank of Canada awards (1979–1980)

Brent Roe (born 1956) is an artist who uses words and sentence fragments in his paintings to challenge aesthetic and philosophical ideas.

== Career ==
Brent Roe was born in Oshawa, Ontario. He graduated from York University in Toronto with his Masters in Fine Art in 1983. His doodle and cartoon-like paintings received comment in the Toronto Star for their social comment in 1984. In 1985, the Robert McLaughlin Gallery in Oshawa held the exhibition The Expanding World of Brent Roe which featured 29 works tracing humankind's relationship (or lack of it) with the natural world as well as Roe's evolution over the previous five years. That same year, Mercer Union in Toronto included him in a collaborative room painting.

Since 1985, Roe has had numerous solo and group exhibitions, notably a 10-year survey of his work titled new things will happen at the Koffler Gallery in Toronto in 1998 and Who Means What - Brent Roe: Paintings 1992-2001 at the Agnes Etherington Art Centre in Kingston in 2002, curated by John Armstong. In 2007, the words "see you tomorrow" in one of his paintings were used as the title of an exhibition at the Agnes Etherington Art Centre about new ways of thinking about landscape.

In 2013, Brent Roe and Scott Cameron (aka Scotch Camera) joined an art show titled "Art Pioneers" with Pockets Warhol, a Capuchin monkey, at the Gladstone hotel in Toronto. In 2015, he participated in the exhibition "Ghost and Echoes" at yumart gallery in Toronto.

Brent Roe lives and works in Toronto.
