= Brent Estabrook =

American artist

Dr Brent Estabrook is an American artist best known for his colorful and textural oil paintings of stuffed animals.

== Education ==
Estabrook completed BSA from the University of Arizona and has a Doctorate of Dental Surgery (DMD) from the University of Louisville.

== Career ==
He creates large-scale oil paintings of stuffed animals, using a technique for mixing and applying paint that is influenced by his doctorate. He builds up a rich impasto that mimics the fibres of velvety fabric, velvet, and fleece with each thick, deeply coloured brushstroke and then he combines the unrestrained delight and curiosity typical of children's play with his painting approach.

== Exhibitions ==
Solo Exhibitions:

- Brent Estabrook: Preview, Maddox Gallery, London, (May-July 2024)
- Storytime, Maddox Gallery, Gstaad, (October-November 2021)

Group Exhibitions:

- Moving Through Colour, Maddox Gallery, London, (November 2024-January 2025)
- Morpheus, Maddox Gallery, London, (December 2023-February 2024)
- Summer Daze, Maddox Gallery, London, (July-September 2023)
