= Brent Holsclaw =

American football coach (born c. 1971)

Biographical details
- Born: c. 1971 (age 54–55); Louisville, Kentucky, U.S.
- Education: Kentucky Wesleyan College (1993); Mercyhurst University (1998)

Playing career
- 1990: Murray State
- 1991–1993: Kentucky Wesleyan
- Position: Quarterback

Coaching career (HC unless noted)
- 1994–1995: Fairdale HS (KY) (OC)
- 1996: Mercyhurst (QB)
- 1997: Mercyhurst (OL)
- 1998–2000: Mercyhurst (OC)
- 2001–2002: Lake Forest (OC)
- 2003–2017: Kentucky Wesleyan
- 2026-: Ohio County HS (KY)

Head coaching record
- Overall: 42–119

Brent Holsclaw (born c. 1971) is an American former college football coach and current high school football coach. He is currently the head football coach at Ohio County High School in Beaver Dam, Kentucky. He was the head football coach for Kentucky Wesleyan College from 2003 to 2017. He also coached for Fairdale High School, Mercyhurst, and Lake Forest. He played college football for Murray State and Kentucky Wesleyan as a quarterback.

== Head coaching record ==
| Year | Team | Overall | Conference | Standing | Bowl/playoffs |
|---|---|---|---|---|---|
Kentucky Wesleyan Panthers (NCAA Division II independent) (2003)
| 2003 | Kentucky Wesleyan | 1–9 | | | |
Kentucky Wesleyan Panthers (Mid-South Conference) (2004–2005)
| 2004 | Kentucky Wesleyan | 4–7 | 4–6 | T–7th | |
| 2005 | Kentucky Wesleyan | 3–7 | 2–3 | T–4th (West) | |
Kentucky Wesleyan Panthers (Great Lakes Football Conference) (2006–2011)
| 2006 | Kentucky Wesleyan | 0–11 | 0–5 | 6th | |
| 2007 | Kentucky Wesleyan | 3–8 | 1–4 | 5th | |
| 2008 | Kentucky Wesleyan | 4–6 | 2–1 | T–2nd | |
| 2009 | Kentucky Wesleyan | 2–9 | 2–2 | 3rd | |
| 2010 | Kentucky Wesleyan | 5–5 | 0–3 | 4th | |
| 2011 | Kentucky Wesleyan | 1–10 | 0–3 | 4th | |
Kentucky Wesleyan Panthers (Great Lakes Valley Conference) (2012–2013)
| 2012 | Kentucky Wesleyan | 2–9 | 0–8 | 9th | |
| 2013 | Kentucky Wesleyan | 0–11 | 0–7 | 8th | |
Kentucky Wesleyan Panthers (NCAA Division II independent) (2014–2015)
| 2014 | Kentucky Wesleyan | 7–4 | | | |
| 2015 | Kentucky Wesleyan | 5–6 | | | |
Kentucky Wesleyan Panthers (Great Midwest Athletic Conference) (2016–2017)
| 2016 | Kentucky Wesleyan | 3–8 | 1–1 | 2nd | |
| 2017 | Kentucky Wesleyan | 2–8 | 1–6 | T–7th | |
| Kentucky Wesleyan: | | 42–119 | 13–49 | | |
| Total: | | 42–119 | | | |
