= Suzi Brent =

British blogger (born 1977)

- Born: 28 April 1977 (age 49); London, England
- Occupations: Novelist, Emergency medical dispatcher
- Writing career
- Language: English
- Genre: Biography
- Notable work: "Nee Naw: Real Life Dispatches From Ambulance Control"

Suzi Brent (born 28 April 1977) is an emergency medical dispatcher for London Ambulance Service and the author of the blog Nee Naw. She lives in London.

== Biography ==
Brent grew up in London. As a child she aspired to be a doctor. In 2004, inspired by a Christmas episode of Casualty (TV series) she successfully applied to become an Emergency Medical Dispatcher for the London Ambulance Service. She took some of the first calls after the 7 July 2005 London bombings.

== Nee Naw ==
Brent's blog Nee Naw featured her reflections on life working within the London Ambulance Service control room. It was originally released under the pseudonym Mark Myers. Brent started writing the blog in 2005. In 2009, it was adapted into a book published by Penguin Group which was released on 4 March 2010. On 7 August 2010 Brent announced that she would no longer be updating Nee Naw.
