= Brent Newton =

American legal scholar

- Born: Brent Evan Newton
- Education: University of North Carolina (B.A.); Columbia Law School (J.D.)
- Occupations: Deputy Staff Director at United States Sentencing Commission; Professor of Law
- Website: Penn State Dickinson Law Biography

Brent Evan Newton is an American legal scholar, the former deputy staff director at the United States Sentencing Commission, and a professor of law at Penn State Dickinson Law, Georgetown University Law Center, and American University Washington College of Law.

Newton graduated from the University of North Carolina at Chapel Hill and Columbia Law School, where he was a James Kent Scholar and a senior editor of the Columbia Law Review. After graduating from law school in 1992, he clerked for Judge Carolyn Dineen King of the U.S. Court of Appeals for the Fifth Circuit. After his clerkship, Newton worked as a public defender in both the state and federal systems. In that role, Newton also represented death row inmates in the American South.

Newton has argued before the United States Supreme Court. In 2008, Newton argued Gonzalez v. United States. In 2010, Newton was elected as a member of the American Law Institute. In 1993, at the age of twenty-five, Newton handled a capital murder appeal to the United States Supreme Court.

== Scholarship ==
=== American legal education ===
In "Preaching What They Don’t Practice: Why Law Faculties’ Preoccupation with Impractical Scholarship and Devaluation of Practical Competencies Obstruct Reform in the Legal Academy," Newton criticizes the legal academy's reliance upon law review articles for tenure consideration, rather than preparing students to practice law.

=== Death penalty ===
Newton has written about the death penalty with particular emphasis on the Texas system in which he practiced for many years. In “Capital Punishment: Texas Could Learn a Lot from Florida" (1998), Newton surmised that Texas's high actual execution numbers could be attributed to three factors at that time: the way judges were elected, a weak public defender system, and a flawed jury system that did not allow for the consideration of mitigating evidence.

=== Law review articles ===
Newton wrote for SCOTUSblog on the value of law review articles for United States Supreme Court justices. According to Newton, about half of all Supreme Court opinions cited at least one law review article in the 1970s and 1980s. Since 2000, however, the rate is" just 37 percent — even as Supreme Court opinions have grown longer and more elaborate."

== Contributions to law reviews ==
- Justice Kennedy, the Purposes of Capital Punishment, and the Future of Lackey Claims, 62 Buff. L. Rev. (2014)
- The Ninety-Five Theses: Systemic Reforms of American Legal Education and Licensure, 64 S.C. L. Rev. (2012)
- Law Review Scholarship in the Eyes of the Twenty-First-Century Supreme Court Justices: An Empirical Analysis, 4 Drexel L. Rev. 399 (2012)
- Preaching What They Don't Practice: Why Law Faculties' Preoccupation with Impractical Scholarship and Devaluation of Practical Competencies Obstruct Reform in the Legal Academy, 62 S.C. L. Rev. 105, 106 (2010)
- Almendarez-Torres and the Anders Ethical Dilemma, 45 Hous. L. Rev. (2008)
- A Case Study in Systemic Unfairness: The Texas Death Penalty, 1973-1994, 1 Tex. F. on C.L. & C.R. 1 (1994)
- The Legal Effect of Government Contractor Teaming Agreements: A Proposal for Determining Liability and Assessing Damages in Event of Breach, 91 Colum. L. Rev. 1990 (1991)

== Contributions to legal journals ==
- The Slow Wheels of Furman's Machinery of Death, 13 J. App. Prac. & Process 41 (2012)
- "How Can You Defend A Person You Know Is Guilty?": Reflections of A Public Defender, 33 Am. J. Trial Advoc. (2009)
- Lopez v. Gonzales: A Window on the Shortcomings of the Federal Appellate Process, 9 J. App. Prac. & Process (2007)
- A Primer on Post-Conviction Habeas Corpus Review, Champion, June 2005
- Applications for Certificates of Appealability and the Supreme Court's "Obligatory" Jurisdiction, 5 J. App. Prac. & Process 177 (2003)
- An Argument for Reviving the Actual Futility Exception to the Supreme Court's Procedural Default Doctrine, 4 J. App. Prac. & Process 521 (2002)
- When Reasonable Jurists Could Disagree: The Fifth Circuit's Misapplication of the Frivolousness Standard, 3 J. App. Prac. & Process (2001)
- Felons, Firearms, and Federalism: Reconsidering Scarborough in Light of Lopez, 3 J. App. Prac. & Process 671 (2001)
- Disarray Among the Federal Circuits: Harmless Error Review of Rule 11 Violations, 2 J. App. Prac. & Process 143 (2000)
- The Antiquated "Slight Evidence Rule" in Federal Conspiracy Cases, 1 J. App. Prac. & Process 49 (1999)
