= Patrick Brent =

American businessman

Patrick Brent at Pearl Harbor Visitor Center USS Arizona Marines Memorial Dedication

Patrick Timothy Brent is an American businessman who was born and raised in Chicago. After his business and entrepreneurial years, Mr. Brent became well known for his journalism and published works such as the stories he reported from Iraq, Afghanistan and Africa while embedded with the U.S. Marine Corps.

== Early life ==
=== Family ===
Brent's father, Charles Monahan (born in County Donegal, Ireland) left his family when Brent was one year old. He was raised by his mother and maternal grandmother Laura Mable Todd. Patrick Monahan became Patrick Timothy Brent at the age of fourteen when adopted by his stepfather, a Marine veteran named Robert S. Brent. Brent has one daughter, Laura Elizabeth Walker born June 30, 1987, who is married to Marine veteran Benjamin Walker. Brent also mentored his nephew, now a career marine, Thomas Prentice, born October 12, 1969.

=== Education ===
Born in Chicago, Illinois, Brent is the product of the Catholic educational system. These years included St. Patrick's High School; Loyola University Chicago; two years of Catholic seminary (where he suffered expulsion), and computer studies at Notre Dame (non graduate).

=== Military ===
Brent served as an infantry Marine in the Second Battalion, Twenty Fourth Marines, Fourth Marine Division.

== Journalism ==
P.T. Brent has written approximately 150 stories for United Press International (UPI), Honolulu Star Bulletin and Leatherneck (the national magazine of the Marine Corps). His journalism career began in 2003 when he was assigned as an embedded reporter with Marines in Kuwait and Iraq. He made a total of three trips as an embedded journalist sending breaking news and home town stories about our armed forces, primarily with infantry Marines in combat in Iraq, Afghanistan and Djibouti Africa.

Many stories were published under the pseudonym Tim Monaghan as is his book of sea stories entitled "29."

Books Sea 29 Stories – editions Alfa, Bravo, Charlie and Companion IV

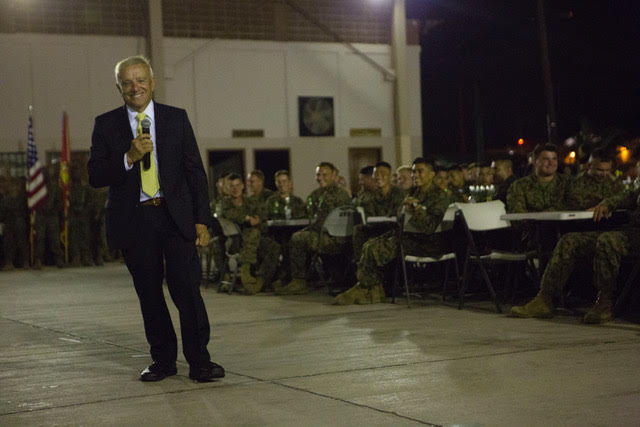
Honduras Marine Ball

== Business career ==
During college years in Chicago, Mr. Brent worked the night shift at several prominent hotels as an auditor and became familiar with NCR accounting machines and computers. Mr. Brent was initially hired by NCR as a programmer for accounting machines and computers (hotel and hospital systems). Three years later Brent moved to University Company in Chicago; where he received a series of promotions leading to regional manager and was based in Houston. Five years hence Mr. Brent relocated to San Francisco, where he founded the first of several computer service companies. In four short years, Western Twenty-nine, Inc. grew into a profitable operation with revenues exceeding 28 million dollars, and serving customers in over thirty states, Canada and Europe. The company pioneered data communications between nine major airlines and designed the first reservation and accounting system for travel agents. A few years later a division of the McDonnell-Douglas Corporation acquired the company.

Subsequently, Brent became president of CRS, Inc. (the computer subsidiary of the Charles Schwab & Company) undertaking its reorganization and sale. CRS was sold to National Data Corporation at which time Mr. Brent founded and became CEO and chairman of Hamilton Taft & Company.

Hamilton Taft & Company originated computer services for payroll tax reporting and processing trust funds exceeding four billion dollars annually throughout the United States. The company had over five hundred major corporations as clients, and had assets worth approximately eighty million dollars. It was acquired by CIGNA in 1984.

Subsequently, Brent founded the Laura Todd Cookie Company, which is fondly named, after his grandmother. In 1987 he sold the majority of stock to the San Francisco Sourdough Company. Laura Todd has one location in Chicago, four in California, and eleven in Europe.

From 1985 to 1999 Mr. Brent created both Baldwin Forrester Company (San Francisco) an Information System Consultant Firm and Bradford Adams & company (Palo Alto) a Digital Publishing Firm.

In 1989 Brent spearheaded a dramatic "turnaround" as CEO of Windjammer Cruises in Hawaii. From 1992 to 1994 he reorganized and then sold the assets of Stellar Net, Inc. to Envoy Corporation. Later, with partner James Patrick Sharp, Mr. Brent became the co-founder of Sharp 29, Inc in Honolulu, Hawaii. From 2004 to 2007, Brent created and operated Pearl Harbor Visitor Center.

Currently, Brent is a partner in Donegal Group Hawaii including the Hotel Aqua Marina in Waikiki.

== Acting ==
Brent's acting debut in the movie Go for Broke premiered in the 2017 Hawaii International Film Festival.

Brent played Captain George Brackett in the musical South Pacific in 2017.

== Other activities ==
Brent has been a director in the Marine Corps Command and Staff College and the Marine Corps University foundation. Has served for 15 years as a trustee of the summer camp for teenagers at Camp Pendleton, California, known as Devil Pups of America. He founded and sponsored the Annual Irish Sprint in San Francisco and Hawaii since 1979. Effective March 2010, this race is operated by the Marine Corps Marathon in Virginia. An avid runner, he has successfully completed sixteen marathons, including two in Boston, two in Honolulu, and two Marine Corps marathons. He swims competitively, plays tennis and polo. As one of the founders of Eldorado, Honolulu, and San Diego Polo Clubs Brent played for 29 years and was elected as governor of the western polo circuit for eight years. Brent was an American ambassador of the International Polo Federation (FIP) in 1982. Created the first movie on Polo Fundamentals as well as published POLO Gazette.
