= Pediatric Annals =

- Discipline: Pediatrics
- Language: English
- Edited by: Joseph R. Hageman

Publication details
- History: 1972–present
- Publisher: Slack
- Frequency: Monthly
- Impact factor: 0.636 (2017)

Standard abbreviations
- ISO 4: Pediatr. Ann.

Indexing
- CODEN: PDANBO
- ISSN: 0090-4481 (print); 1938-2359 (web)
- OCLC no.: 01772141

Links
- Journal homepage; Online archive

Pediatric Annals is a monthly peer-reviewed medical journal covering diagnosis and treatment of various pediatric diseases and disorders. It was established in 1972 and is published by Slack.

== History ==
The journal was established 1972 with Milton I. Levine as founding editor-in-chief. The current editor-in-chief is Joseph R. Hageman.

== Abstracting and indexing ==
The journal is abstracted and indexed in:

- Current Contents/Clinical Medicine
- EBSCO databases
- Embase
- Index Medicus/MEDLINE/PubMed
- ProQuest databases
- Science Citation Index Expanded
- Scopus
- Social Sciences Citation Index

According to the Journal Citation Reports, the journal has a 2017 impact factor of 0.636.
