= Paul Archibald Brent =

American musician

Paul Archibald Brent (March 4, 1907, Baltimore – March 11, 1997, Baltimore) was an American musician, the first African American to attend the prestigious Peabody Conservatory in Baltimore, Maryland. He graduated in 1953.
