= Brent A. Wilkes =

American CEO

Brent Ashley Wilkes
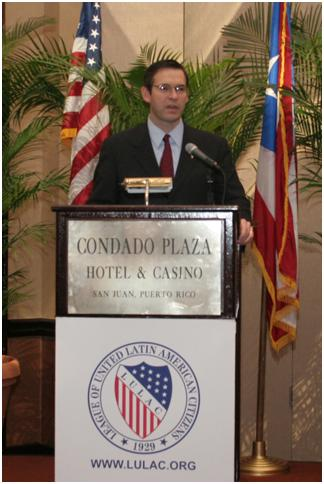
- Education: BA, Dartmouth College
- Occupation: Chief Executive Officer
- Employer: LULAC
- Spouse: Angela Cross Wilkes
- Children: Two sons

Brent Ashley Wilkes is the former National Executive Director of the League of United Latin American Citizens.

== Personal life ==
Brent Ashley Wilkes graduated from Dartmouth College in Hanover, NH. Currently he lives in Virginia with his wife Angela Cross Wilkes and his two sons.

== Professional career ==
As the executive director of the largest and oldest Hispanic civil rights organization in the United States, Wilkes worked towards fulfilling the LULAC mission: "to advance the economic condition, educational attainment, political influence, health, housing and civil rights of the Hispanic population of the United States."
