= Brent Mikesell =

American powerlifter

Brent Mikesell is a powerlifter from the United States. On March 27, 2002, he set a world record by squatting 1075 pounds. He surpassed this record by squatting 1141 pounds in 2004.

Brent Mikesell is also famous for his squat of 517.5 kg (1,140.9 pounds) by squatting to full depth with this weight in WPC gear. This, and his raw best at 410.0 kg (raw) with no assisting equipment, makes him arguably among the greatest squat lifters of all time.

== Biography ==
Mikesell was born in Idaho, United States, in 1967 and grew up in Washington. After completing high school, he played American football on a scholarship to the University of Montana. He lives with his wife and three children in Spokane, teaching Physical Education and Math. As of November 2004, Mikesell is recovering from two surgeries and is taking a rest from competition.
