= Tommy Brent =

American theatre producer

Thomas Brent Cheseldine (October 15, 1922 – June 4, 2011), better known as Tommy Brent, was an American theater producer who preserved and managed the Theatre-By-the-Sea at Card Ponds Road in South Kingstown, Rhode Island. He was born in Washington, D.C., and died in Matunuck, Rhode Island.
