= Brent C. Overson =

American politician (born 1950)

Member of the Utah State Senate from the 6th district
- In office 1983–1987

Personal details
- Born: April 18, 1950 (age 76) Nephi, Utah, U.S.
- Party: Republican
- Education: University of Maryland; University of Utah

Brent C. Overson (born April 18, 1950) is an American politician. He served as a Republican member for the 6th district of the Utah State Senate.

== Life and career ==
Overson was born in Nephi, Utah. He served in the United States Navy for six years. He attended the University of Maryland and the University of Utah.

Overson was a real estate investment consultant.

Overson served in the Utah State Senate from 1983 to 1987.
