= Brent Trolle =

New Zealand landscape painter

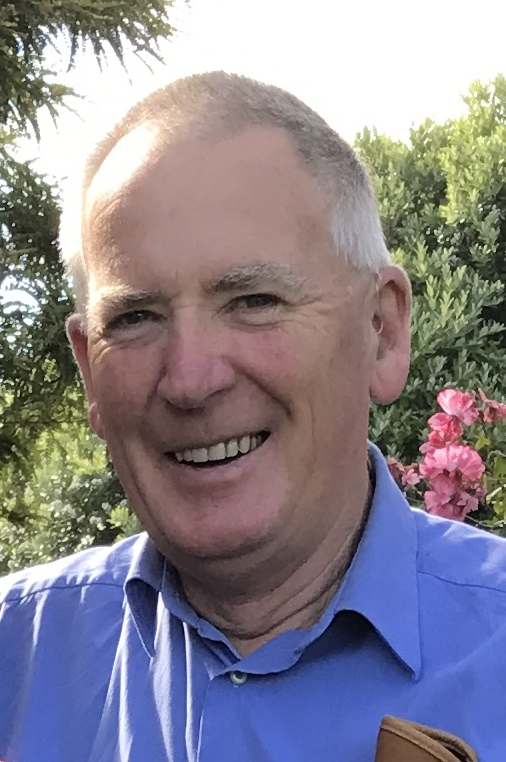
- Born: 1947 (age 78–79); Wellington, New Zealand
- Known for: landscape painting
- Website: www.brenttrolle.co.nz

Brent Trolle (born 1947), also styled as Brent Trollé, is a New Zealand artist based in Hokitika on the West Coast. He is known for his oil and acrylic landscapes, mostly of Westland, Nelson, Canterbury, and Otago.

== Biography ==
Trolle was born in 1947 in Wellington and brought up in Canterbury. Interested in painting from an early age, he was taken round the dealer galleries of Christchurch by his parents, where he met the artist Austen Deans, who was to be a significant influence on his work. Trolle worked for a time as a ranger with the National Parks Authority in Westland before becoming a full-time artist around 1970.

Trolle's wife Grace is his business partner and handles sales, marketing, and the logistics of painting expeditions. Their son Lance is also an exhibited artist.

== Art ==
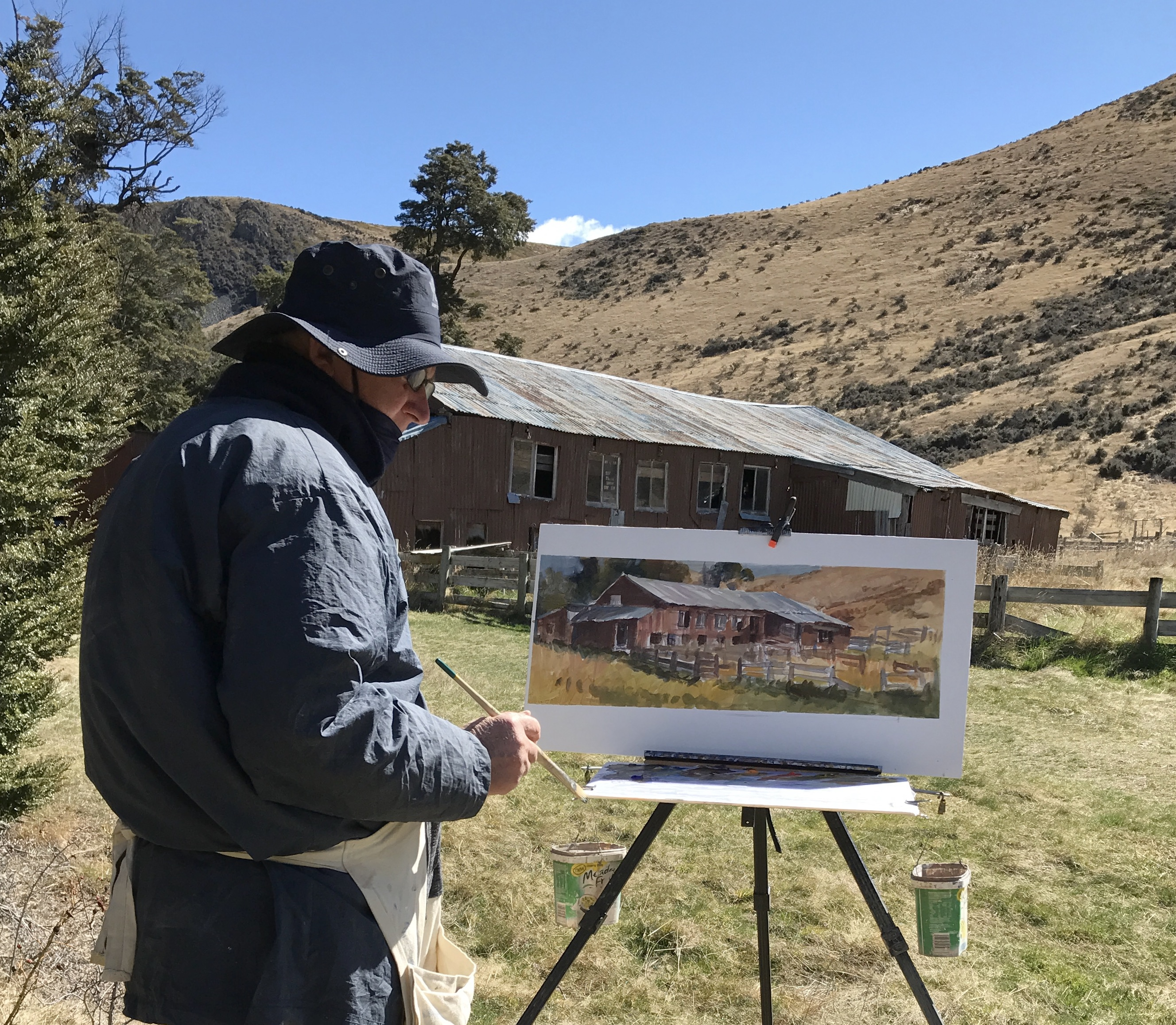
Trolle painting Quailburn woolshed, Omarama, Otago

When working as a National Parks ranger, Trolle spent most of his spare time drawing in pencil, wash, or felt pen, concentrating on derelict sawmills, houses and machinery as well as some landscape and bush scenes. A selection were published in his 1975 book Westland.

Today Trolle is most known for his landscapes of New Zealand scenery, particularly from the West Coast region, though he has also depicted Nelson, Canterbury, Otago, and overseas scenes. He works en plein air, initially painting a scene in acrylics before finishing it in oils in his Hokitika studio/gallery. Acrylics dry in five to 10 minutes, and have other advantages:

"Acrylics provide a wonderfully flexible medium…although hard-edged, they may be changed and manipulated without the need to remove the surface paint layers as with oils. On the other hand, oils can provide an excellent medium for working in the studio. Their slow drying times allow blending and manipulation over time, unlike acrylics."

In summer and early autumn when the sun produces muted colours and short shadows Trolle works on seascapes and forests, especially Punakaiki and Knights Point. In the winter after rain, with snowy mountains, he prefers alpine and valley scenes. His wife Grace prepares his canvases and frames the work. Trolle's work has been exhibited throughout New Zealand as well as the USA, Canada, and the Pacific Islands.

Two of Trolle's paintings, depicting the yet-to-be gazetted Paparoa National Park, were selected for the National Parks Centennial exhibition in 1987. He has been an tutor at Tai Poutini Polytechnic and taught art workshops, even occasionally to primary school students.

On his career as an artist, Trolle said, "I love the feeling of creating something that is inside me and I try to be as honest as I can. Art is honesty."

== Gallery ==
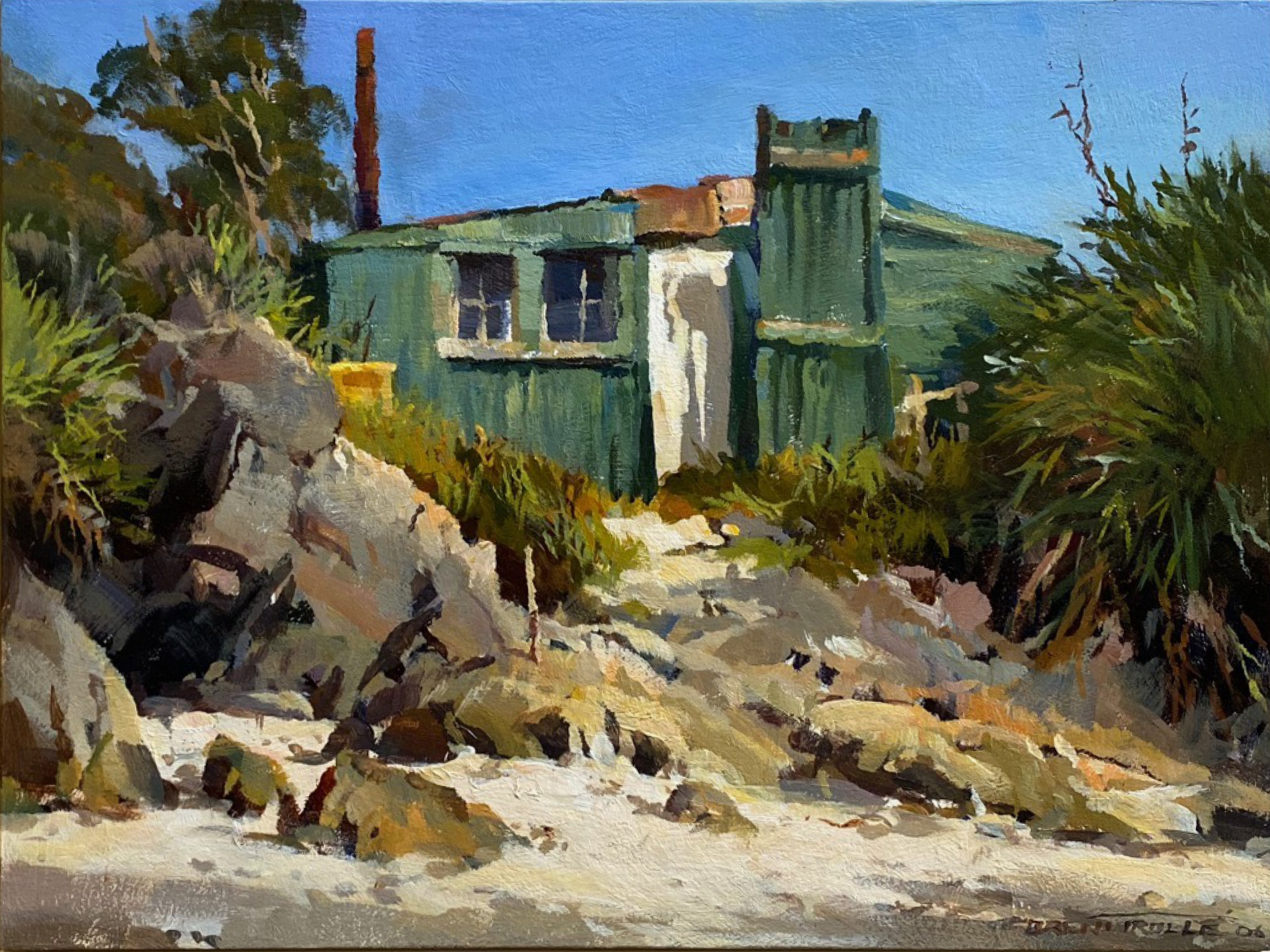
Cottage, Crow Bay (2009)

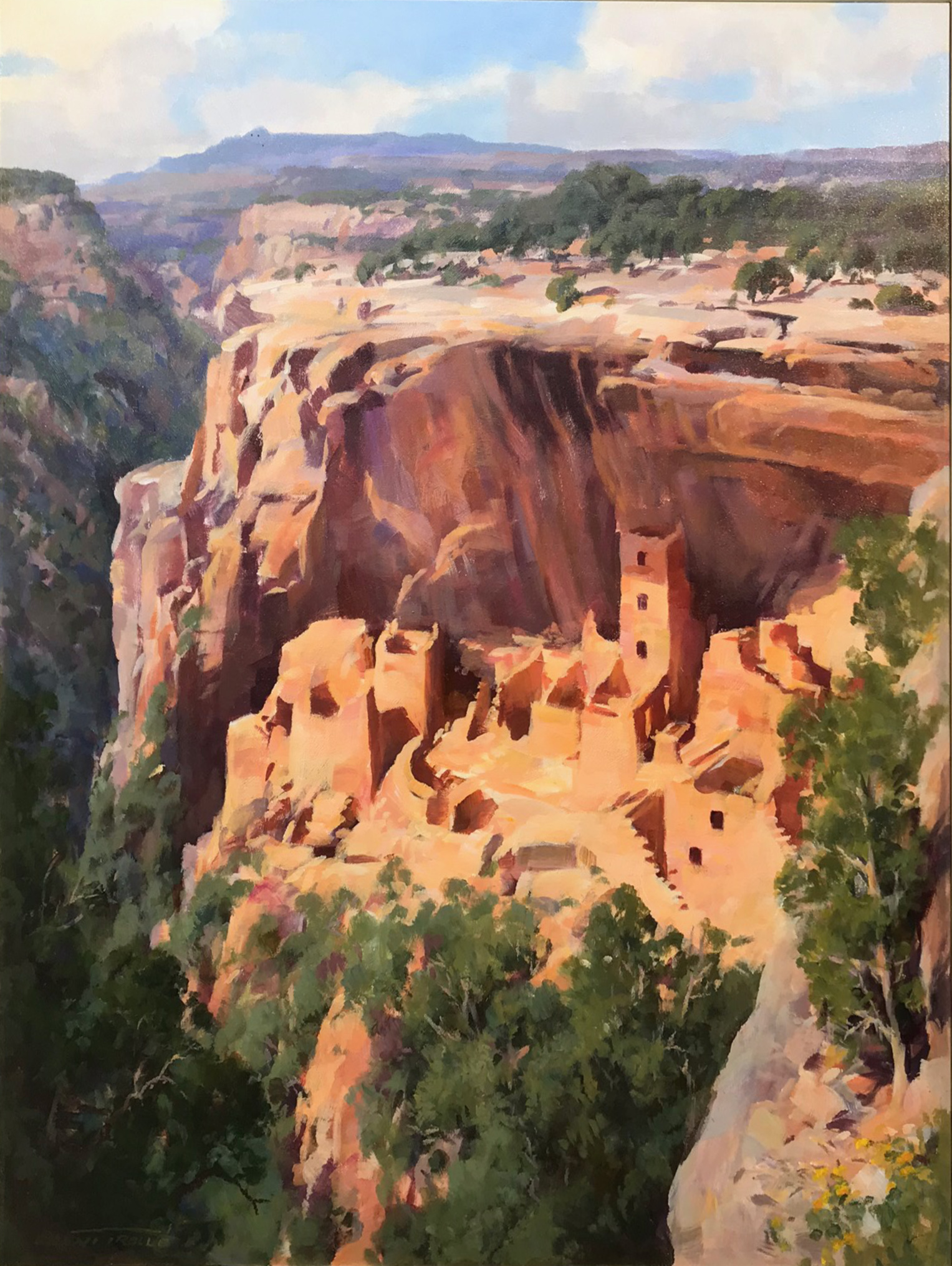
Mesa Verde, USA (2017)

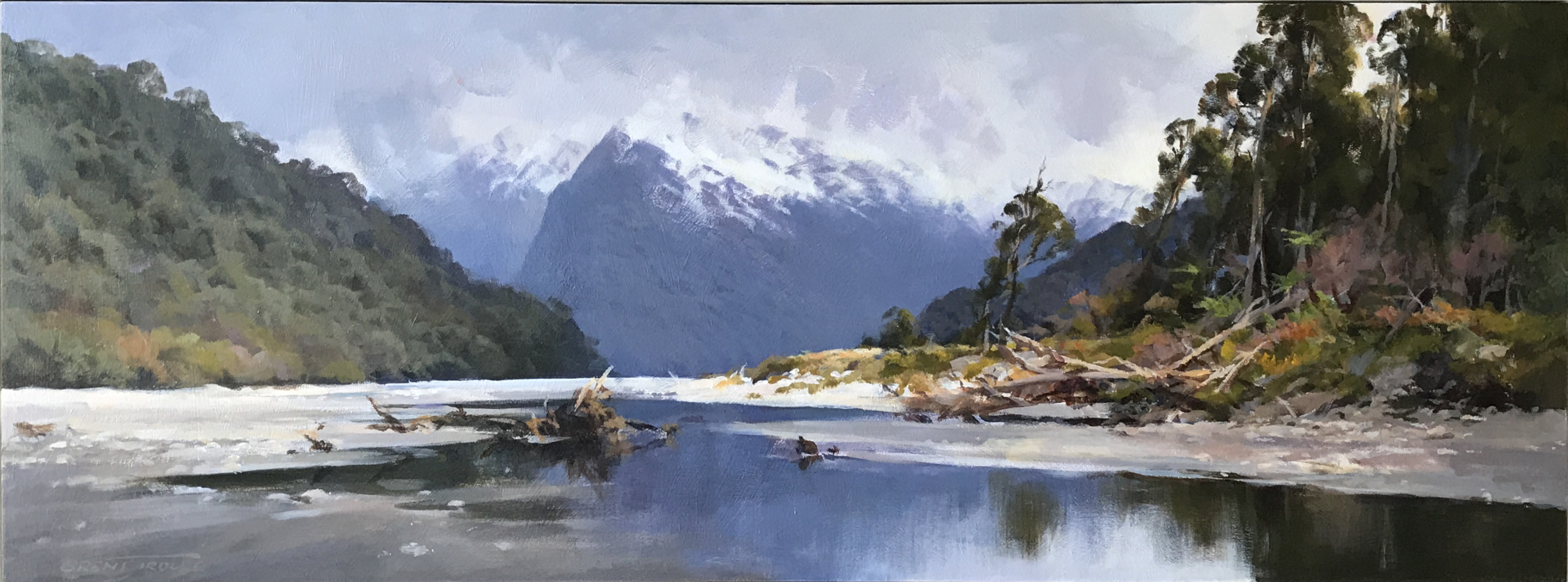
Haast River (2020)

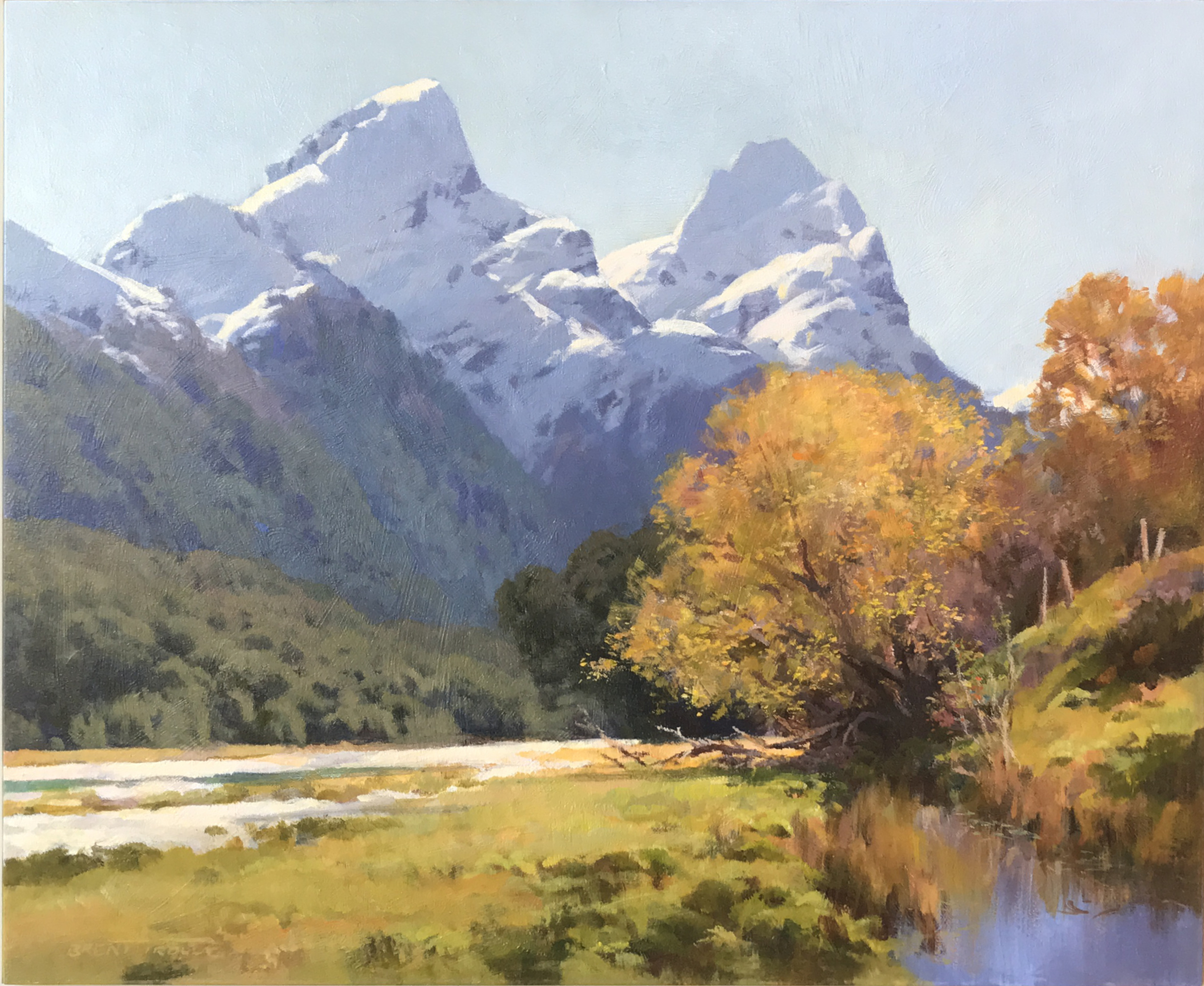
Paradise Valley, Glenorchy (2021)

== Publications ==
- Trollé, Brent (1975). Westland. Wellington: A.H. & A.W. Reed. ISBN 9780589009168.
- Trollé, Brent; Wall, G.C.A. (1980). Canterbury Paintings. Wellington: A.H. & A.W. Reed. ISBN 0589013238.
