= Burt =

Name

Burt is a given name and also a shortened form of other names, such as Burton and Herbert, or a place name.

Burt may refer to:

== People ==
- Burt Alvord (1866–after 1910), American Old West lawman and outlaw
- Burt Aull (1871–1947), American football player
- Burt Bacharach (1928–2023), American composer, music producer and pianist
- Burt Balaban (1922–1965), American film producer and director
- Burt Bales (1916–1969), American jazz stride pianist
- Burt Brown Barker (1873–1960), American lawyer and administrator
- Burt Baskin (1913–1967), American co-founder of the Baskin-Robbins ice cream parlor chain
- Burt Blague (born 1975), Russian circus performer, comedian and director
- Burt Blanca (born 1944), Belgian rock and roll musician
- Burt Boutin, American professional poker player
- Burt Boyar (1927–2018), American columnist, voice actor and author
- Burt Brent, American reconstructive plastic surgeon
- Burt Brinckerhoff (born 1936), American actor, director and producer
- Burt D. Cady (1874–1952), American politician
- Burt Caesar, British actor, broadcaster and director
- Burt Cockley (born 1986), Australian cricketer
- Burt Collins (1931–2007), American jazz trumpeter
- Burt Delavan (1929–2013), American football tackle
- Burt Doo (1930–2013), American business executive
- Burt Douglas (1930–2000), American film, stage and television actor
- Burt Elliott (born 1947), American politician
- Burt Wendell Fansher (1880–1941), Canadian politician
- Burt Ford, pseudonym of English singer, songwriter and music producer Cameron McVey (born 1957)
- Burt Gillett (1891–1971), American director of animated films
- Burt Glinn (1925–2008), American photographer
- Burt Goldberg, American clinical professor of chemistry
- Burt Goldblatt (1924–2006), American art director, graphic designer, photographer and author
- Burt Grinstead (born 1988), American actor, producer and writer
- Burt Grossman (born 1967), National Football League player
- Burt Gustafson (1925–2022), American athlete and sports coach
- Burt Hara, American clarinetist
- Burt Hochberg (1933–2006), writer and publisher on chess
- Burt Hooton (born 1950), American former Major League Baseball pitcher and coach
- Burt C. Hopkins (born 1954), American philosopher
- Burt Ingwersen (1898–1969), American football, basketball, and baseball player and coach
- Burt Jenner (born 1978), American businessman and racing driver
- Burt Johnson (1890–1927), American sculptor
- Burt Jones (born 1979), American politician and businessman
- Burt Kaliski, cryptographer
- Burt Kanner (born 1939), American swimmer and coach
- Burt Z. Kasson (1877–1943), American engineer and politician
- Burt Katz (1937–2016), American pizza-maker
- Burt Kearns, American author, journalist, and television and film producer, writer and director
- Burt Keeley (1879–1952), American baseball pitcher
- Burt Kelly (1898–1963), American film producer and writer
- Burt Kennedy (1922–2001), American screenwriter and director
- Burt Keppler (1925–2008), American photographer, journalist and author
- Burt Kimmelman (born 1947), American poet and scholar
- Burt Kwouk (1930–2016), English actor best known for playing Cato in the Pink Panther films
- Burt Lancaster (1913–1994), American film actor
- Burt Lancon (born 1960), American pair skater
- Burt Matthews (1926–2004), Canadian soil scientist and an academic administrator
- Burt McKinnie (1879–1946), American golfer
- Burt Metcalfe (1935–2022), Canadian-American film and television producer, director, screenwriter and actor
- Burt Meyer (1926–2025), American inventor
- Burt Monroe (1930–1994), American ornithologist
- Burt Munro (1899–1978), New Zealand motorcycle racer
- Burt Mustin (1884–1977), American character actor
- Burt Myers (born 1975), American race car driver
- Burt Neuborne (born 1941), American law professor and director
- Burt Nodella (1924–1916), American television producer
- Burt Ovrut, American theoretical physicist
- Burt Paulin (born 1955), Canadian politician
- Burt Phillips, American disc jockey, bandleader, and music promoter in the 1940s
- Burt Prelutsky (1940–2021), an American screenwriter, newspaper columnist and author
- Burt Procter (1901–1980), American painter
- Burt Pugach (1927–2020), American lawyer and criminal
- Burt Reinhardt (1920–2011), American journalist and news executive
- Burt Reynolds (1936–2018), American actor and director
- Burt Rhodes (1923–2003), British musical director and composer
- Burt Rutan (born 1943), American aerospace engineer
- Burt W. Rynders (1871–1935), American politician, educator, and businessman
- Burt Saunders (born 1948), American politician
- Burt Schuman (born 1948), American Polish rabbi
- Burt Shavitz (1935–2015), American beekeeper and businessman, founder of the personal care company Burt's Bees
- Burt Shevelove (1915–1982), American musical theater playwright, lyricist, librettist and director
- Burt Shotton (1884–1962), American Major League Baseball player, manager, coach and scout
- Burt E. Skeel (1894–1924), American aviator
- Burt K. Snyder (1890–1964), American businessman and politician
- Burt Solomons (born 1950), American attorney and politician
- Burt L. Standish, pen name of American novelist Gilbert Patten
- Burt Styler (1925–2011), American television and film screenwriter and producer
- Burt Sugarman (born 1939), American film and television producer
- Burt L. Talcott (1920–2016), seven-term former member of the US House of Representatives from California
- Burt Topper (1928–2007), American film director and screenwriter
- Burt Totaro (born 1967), American mathematician
- Burt Tulson (born 1947), American politician
- Burt Van Horn (1823–1896), two-term U.S. representative from New York
- Burt Ward (born 1945), American actor best known for playing Robin on the TV show Batman
- Burt Weissbourd (born 1949), novelist, screenwriter and film producer
- Burt Whaley, American politician
- Burt Green Wilder (1841–1925), American comparative anatomist
- Burt Wilson (1933–2021), American philosopher, writer, broadcaster, jazz musician, political activist, playwright, and advertising executive
- Burt Wolf (born 1938), American writer and TV producer
- Burt Young (1940–2023), stage name of American actor, painter and author Gerald Tommaso DeLouise

== Fictional characters ==
- Burt, a character in the 2015 American comedy-drama movie The Diary of a Teenage Girl
- Brigadier "Burt" Badboy, a character voiced by Grey DeLisle from Danger Mouse
- Burt Berendsen, a character in Amsterdam (2022 film)
- Burt Campbell from the TV series Soap
- Burt Chance from the TV series Raising Hope
- Burt Fabelman, in the 2022 film The Fabelmans, based on director Steven Spielberg's father Arnold Spielberg
- Burt Gervasi from the TV show The Sopranos
- Burt Gummer from the Tremors film series and short-lived TV show
- Burt Hummel from the TV musical series Glee
- Burt Weems, a character in the American sitcom television series The Hogan Family
- Burt Wilson, a character in the film Mr. Nanny
- Burt Wonderstone, a lead character in the film The Incredible Burt Wonderstone
- Burt Worm, a fictional character from the animated film A Merry Mirthworm Christmas and 2 sequels

== Animals ==
- Burt (crocodile), crocodile that starred in Crocodile Dundee

== See also ==
- Burt (surname)
- Bert (disambiguation)
- Birt (disambiguation)
