= Burt Blague =

American circus performer

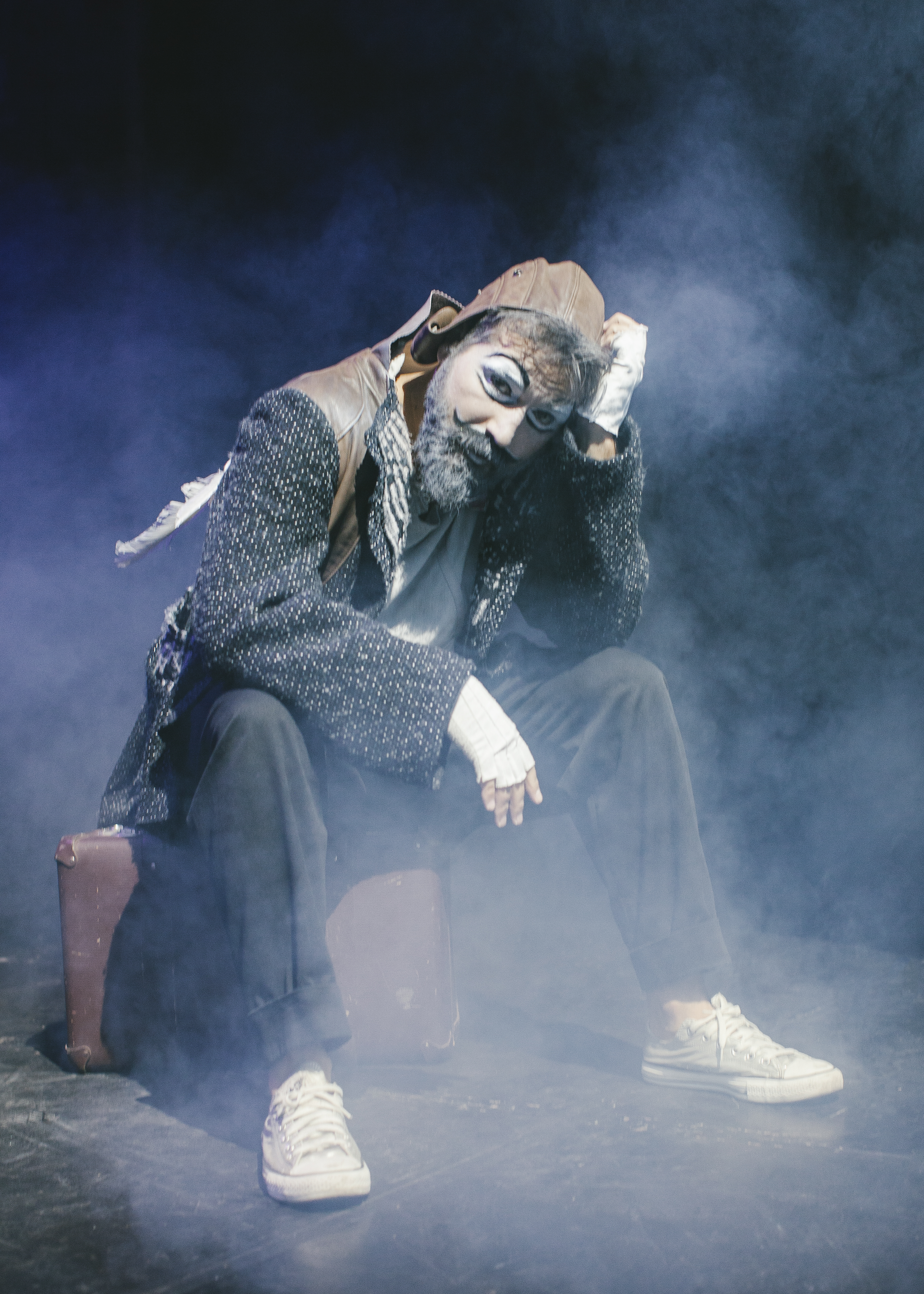
Backstage photo of Burt Blague from his "Let's go Show"

Burt Blague (born Sergey Ignatov (Russian: Сергéй Леони́дович Игнáтов); born September 7, 1975) is a 4th generation artist, circus performer, comedian, director, teacher and producer.

Burt was born in a circus family, the dynasty of circus artists – the Ignatovs whose history began in the beginning of the 20th century. The great-grandfather, Ivan Petrovich Ignatov (1900-1975), was a groom and a riding master at the circus. He was an assistant trainer for the Nikitins, Efim Efimov, Gleb Lapiado, Vladimir Teplov.

The grandfather, Mikhail Ivanovich Ignatov (1922-1967), was a circus artist. Before the World War II he had been a dzhigit in Kshi's group. In the 1950s, he was an administrator at the Children's Department of the Mosconcert. In the 1960s he performed on stage with trained dogs and monkeys.

The parents Lidia Ignatova (1953) and Leonid Ignatov (1953) are famous Russian acrobats and jugglers. They started their circus career in Moscow circus in 1973. Living in France they are still performing.

The uncle (the father's brother) Sergei Ignatov (senior) (1950) is a famous juggler of the 20 century.

At the age of 13, Sergey Ignatov jr was awarded the Grand Prix at the Circus of the Future festival in Paris (1988). He is a twice World Juggling Federation Ring Division Champion (2004, 2008). In 2004 in the WJF 1 Championship, held in Las Vegas, Nevada he won two gold medals: in advanced rings division and in «5 rings up 360» competitions.

In 2008 in the WJF 5 Championship he won the gold medal in advanced rings division competitions again Famous American magician and TV presenter Penn Jillette described him in 2004 as "the Best ring juggler in the World".

Burt Blague worked for the Disney company. He is the creator and the original cast of the one man show "Sergio - the Italian Chef" at the Italian pavilion of Epcot Theme park (Orlando, FL). He also has been a consultant for the National Circus Project.

In 2003 in collaboration with Valentin Yudashkin as a costume designer, he staged in Moscow a show "Ploskosti".

In 2011, Burt Blague started performing as a clown in Riga Circus.

In 2015 he produced and directed a "Let's go Show", which toured in Peru in 2016.

A member of a jury at XVII Open Magic Championship.

== Biography ==
1988-1992 - Moscow Circus Tourney - USSR, Japan

1989 - Golden Medal Winner at the "World Festival of the Circus of Tomorrow" (Paris, France)

1990-1991 - Old Moscow Circus on Tsvetnoy Boulevard (Nikulin Circus)

1991 - Moscow Circus "Mission: Roots" - Greece, Italy, France, Egypt, Israel, Cyprus, Turkey

1991 - "Theater der Landeshauptstadt" - Germany

1991-1996 - "Moscow Circus" Tours - Russia, Japan, Greece, Italy, France, Egypt, Malta, Israel, Cyprus, Turkey, Finland

1992 - Finlandia Talo Huset Hall - Finland

1994 - Graduated from the school of modern choreography of Nikolay Ogryzkov (1st professional school of contemporary dance in Russia)

1995 - "Music Hall" - St. Petersburg, Russia

1995 - "Music Hall" - Lima, Peru

1995 - Taiwan Tour

1996 - Circus "Tihani", Chili

1996-1998 - "Moscow Circus" Tours - Russia, Japan

1998 - "Tiger Palast" - Germany

1998 - Circus "Krone" - Germany

1998-2000 - Studying in dance schools: "Dance Space", "Broadway Dance Center", "Steps on Broadway" Masters: Savion Glover, Ayodele Casel, Jimmy Tate, Henry LeTang, Jason Samuels Smith, Jimmy Slyde

1998-2000 - "Circus Production" - USA Tour

1998-2000 - "National Circus Project" - New York, USA

1999 - "Cirque Productions" Miami, FL, USA

1999 - "Cirque du Jour" TV Show - New York, USA

1999 - "New Wave Circus" - Atlantic City, USA

2000-2003 - Walt Disney Epcot Theme Park - Orlando, Florida, USA

2003 - Musical "Shock" - Tokyo, Japan

2003 - Director and Producer the show "Ploskosti" - Moscow, Russia

2004-2005 - "National Circus Project" - New York, USA

2004 - World juggling competition (WJF) - Las Vegas, USA (first-place winner)

2005 - Walt Disney Epcot Theme Park - Orlando, Florida, USA

2005-2006 - Vladivostok circus, managing director, Russia

2006-2007 - "National Circus Project" - New York, USA

2006-2008 - USA and Canada Tour "Cirque de la Symphonie"

2006 - TX Fair Dallas, USA

2007 - Film-school of directing (Alexander Mitta’s class)

2007 - TX Fair Dallas, USA

2007 - Show “FOUR” casino Estoril, Portugal

2008 - World juggling competition (WJF) - Las Vegas, USA (first-place winner)

2008 - TX Fair Dallas, USA

2009 - The European Juggling Convention in Spain (Guest Star)

2009 - TX Fair Dallas, USA

2010-2011 - Riga State Circus, Latvia

2012 - The jury of international circus festival in Riga "Golden Karl", Latvia

2011-2012 - "National Circus Project" New York, USA

2012-2013 - "Moscow circus on tour", Russia

2013-2014 - Chen Long international circus, China

2014-2015 - "Moscow circus on tour", Russia

2015 - A member of the Russian Association of Magicians - The jury of the XVI congress of Magicians.

2015-2016 - "Let’s go" Moscow, Russia

2016 - Peru, Lima Great tour with the show "Fantasy circus"

2016 - Show in "Izmir International Fair", "Burt Blague Clown Show" Turkey.

2017-2018 - "Cosmos", Russia

2019-2020 - "National Circus Project" New York, USA

2021–present - "Sergio" at EPCOT" Florida, USA
