= Yoky Matsuoka =

Japanese-American computer scientist

- 松岡陽子
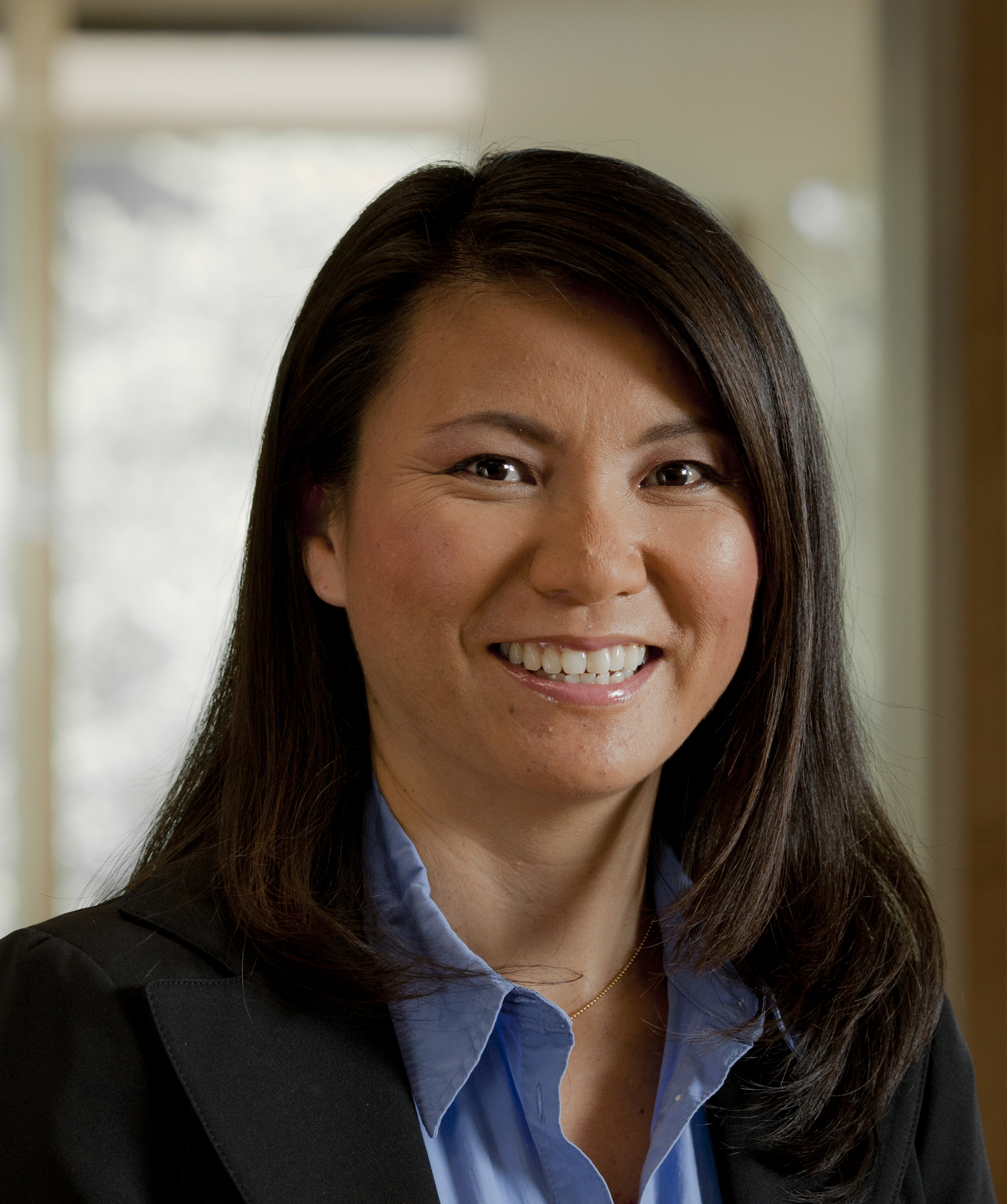
- Matsuoka in 2011
- Born: c. 1972; Japan
- Education: University of California, Berkeley; MIT
- Awards: MacArthur Fellows Program
- Scientific career
- Fields: Computer science
- Workplaces: University of Washington; Carnegie Mellon University; Barrett Technology; Google Nest

Yoky Matsuoka (松岡陽子 Matsuoka Yōko, born c. 1972 in Japan) is the CEO and Founder of Yohana (an independent subsidiary of Panasonic). She was the CTO of Google Nest, a co-founder of Google X and previously held roles as VP of Technology and Analytics at Twitter, technology executive at Apple, and as VP of Technology at Nest.

Previously, she was an assistant professor of computer science at Carnegie Mellon University and an associate professor of computer science at the University of Washington, director of Washington's Neurobotics Laboratory, director of the Center for Sensorimotor Neural Engineering. She is a 2007 MacArthur Fellow. At University of Washington, her research combined neuroscience and robotics—sometimes referred to by Matsuoka by the portmanteau neurobotics—to create more realistic prosthetics.

== Early life and education ==
Matsuoka was born in Japan and moved to California at the age of 16. In her youth, she was a semi-professional tennis player, once ranking 21st in Japan, but was eventually sidelined by injuries (she broke her ankle for the third time); her interest in robotics began with the idea of a robotic tennis player, which she later decided was unrealistic.

She received her B.S. degree in 1993 from the University of California, Berkeley and an M.S. (1995) and PhD (1998) in electrical engineering and computer science from MIT.

== Career ==
Outside academia, she was chief engineer at Barrett Technology in 1995 and 1996 where she developed the microcode for the BarrettHand. From 2001 to 2006, Yoky was an assistant professor at Carnegie Mellon University. During this time, she held the Anna Loomis McCandless Faculty Chair (from 2004), received a Presidential Early Career Award for Scientists and Engineers (2004) and an IEEE Early Career Award in Robotics and Automation (2005), and was nominated for the MacArthur Fellowship (2006), winning and joining the class of 2007. She continued her career at the University of Washington as an associate professor, and is currently working for Apple on wellness related products.

== Research ==
Matthew O'Donnell, dean of the Washington College of Engineering characterizes her as "a mechanical engineer, neuroscientist, bioengineer, robotics expert and computer scientist, all in one… [with] …the ability to see what is possible by combining all these disciplines." The MacArthur Foundation characterizes her work as "transforming our understanding of how the central nervous system coordinates musculoskeletal action and of how robotic technology can enhance the mobility of people with manipulation disabilities. The MacArthur Foundation explains her work as "an important step toward the development of a dexterous prosthetic hand that can be controlled by the brain's neural signals." Matsuoka also developed a virtual tool that allowed patients in physical therapy to move beyond their perceived physical limits.

== Industry ==
In 2011, she joined Google X as one of its three founding members. There she helped on-boarding Babak Parviz (who led the Google Glass team) and developed Google X's portfolio in medical space. In addition, Yoky was included in the development of the Mountain View's research and development arm, leading her to work with many partners of Silicon Valley. She also worked on Loon, a project that aimed to expand internet access using stratospheric balloons, and self-driving car project Waymo. She then joined Nest as VP of Technology, in charge of machine learning and UX. There she led the development of the adaptive component of the Nest Thermostat, which is a key component of the product to date. Currently, she is an advisor to Brain of Things, that provides a home that learns. In 2015 she left for Apple and worked there until Dec 2016 on Apple's HealthKit tracking software, the CareKit tool for managing patient medical care, and the ResearchKit framework. She was the Chief Technology Officer at Nest until they were acquired by Google. She is the founder and CEO of Yohana, formerly known as Yo Labs, a subsidiary of Panasonic that leverages AI to connect users with human assistants for tasks like shopping or vacation planning. At the opening of CES 2025, Yoky Matsuoka, CEO of Panasonic Holdings Corporation and Panasonic Well, unveiled the new coaching and wellness platform with her team. This platform will be launched in the United States.

== Personal life ==
She is married to a computer vision specialist and has four children.
