= Barrett Technology =

American robotics manufacturer

Barrett Technology, LLC
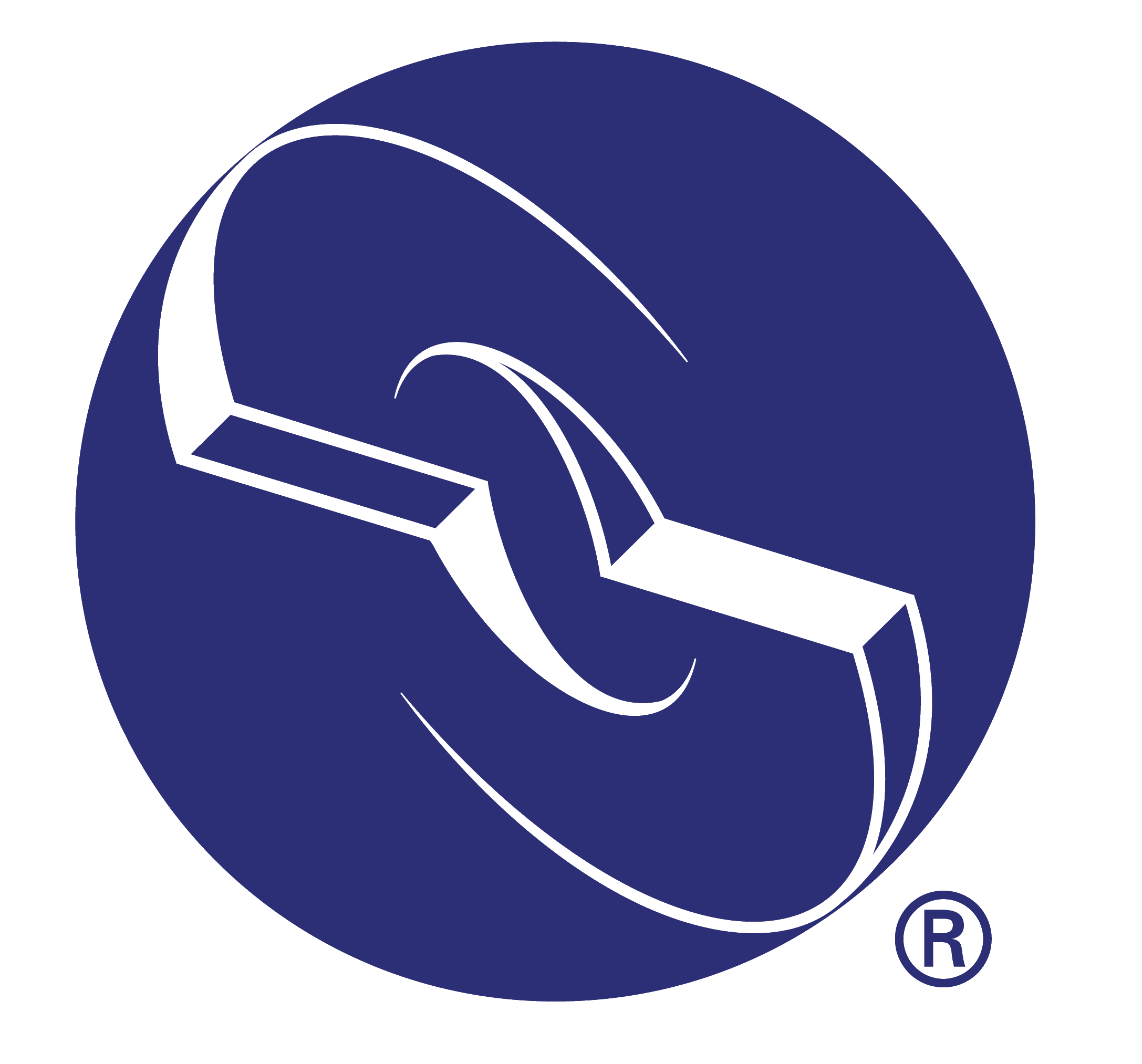
- Type: Private
- Industry: Medical Robotics and Drive Systems
- Predecessor: Barrett Technology, Inc. Barrett Communications, Inc. Barrett Design, Inc.
- Founded: Cambridge, Massachusetts (1988)
- Founder: Bill Townsend
- Headquarters: 320 Nevada Street, Ground Floor, Building Rear, Newton, Massachusetts, United States
- Area served: Worldwide
- Key people: Bill Townsend (CEO); CJ Valle (COO); Matt Rigby (CCO)
- Products: Burt®, Puck®, WAM® Robotic Arm, BarrettHand™
- Divisions: Barrett Drive Systems; Barrett Medical
- Website: barrett.com

Newton, Massachusetts, USA-based Barrett Technology was founded by Bill Townsend in 1988. The company has two divisions: Barrett Drive Systems and Barrett Medical.

The main product line for Barrett Medical is Burt® (Barrett Upper-extremity Robotic Trainer), an FDA-registered Class-II robot designed and produced in Barrett's ISO 13485-Certified facility to help patients recover from stroke, traumatic brain injury, spinal-cord injury, and other neurological impairments. Burt® is protected by US Patents as recently as 2025 with international equivalents. The president of Barrett Medical is Matt Rigby.

The main product line for Barrett Drive Systems is the Puck® brushless servomotor controller+encoder. Inspired by Gill Pratt, Barrett Drive System's Puck® is a miniature brushless motor controller developed by Barrett Technology with funding from US NASA and DOE contracts. Designed to replace traditional motor controllers, the Puck® integrates electronic space-vector commutation, power amplification, and a magnetic encoder into a single compact solid-state module that mounts directly to the tail-end of any brushless motor. Puck® is the world's smallest brushless servomotor controller at 400 W and weighing 2.0 g. This internal integration eliminates the need for wires and connectors between a separate controller and encoder, which improves reliability and simplifies assembly. The controller architecture utilizes a precise current (i.e. motor torque) control method that halves the traditional noise floor; this novel technique was granted multiple US Patents as recently as 2025 with international equivalents. The most recent iteration of the controller product line, includes the 400W-peak, P4-16™, which has a total volume of 1.2 cubic centimeters, diameter of 16 mm and weighs 2.0 grams. The president of Barrett Drive Systems is CJ Valle.

Previously, Barrett manufactured advanced robotic arms and hands for advanced research, installed in 20 countries on 6 continents, and are still being used and produced. Barrett was credited in The Guinness Book of World Records, Millennium Edition, as maker of the world's “most advanced robotic arm.” Its 7-axis robotic arm, named the WAM® arm for Whole Arm Manipulation is based on Puck® electronics and mechanical drive technologies and designed to interact directly with people. One application of an early version of the technology has been the arm manufactured and sold by MAKO Surgical Corp. which enables haptically-guided minimally-invasive knee surgery.

The Puck powered BarrettHand™ BH8-series product is based on technology licensed from the University of Pennsylvania and developed by Gill Pratt, Yoky Matsuoka, and William Townsend into its present form.

== Company history ==
Date	Event
1982–1984	Townsend works in Massachusetts Institute of Technology's "motor" lab (LEES) where novel servomotor CMOS-FET configurations/algorithms are being developed
1987	Research team at MIT invents cable-differential drive, high-speed cable drive, and haptic (WAM®) robotic arm
1988	Barrett founded by Bill Townsend as latest spinoff from MIT's AI Laboratory with funds from investor, Julianne Barrett
1990	Barrett Technology, Inc. incorporated
1991	Barrett markets brushless motor with integrated drive electronics
1992	US Patents issued on cable-drive technologies
1993	Barrett builds first BarrettHand™ prototype, combining Barrett and UPenn technologies
1995	US Patent issued on a manual cable pretensioner
1997	Barrett secures exclusive worldwide control of the WAM® cable-drive patents from MIT
1998	Barrett signs exclusive license deal with MAKO Surgical Corp. for medical applications
2001	Burt Doo becomes Barrett's Operations Chief and invests in the Company
2002	Covert work begins on Puck® development with support from MIT professors, Gill Pratt and Jeff Lang
2004	Barrett builds first Puck®-based prototype WAM for NASA-JSC
2005	MAKO Surgical Corp. wins U.S. Food and Drug Administration (FDA) approval to market a modified WAM® for knee surgery
2006	MAKO begins shipping its version of the WAM® for knee surgery under license from Barrett
2007	US Patent awarded for Hand with integrated "Palm" camera
2007	Barrett begins work on next-generation Puck®, code-named "P3" and released in 2012
2009	US Patent awarded on the Puck®, other patents pending internationally
2019	Puck®-powered Burt® (Barrett Upper-extremity Robotic Trainer) launched in the US for hospital rehabilitation after neurological injury or disease, such as stroke, spinal-cord injury, traumatic brain injury, Parkinson's, and multiple sclerosis
2024	4th-generation Puck® released
2025	Burt® surpasses 100 systems installed in the US and 400 internationally

== Sources ==
Rooks, Brian, "The harmonious robot" (PDF), Industrial Robot, archived from the original (PDF) on 2010-11-19

Smith, Julian (23 March 2007), "Can Robots Be Programmed to Learn from Their Own Experiences?", Scientific American
