= William T. Townsend =

William T. "Bill" Townsend
- Education: MIT, Northeastern
- Occupations: CEO, Barrett Technology

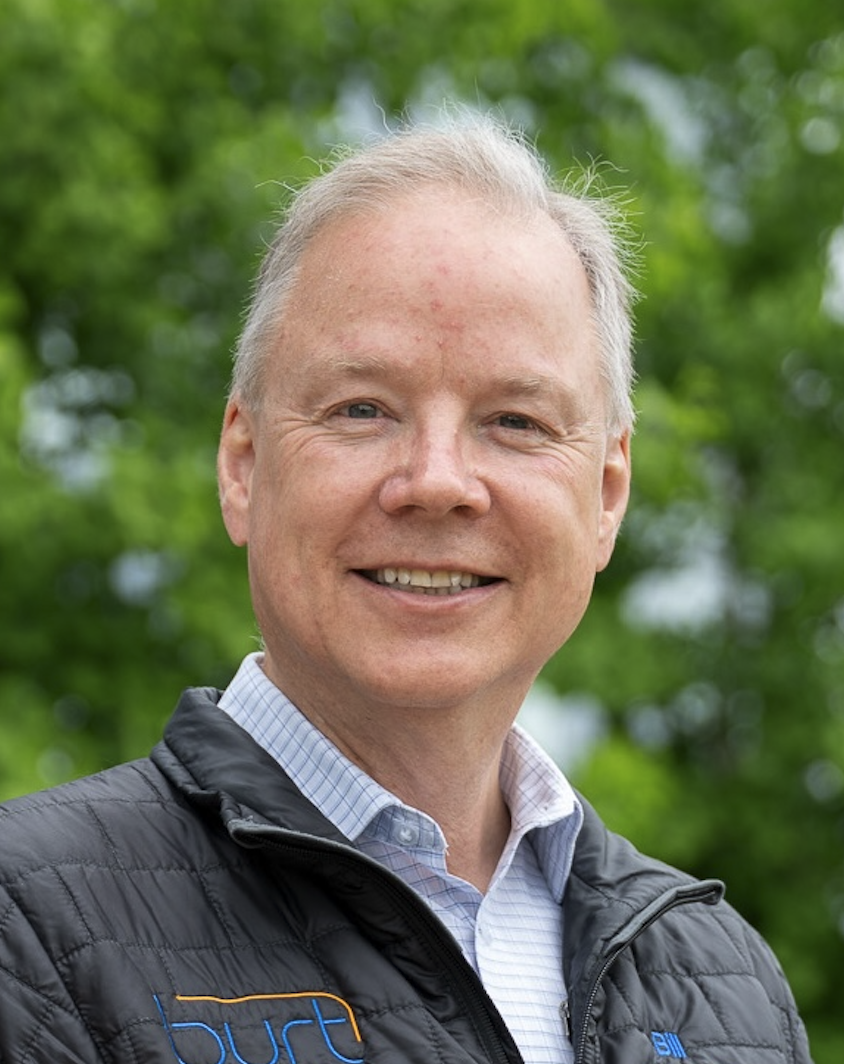
Bill Townsend

Bill Townsend founded Barrett Technology in 1988. He is an entrepreneur and inventor credited with introducing the WAM® arm, the first haptic robot and one of the first haptic devices based on novel differential and high-speed cable drives. Recent patents cover both medical products and the Puck® brushless motor controllers with substantial funding from the US National Institutes of Health (NIH) and the US National Aeronautics and Space Administration (NASA).

Bill obtained his MS and PhD degrees in Engineering from the Massachusetts Institute of Technology in 1984 and 1988 respectively. He received a BS in 1982 from Northeastern University. He has been awarded nineteen US patents and many additional international equivalents and has won several professional awards including the A3--Association for Advancing Automation and Robotics: Joseph Engelberger Award pioneering the first haptic robot (WAM arm®) designed in the 1980s at the MIT AI Lab (now CSAIL) to interact physically with people.
