= Sergej Ignatov =

Sergei Ignatov (in Russian Сергей Игнатов) (born 1950 in Chemnitz, Germany) is a Russian juggler, known as "The Poet of Juggling", notable for his numbers juggling.

At his prime during the 1970–90 period, Sergei Ignatov worked with up to 7 large balls in his performance, and 9 in practice. He frequently performed 11 rings in his act, and juggled them for 22 catches in his practice. Also in his show was 5 clubs. Ignatov is notable for his five club backcrosses, where he would throw the clubs crossing behind his back and over his shoulder while walking in a circle.

He is the uncle of noted juggler Burt Blague.

== See also ==
- List of jugglers
- Burt Blague
