= Jānis Frīdrihs Baumanis =

Latvian architect

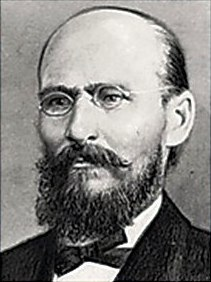
- Jānis Frīdrihs Baumanis
- Born: May 23, 1834; Riga, Russian Empire (now Latvia)
- Died: March 19, 1891 (aged 56); Riga
- Occupation: Architect
- Buildings: Riga Circus; Riga Regional Court

Jānis Frīdrihs Baumanis (or Johann Friedrich Baumann, May 23, 1834, in Riga – March 19, 1891, in Riga) was a Latvian, Baltic German architect. He was the first professional Latvian architect. Baumanis designed the Riga Circus in 1888. He was responsible for a number of important public buildings of eclectic design constructed in the second half of the 19th century in Riga.

== Biography ==
Jānis Frīdrihs Baumanis was born in 1834 in Riga, the son of a ferryman. In his youth he started work as a carpenter. In Riga he was spotted by the St. Petersburg architect Ludvig Bohnstedt. With his support Baumanis undertook studies in the Bauakademie in Berlin (1860–62) and in the St. Petersburg Academy of Arts (1862–65). After that he was a government architect in Livland (now Vidzeme) until he established his own practice in Riga.

Baumanis also played an important role in Latvian cultural history. In 1862 he helped to establish the first union of Russian architects in St. Petersburg. In 1879 he was involved in establishing the Union of Riga Architects (Rigaer Architekten=Verein). Further, in 1868, he helped to establish the Latvian union in Riga.

His main professional activity was in relation to the former defensive walls of Riga. The walls, built of sand, were demolished in the mid-19th century and a new string of boulevards was planned. He designed 40% of the buildings in this area. His buildings were mostly eclectic (a combination of Neo-Renaissance and Neo-Gothic elements) in design, with refined details and well-executed plastic forms.

He also designed the Alexanders Gymnasium (a secondary school) in Riga, now the Latvian Academy of Music, in 1870-75.

From 1887 to 1888 Baumanis was responsible for the building of the Riga Regional Court at 34 Brīvības Blvd. In its construction Baumanis drew on both Classical and Baroque influences for the façades. The structure won him considerable acclaim not only for the exterior but also for the interior design.

Altogether he designed 17 Orthodox churches in the southern part of Estonia and Vidzeme and more than 150 buildings in Riga.

== Gallery ==
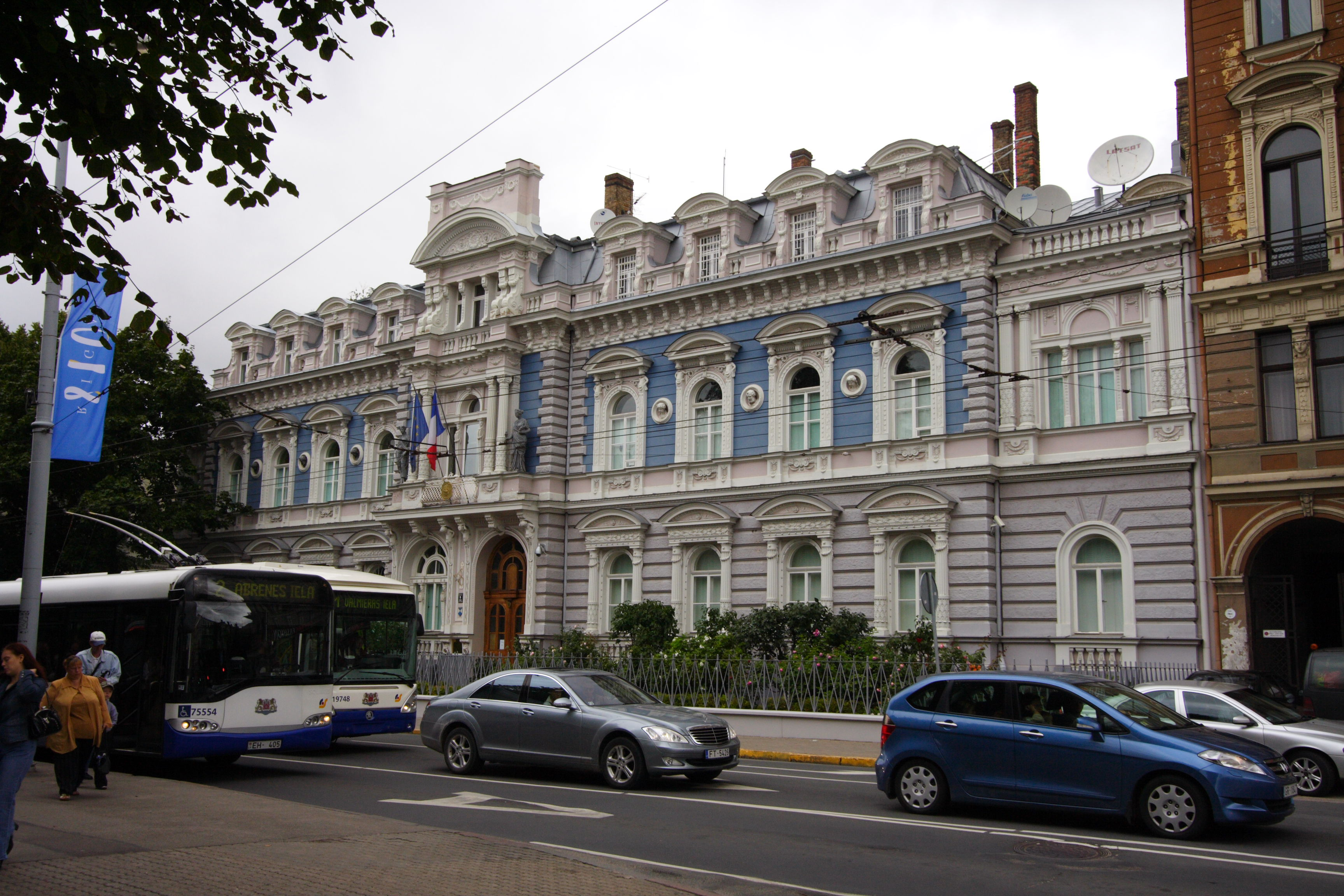
Mansion of Emma Menzendorf (now the French Embassy)

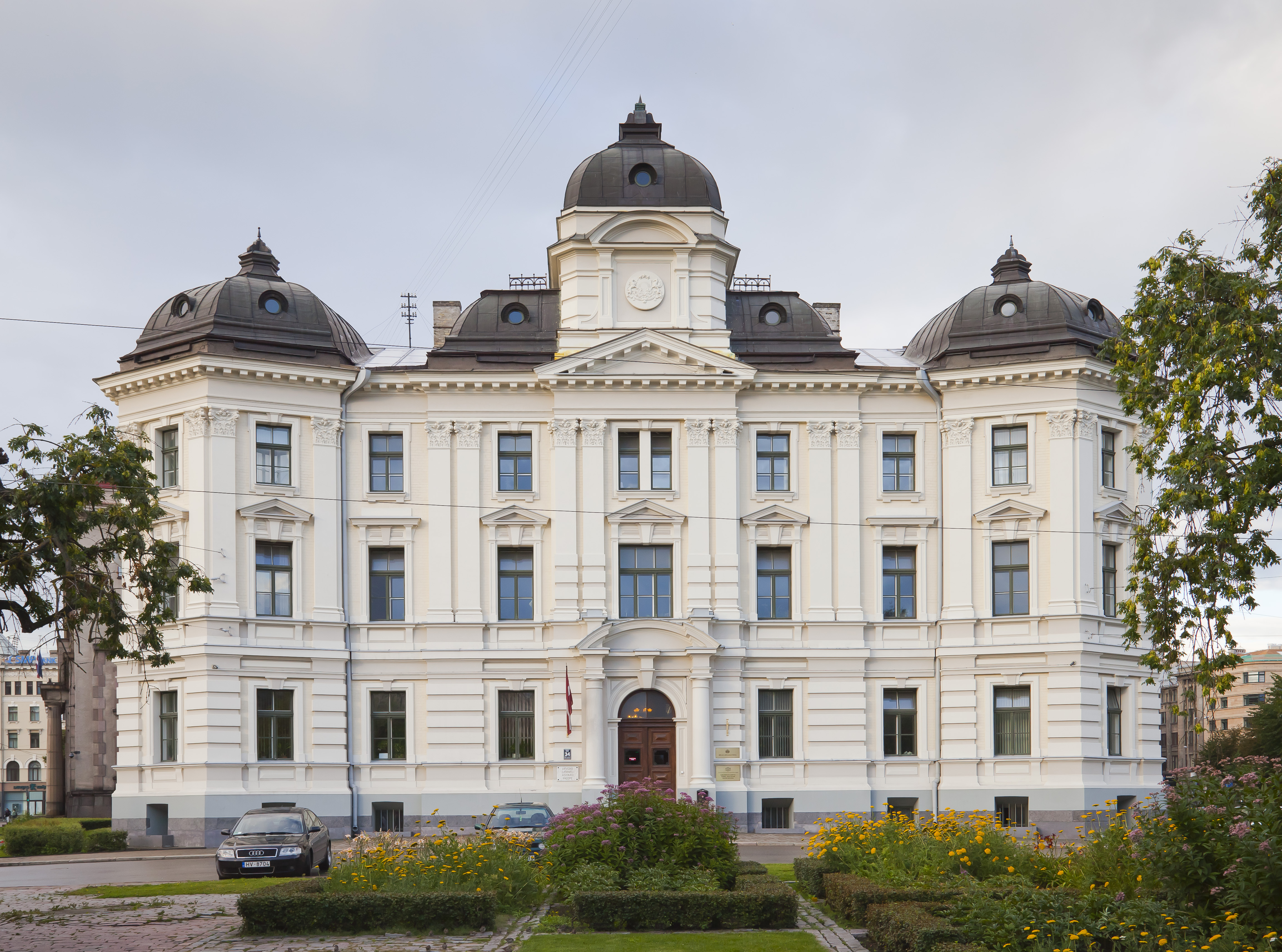
Riga Regional Court building

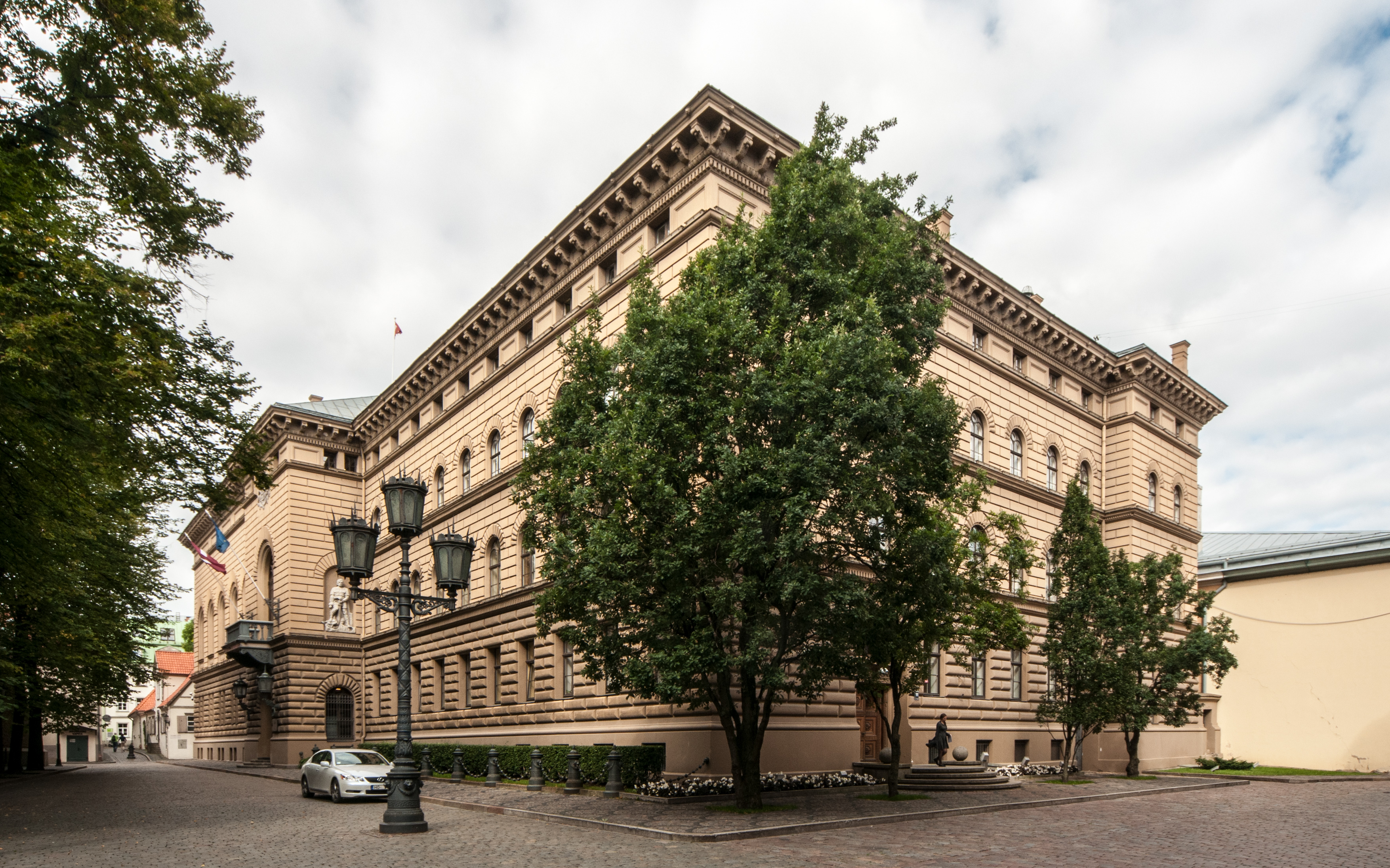
The Saeima (House of the Livonian Noble Corporation): Baumanis and R. Pflug)

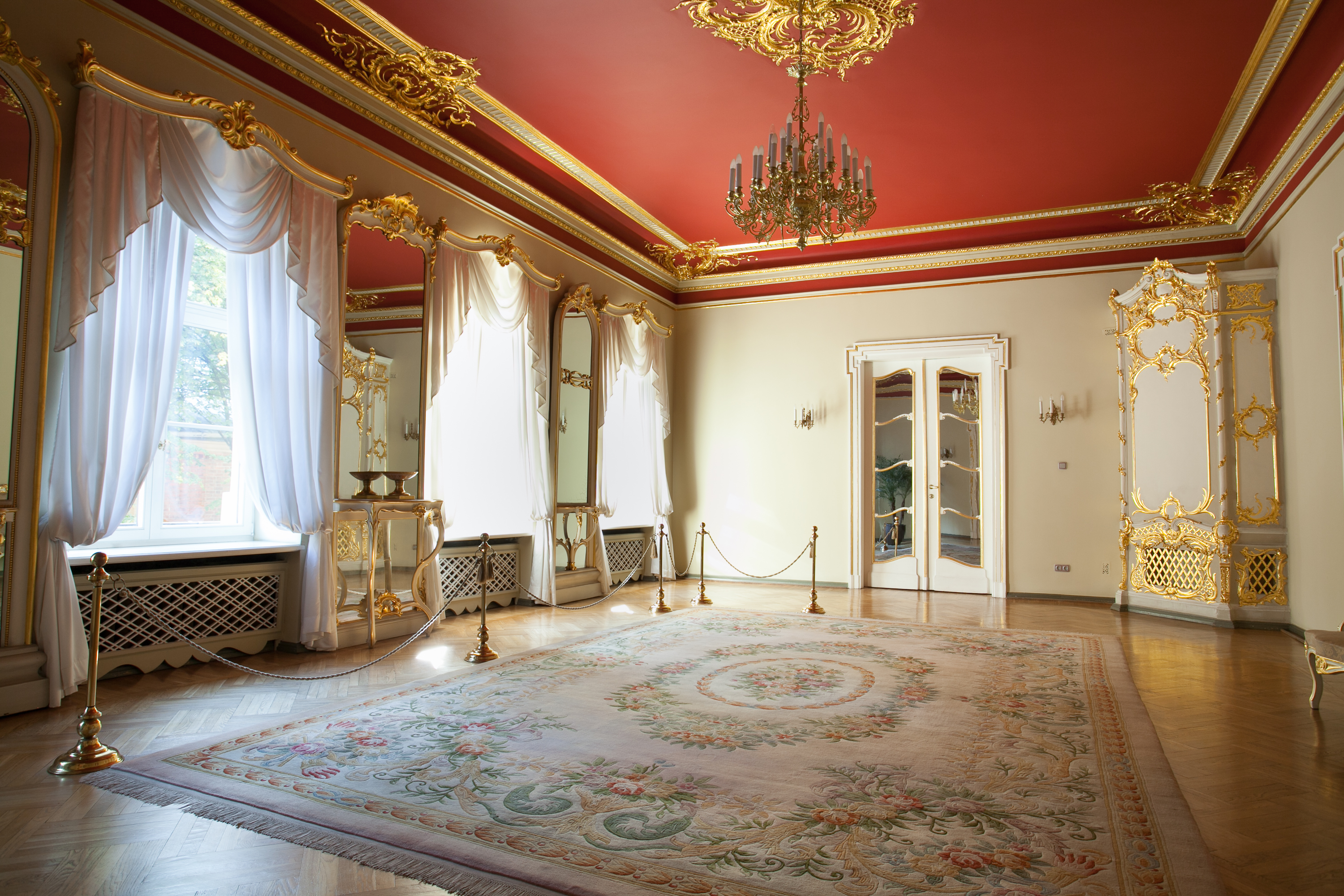
Interior of the House of the Livonian Noble Corporation

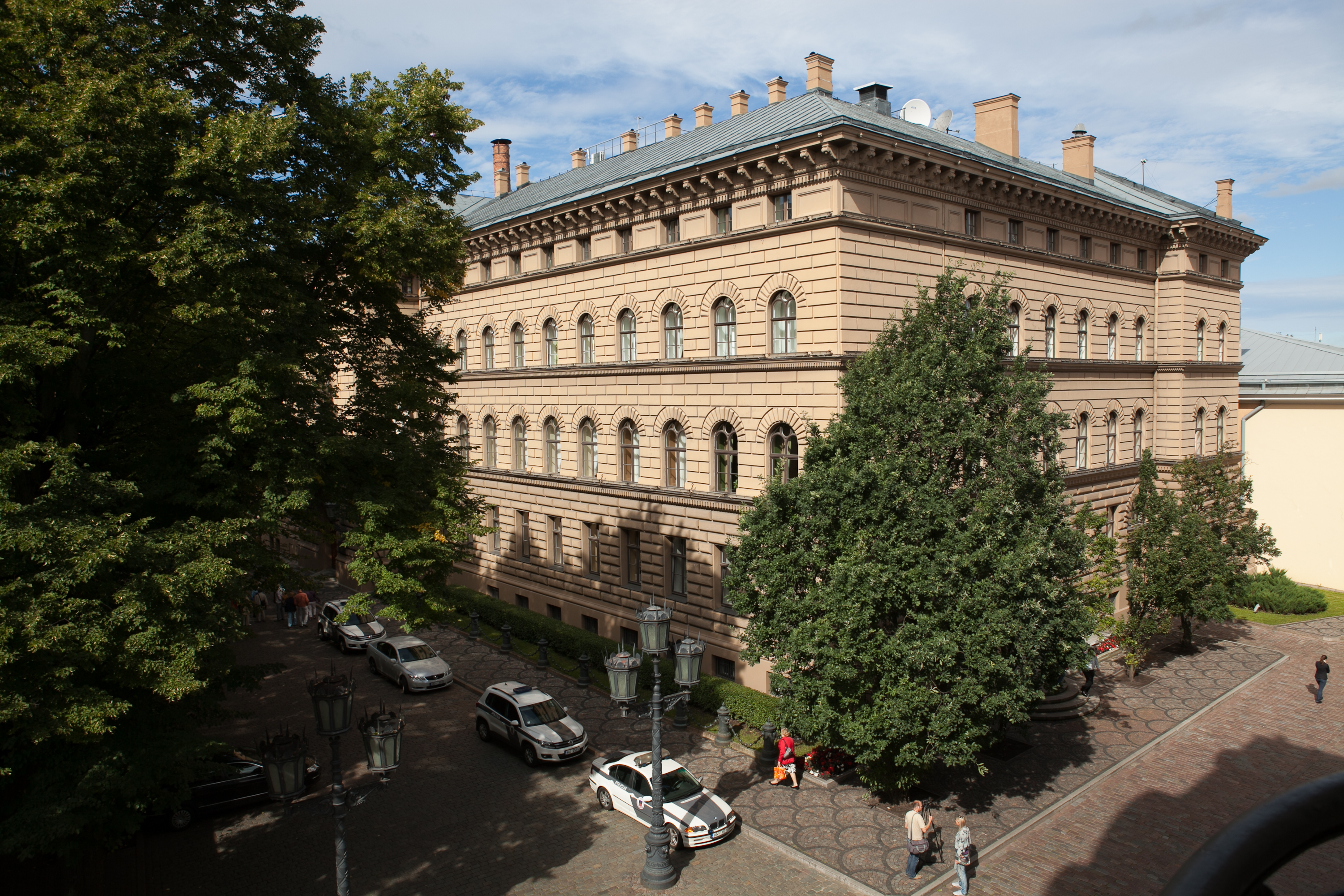
House of the Livonian Noble Corporation, exterior view

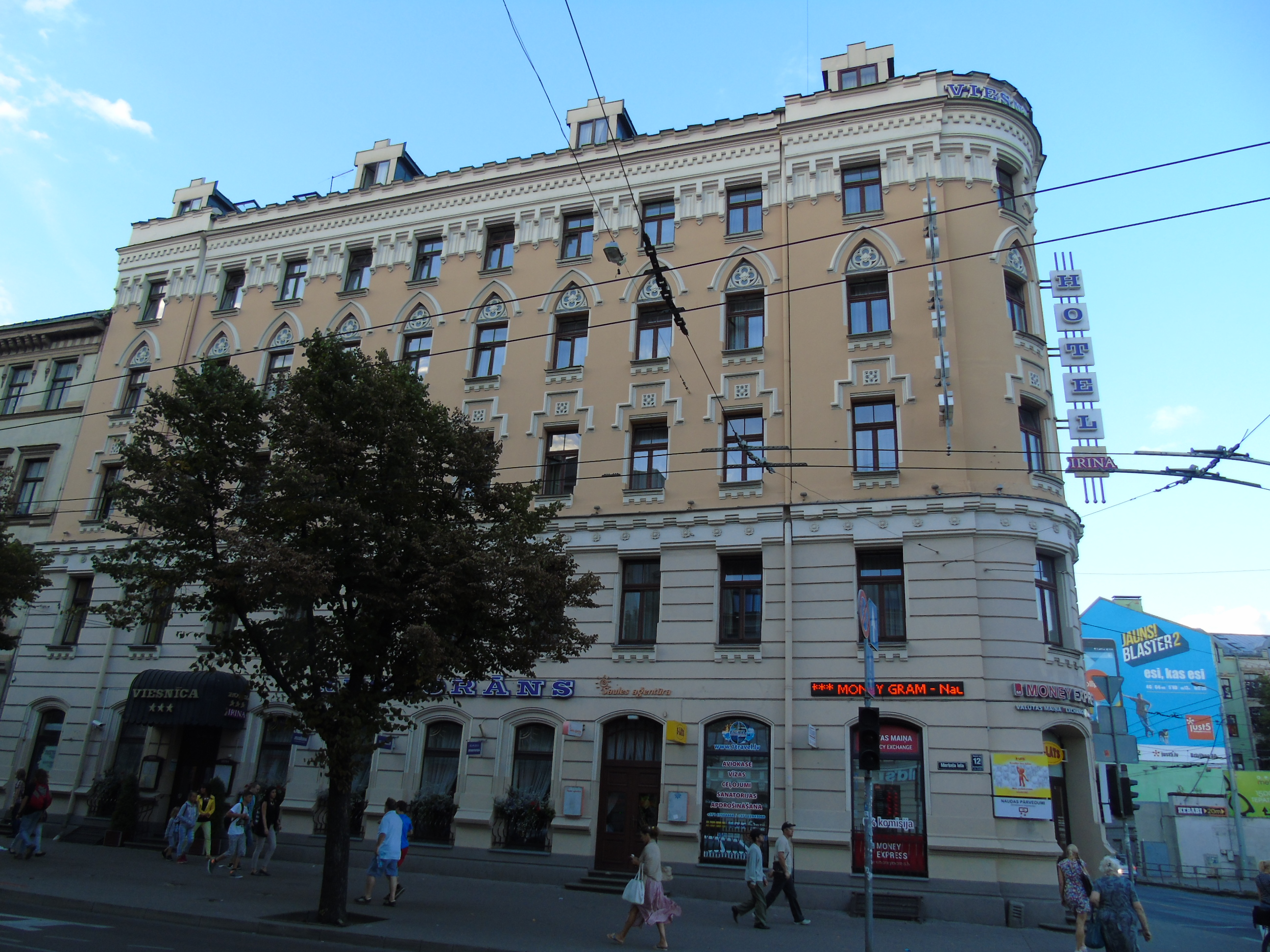
Building on Merķeļa street 12, Riga (1881)

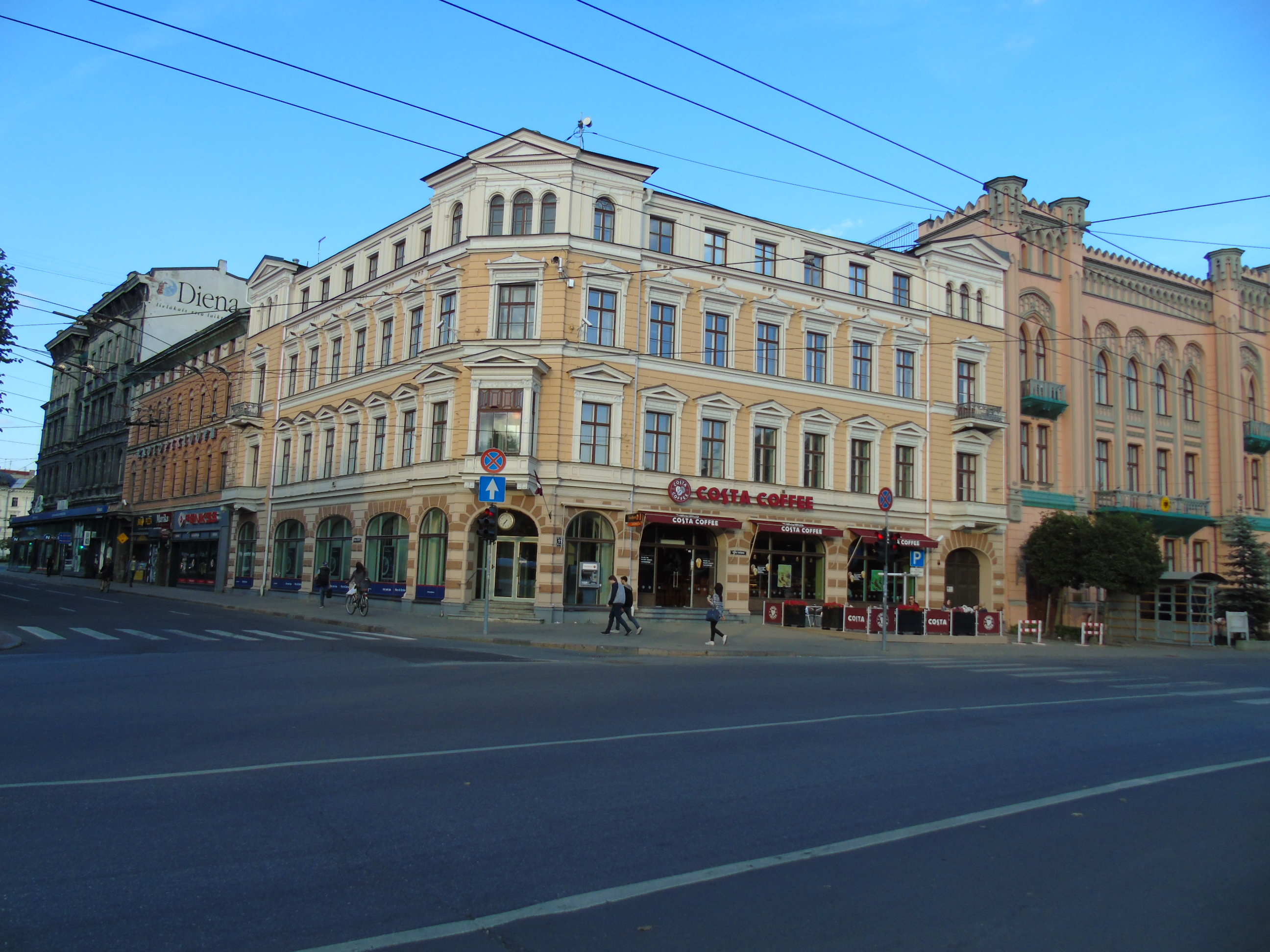
Building on Raiņa boulevard 11, Riga. (1867)
