= The Klaxons (Belgian band) =

Belgian accordion-based band

- Origin: Belgium
- Genres: Folk, world, country pop
- Years active: 1983–1995
- Labels: Hispavox, Polydor, Disques Vogue, Telstar, CBS, Tonican
- Past members: Jean Marie Troisfontaine; Burt Blanca; Roger Verbestel

The Klaxons were a Belgian accordion-based band founded by Burt Blanca who had a minor UK hit in 1983 with "Clap Clap Sound", which reached number 45 in the UK charts, number 18 on the New Zealand Singles Chart and number 1 on the South African Springbok Singles Charts. The track is considered to be a holiday favourite, and is often accompanied by a dance routine, involving clapping.

They have released two albums: 1984's Clap Clap Sound, and 1995's Woogie Boogie.

== Discography ==
=== Studio albums ===
Year	Title	Label	Charts
1984	Clap Clap Sound Track listing: 1. "Clap-Clap Sound" – 2:56; 2. "Rodeoliday" – 1:55; 3. "Three Fontains" – 3:23; 4. "Da-Da-Da" – 3:15; 5. "La Paloma" – 3:47; 6. "Kisses" – 2:42; 7. "Funny Drummer March" – 2:45; 8. "Rippiedance" – 2:35; 9. "Kindertraum" – 2:01; 10. "Run Around" – 2:47; 11. "Mad Postman" – 2:50; 12. "Twist A Billy" – 3:05	Hispavox	AUS #68
1995	Woogie Boogie Track listing: 1. "Klaxecho (Boogie Woogie)"; 2. "Gretel"; 3. "Cassiopee"; 4. "Fiesta de la playa" 5. "Flyin' Tomohawk"; 6. "The Sound of Paris"; 7. "How Do You Do"; 8. "Funny Bird"; 9. "Chicago Avenue"; 10. "Only For You"; 11. "The Cow Cow Square Dance"; 12. "Tyrololohiday"; 13. "Padischa Polka"; 14. "The Buzzers"	Tonican	

=== Singles ===
Year	Title	Label	Charts
1983	"Clap Clap Sound" / "Rippie Dance"	Polydor	NZ #18) UK #43, AUS #45
1984	"Kindertraum" / "Twist a Billy"	Disques Vogue	—
1984	"Rodeoliday"	Telstar	—
