= Burt C. Hopkins =

American philosopher

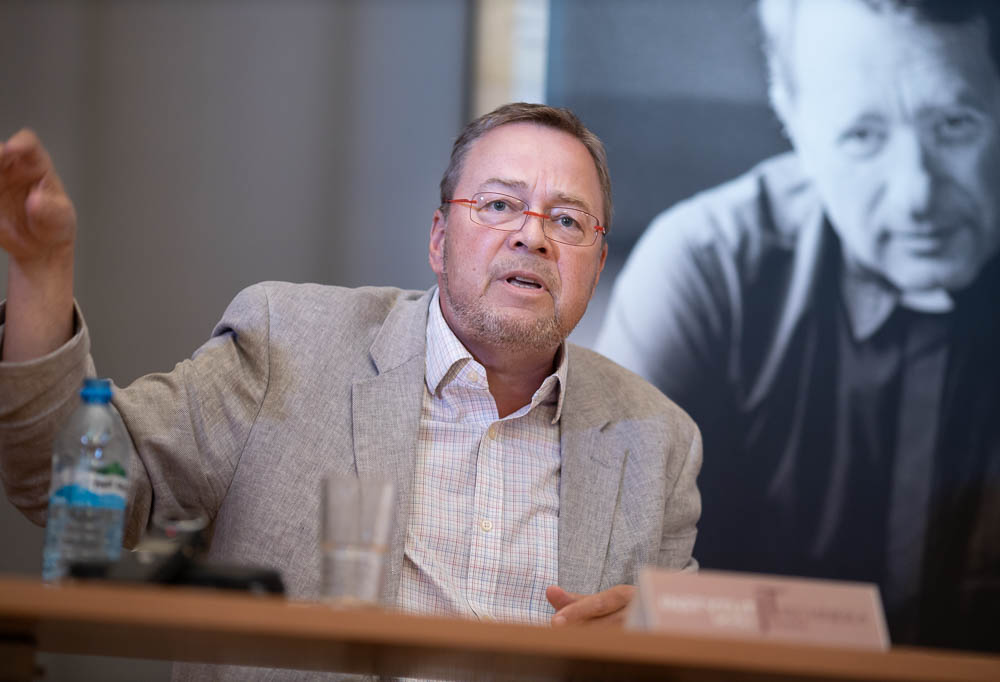
- Born: February 7, 1954 (age 72)

Philosophical work
- Era: Contemporary philosophy
- Region: Western philosophy
- School: Continental philosophy Phenomenology
- Institutions: University of Lille; Seattle University; Ca' Foscari University of Venice
- Main interests: Phenomenology; Philosophy of Mathematics; Edmund Husserl; Jacob Klein; Plato

Burt C. Hopkins (born February 7, 1954) is an American philosopher. He is a Permanent Faculty member of the Summer School of Phenomenology and Phenomenological Philosophy, Ca' Foscari University of Venice, former Professor and Chair of Philosophy at Seattle University (1989–2016) and Permanent Secretary of the Husserl Circle.

He has been visiting professor at the University of Nanjing, China (2013), visiting professor at the School for Advanced Studies in the Social Sciences and the Koyré Center, Paris, France (2015–2017), Senior Fellow at the Sidney M. Edelstein Center for the History and Philosophy of Science, Technology and Medicine, Hebrew University of Jerusalem (2018), visiting professor at École normale supérieure (Paris) and Paris Sciences et Lettres University (2021) and most recently Researcher at the Institute of Philosophy, Czech Academy of Sciences (2019–2020, 2022) and Professor, Faculty of Humanities, Charles University (Prague).

== Biography ==
Hopkins earned his BA in philosophy from Allegheny College in Pennsylvania under the direction of James F. Sheridan, his MA in philosophy at Ohio University under the direction of Algis Mickūnas, and his Ph.D. in philosophy from DePaul University in Chicago under the direction of Parvis Emad. He is founding co-editor (with Steven Crowell) of The New Yearbook for Phenomenology and Phenomenological Philosophy.

== Academic work ==
Hopkins is best known for his work on Husserl and Jacob Klein, although he has also published on Plato, Kant, Heidegger, and Derrida.

His 1993 book Intentionality in Husserl and Heidegger: The Problem of the Original Method and Phenomenon of Phenomenology defends the philosophical superiority of Husserl's transcendental phenomenological method over Heidegger's hermeneutical refashioning of phenomenology's method. Hopkins's general argument is that Heidegger's hermeneutical critique of Husserl's reflective phenomenology of consciousness presupposes the structures of Husserl's phenomenology that are the targets of that critique. According to WorldCat, the book is held in 225 libraries.

His 2010 book The Philosophy of Husserl presents a defense of Husserl's transcendental phenomenology from the critiques of Heidegger and Derrida. It does so by challenging their common claim that Husserl's is historically determined by the limits of Greek ontology and metaphysics. According to WorldCat, the book is held in 2,758 libraries.

His 2011 book, The Origin of the Logic of Symbolic Mathematics: Edmund Husserl and Jacob Klein, compares Klein's largely overlooked Greek Mathematics and the Origin of Algebra (1934 and 1936) with Husserl's concern to provide a philosophical foundation for the formalization of logic and mathematics. According to WorldCat, the book is held in 1,786 libraries.

== Books ==
- The Origin of the Logic of Symbolic Mathematics: Edmund Husserl and Jacob Klein (Bloomington: Indiana University Press, 2011)
- The Philosophy of Husserl (Chesam, UK: Acumen Press and Montreal: McGill University Press, 2010)
- Intentionality in Husserl and Heidegger: The Problem of the Original Method and Phenomenon of Phenomenology (Dordrecht: Kluwer Academic Publishers, 1993)
