= Burt Goldberg =

American academic

Burt Goldberg is a Clinical Professor of Chemistry at New York University. Goldberg received his B.S. from Pace University, an MPhil from Mt. Sinai School of Medicine, and a Ph.D. from the University of Cardiff. Prior to retiring from research, his main area of focus was in microbiology.

== Career ==
He has been a visiting faculty member at Barnard College. He is one of the faculty at NYU to plan to deliver all of his lectures on the web in a general course, with the class time used instead for discussions. His course, "The Body: How It Works" will be first taught in this format in 2011, but the lectures are expected to be available to the public in 2010.

== Achievements and honours ==
He has received the S.H. Hutner Award for Research Contributions to Protozoology (2004) and the Golden Dozen-Teaching Award for Excellence in Undergraduate Teaching at NYU (2006).
