= Riga Circus =

Circus venue in Riga, Latvia

Coordinates: 56.9495°N 24.1194°E

- Rīgas cirks
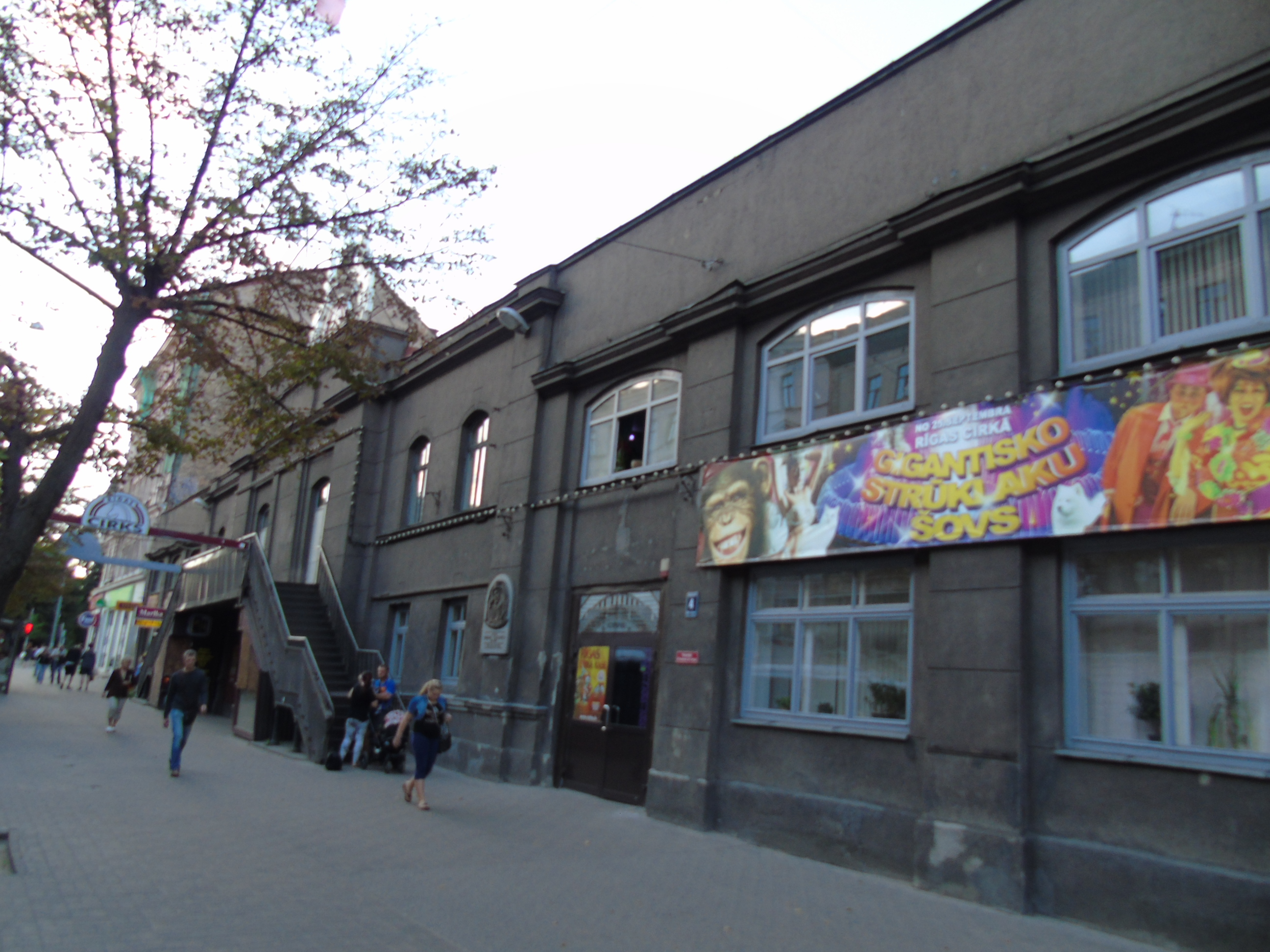
- Riga Circus building in 2015
- Interactive map of Riga Circus
- Address: Merķeļa iela 4 Riga; Latvia
- Owner: Latvian state
- Operator: VSIA "Rīgas cirks"
- Type: Circus and performing arts venue

Construction
- Opened: 29 December 1888
- Renovated: 2022
- Architect: Jānis Frīdrihs Baumanis

Website
- cirks.lv

Riga Circus (Latvian: Rīgas cirks) is a circus venue and state-owned cultural institution in central Riga, Latvia. Its permanent building at 4 Merķeļa Street opened on 29 December 1888 as Salamonsky's Circus and was designed by the Latvian architect Jānis Frīdrihs Baumanis. Architectural and tourism sources describe the building as one of the oldest circus-focused buildings in Europe and as the only permanent circus building in the Baltic states.

The building is listed as a state-protected architectural monument. After a 2016 closure caused by safety concerns, a change in management and the 2017 Latvian ban on the use of wild animals in public performances, Riga Circus was reoriented toward contemporary circus, artist residencies, education and wider performing-arts programming. The first phase of a major reconstruction, designed by the architecture office NRJA, was completed in 2022.

== History ==
Circus performances in the territory of present-day Latvia are recorded from the early 19th century. A temporary wooden circus building was erected in Riga around 1864 near Vērmane Garden. Around 1878, the Prussian-born circus artist and horse trainer Albert Salamonsky arrived in Riga with the intention of building a permanent circus. Before Riga, Salamonsky had established permanent winter circuses in Moscow in 1880 and Odesa in 1888.

The Riga building was completed in 1888 and opened on 29 December of that year. The new venue had capacity for about 1,700 spectators, and the National Encyclopedia describes it as Riga's first building intended for mass leisure. Besides circus performances, it was used for choir concerts, cinema screenings and public meetings. In its early years the programme consisted mainly of performances by foreign circus artists, while local circus professionals began to appear at the end of the 19th century.

After the Soviet occupation of Latvia in 1940, Salamonsky's Circus was nationalised. From 1944 to 1990, the work of circus artists in Latvia was administered within the Soviet circus system, and programmes included both local performers and guest artists. After the restoration of Latvia's independence, the institution continued as Riga Circus. The National Encyclopedia records that it operated as a state enterprise after independence and, from 2014, as a state limited-liability company under the Ministry of Culture.

== Building and architecture ==
Riga Circus was built as a brick building with a round arena. Its unheated dome was designed for equestrian and acrobatic performances and is supported by sixteen columns made from connected railway rails. A 2017 architectural study notes that the building underwent multiple alterations after its original construction, including additions for animals, changes to the façade and Soviet-era modifications.

The building's status as a protected monument is recorded in official preservation instructions for the state architectural monument "Cirks" at Merķeļa Street 4, Riga, with protection number 7637. Architecture sources describe the 2022 reconstruction as an intervention that exposed historical layers rather than concealing them behind new finishes.

== Closure, reorientation and reconstruction ==
In February 2016, the building was closed after the State Construction Control Bureau and the Ministry of Culture concluded that it was unsafe for use. In March 2017, the Ministry of Culture announced Ināra Kehre as the new director of Riga Circus. In June 2017, the Saeima banned the use of wild animals in public performances, including circus shows. The National Encyclopedia describes the Ministry of Culture's 2016 position as a turning point toward a multifunctional and contemporary venue for circus arts, music, dance and interdisciplinary events.

A competition for the restoration of the historic building and development of the site was launched in 2018. The winning proposal by NRJA, developed with architect Ilze Mekša, proposed converting the complex into a multifunctional cultural venue. Public Broadcasting of Latvia reported in 2022 that the reconstruction was nearing completion and that the renewed arena, spaces and historic entrance were being prepared for the first shows after the works. The reconstructed arena opened in November 2022.

The architectural publication FOLD described the first phase as focused on energy-efficiency improvements, strengthening the foundations and preserving the historical architecture of the circus building. Architizer described the reconstruction as including a new structural solution for the dome while keeping the historic dome structure exposed. The Latvian Architecture Award archive lists the reconstruction of the Riga Circus historical arena as a 2022 project by NRJA at Merķeļa Street 4.

== Activities ==
Riga Circus has been redeveloped as a contemporary circus and performing-arts institution rather than only as a traditional circus venue. Public Broadcasting of Latvia described the institution in 2025 as having been relaunched as a state-owned enterprise in 2017 with a strategy for the historic building and for the institution itself, including circus education and international artist residencies. FEDEC, the European Federation of Professional Circus Schools, lists VSIA Rigas Cirks as a partner member and states that Riga Circus School was founded in 2017 to promote access to circus education in Latvia and the Baltic states.
