= Burt Doo =

American businessman

Burton "Burt" Doo
- Born: May 29, 1930; Cambridge, MA
- Died: November 25, 2013 (aged 83)
- Education: Boston University
- Occupations: COO, Barrett Technology

Burton Doo (born May 29, 1930 in Cambridge, Massachusetts) was chief operating officer at robotics company Barrett Technology from 2001 until his death on November 25, 2013. He mentored a line of protégés in the art of business. He began his career in the GE operations management program after graduating from Boston University with a BA in management. In 1970, Doo co-founded Altron, an advanced contract manufacturer, where he served as executive vice president. In 1998 Altron merged with Sanmina, and Doo retained his position as executive vice president until his retirement in 2000.

== Sources ==
Barrett Technology Site

"Title: Burton Doo to head up Barrett operations". Industrial Robot. 28 (6). December 2001. ISSN 0143-991X.

Dunn, Darrell (1998). "Sanmina to buy Altron for $219M". Electronic Buyers' News. General OneFile Web.
