= National Circus Project =

- Company type: Non-profit
- Industry: Circus arts education
- Founded: 1984
- Founder: JeanPaul Jenack, Meryl Schaffer, Peter Keihm
- Headquarters: Westbury, New York, United States
- Area served: Northeastern United States
- Key people: JeanPaul Jenack, Founder / Meryl Shaffer, Founder / Peter Keihm, Founder / Greg Milstein, Executive Director
- Products: Circus entertainment, circus workshops
- Website: www.nationalcircusproject.com

National Circus Project is a 501(c)(3) not-for-profit educational organization in Westbury, NY, in the United States. The organization was founded in 1984 by JeanPaul Jenack and Meryl Shaffer to teach circus skills in school, as a way to combine physical movement and the arts.

Program specialists are recruited from the professional circus world, variety arts and educational organizations, such as physical education colleges and the Academy of Circus Arts in the UK. On May 22, 1990, the United States House of Representatives issued a commendation to the National Circus Project for "helping to further the cause of international understanding" through an international artist exchange program, bringing artists from China, England, Australia, Latvia, and Russia.

== Statistics ==
- Total show audience - 3,558,290
- Total student/camper performances - 784
- Total student/camp audience- 307,440
- Total circus workshops - 55,068
- Total circus workshops participants - 1,974,256
- Total participants - 5,839,683
