= Burt Neuborne =

American lawyer (born 1941)

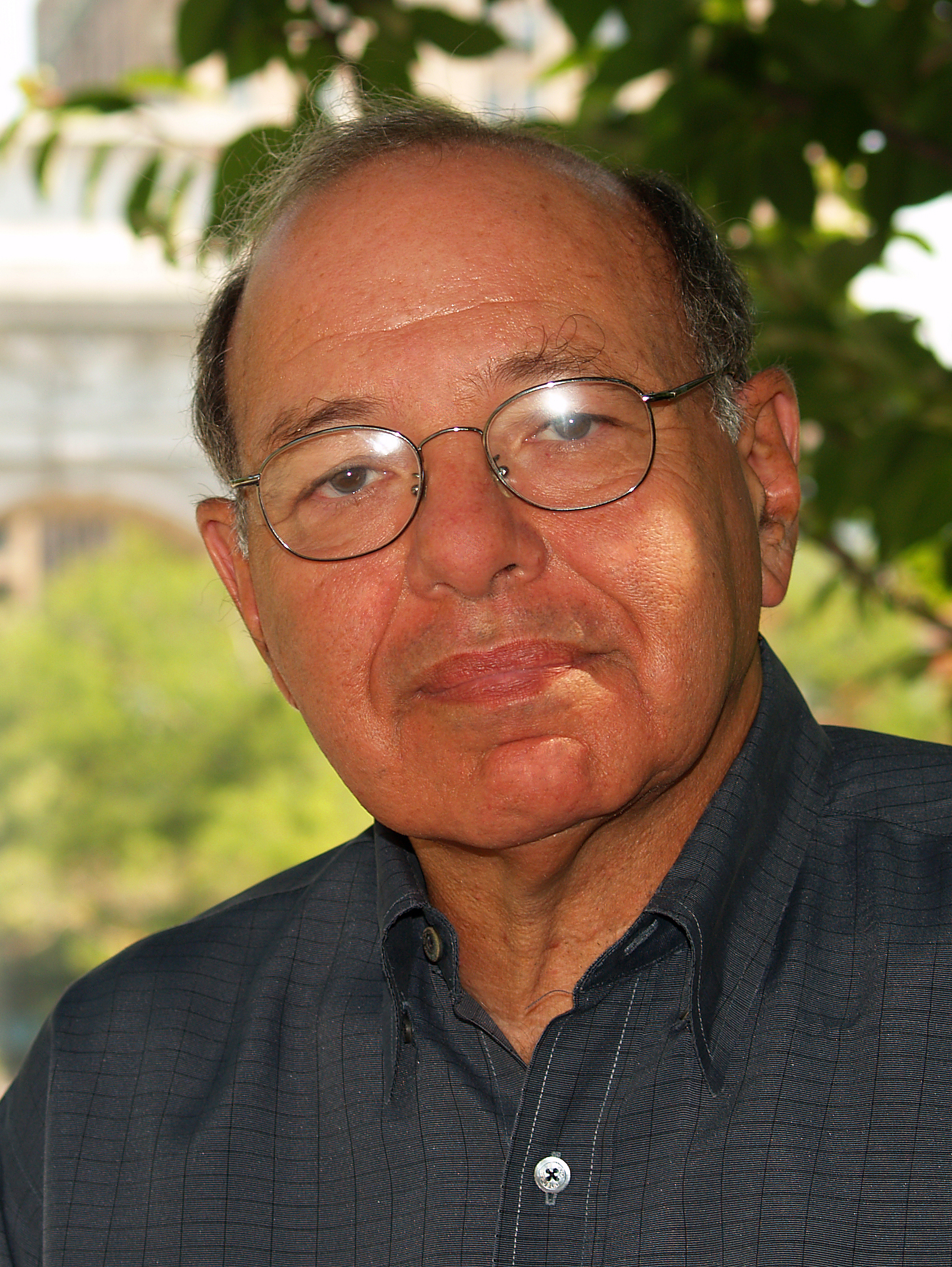
- Neuborne in 2007
- Born: The Bronx, New York, U.S.
- Education: Harvard Law School; Cornell University
- Scientific career
- Fields: Civil liberties
- Workplaces: New York University School of Law

Burt Neuborne is an American lawyer, who is the Norman Dorsen Professor of Civil Liberties at New York University School of Law and the founding legal director of the Brennan Center for Justice.

== Early life and education ==
Neuborne was born in the Bronx, New York, and raised in Greenpoint, Brooklyn.

== Career ==
Neuborne served as national legal director of the American Civil Liberties Union from 1981 to 1986, special counsel to the NOW Legal Defense and Education Fund from 1990 to 1996, and as a member of the New York City Human Rights Commission from 1988 to 1992. From 1995 to 2007, he directed the legal program of the Brennan Center for Justice.

Neuborne has been called a defender of unpopular causes. He defended Air Force pilots who refused to bomb Cambodia in the Vietnam War, securing a temporary injunction from a district court judge against the bombing. Neuborne also represented the Socialist Labor Party's effort to be on the ballot, and legal-aid lawyers suing the government. He has also testified before Congress on behalf of the tobacco industry.

== Holocaust Reparations Case ==
After the death of his daughter, Lauren, Neuborne fell into a depression. He was introduced to the plaintiffs of a massive Holocaust Reparations case and in 1998 Neuborne won a $1.25 billion settlement for Jewish Holocaust survivors in a lawsuit against Swiss banks who helped the Nazis steal money from Jewish victims. After undertaking the initial litigation pro bono, Neuborne gave notice that he intended to be paid for his work on the settlement. He applied for $4.1 million in fees for "8,000 hours over the past seven years" of work he did in the settlement against the banks. Some Holocaust survivor organizations in the United States filed an objection to Neuborne's claim. The editorial board of The New York Times admonished Neuborne, stating, "The dollar amounts are troubling and so are the slipshod hourly records that Mr. Neuborne submitted," and criticizing his $700 hourly rate as "unseemly" and more suited to corporate clients. The Times also criticized the survivors for expecting "arduous, complicated legal work without pay." When asked about the controversy, Neuborne said, "At the end of my career, to have to listen to people say, 'You lied to us, you cheated, you did this to us!'...it hurts, especially since they are survivors."

Neuborne was acquitted by professional review boards and judges involved in the case itself. According to Neuborne, he never intended to donate the time he spent administering the case settlement and, indeed, pursuant to his other responsibilities, could not have.

== Publications ==
Books

- When at Times the Mob Is Swayed: A Citizen’s Guide to Defending Our Republic (The New Press, 2019)
- Madison's Music: On Reading the First Amendment (The New Press, 2015)
- Building a Better Democracy: Reflections on Money, Politics and Free Speech-A Collection of Writings by Burt Neuborne (Brennan Center for Justice, 2002)
- The Values of Campaign Finance Reform (Brennan Center for Justice, 1997)
- Political and Civil Rights in the United States - Volume II (1979) (with Paul Bender, Norman Dorsen and Sylvia Law)
- Political and Civil Rights in the United States - Volume I (1976) (ed. with Paul Bender and Norman Dorsen)
- The Rights of Candidates and Voters: The Basic ACLU Guide for Voters and Candidates (Avon Books, 1976) (with Arthur Eisenberg)

Articles

- "Limiting the Right to Buy Silence: A Hearer-Centered Approach," 90 U. Colo. L. Rev. 411 (2019)
- "A Tale of Two Hands: One Clapping; One Not," 50 Ariz. St. L.J. 831 (2018)
- "The Status of the Hearer in Mr. Madison’s Neighborhood," 25 Wm. & Mary Bill Rts. J. 897 (2017)
- "Achieving Results—Lessons from Civil Rights Movements: Transcript," 19 N.Y.U. J. Legis. & Pub. Pol'y 509 (2016) (with Bebe Anderson, Peggy Cooper Davis and Richard Blum)
- "Where's the Fire?," 25 J.L. & Pol'y 131 (2016)
- "Ending Lochner Lite," 50 Harv. C.R.-C.L. L. Rev. 183 (2015)
- "One-State/Two-Votes: Do Supermajority Senate Voting Rules Violate the Article V Guaranty of Equal State Suffrage?," 10 Stan. J. C.R & C.L 27 (2014)
- "The Bond Between Left and Right Libertarians," 8 N.Y.U. J. L. & Liberty 1040 (2014)
- "A Plague on Both Their Houses: A Modest Proposal for Ending the Ecuadorian Rainforest Wars," 1 Stan. J. Complex Litig. 509 (2013)
- "General Jurisdiction, Corporate Separateness and the Rule of Law," 66 Vand. L. Rev. En Banc 95 (2013)
- "Review, Taking Hearers Seriously," 91 Tex. L. Rev. 1425 (2013)
- "Of 'Singles' Without Baseball: Corporations as Frozen Relational Moments," 64 Rutgers U. L. Rev. 769 (2012)
- "Felix Frankfurter's Revenge: An Accidental Democracy Built by Judges," 35 N.Y.U. Rev. L. & Soc. Change 602 (2011)
- "First Amendment Freedom of Speech and Religion–October 2009 Term," 27 Touro L. Rev. 63 (2011) (with Michael Dorf)
- "Serving the Syllogism Machine: Reflections on Whether Brandenburg Is Now (or Ever Was) Good Law," 44 Tex. Tech L. Rev. 1 (2011)
- "Gravitational Pull of Race on the Warren Court," 2010 Sup. Ct. Rev. 59
- "The October 2008 Term: First Amendment and Then Some," 26 Touro L. Rev. 465 (2010)
- "Voting Rights and Freedom of Speech Decisions from the October 2007 Term," 25 Touro L. Rev. 553 (2009)
- "Campaign Finance and Political Gerrymandering Decisions in the October 2005 Term," 22 Touro L. Rev. 939 (2007)
- "Hommage à Louis Favoreu," 5 Int'l J. Const. L. 17 (2007)
- "Spheres of Justice: Who Decides?," 74 Geo. Wash. L. Rev. 1090 (2006)
- "Of Pragmatism and Principle: A Second Look at the Expulsion of Elizabeth Gurley Flynn From the ACLU's Board of Directors," 41 Tulsa L. Rev. 799 (2005)
- "The Role of Courts in Time of War," 29 N.Y.U. Rev. L. & Soc. Change 555 (2005)
- "Senate Proposal on Drug Importation Treads on Constitutional Rights," 1 Andrews Pat. Litig. Rep. 14 (2004)
- "The House Was Quiet and the World Was Calm the Reader Became the Book," 57 Vand. L. Rev.2007 (2004)
- "Holocaust Reparations Litigation: Lessons for the Slavery Reparations Movement," 58 N.Y.U. Ann. Surv. Am. L. 615 (2003)
- "Is There a Theory in this Class?," 35 Conn. L. Rev. 1519 (2003)
- "Preliminary Reflections on Aspects of Holocaust-era Litigation in American Courts," 80 Wash. U. L. Q. 795 (2002)
- "Is Money Different?," 77 Tex. L. Rev. 7 (1999)
- "Making the Law Safe for Democracy: A Review of the Law of Democracy," 97 Mich. L. Rev.1578 (1999)
- "Toward a Democracy-Centered Reading of the First Amendment," 73 Nw. U. L. Rev. 4 (1999)
- "The Supreme Court and Free Speech: Love and a Question," 42 St. Louis U. L.J. 3 (1998)
- "Buckley 's Analytical Flaws," 6 J.L. & Pol'y 111 (1997)
- "One Dollar-One Vote: A Preface to Debating Campaign Finance Reform," 37 Washburn L.J. 1 (1997)
- "Judicial Review and Separation of Powers in France and the United States," 57 N.Y.U. L. Rev.363 (1982)
- "The Myth of Parity," 90 Harv. L. Rev. 1105 (1977)
