= Burt Wilson =

American musician (1933–2021)

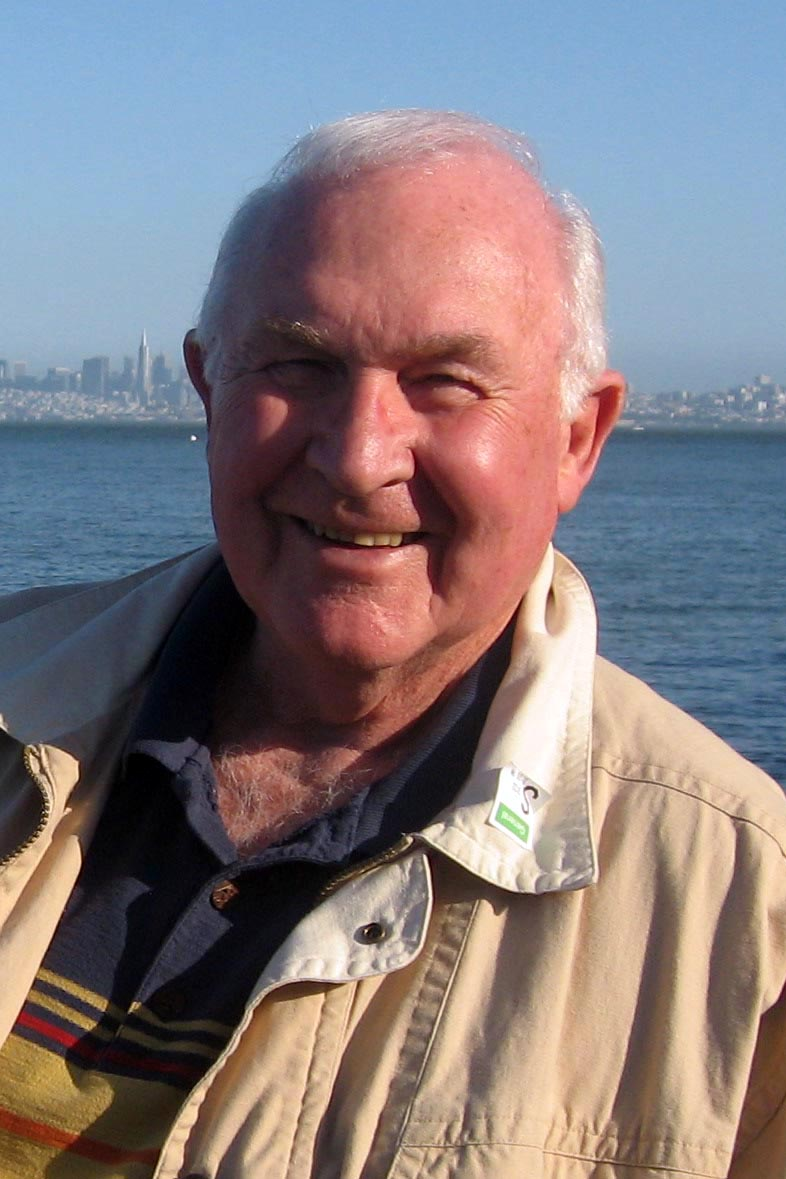
- Wilson in 2008
- Born: Burt John Wilson; January 24, 1933 Stockton, California, U.S.
- Died: January 6, 2021 (aged 87) New Berlin, New York, U.S.
- Occupation: Philosopher, writer, broadcaster, jazz musician, political activist, and advertising executive
- Children: Steven Ashley Wilson

Burt John Wilson (January 24, 1933 – January 6, 2021) was an American philosopher, writer, broadcaster, jazz musician, political activist, playwright, and advertising executive.

== College ==
Wilson received a B.A. degree in Telecommunications from the University of Southern California in 1955. While at USC, Wilson served as the writer and announcer for the pre-game and halftime activities, in the Los Angeles Memorial Coliseum, for the Spirit of Troy, the USC Trojan Marching Band, under the direction of Tommy Walker. On October 30, 1954, Wilson was involved in an accident where a steel tower collapsed at USC's Bovard Field during a morning rehearsal for Band Day featuring a musical tribute on the 100th birthday of Bandmaster John Philip Sousa. There were about 20 people on the platform. Wilson was taken to the Georgia Street Hospital with injuries to his head, abdomen, and legs. After receiving treatment, Wilson asked the police to drive him to the USC-Oregon State game, at the coliseum, where he announced the pre-game and half-time band activities from memory.

In his Junior year, Wilson produced the annual inter-fraternity variety show "Trolios" which was staged at the huge Shrine Auditorium, near the USC campus. In his Senior year, Wilson wrote and staged his fraternity's (Theta Chi) Trolios entry, "Social Probation Blues" which won third place in the show. 25 fraternities had entered.

Wilson was also a founding member of Tau Alpha Sigma (TAS), USC's professional communications fraternity.

== Career and Public Service ==
=== Army ===
Wilson served in the U.S. Army, in Germany, as a radio announcer and soldier show producer from 1955 to 1958. While he was with Special Services, he produced the Broadway musical, Kiss Me, Kate, and toured it to many army bases around Europe. Wilson was cast as a captain in the Citizen Soldier TV Series' episode, "The Defense of St. Vith", produced by Charles Marquis Warren, who would later go on to produce the well known Rawhide TV series. Wilson also served as army talent scout for producer Warren, supplying actors for the Citizen Soldier series. One of Wilson's "finds" was John Erwin who did five leads in the series and later starred as Teddy on Rawhide. Erwin would later become famous as the voice of Morris the Cat, as well as the voice of various cartoon characters, and starring in movie roles.

=== Advertising ===
Wilson's advertising career runs concurrently with his public service projects. After his return from Germany, Wilson worked as a commercial copywriter at KXOA radio and commercial writer/producer at KCRA-TV in Sacramento, California. He then launched his own advertising agency, MediaScope Advertising, Ltd. Among his many clients was Shakey's Pizza Parlors, where he formed his lifelong friendship with its co-founder, Sherwood "Shakey" Johnson and led to his eventual authoring of the book Shakey and Me. In 1965, wanting the "Los Angeles experience", Wilson moved South and went to work for Boylhart, Lovett and Dean as an account executive. In 1968, Wilson was nominated as "Advertising Man of the Year" by the Western States Advertising Association because of his volunteerism in Watts after the riots. He was beat out by H. R. "Bob" Haldeman who later became Chief of Staff for President Richard Nixon and was later sent to jail because of his involvement in Watergate. In 1969, Wilson made the leap to Creative Director at Needham, Harper, and Steers, a national agency. From NH&S, Wilson moved to the Goodman Organization, an entertainment agency. This provided him with an entrée to American International Pictures where he worked freelance for a number of years creating their broadcast campaigns for such movies as Godzilla vs. the Smog Monster, Frogs, and Dr. Phibes Rises Again. Wilson moved to New York City in 1979 and managed an in-house ad agency for April-Marcus, a national clothing merchandiser. Wilson returned to California in 1981 to act as free media director for the Campaign against the Peripheral Canal. The canal was defeated by a 2/3 vote statewide. In 1983, Wilson was named Director of Advertising for Pleasant Hawaiian Holidays where he managed a 10-person Advertising Department. In 1989, he opened his own television production company in Simi Valley where he wrote and produced industrial videos and cable TV commercials.

=== Public Service ===
In 1966, after the notorious Watts riots, Wilson formed the Watts Revitalization Corps, a non-funded, all-volunteer organization that worked with Watts Community members to improve conditions in the riot-torn area. His six years of work attracted national attention and was praised by then Senator Robert F. Kennedy as an outstanding example of volunteer community involvement.

In 1968, Wilson began producing and hosting a public service radio program "What You Can Do For Your Country" on KMET-FM in Los Angeles. He used the program to attract young people to his Revitalization Corps work in Watts. Thousands of high school students came to Watts over the four-year run of the show. Wilson received a prestigious Columbia University Edwin Howard Armstrong award, also known as the "Major Armstrong award", for the program.

In 1970, Wilson was asked by the Taos, New Mexico Indian Pueblo (who had heard him on the radio) to help in their struggle to gain title to their sacred Blue Lake religious lands and prevent a government take-over of this sanctuary. Wilson organized a media tour in and around Los Angeles for the tribal leadership. It was the first time the tribal leadership had left the pueblo in 5,000 years. For his successful efforts, Wilson was awarded a ceremonial blanket and made a brother of the pueblo.

In 1973, Wilson worked in Coachella, California, with César Chávez during the Delano grape strike. Wilson helped organize farm workers and did publicity and PR for the Union, while working out of the UFW Union Hall in Coachella's grapefruit-growing area. He was a frequent guest on the local radio station and held media conferences for the press.

In the mid-1970s, Wilson became a co-coordinator of the Los Angeles-based organization CAUSE (Campaign Against Utility Service Exploitation) a coalition of 29 different consumer and activist groups which was successful in fighting an advance payments plan by ARCO and the Southern California Gas Company. He gained national attention when CAUSE secured a $1-billion victory and forced the gas company to make restitution to its users. Following this victory, CAUSE exposed the phone company's giving out of unlisted numbers to unapproved agencies and led the fight to keep natural gas tankers out of Los Angeles harbor.

In 1977, Wilson ran for State Assemblyman from the 46th District, in Los Angeles County. He came in third in a 17-candidate race. Later that year, Wilson was overwhelmingly voted to the Los Angeles County Democratic Committee. That year he was also elected as the Southern vice-president of the CDC, the California Democratic Council.

In 1981–2, as a political campaign activist, Wilson played a major role as Media Director in the defeat of the Peripheral Canal proposition, a measure which would have diverted Northern California water South by means of the construction of a huge, cement canal that was considered to be environmentally adverse. The proposition was defeated by a 2/3 vote statewide.

In 1982, after the Peripheral Canal campaign, Wilson signed on as Press Secretary to Dr. Wilson Riles' try at a fourth term as State Superintendent of Public Instruction. Riles lost.

In 1984, Wilson was among 108 community activists in a successful ACLU lawsuit against the Public Disorder and Intelligence Division of the Los Angeles Police Department for illegal surveillance. The suit was successfully prosecuted and was settled by the LAPD for $1.3 million.

In 1999, Wilson moved to Binghamton, New York, to work with the Citizen Action organization under the leadership of Mary Clark. While there, Wilson exposed the actions of State Senator Tom Libous (R-Binghamton) who was selling sport clothing out of his senate office and using his free senate frank to send out brochures. Wilson brought this to the attention of local media and thus forced Libous to give up this little side show shopping effort. The senate ethics committee chose not to prosecute.

Since 2006, Wilson had been fighting against a plan to build twin tunnels in the Sacramento Delta which could drain and ruin the Delta. He established a blog titled the "Public Water New Service" in order to correct misconceptions the water agencies are using to influence the public. His blog is read by thousands throughout California.

Along with his continuing activism, Wilson has written for the Los Angeles FREE PRESS, had Op-Ed pieces published in the LOS ANGELES TIMES, the SAN DIEGO UNION, the SACRAMENTO BEE, the SACRAMENTO NEWS AND REVIEW and a letter published in THE NEW YORKER. He has conducted activist-oriented radio talk shows on KPFK and co-hosted a TV program The Citizen Intelligencer on KVST-TV in Los Angeles.

=== Dixieland Jazz ===
Wilson has appeared as a guest artist in many Sacramento Dixieland Jazz Jubilees over the past 40 years. He plays piano, trombone, ukulele, and sings. Wilson is mentioned in the jazz musician's reference book, "Jazz West 1945–1985: The A-Z Guide to West Coast Jazz Music", authored by K. O. Eckland, for leading the first traditional Jazz Band (The Silver Dollar Jazz Band) ever to be hired to play at the very first Shakey's Pizza Parlor at 57th and J Streets in Sacramento, California, in 1955. Eckland wrote "This large, [Lu] Watters-type jazz band led the jazz revival in Sacramento."

=== Philosophy ===
In 1966, Wilson was introduced to the teaching of Agni Yoga through a friend. He met his guru, Ralph Harris Houston, in October of that same year and became his disciple in 1968. He credits Houston as inspiring him to fight injustice and serve the community as a consumer and political activist. In 1990, after the death of renowned American philosopher Manly Palmer Hall, a long-time friend of his guru, Wilson was invited to fulfill some of Hall's speaking engagements at the Philosophical Research Society (PRS) in Los Angeles. Wilson became a prominent lecturer on esoteric metaphysics at PRS and was elected to the board of trustees of the society the following year.

=== Projects ===
Wilson moved back to his home town of Sacramento in 2000. For the past 12 years, Wilson has written and produced a weekly television program called "Ancient Wisdom for the 21st Century" in which he covers esoteric subjects, explaining the many different tenets of the Ancient (Pre-Christian) Wisdom. His program is the most-watched program on the Access Channel in Sacramento and can be watched at 9:00 PM PST on Thursday nights at www.accesssacramento.org—click on "Watch Ch. 17."

In 2004, Wilson's video production of "The Roots of Sacramento Jazz" was featured in the "A Place Called Sacramento" film festival.

In 2005, Wilson was asked to participate in the UCLA Oral History Project concerning his consumer and political activism.

In 2007, Wilson was featured nationally in the Ken Burns documentary film, The War. His role was to explain how a 10-year old viewed the war and tell of his experiences on the home front.

In 2011, another of Wilson's video productions, "CSI: Sacramento", a spoof of the TV series, was featured in the "A Place Called Sacramento" film festival.

From 2011 to 2015, Wilson continued to write books and was well known for his op-ed editorials against the state water agencies' desire to once more divert more water from the Sacramento–San Joaquin River Delta to Southern California by building twin tunnels under the Delta.

Wilson moved back to Binghamton, New York, in 2015 to teach an Agni Yoga class there and work with Citizen Action, a volunteer organization that works for economic justice. Shortly thereafter, he finished his first novel and completed another book with an ancient wisdom religious theme.

== Death ==
Wilson died from complications of COVID-19 on January 6, 2021, at the age of 87, during the COVID-19 pandemic in New York.

== Bibliography ==
Books authored by Mr. Wilson include:

- A History of Sacramento Jazz 1948–1966 (1986)--a memoir of his days as a jazz musician and band leader in Sacramento before the capital city began to host what has become the world's largest annual jazz festival.
- Complete Post Production with the Video Toaster (1996)--a "how to" instruction book for the first computer-based video editing unit.
- Shakey & Me (2001)--An account of the life and times of Shakey's Pizza Parlors founder Sherwood (Shakey) Johnson and all the humorous escapades they both shared.
- The Leader (2007)--a collaboration on a Russian-to-English version of a handbook presented to Russian painter Nicholas Roerich by the Hierarchy for true spiritual leadership.
- The Crucifixion Cover-up (2009)--A highly predictive theory of the nature of crucifixion and how and why it was covered up in the Bible. It is framed in the larger context of Jesus' arrest, trial and crucifixion.
- Everything is Karma (2017)--Wilson not only explains Karma and how it works with the concept of reincarnation and past lives, he gives examples of a lot of different karmic actions and explains the karma of each. It is the definitive book on Karma.
