= Burt Blanca =

Belgian rock and roll musician

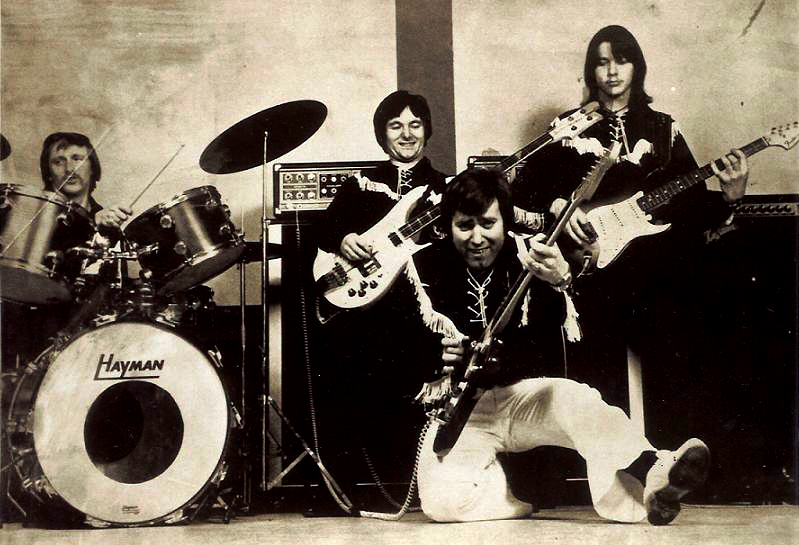
Burt Blanca, 1978

Norbert Arthur Blancke (Neder-Over-Heembeek, 6 August 1944) is a Belgian rock and roll musician. He is best known for the hit singles "Touche pas à mon rock'n'roll", "Ma Guitare bleue", "Le Train Ne Passe Plus Par Là", "Le Locomotion" and, as The Klaxons, "ClapClap Sound".
