= Burt Procter =

American painter

- Born: 1901; Boston, Massachusetts, U.S.
- Died: July 2, 1980 (aged 78–79); Palm Springs, California, U.S.
- Education: Stanford University
- Occupation: Painter
- Spouse: Katherine Procter
- Children: 1 daughter

Burt Procter (1901 – July 2, 1980) was an American painter who specialized in depictions of horses and portraits of Native Americans.

== Life ==
Procter was born in 1901 in Boston, Massachusetts. Procter was known as a child prodigy growing up, and was known for drawing horses at a young age. He attended Stanford University.

Procter was a commercial artist in Los Angeles and later in New York. He was the art director of the Pageant of the Masters for 17 years. He painted horses and portraits of Native Americans, but he "refused to be classified as a Western artist."

Procter resided in Corona del Mar with his wife Katherine. They had a daughter, Virginia. Procter died on July 2, 1980, in Palm Springs, California, at age 79. His artwork can be seen at the Nelson Museum of the West in Cheyenne, Wyoming.
