= Mikimiki =

Mikimiki, a Māori term may refer to one of several species in the genus Coprosma. These include:

- Coprosma areolata
- Coprosma propinqua
- Coprosma linariifolia
- Coprosma rubra
- Coprosma virescens
- Coprosma rigida
- Coprosma dumosa
