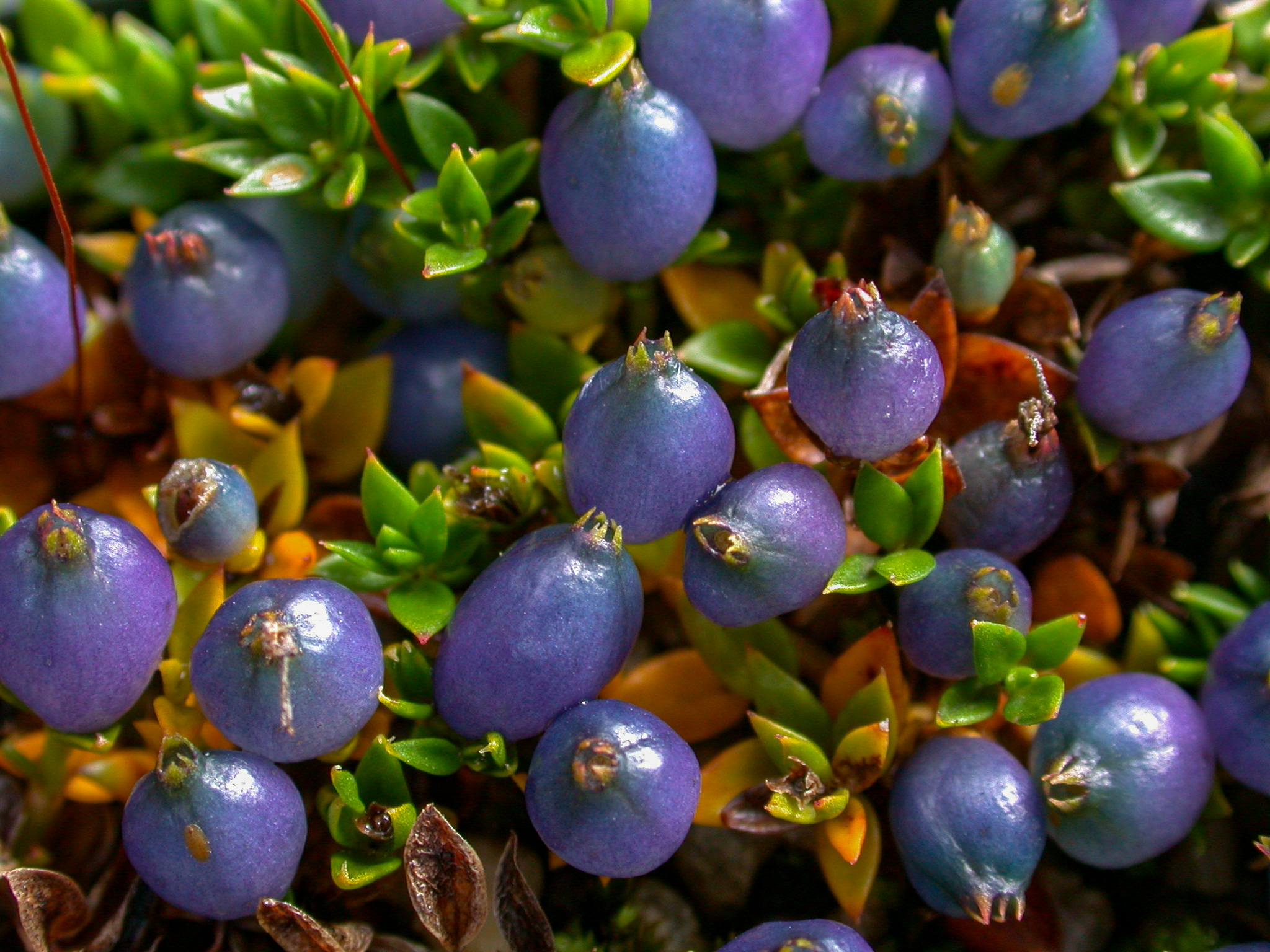

Scientific classification
- Kingdom: Plantae
- Clade: Tracheophytes
- Clade: Angiosperms
- Clade: Eudicots
- Clade: Asterids
- Order: Gentianales
- Family: Rubiaceae
- Genus: Coprosma
- Species: C. moorei

Binomial name
- Coprosma moorei F.Muell. ex Rodway

= Coprosma moorei =

Species of plant

Coprosma moorei, commonly known as blue matcurrant or turquoise coprosma, is a small, mat forming, prostrate shrub in the Rubiaceae family. It is native to highland areas of Tasmania and Eastern Victoria.

== Taxonomy ==
First described by Ferdinand von Mueller in 1891 and named after Mr Thomas Bather Moore who supplied samples from the highlands of Mount Tyndall for the Nation Herbarium of Victoria.

== Description ==
Prostrate, perennial, woody subshrub forming a mat. Stems and leaves opposite. Stems filiform, 5–15 cm long and much branched. Stems rooting at nodes. Leaves thick, glossy, glabrous, ovate to lanceolate, slightly concave, with a pointed apex, 3-5mm long and 1-2.5mm wide. Flowers a creamy green or white colour. Flowers are sessile, bisexual, solitary and terminal on short branchlets. Flowers are small with petals fused to form a corolla tube, 4-5 stamens, and 2 feathery stigmas which protrude from the corolla to allow for wind pollination. Flowering from December to January. Fruit spherical, 2-seeded, blue or mauve drupe, 5mm diameter.

== Distribution ==
Coprosma moorei is found only in the highlands of Tasmania and Eastern Victoria.

It can be found throughout Tasmania in sub-alpine to alpine, moist peaty heaths, and Sphagnum bogs.

In Victoria C. moorei is confined to high altitude, moist peaty heaths, and Sphagnum bogs on the Baw Baw Plateau, Lake Mountain, Snowy Range, Mount Buffalo and Bogong High Plains.

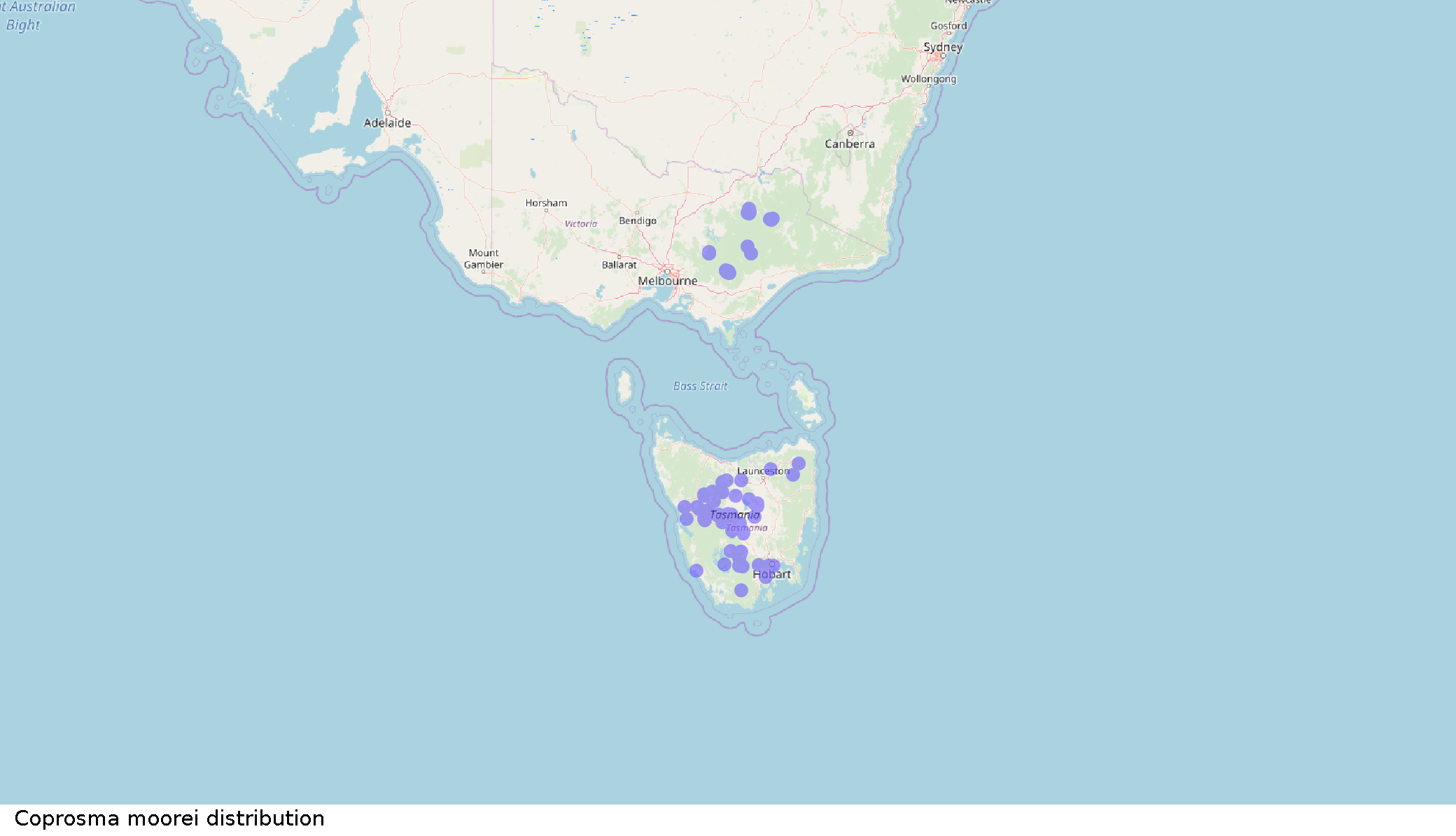
Distribution of Coprosma moorei from Atlas of Living Australia

== Ecology and reproduction ==
Found in wet, peaty heaths or Sphagnum bogs, in alpine or sub-alpine and montane zones from 300–1200 meters above sea level in Tasmania and Eastern Victoria.

Like most members of the Coprosma genus C. moorei is wind pollinated, however, unlike most, it has bisexual flowers.

== Similar species ==
Coprosma moorei can be distinguished by its blue fruit in combination with its geographical range. C. moorei could be confused with C. pumila which has dark red or black fruit and more rounded leaves.

== Cultivation ==
It requires a moist, well-drained soil and full sun or light shade. It can be propagated by seed, cutting or division. It succeeds in most soils with a neutral or slightly acidic pH.
