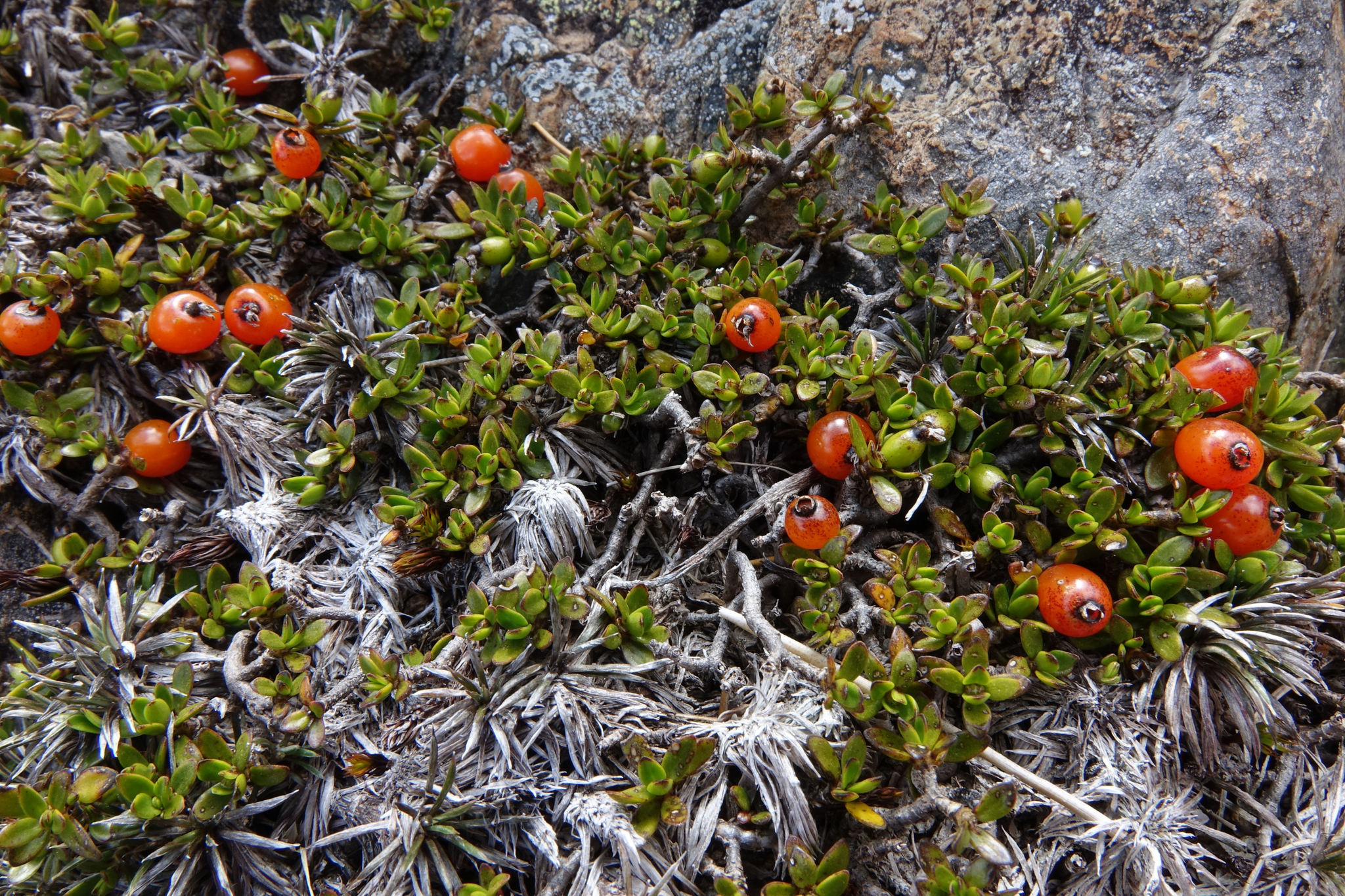

Scientific classification
- Kingdom: Plantae
- Clade: Tracheophytes
- Clade: Angiosperms
- Clade: Eudicots
- Clade: Asterids
- Order: Gentianales
- Family: Rubiaceae
- Genus: Coprosma
- Species: C. niphophila

Binomial name
- Coprosma niphophila Orchard

= Coprosma niphophila =

creeping coprosma

Species of plant

Coprosma niphophila, the creeping coprosma, is a shrub native to Australia and the South Island of New Zealand. The specific epithet (niphophila) is derived from ancient Greek meaning "snow-loving", referring to the alpine habitat of this plant. The type specimen was collected near the Upper Blue Lake Cirque near Mount Kosciuszko, New South Wales.
