= Coprosma pilosa =

Conservation status
- Endangered (EPBC Act)

Scientific classification
- Kingdom: Plantae
- Clade: Embryophytes
- Clade: Tracheophytes
- Clade: Spermatophytes
- Clade: Angiosperms
- Clade: Eudicots
- Clade: Asterids
- Order: Gentianales
- Family: Rubiaceae
- Genus: Coprosma
- Species: C. pilosa

Binomial name
- Coprosma pilosa Endl.

Species of flowering plant in the coffee family

Coprosma pilosa, also known as mountain coprosma, is a flowering plant in the coffee family. It is endemic to the Australian external territory of Norfolk Island in the south-west Pacific Ocean. It was originally described in 1833 by Austrian botanist Stephan Endlicher.

== Description ==
The species grows as a shrub or small tree up to 6 m in height. It has dark green hairy leaves, small green flowers, and cone-shaped, dark bluish-purple fruits. The plants are dioecious, with wind-pollinated flowers and bird-dispersed seeds.

== Distribution and habitat ==
The trees occur in moist upland hardwood forest and pine-hardwood ridge forest, at the higher levels of the Norfolk Island National Park. The species conservation status has been assessed as Endangered.
