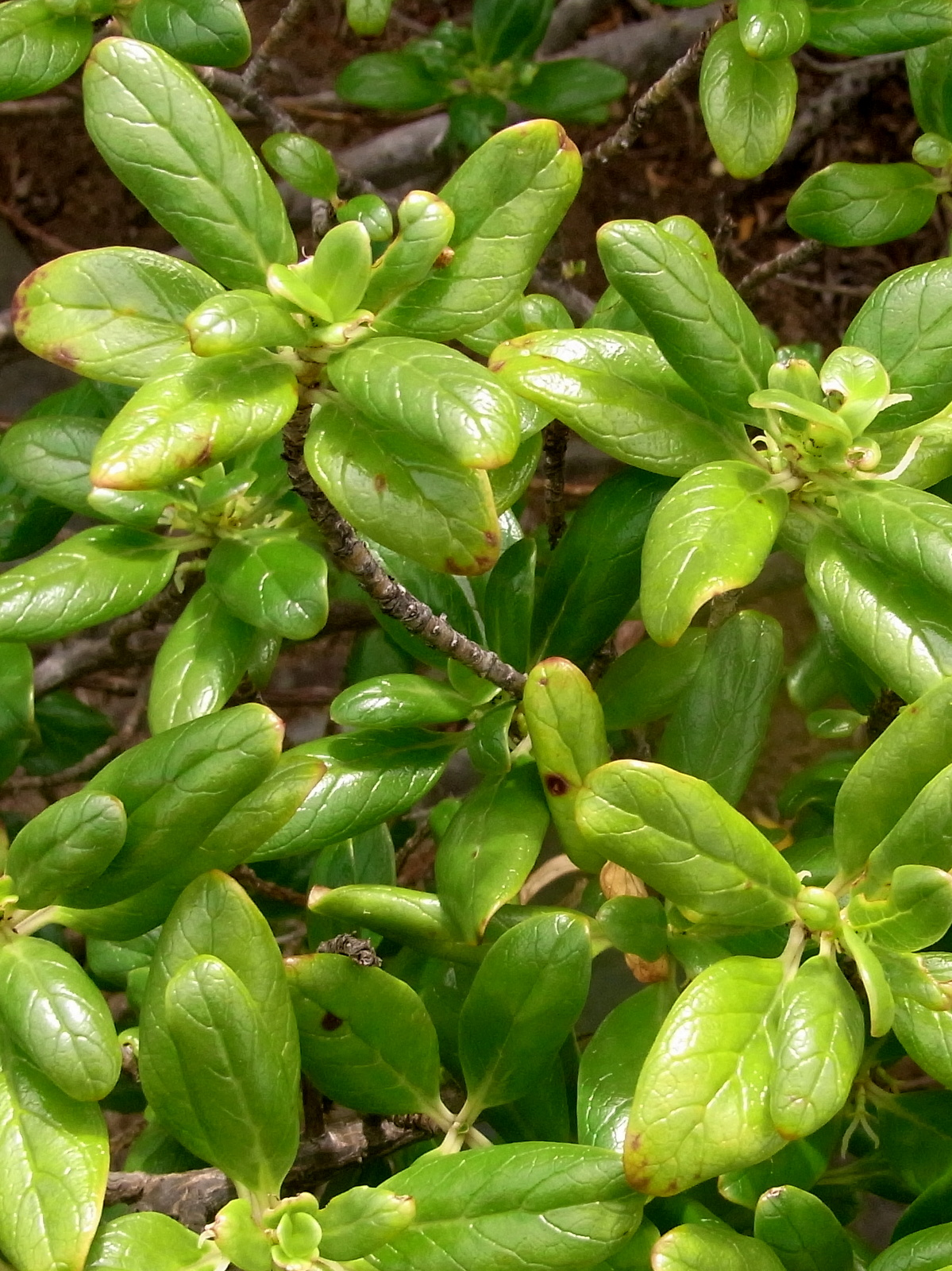

Scientific classification
- Kingdom: Plantae
- Clade: Tracheophytes
- Clade: Angiosperms
- Clade: Eudicots
- Clade: Asterids
- Order: Gentianales
- Family: Rubiaceae
- Genus: Coprosma
- Species: C. prisca

Binomial name
- Coprosma prisca W.R.B.Oliv. (1917)

= Coprosma prisca =

Species of plant

Coprosma prisca, commonly known as goatwood, is a flowering plant in the family Rubiaceae. The Latin specific epithet prisca means “old” or “ancient”, though its application to this species is unknown.

== Description ==
It is a dense shrub growing to 3 m in height. The glossy, bright green, obovate to elliptic leaves are 20–70 mm long, 35 mm wide, with slightly recurved edges. The flowers are small and green, 6–8 mm long. The egg-shaped green fruits are 6–7 mm long. The flowering season is from late August to early October.

== Distribution and habitat ==
The species is endemic to Australia’s subtropical Lord Howe Island in the Tasman Sea. It is common at low elevations along the coast.
