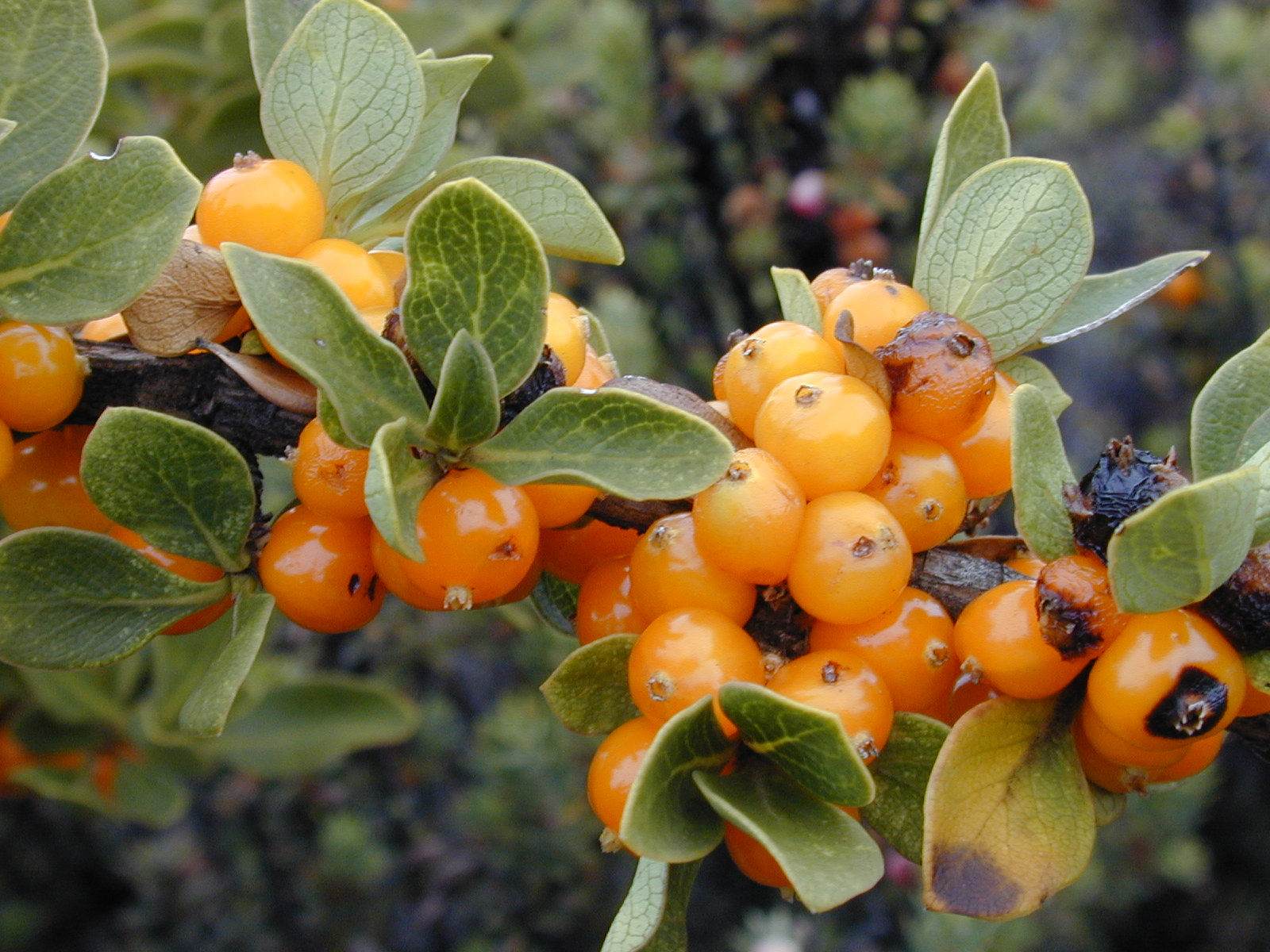
- Fruit
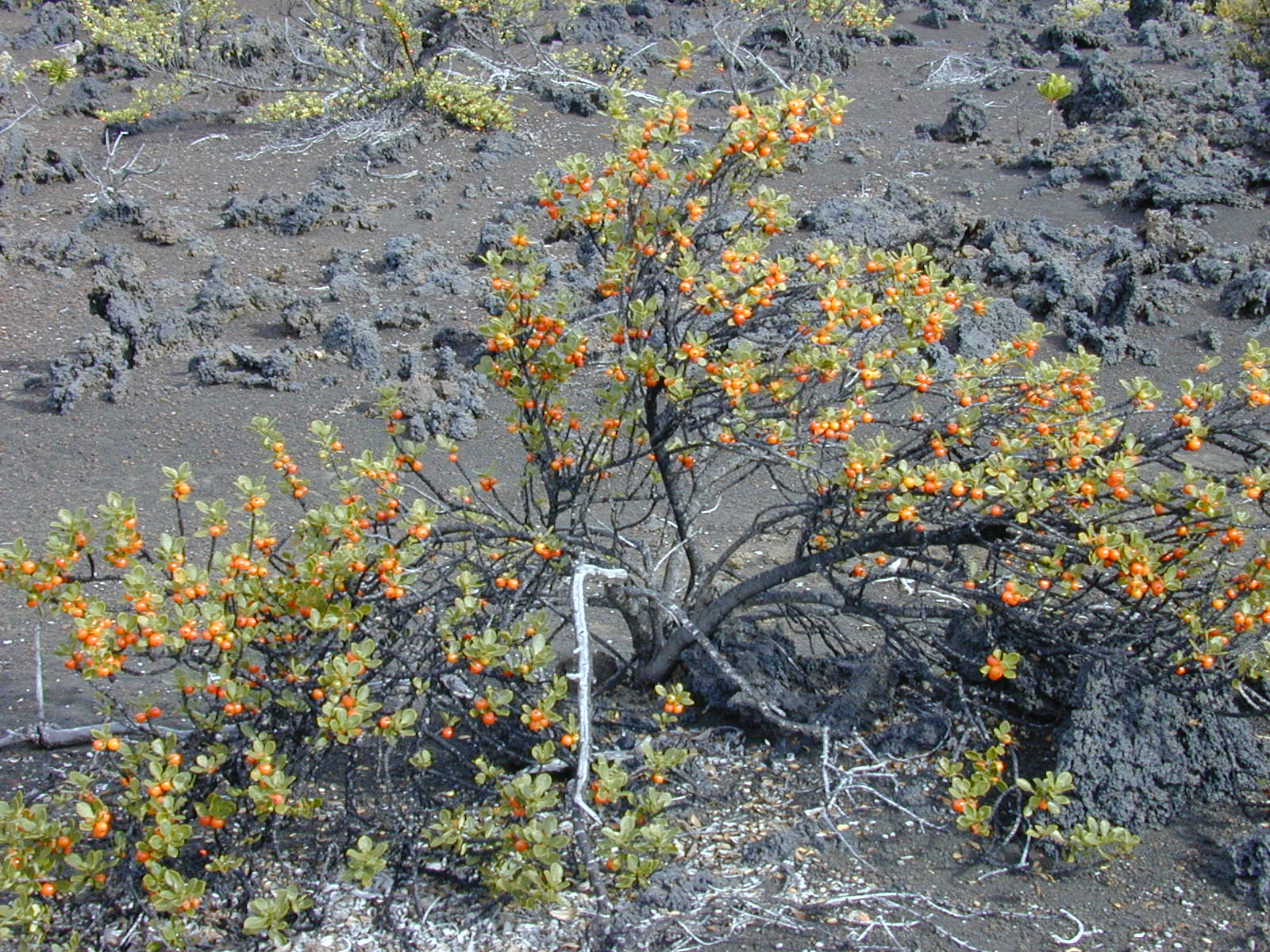
- Habit

Conservation status
- Vulnerable (IUCN 3.1)

Scientific classification
- Kingdom: Plantae
- Clade: Tracheophytes
- Clade: Angiosperms
- Clade: Eudicots
- Clade: Asterids
- Order: Gentianales
- Family: Rubiaceae
- Genus: Coprosma
- Species: C. montana

Binomial name
- Coprosma montana Hillebr.

Synonyms
- Coprosma montana var. crassa W.R.B.Oliv.; Coprosma montana var. orbicularis W.R.B.Oliv.; Coprosma montana var. typica W.R.B.Oliv.

= Coprosma montana =

Species of plant

Coprosma montana, the pilo, is a species of flowering plant in the family Rubiaceae, native to Hawaii. A shrub or small tree, it is found growing at elevations of 6,000 to 10,000 ft (1,800 to 3,000 m).
