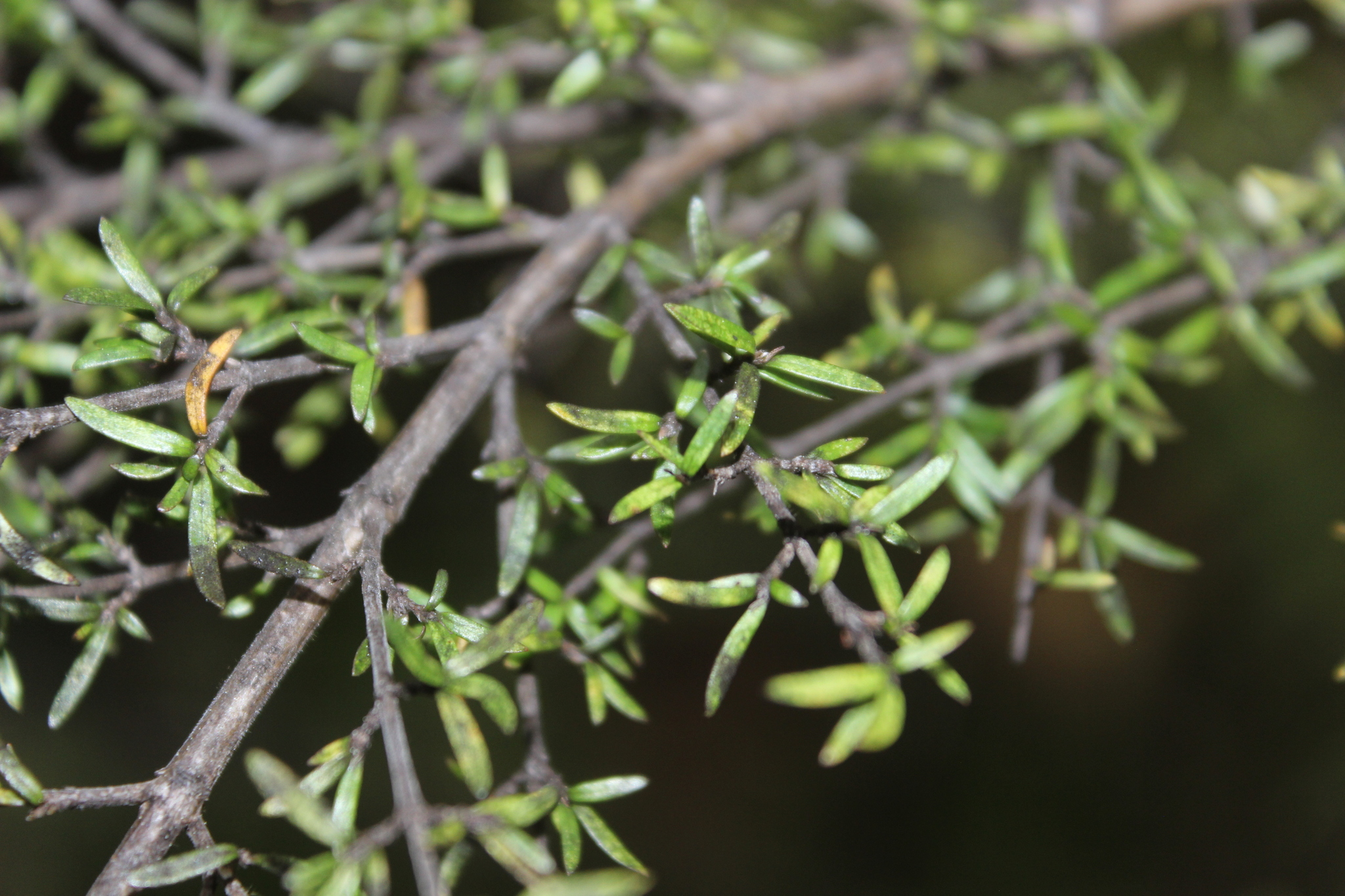
- Coprosma microcarpa in Upper Hutt, Wellington

Conservation status
- Not Threatened (NZ TCS)

Scientific classification
- Kingdom: Plantae
- Clade: Embryophytes
- Clade: Tracheophytes
- Clade: Angiosperms
- Clade: Eudicots
- Clade: Asterids
- Order: Gentianales
- Family: Rubiaceae
- Genus: Coprosma
- Species: C. microcarpa

Binomial name
- Coprosma microcarpa Hook.f.

= Coprosma microcarpa =

Species of flowering plant

Coprosma microcarpa is a species of plant, endemic to New Zealand.

== Description ==
The branches are generally horizontal, and the leaves are opposite, giving this Coprosma a distinctive appearance. There are minute hairs between the leaves on the steam, which can be seen with a hand lens.

The drupes are white and small, between 3–5 mm in diameter.

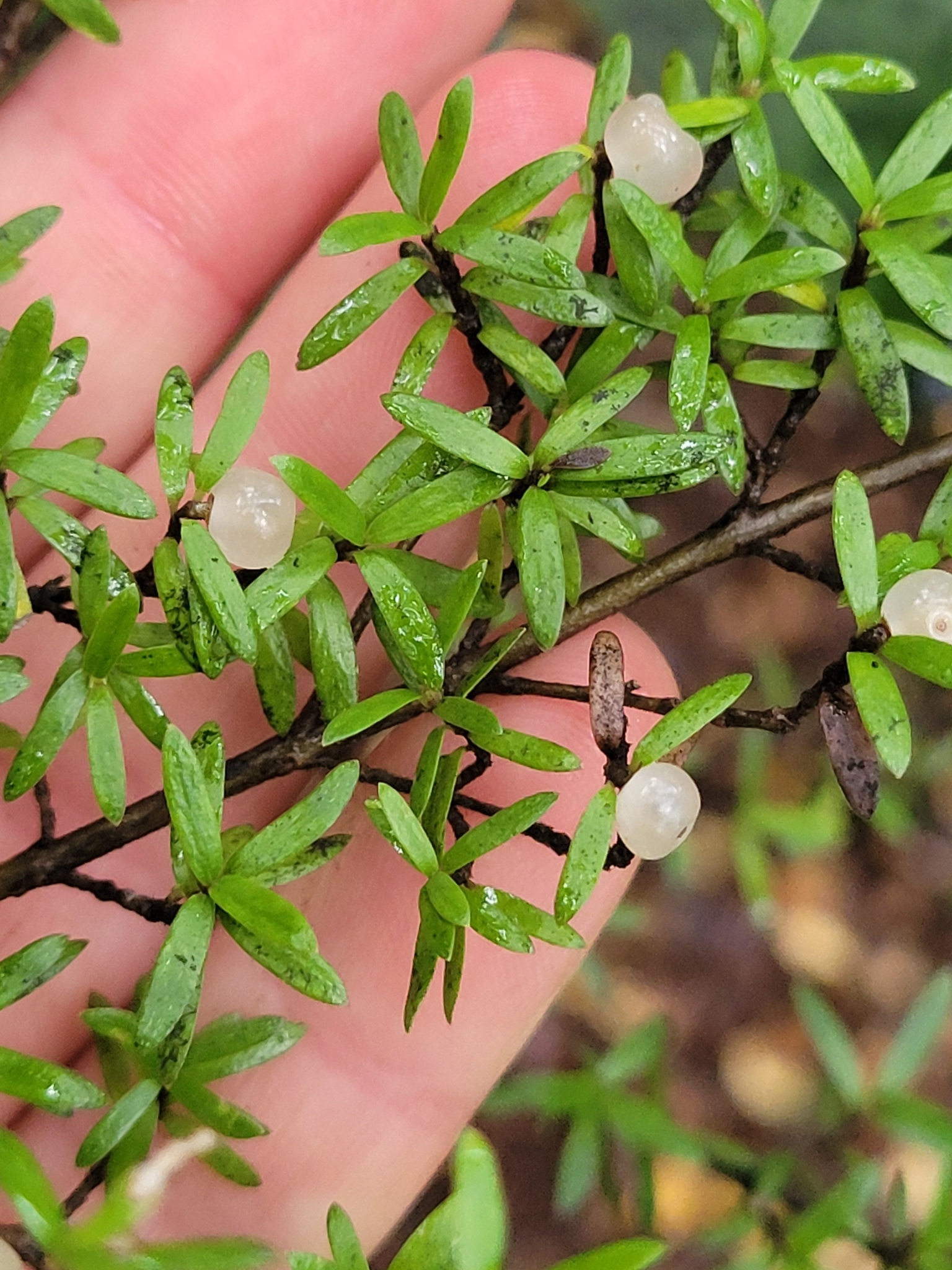
The white fruit of Coprosma microcarpa

== Distribution and habitat ==
This species is known from both the North and South Island of New Zealand.

It is currently not considered threatened.

== Etymology ==
Microcarpa means 'small fruit' in Latin.

== Taxonomy ==
This species was first described in 1852 by Joseph Dalton Hooker.
