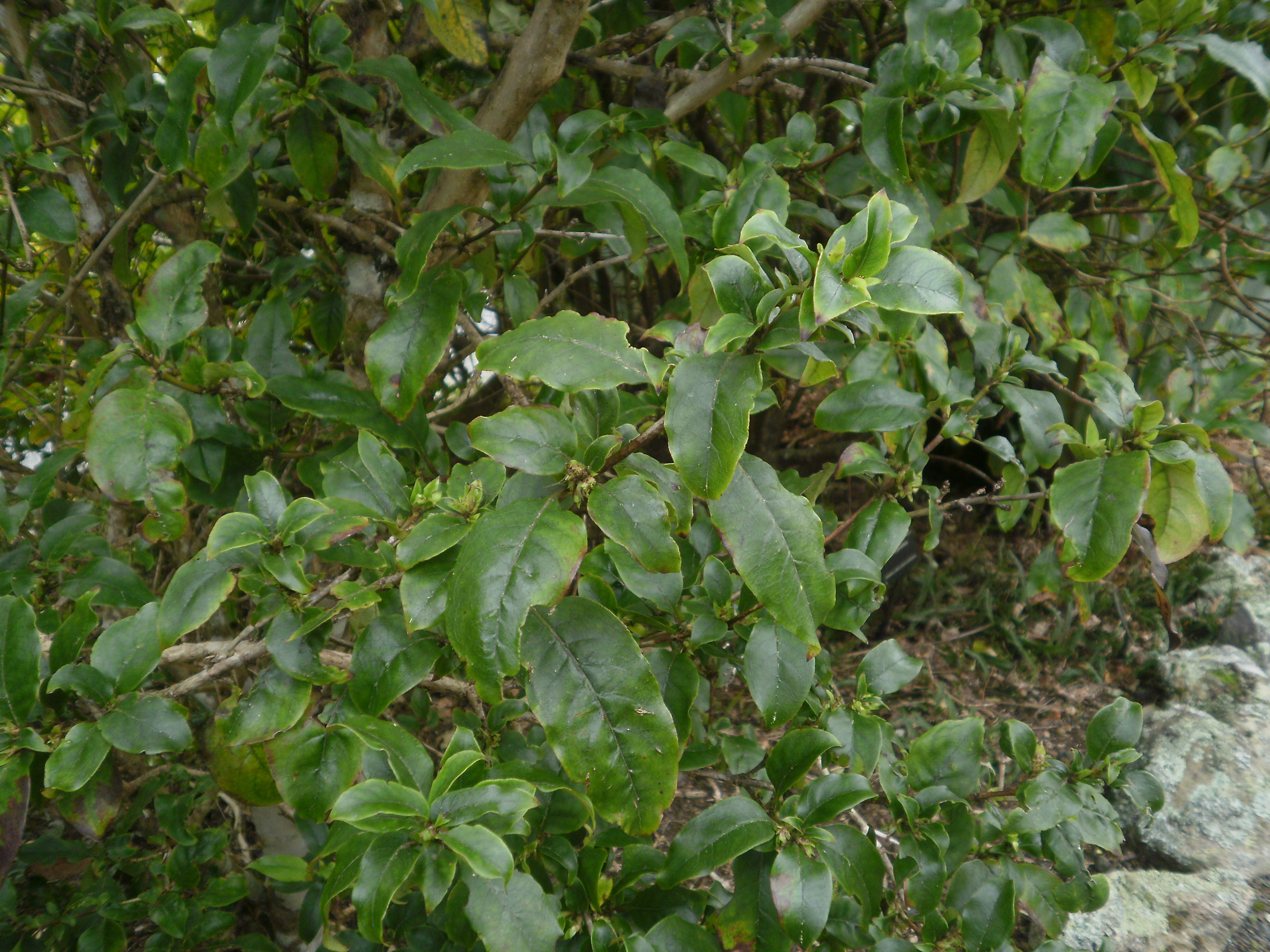

Scientific classification
- Kingdom: Plantae
- Clade: Tracheophytes
- Clade: Angiosperms
- Clade: Eudicots
- Clade: Asterids
- Order: Gentianales
- Family: Rubiaceae
- Genus: Coprosma
- Species: C. tenuifolia

Binomial name
- Coprosma tenuifolia Cheeseman, 1886

= Coprosma tenuifolia =

Species of plant

Coprosma tenuifolia, also called wavy-leaved coprosma, is a shrub or small tree that is native to New Zealand. C. tenuifolia grows to 5 metres high and has orange fruit.
