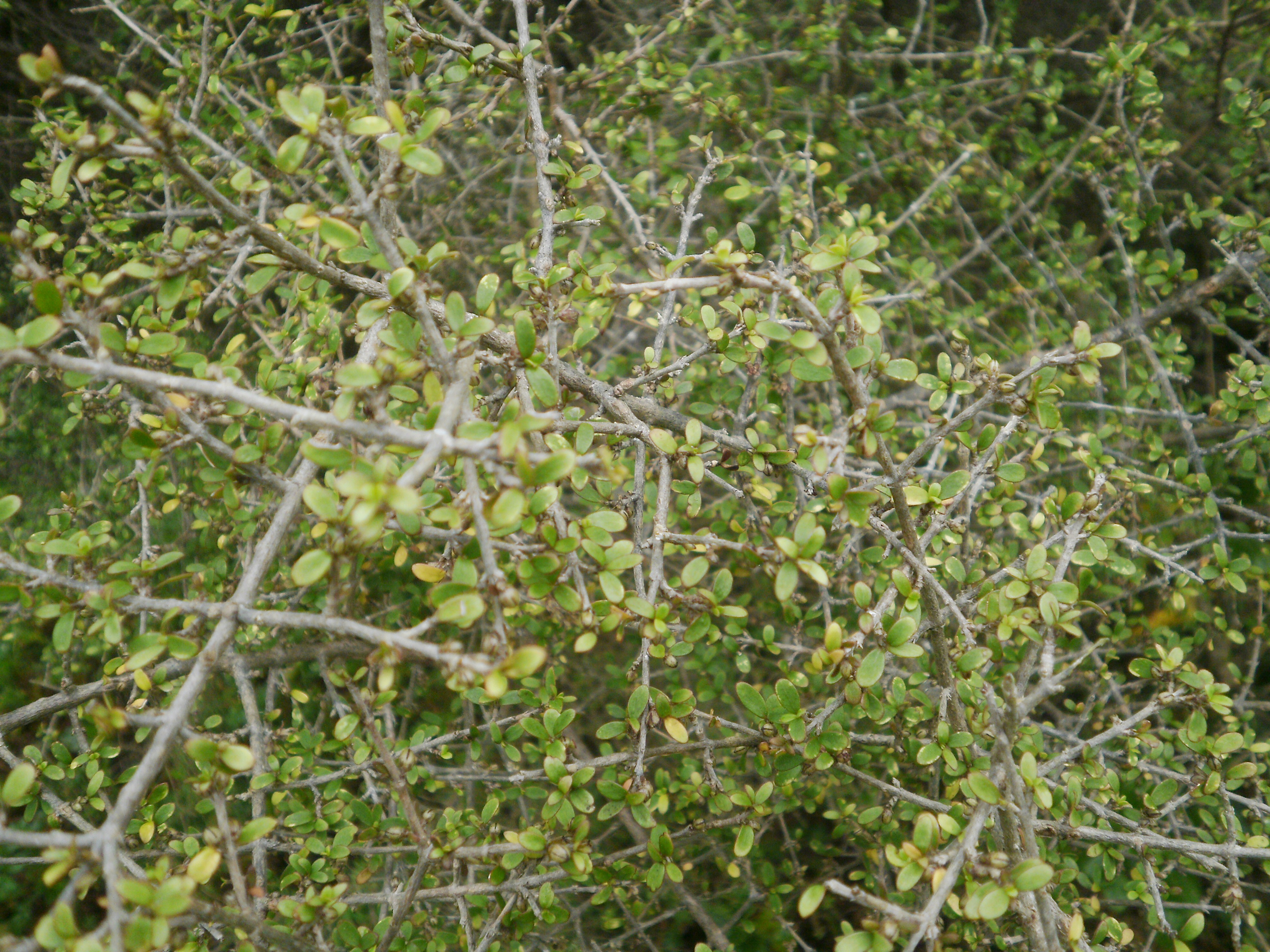

Conservation status
- Gradual Decline (NZ TCS)

Scientific classification
- Kingdom: Plantae
- Clade: Embryophytes
- Clade: Tracheophytes
- Clade: Spermatophytes
- Clade: Angiosperms
- Clade: Eudicots
- Clade: Asterids
- Order: Gentianales
- Family: Rubiaceae
- Genus: Coprosma
- Species: C. wallii

Binomial name
- Coprosma wallii Petrie

= Coprosma wallii =

Species of plant

Coprosma wallii is a rare species of shrub found in New Zealand.

Coprosma wallii grows to 3 metres high in a range of habitats, including alluvial forest, riparian forest, grey and sub-alpine scrub.
