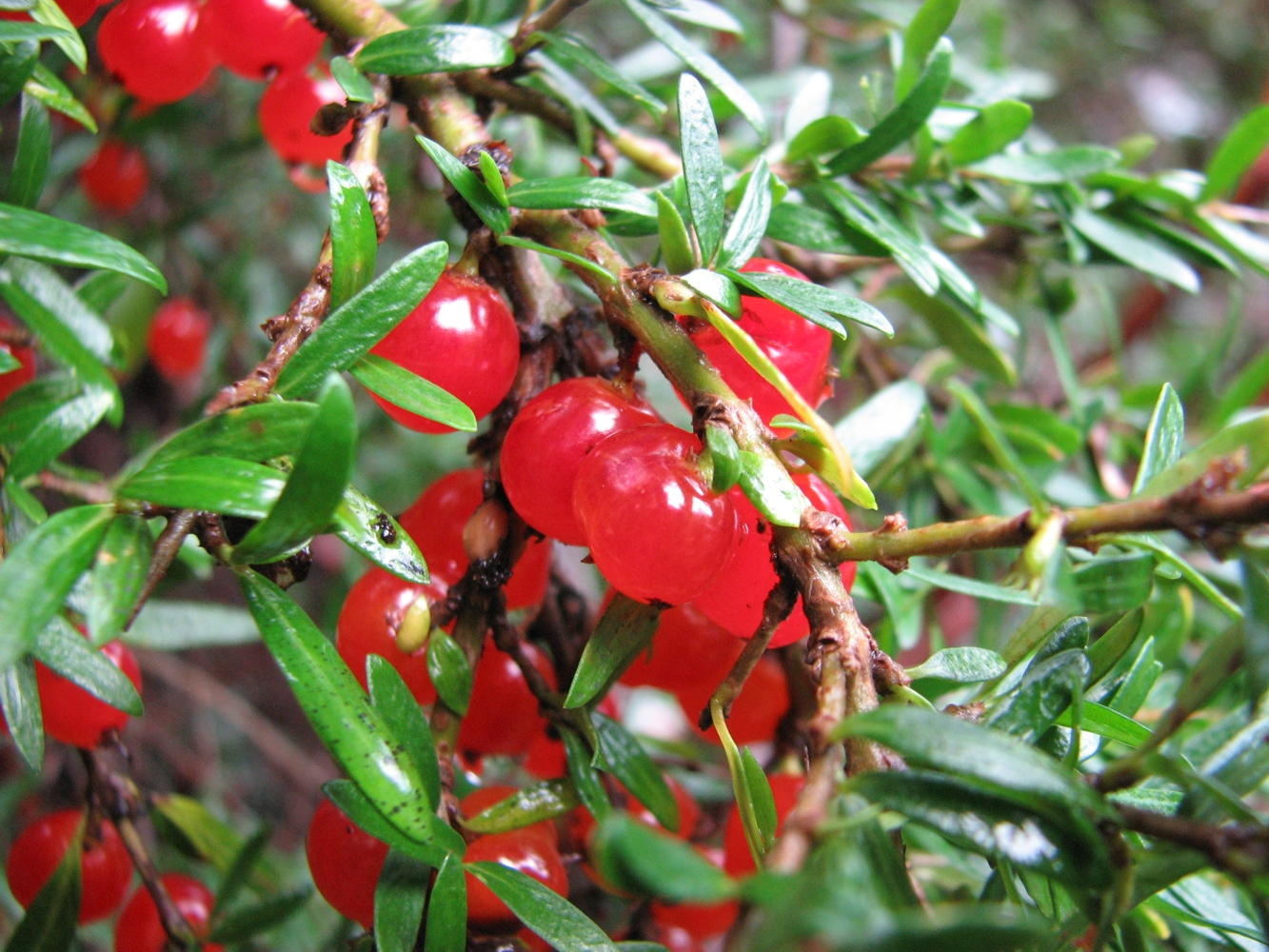

Scientific classification
- Kingdom: Plantae
- Clade: Tracheophytes
- Clade: Angiosperms
- Clade: Eudicots
- Clade: Asterids
- Order: Gentianales
- Family: Rubiaceae
- Genus: Coprosma
- Species: C. nitida

Binomial name
- Coprosma nitida Hook.f.

= Coprosma nitida =

Species of plant

Coprosma nitida, the mountain currant or shining currant, is a shrub species endemic to south-east Australia. It is a shrub with small, glossy leaves, occasional spines on the end of its branchlets, and small bright red-orange fruits.

== Description ==
Coprosma nitida is erect, densely branching shrub in the family Rubiaceae, growing between 1 and 2 m high. Leaves are 5–15 mm in length, narrow-ovate with a distinct midrib, glossy leaf surface, and entire leaf margin, arranged oppositely on short petioles. The ends of its branchlets are often sharpened. C. nitida is dioecious with single, terminal flowers. These are funnel-shaped, approximately 5 mm in diameter, and pale green in colour. Flowering occurs spring through summer followed by red-orange fleshy drupe or ‘fruit’, round and 10 mm long.

== Habitat and distribution ==
The genus Coprosma is found in Australia, New Zealand, the Hawaiian Islands, Borneo, Java, New Guinea, to the Juan Fernández Islands. The species nitida is found exclusively in the south-eastern states Tasmania, some parts of Victoria and New South Wales. C. nitida most commonly occurs in subalpine woodlands between 400 and 1,000 m above sea level, in well-drained soils.
