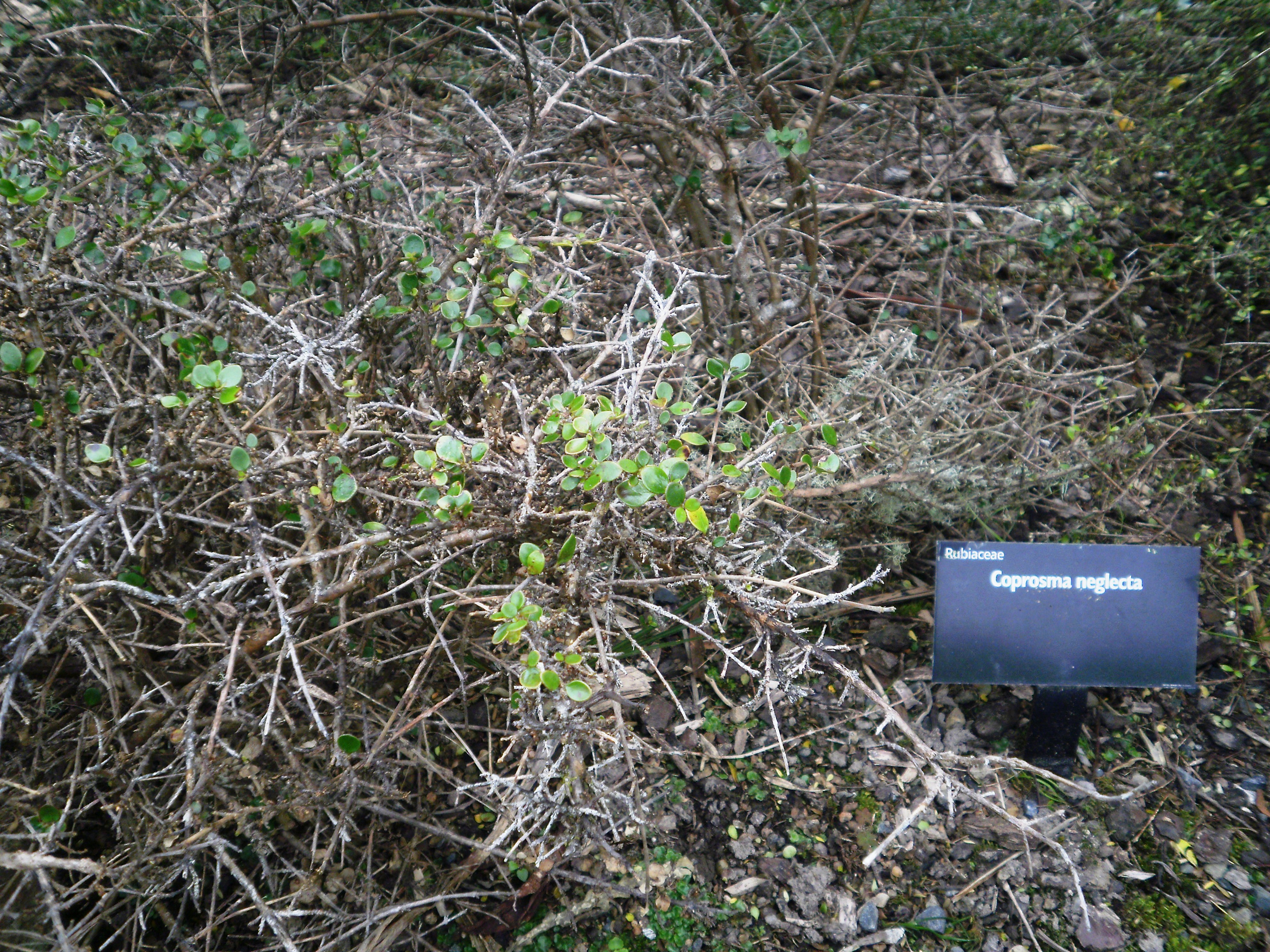

Scientific classification
- Kingdom: Plantae
- Clade: Tracheophytes
- Clade: Angiosperms
- Clade: Eudicots
- Clade: Asterids
- Order: Gentianales
- Family: Rubiaceae
- Genus: Coprosma
- Species: C. neglecta

Binomial name
- Coprosma neglecta Cheeseman

= Coprosma neglecta =

Species of plant

Coprosma neglecta is a species of coastal shrub that is native to New Zealand. C. neglecta is found around the North Cape of New Zealand.

Comprosma neglecta grows up to 50 centimetres tall and has small, circular, glossy green leaves. The plant produces orange-red fruit.
