= Coprosma cordicarpa =

Conservation status
- Endangered (IUCN 3.1)

Scientific classification
- Kingdom: Plantae
- Clade: Tracheophytes
- Clade: Angiosperms
- Clade: Eudicots
- Clade: Asterids
- Order: Gentianales
- Family: Rubiaceae
- Genus: Coprosma
- Species: C. cordicarpa

Binomial name
- Coprosma cordicarpa J. Cantley, Sporck-Koehler & Chau, 2016

Species of flowering plant

Coprosma cordicarpa, known as pilo, is a species of plant endemic to the Hawaiian island of Maui. It is locally common in high-elevation dry forests and shrublands of leeward East Maui. It can be distinguished from other Hawaiian Coprosma by its heart-shaped fruit. It is classified as Endangered on the IUCN Red List due to a heavy population decline caused by invasive species.
