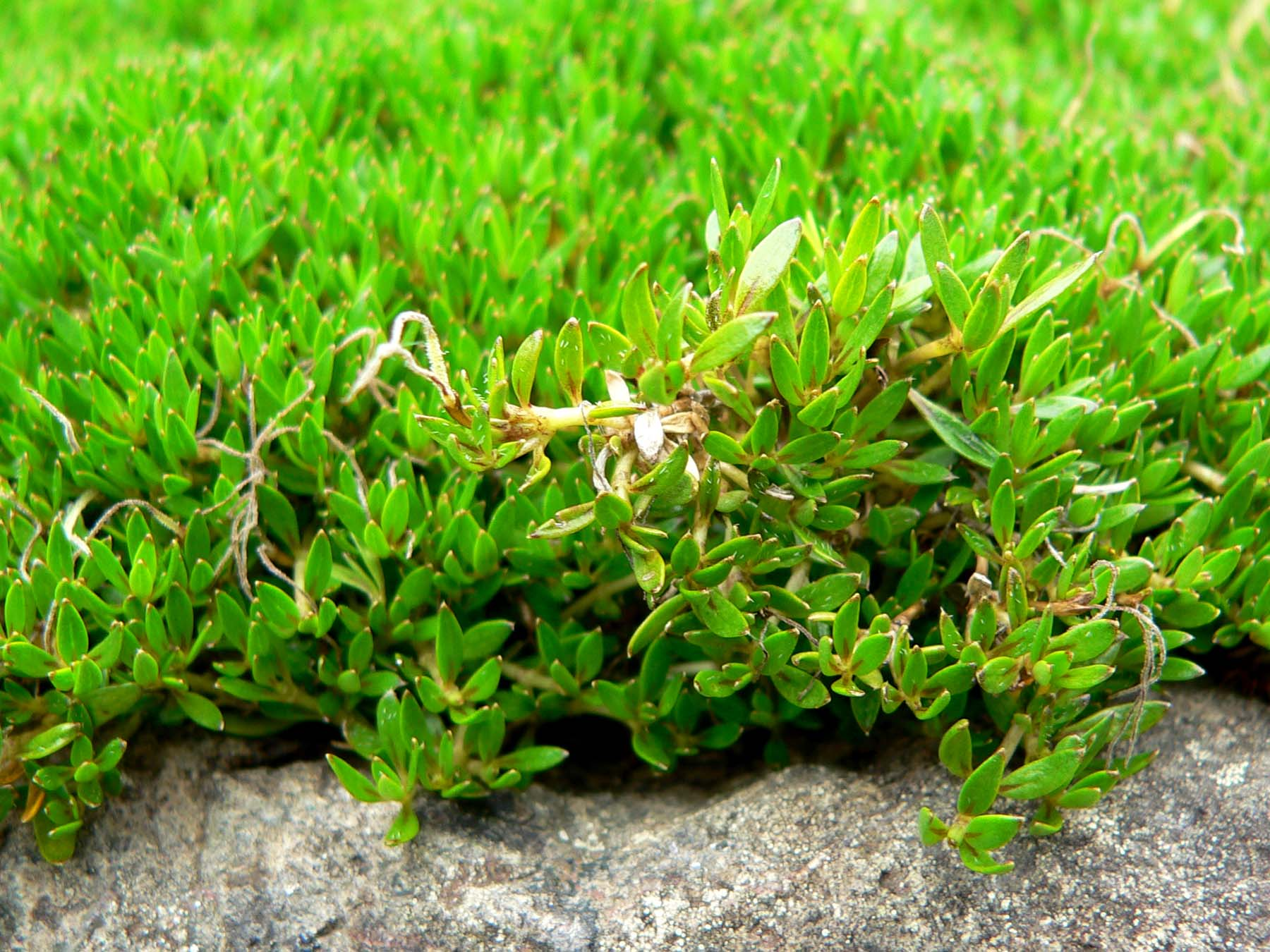
- Coprosma petriei leaves

Scientific classification
- Kingdom: Plantae
- Clade: Tracheophytes
- Clade: Angiosperms
- Clade: Eudicots
- Clade: Asterids
- Order: Gentianales
- Family: Rubiaceae
- Genus: Coprosma
- Species: C. petriei

Binomial name
- Coprosma petriei Cheeseman, 1886

= Coprosma petriei =

Species of plant

Coprosma petriei 484431944

Coprosma petriei, commonly mirrorplant, is a mat-forming shrub native to New Zealand. It is a hardy wind pollinated plant that is 0.1 m (4 in) by 0.5 m (20 in). Seeds mature in August and the plants only produce either male or female flowers; they are not self-fertilizing.

Coprosma petriei does not tolerate temperatures below 0 degrees Celsius. The natural habits are across both the North and South Island of New Zealand. It is endemic to New Zealand. It commonly lives in lowland to higher montane tussock grassland, on open, well-drained or rocky sites or on moraine or dry gravel river flats, along stream margins. In some habitats it forms extensive mats.

This plant was identified and named by Thomas Cheeseman.
