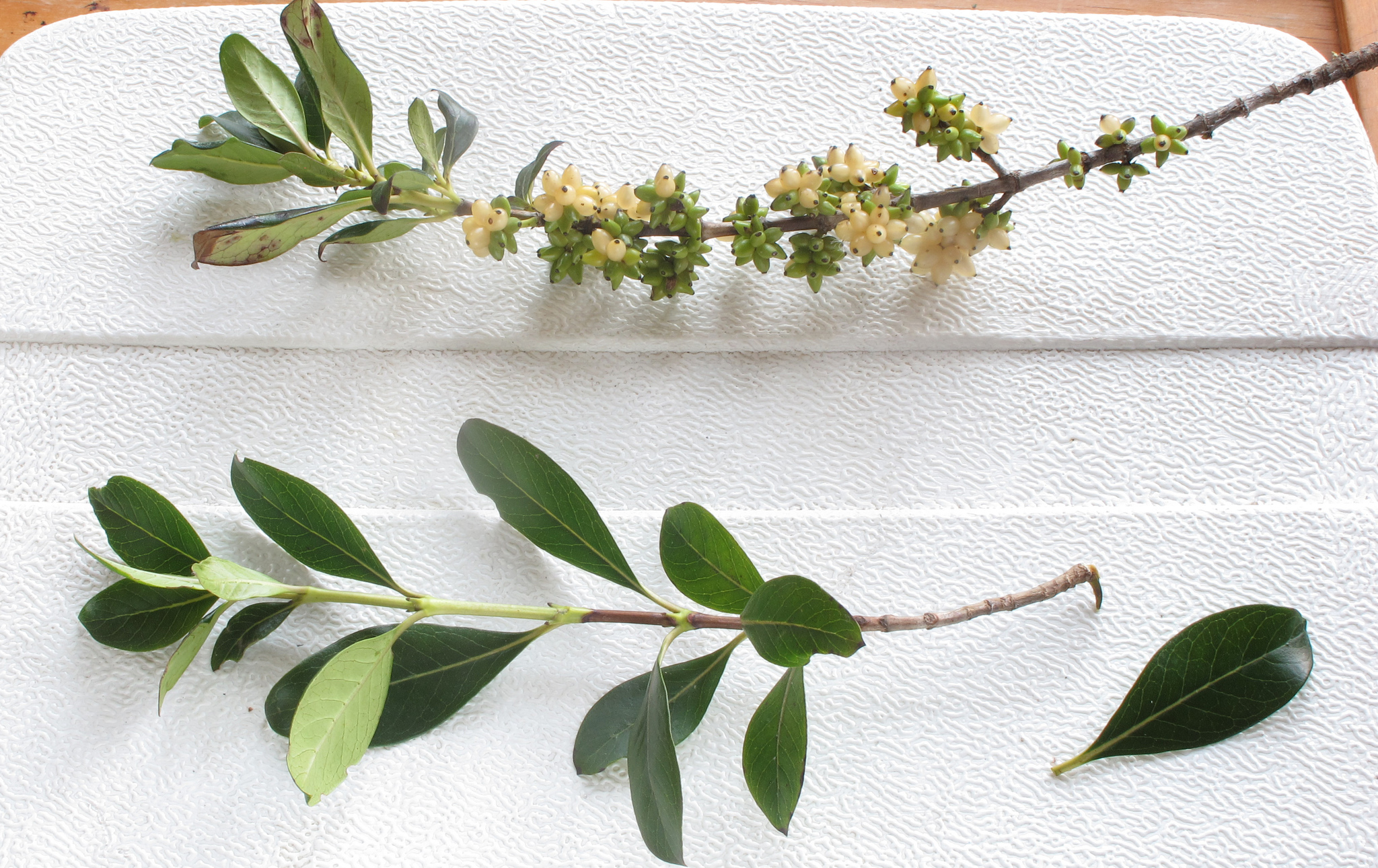
- Leaves and fruit of Coprosma × cunninghamii

Scientific classification
- Kingdom: Plantae
- Clade: Tracheophytes
- Clade: Angiosperms
- Clade: Eudicots
- Clade: Asterids
- Order: Gentianales
- Family: Rubiaceae
- Genus: Coprosma
- Species: C. × cunninghamii

Binomial name
- Coprosma × cunninghamii Hook.f.

Synonyms
- Coprosma cunninghamii

= Coprosma × cunninghamii =

Hybrid species of flowering plant

Coprosma × cunninghamii is a shrub or tree native to New Zealand.

== Description ==
Coprosma × cunninghamii is a plant that is typically found in the form of a shrub or tree. This species of Coprosma is a hybrid between Coprosma robusta and Coprosma propinqua.

== Range ==
Coprosma × cunninghamii is found throughout both mainland islands of New Zealand as well as Stewart Island.
