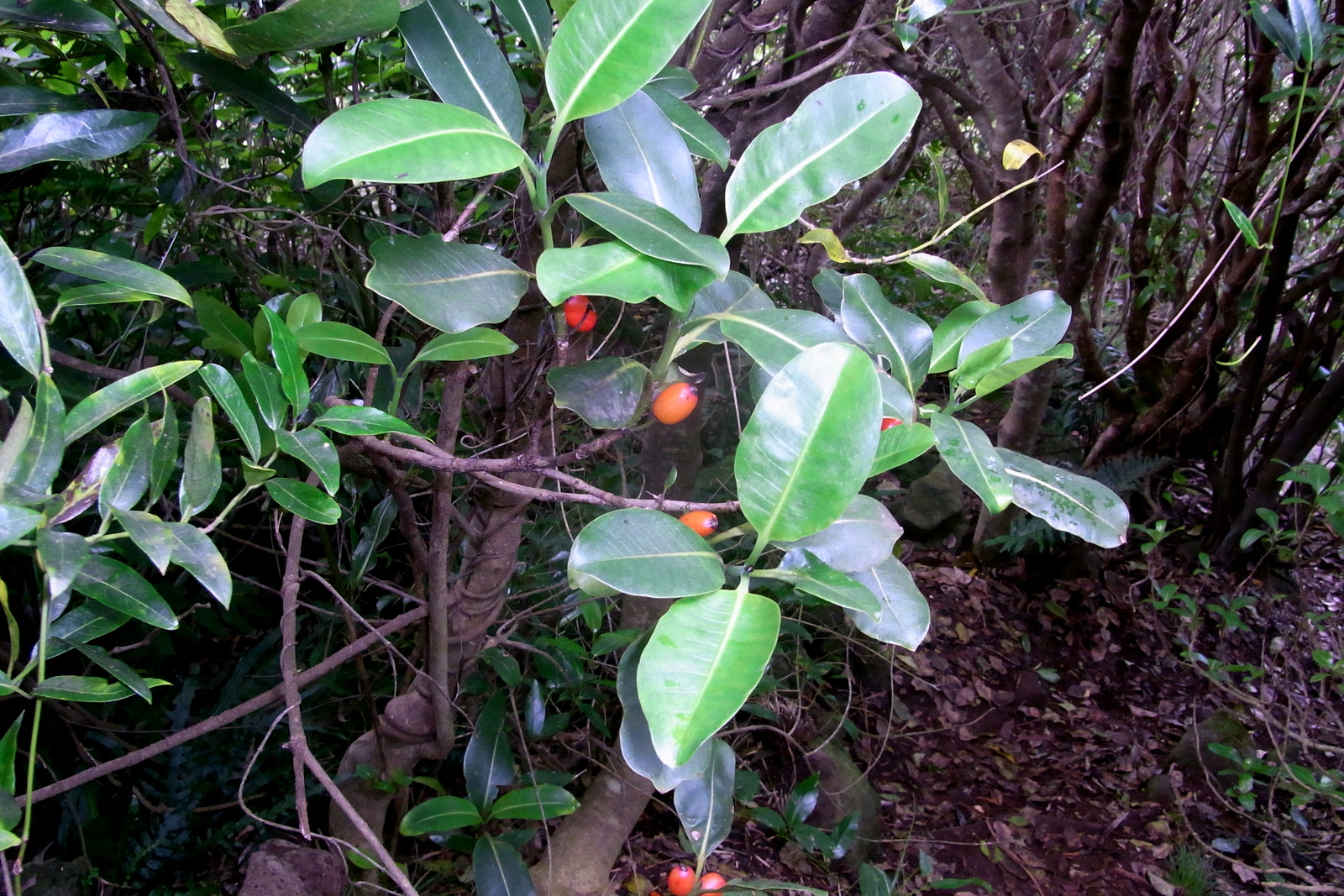

Scientific classification
- Kingdom: Plantae
- Clade: Tracheophytes
- Clade: Angiosperms
- Clade: Eudicots
- Clade: Asterids
- Order: Gentianales
- Family: Rubiaceae
- Genus: Coprosma
- Species: C. putida

Binomial name
- Coprosma putida C.Moore & F.Muell. (1869)

= Coprosma putida =

Species of plant

Coprosma putida, commonly known as stinkwood, is a flowering plant in the family Rubiaceae. The Latin specific epithet putida means "stinking", alluding to the stench produced when the plant is cut or bruised, including the leaves and fruit.

== Description ==
It is a shrub or small tree growing to 4 m in height. The broadly elliptic-oblong leaves are 40–110 mm long, 25–80 mm wide. The small, greenish-white flowers are 8 mm long. The fleshy, red fruits are 20 mm long. The flowering season is from August to early November.

== Distribution and habitat ==
The species is endemic to Australia’s subtropical Lord Howe Island in the Tasman Sea. It is common and widespread at all elevations in sheltered forest.
