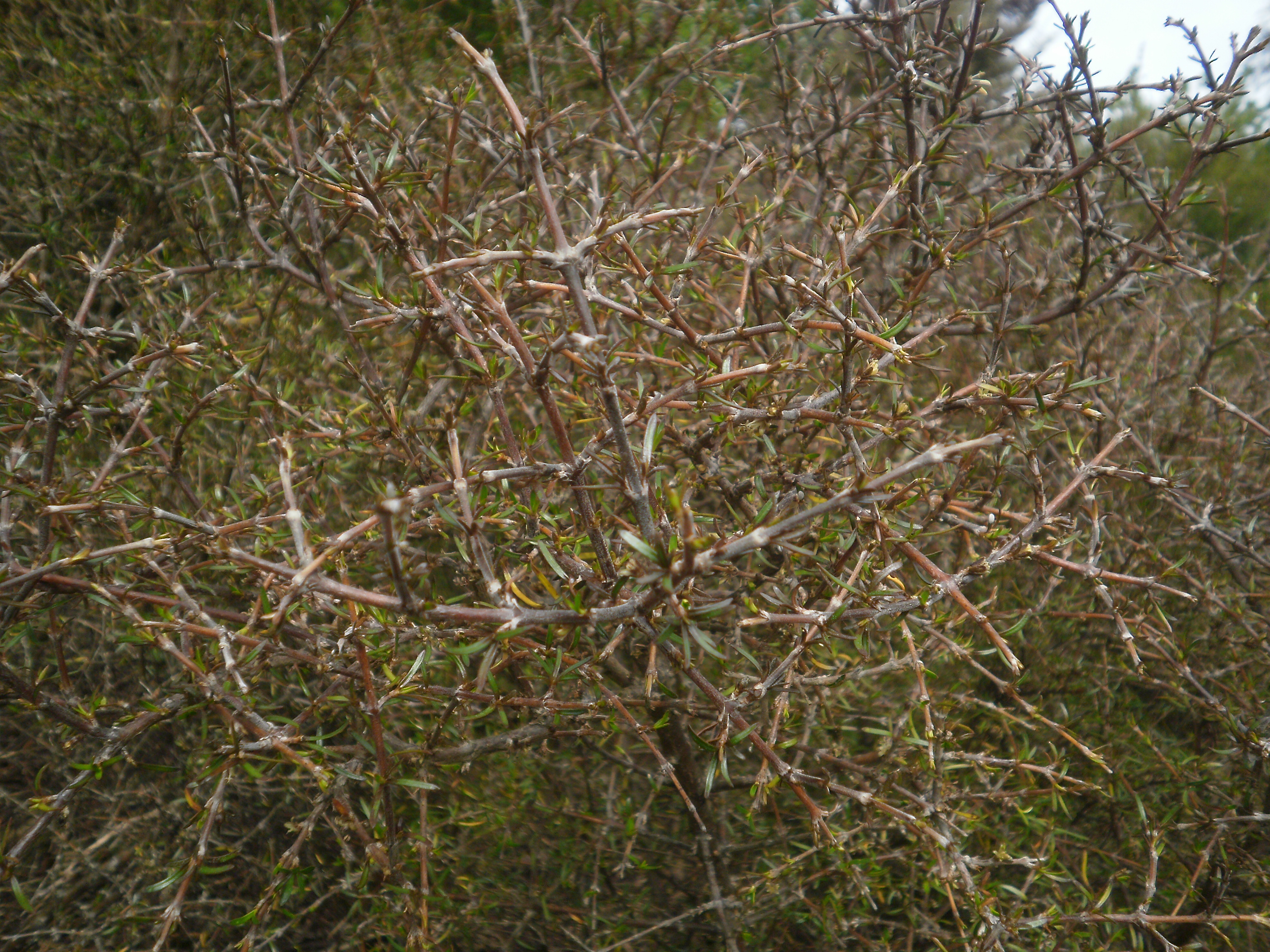

Conservation status
- Sparse (NZ TCS)

Scientific classification
- Kingdom: Plantae
- Clade: Tracheophytes
- Clade: Angiosperms
- Clade: Eudicots
- Clade: Asterids
- Order: Gentianales
- Family: Rubiaceae
- Genus: Coprosma
- Species: C. intertexta

Binomial name
- Coprosma intertexta G.Simpson

= Coprosma intertexta =

Species of plant

Coprosma intertexta, is a shrub that is native to New Zealand. It occurs in the eastern South Island usually amongst dry scrub or rocky areas.
