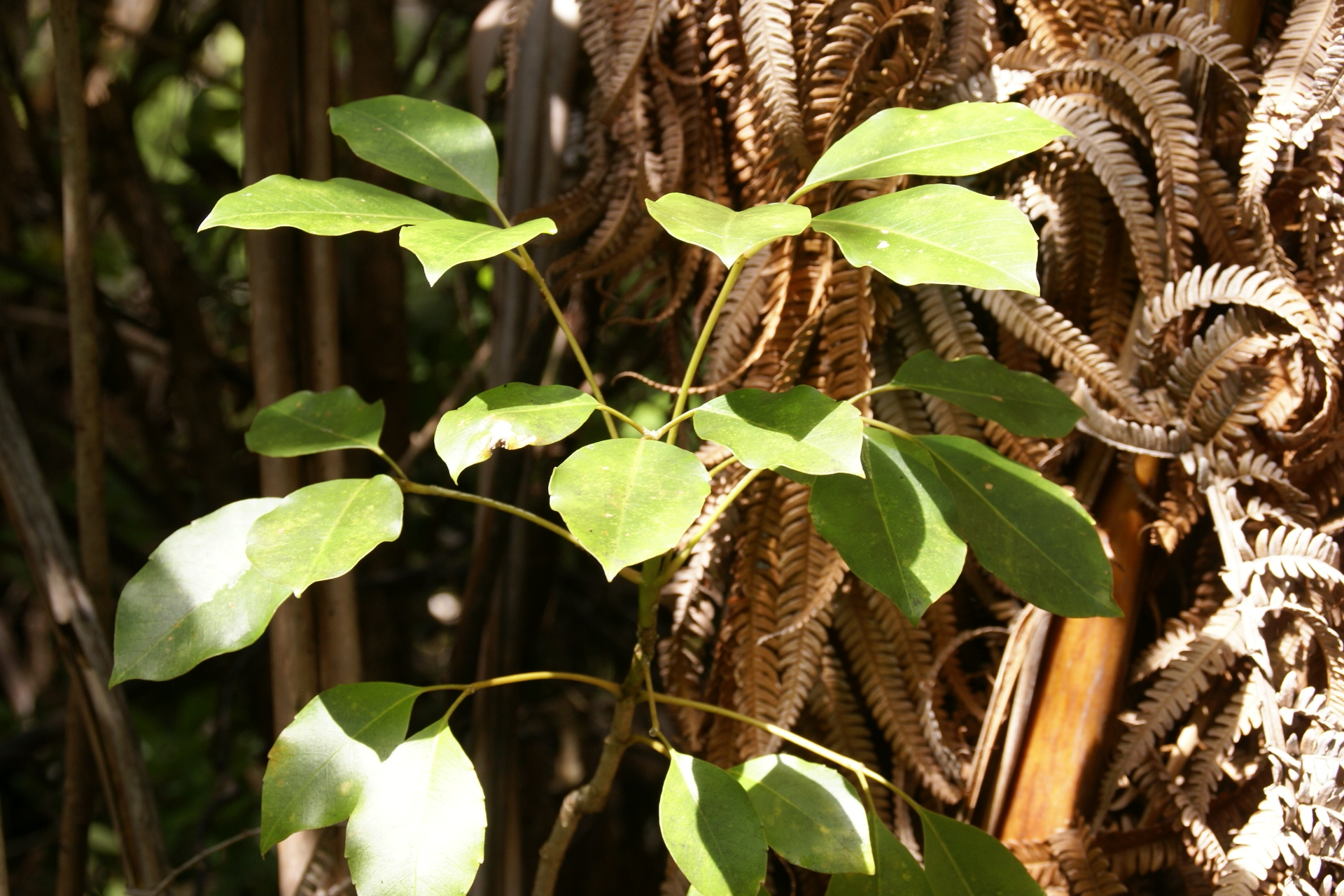

Conservation status
- Vulnerable (IUCN 3.1)

- Vulnerable (NatureServe)

Scientific classification
- Kingdom: Plantae
- Clade: Tracheophytes
- Clade: Angiosperms
- Clade: Eudicots
- Clade: Asterids
- Order: Gentianales
- Family: Rubiaceae
- Genus: Coprosma
- Species: C. ochracea

Binomial name
- Coprosma ochracea W.R.B. Oliv.

= Coprosma ochracea =

Species of plant

Coprosma ochracea, the Maui mirrorplant, is a shrub that is native to Hawaii.

A member of the coffee family, it bears bright red or orange berries.

The Hawaiian thrush eats its fruits and spread the seeds. Some people use the berries as laxative.
