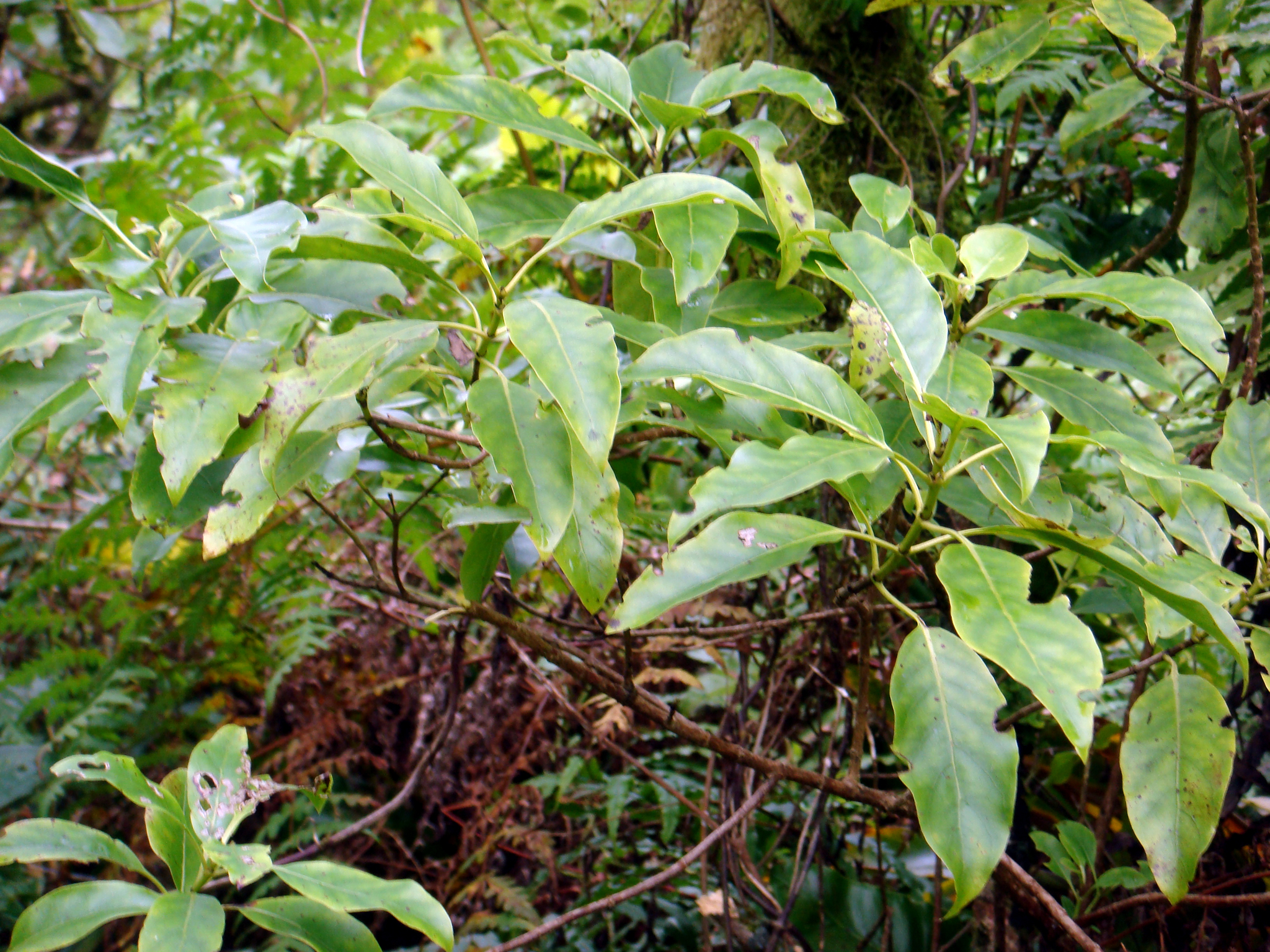

Conservation status
- Critically Endangered (IUCN 3.1)

Scientific classification
- Kingdom: Plantae
- Clade: Embryophytes
- Clade: Tracheophytes
- Clade: Angiosperms
- Clade: Eudicots
- Clade: Asterids
- Order: Gentianales
- Family: Rubiaceae
- Genus: Coprosma
- Species: C. laevigata

Binomial name
- Coprosma laevigata Cheeseman, 1903

= Coprosma laevigata =

Species of the flowering plant

Coprosma laevigata, the Rarotongan coprosma, is a herbaceous plant, a member of the Rubiaceae family.

== Distribution ==
It is an endemic species to the Cook Islands.

== Taxonomy ==
It was named by Thomas Cheeseman, in Trans. Linn. Soc. London, Bot. 6: 283, in 1903.
