= Coprosma inopinata =

Scientific classification
- Kingdom: Plantae
- Clade: Tracheophytes
- Clade: Angiosperms
- Clade: Eudicots
- Clade: Asterids
- Order: Gentianales
- Family: Rubiaceae
- Genus: Coprosma
- Species: C. inopinata

Binomial name
- Coprosma inopinata I.Hutton & P.S.Green

Species of plant

Coprosma inopinata is a flowering plant in the family Rubiaceae. The specific epithet comes from the Latin inopinus (“unexpected”), because it was discovered unexpectedly in 1989, proving to be yet another species of Coprosma that was endemic to Lord Howe Island.

== Description ==
It is a compact shrub, scrambling or prostrate, with shoots extending to 50 cm in height. The broadly lanceolate to elliptic leaves are 7–13 mm long, 3–6 mm wide. The small flowers, crowded between leaf and stem, are green with purple edges and 6–9 mm long. The fleshy, egg-shaped, orange fruits are 6 mm long. The flowering season is from October to November.

== Distribution and habitat ==
The species is endemic to Australia's subtropical Lord Howe Island in the Tasman Sea. It is rare and has only been recorded at or around the summits of Mounts Lidgbird and Gower at the southern end of the island.
