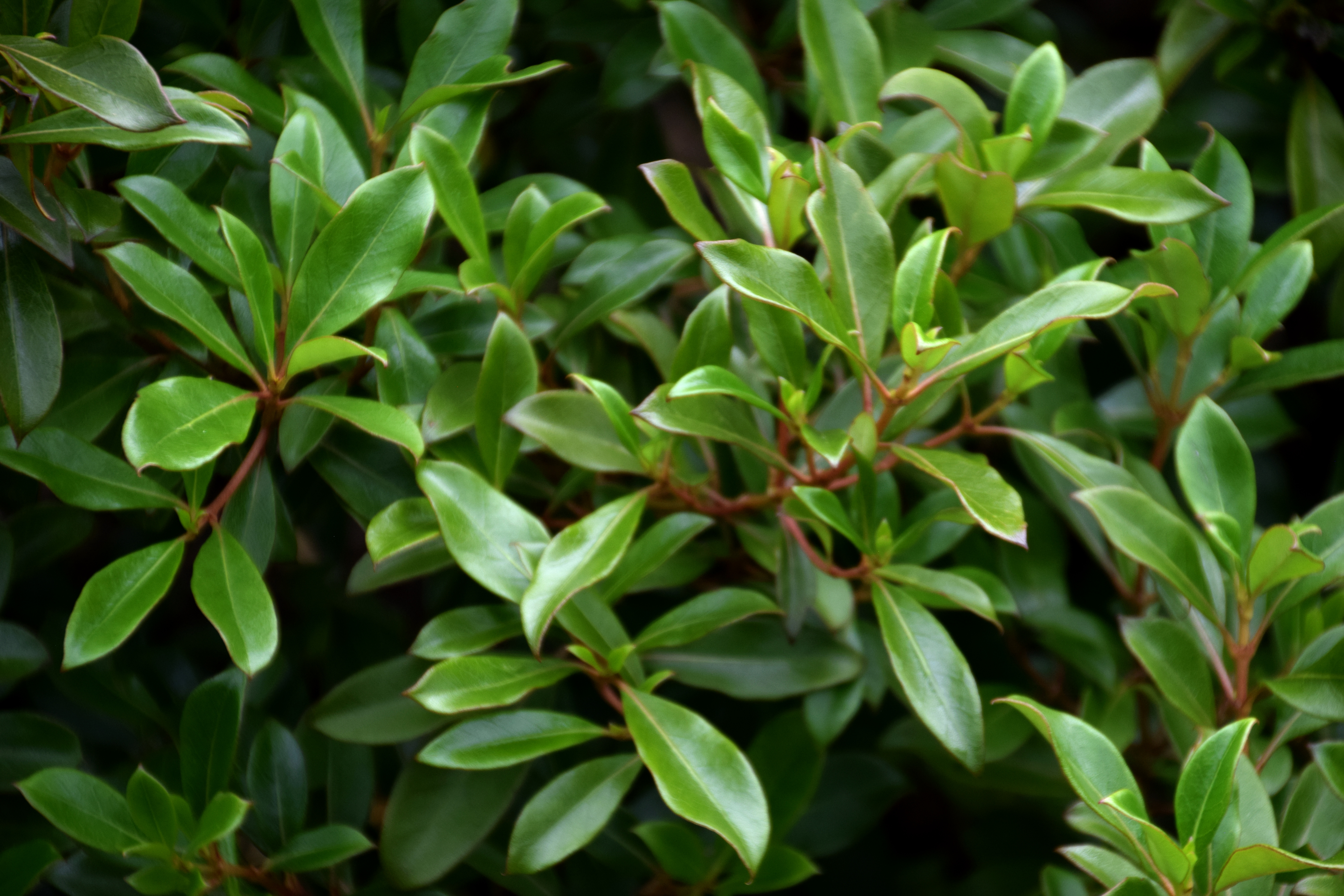

Scientific classification
- Kingdom: Plantae
- Clade: Tracheophytes
- Clade: Angiosperms
- Clade: Eudicots
- Clade: Asterids
- Order: Gentianales
- Family: Rubiaceae
- Genus: Coprosma
- Species: C. dodonaeifolia

Binomial name
- Coprosma dodonaeifolia W.R.B.Oliv.

= Coprosma dodonaeifolia =

Species of plant

Coprosma dodonaeifolia is a species of plant in the family Rubiaceae native to north New Zealand.

The species has a chromosome number of 44. It is also closely related to Coprosma lucida.
