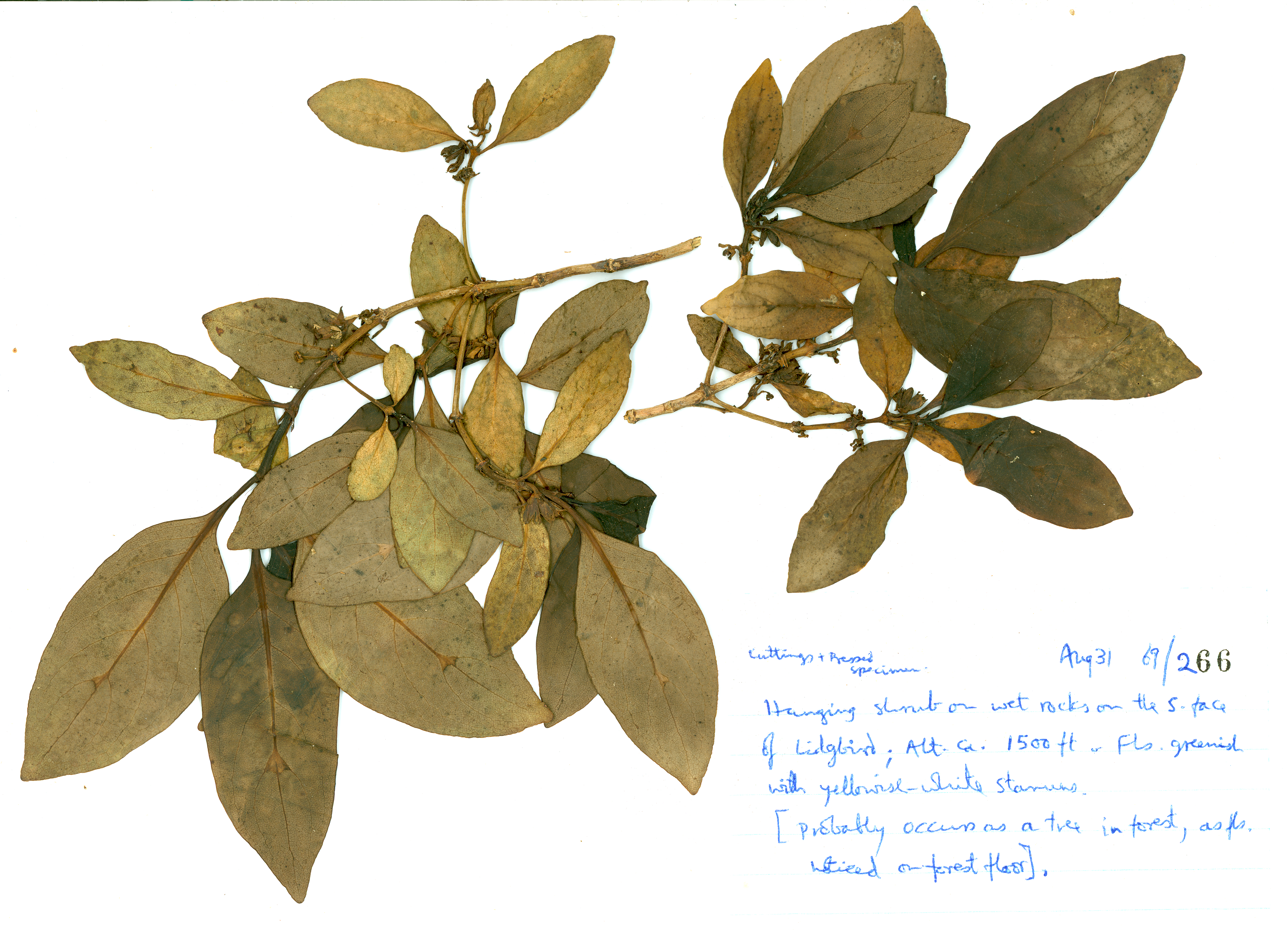
- Herbarium specimen

Scientific classification
- Kingdom: Plantae
- Clade: Tracheophytes
- Clade: Angiosperms
- Clade: Eudicots
- Clade: Asterids
- Order: Gentianales
- Family: Rubiaceae
- Genus: Coprosma
- Species: C. lanceolaris

Binomial name
- Coprosma lanceolaris F.Muell. (1875)

= Coprosma lanceolaris =

Species of plant

Coprosma lanceolaris is a flowering plant in the family Rubiaceae. The specific epithet comes from the Latin lancea (“lance” or “spear”) with the suffix -aris (“pertaining to”), alluding to the shape of the leaves.

== Description ==
It is a shrub growing to 2 m in height. The fleshy, bright green, broadly lanceolate or lanceolate to elliptic leaves are 30–90 mm long, 15–40 mm wide, with a foetid odour when crushed. The flowers are small and green, 5 mm long. The egg-shaped red fruits are 6–8 mm long. The flowering season is from mid May to mid October.

== Distribution and habitat ==
The species is endemic to Australia’s subtropical Lord Howe Island in the Tasman Sea. It is common in the montane forest of the island, at elevations of over 500 m.
