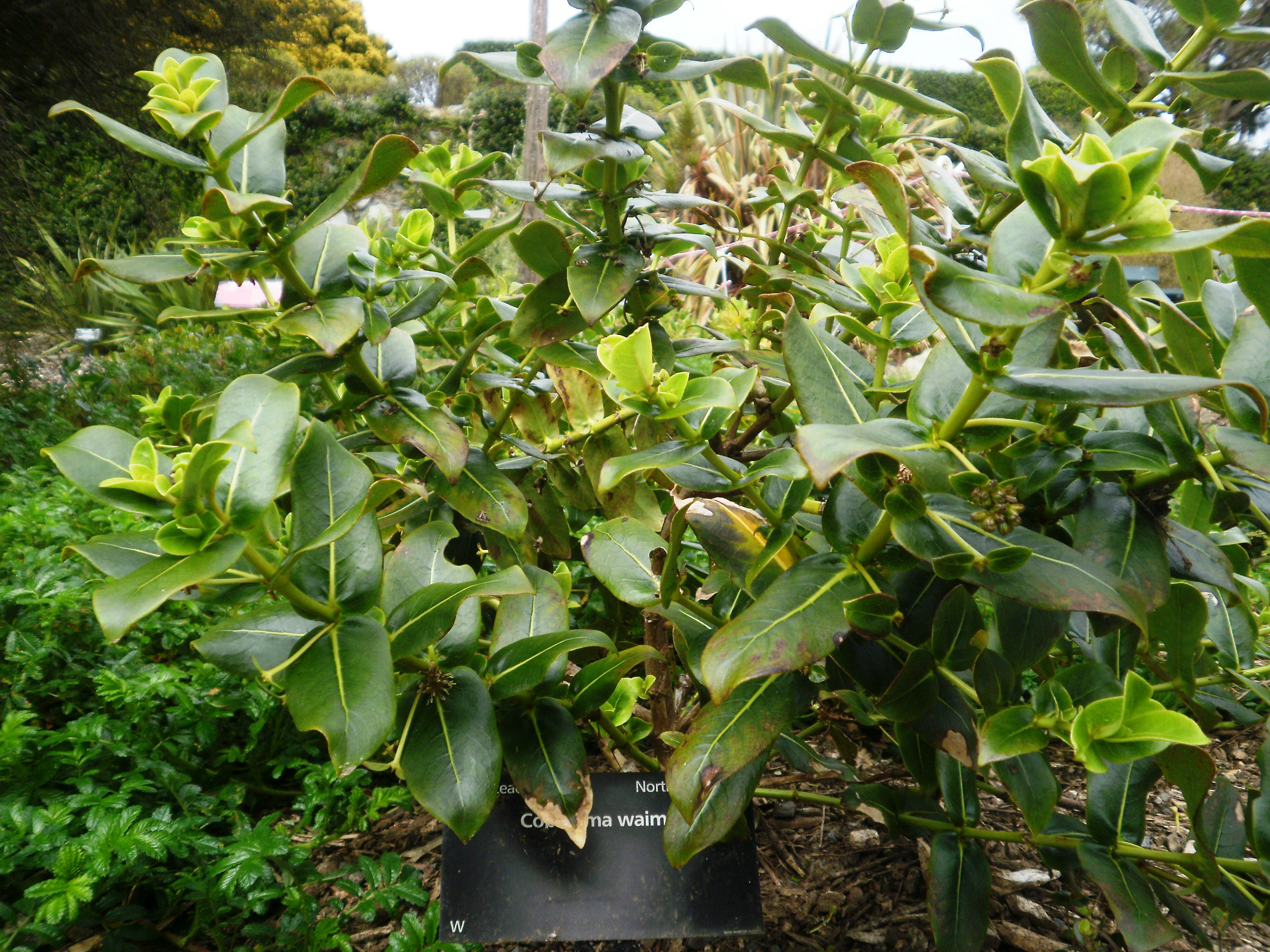

Conservation status
- Nationally Endangered (NZ TCS)

Scientific classification
- Kingdom: Plantae
- Clade: Tracheophytes
- Clade: Angiosperms
- Clade: Eudicots
- Clade: Asterids
- Order: Gentianales
- Family: Rubiaceae
- Genus: Coprosma
- Species: C. waima

Binomial name
- Coprosma waima A.P.Druce

= Coprosma waima =

Species of plant

Coprosma waima, is a nationally endangered shrub of New Zealand. In the wild it only occurs in the Waima forest in the Northland Region.

Coprosma waima grows to 1–3 metres high at altitudes of around 700 metres above sea level.

Because it is liked by browsing animals such as goats and possums, it is mostly found on cliffs.

The species was described by New Zealand botanist Tony Druce in 1988.
