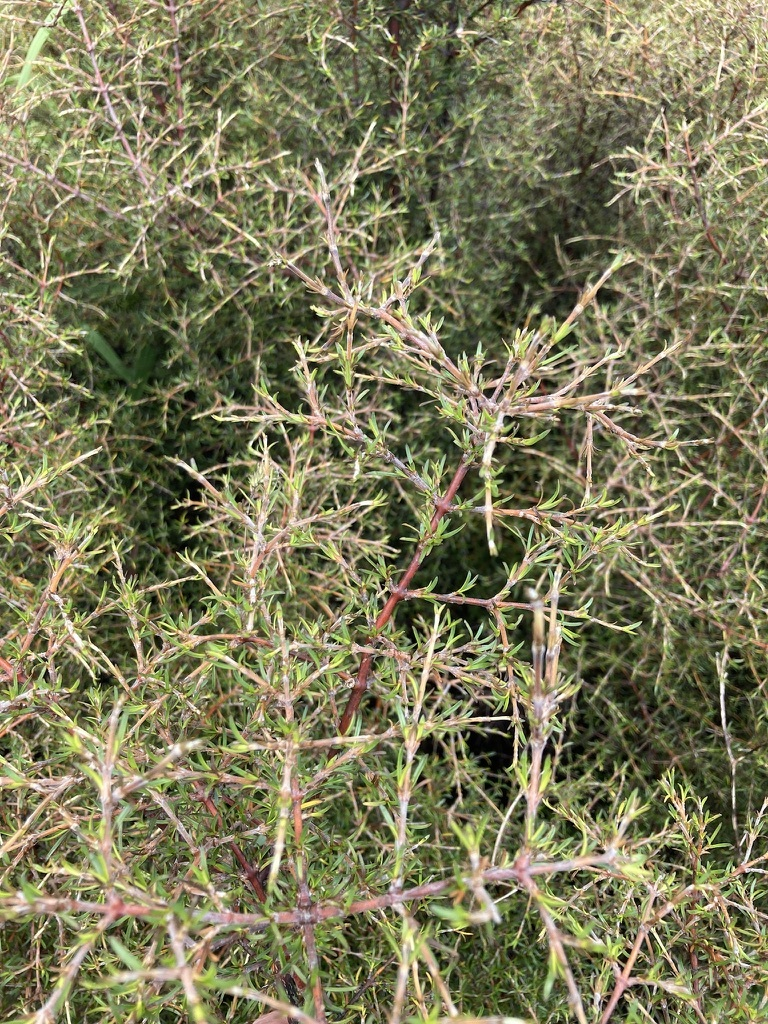

Scientific classification
- Kingdom: Plantae
- Clade: Tracheophytes
- Clade: Angiosperms
- Clade: Eudicots
- Clade: Asterids
- Order: Gentianales
- Family: Rubiaceae
- Genus: Coprosma
- Species: C. rugosa

Binomial name
- Coprosma rugosa Cheeseman, 1906

= Coprosma rugosa =

Species of flowering plant

Coprosma rugosa, also known as the needle-leaved mountain coprosma, is a shrub in the coffee family, Rubiaceae, that is native to New Zealand.

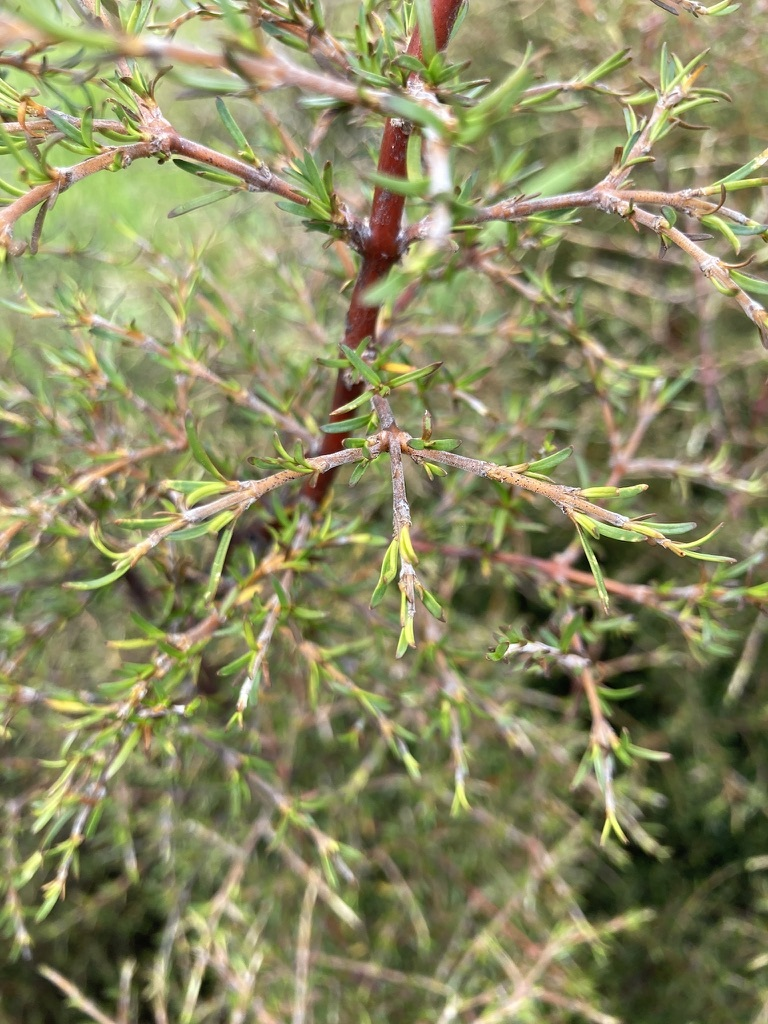
The reduced leaves of Coprosma rugosa give it its common name.

It is found in grasslands and forest margins up to the subalpine zone. C. rugosa bears small purple-white berries in autumn, the seed of which is widely dispersed by birds.

It is considered a very hardy shrub and is suitable for hedging.
