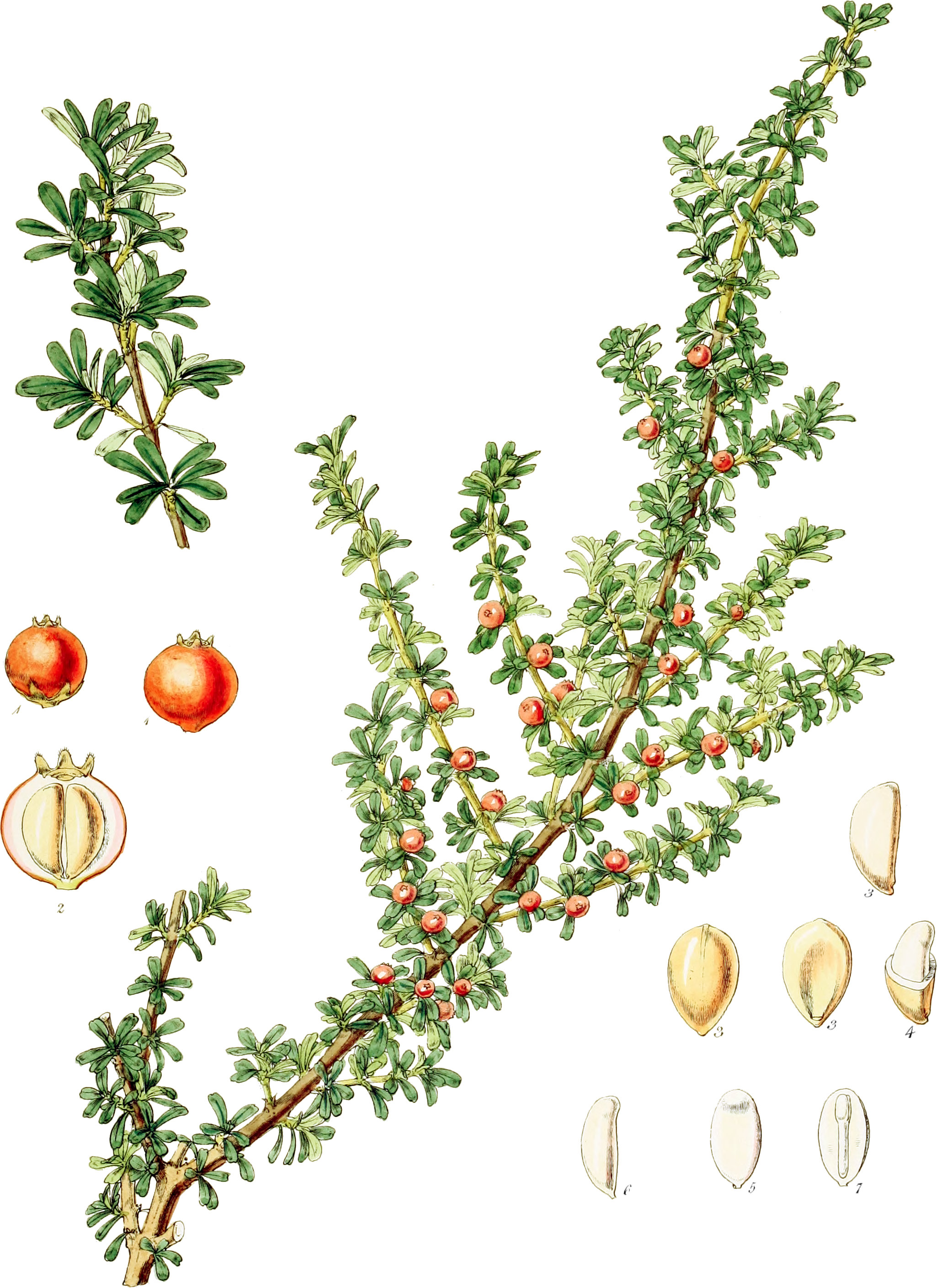
- Plate XV Coprosma cuneata

Scientific classification
- Kingdom: Plantae
- Clade: Embryophytes
- Clade: Tracheophytes
- Clade: Angiosperms
- Clade: Eudicots
- Clade: Asterids
- Order: Gentianales
- Family: Rubiaceae
- Genus: Coprosma
- Species: C. cuneata

Binomial name
- Coprosma cuneata Hook.f.

= Coprosma cuneata =

Species of plant

Coprosma cuneata, is a shrub in the Rubiaceae family, endemic to New Zealand.

== Description ==
Coprosma cuneata is a slender shrub up to 1 m tall that may hug the ground on exposed sites. The flexible branchlets are dark to very dark brown with clusters of small dark green narrow leaves. The stipules are oblong to triangular with a tuft of hair at their apex. The leaves are in distant opposite pairs with slender 1-2 mm stalks. The leaves are curved and 10-16 mm by 2 mm. They are widest at the tip. The fruit is red, 3-5 mm in diameter and persists on the shrub.

== Taxonomy and etymology ==
Coprosma is from the Greek kopros and osme meaning dung smell. Cuneata is from the Latin, meaning wedge-shaped.

== Distribution and habitat ==
Coprosma cuneata is found in the South Island and the southern offshore islands of New Zealand. It is found from lowland to 1,000 metres (3,300 ft) in forest, scrub and shrubland.

== Conservation status ==
Coprosma cuneata was classed as not threatened in 2024 according to the New Zealand Threat Classification System.
