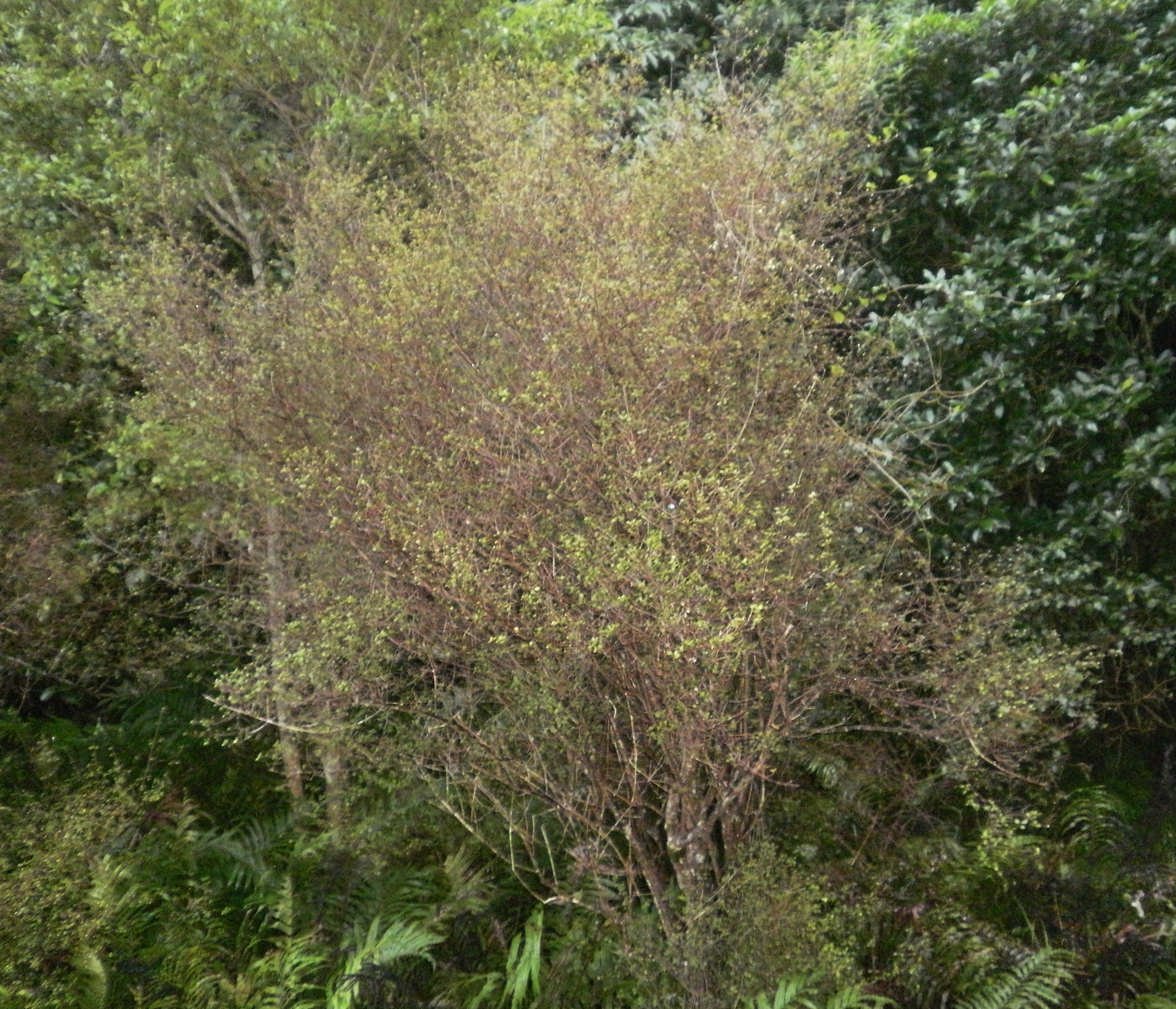

Scientific classification
- Kingdom: Plantae
- Clade: Tracheophytes
- Clade: Angiosperms
- Clade: Eudicots
- Clade: Asterids
- Order: Gentianales
- Family: Rubiaceae
- Genus: Coprosma
- Species: C. tenuicaulis

Binomial name
- Coprosma tenuicaulis Hook.f.

= Coprosma tenuicaulis =

Species of plant

Coprosma tenuicaulis, commonly called swamp coprosma is a native shrub of New Zealand. As its name suggests C. tenuicaulis is found in wet, boggy soil in and around swamp or lake areas.

The shrub flowers in early spring and produces black/red fruit that ripen between February and June.
