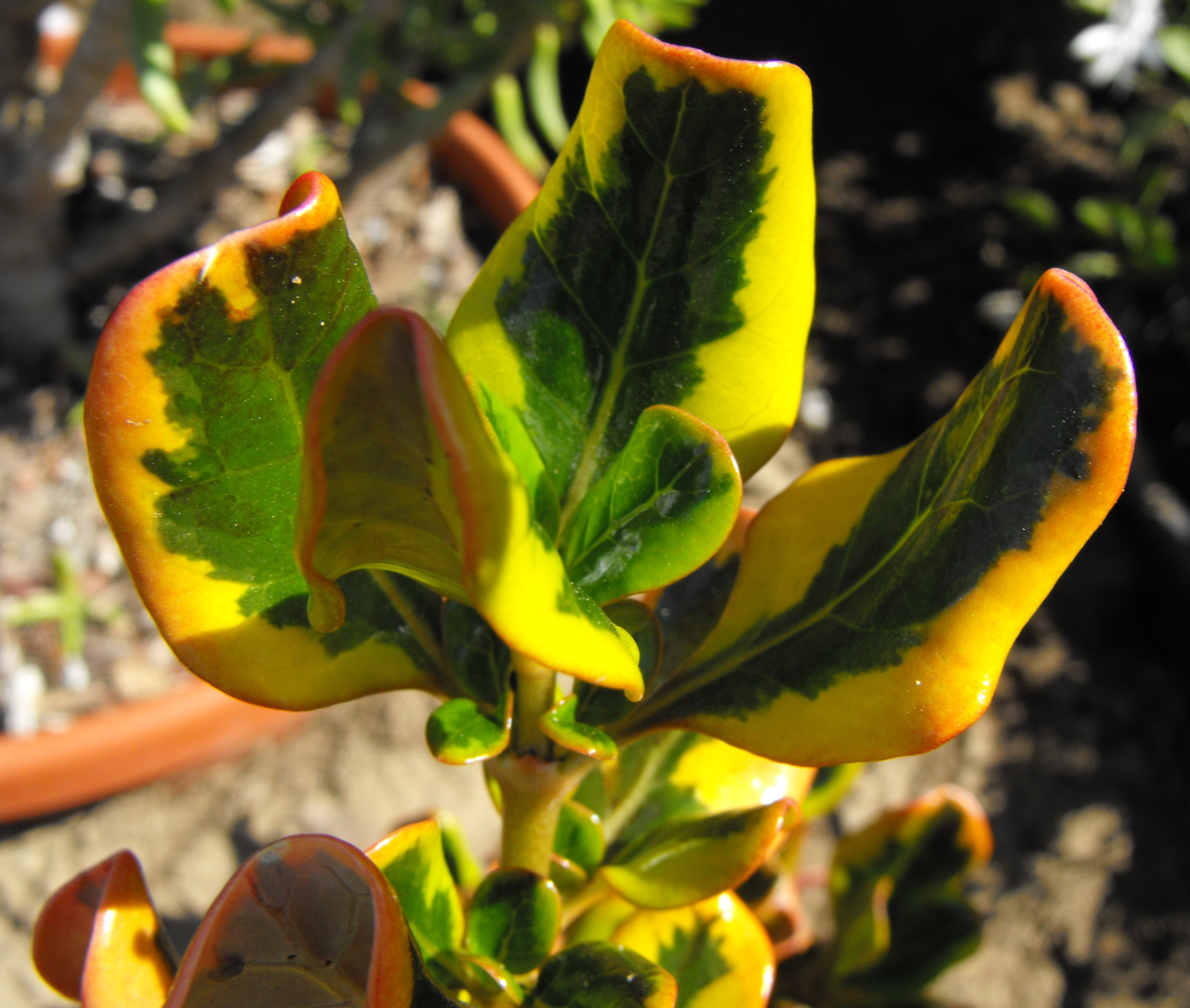

Scientific classification
- Kingdom: Plantae
- Clade: Tracheophytes
- Clade: Angiosperms
- Clade: Eudicots
- Clade: Asterids
- Order: Gentianales
- Family: Rubiaceae
- Genus: Coprosma
- Species: C. baueri

Binomial name
- Coprosma baueri Endl.

= Coprosma baueri =

Species of plant

Coprosma baueri is an endangered shrub species in the plant family Rubiaceae. It is endemic to Norfolk Island, including nearby Phillip Island. Convict artist John Doody drew this species in 1792, its first record. He noted it grew only where exposed to the sea and was seldom taller than 3.7 m. He also recorded that its fruit are good to eat. Ferdinand Bauer collected the type specimen in 1804–05. In 2003 only about 228 mature plants were known. By 2009 Mills reported the number of plants on Phillip Island had increased to 446, about 170 of which were taller than one metre. Until rabbits were eradicated from Phillip Island it had been very rare there.
