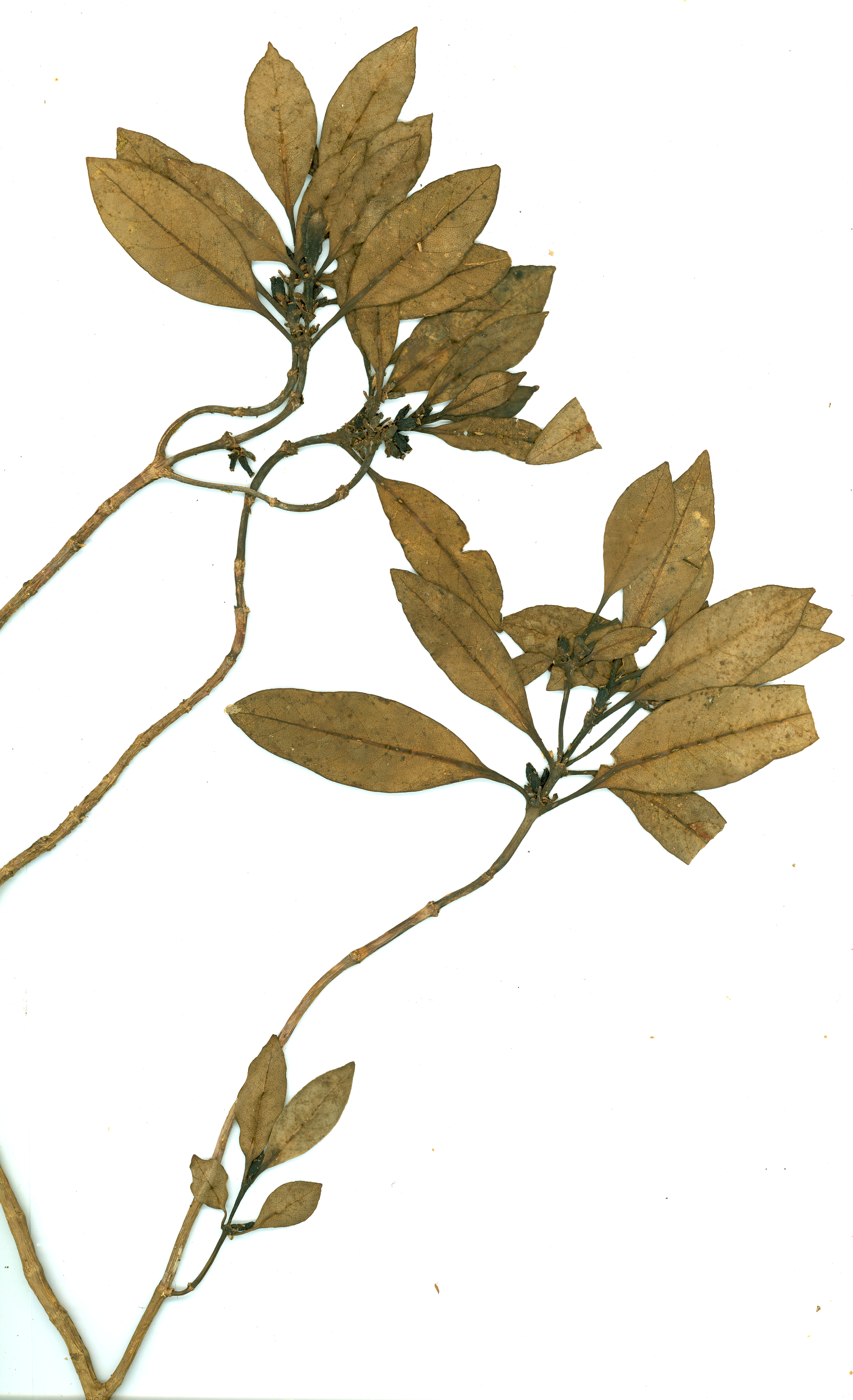
- Herbarium specimen

Scientific classification
- Kingdom: Plantae
- Clade: Tracheophytes
- Clade: Angiosperms
- Clade: Eudicots
- Clade: Asterids
- Order: Gentianales
- Family: Rubiaceae
- Genus: Coprosma
- Species: C. huttoniana

Binomial name
- Coprosma huttoniana P.S.Green

= Coprosma huttoniana =

Species of plant

Coprosma huttoniana is a flowering plant in the family Rubiaceae. The specific epithet honours Ian Hutton, the Lord Howe Island based naturalist who discovered the plant and recognised it as a new species.

== Description ==
It is a shrub or small tree growing to 4 m in height. The elliptic-ovate to narrowly elliptic leaves are 20–60 mm long, 13–25 mm wide, with a slightly foetid odour when bruised. The small green flowers are 8 mm long.. The ellipsoidal, reddish-orange fruits are 10 mm long. The flowering season is from May to July.

== Distribution and habitat ==
The species is endemic to Australia’s subtropical Lord Howe Island in the Tasman Sea. It is common in the island's montane forests from an elevation of about 500 m upwards.
