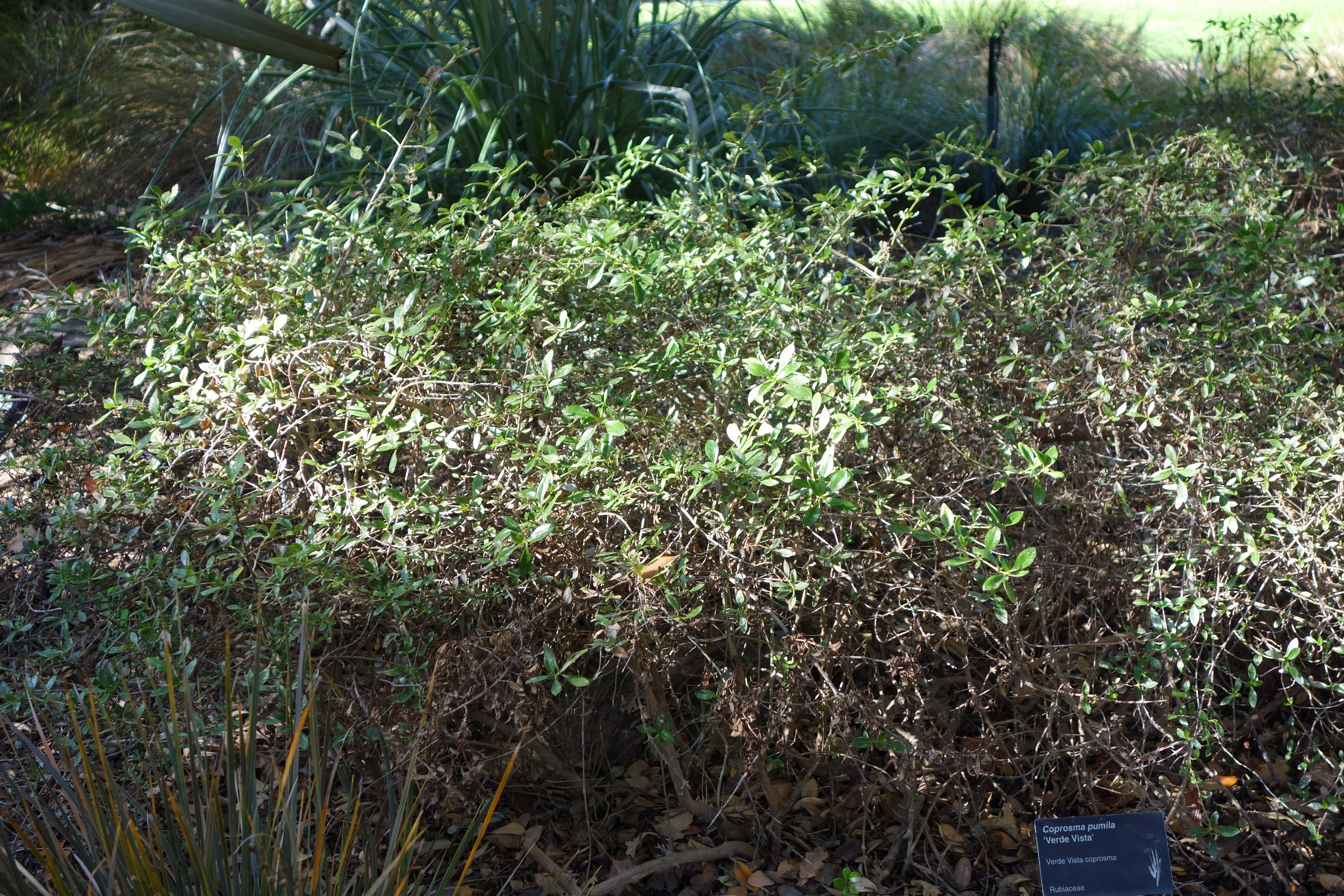
- Coprosma pumila 'Verde Vista'

Scientific classification
- Kingdom: Plantae
- Clade: Tracheophytes
- Clade: Angiosperms
- Clade: Eudicots
- Clade: Asterids
- Order: Gentianales
- Family: Rubiaceae
- Genus: Coprosma
- Species: C. pumila

Binomial name
- Coprosma pumila Hook.f.

= Coprosma pumila =

Species of plant

Coprosma pumila is an evergreen shrub found in Australia and New Zealand.
