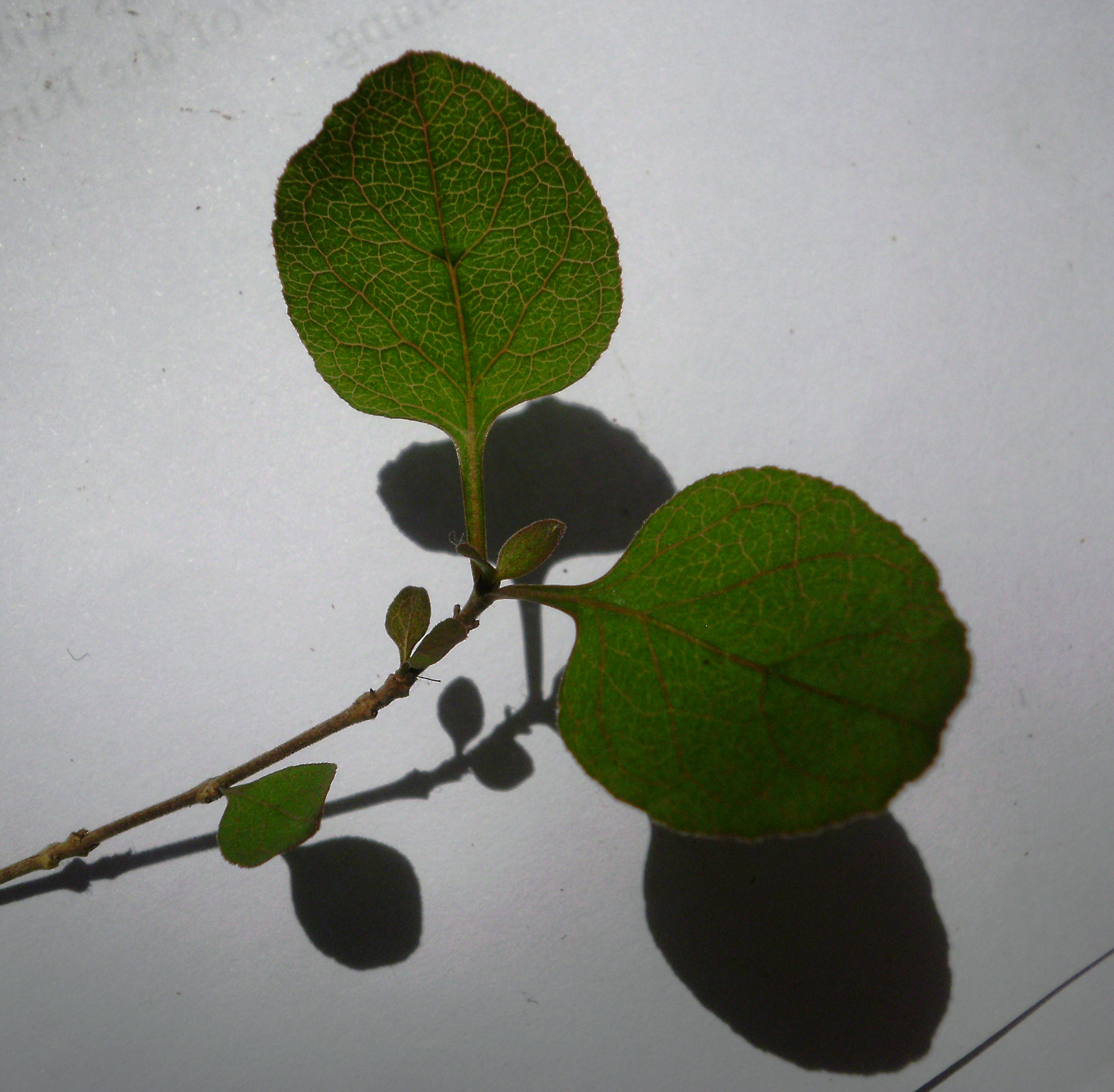
- The leaves of Coprosma rubra

Scientific classification
- Kingdom: Plantae
- Clade: Tracheophytes
- Clade: Angiosperms
- Clade: Eudicots
- Clade: Asterids
- Order: Gentianales
- Family: Rubiaceae
- Genus: Coprosma
- Species: C. rubra

Binomial name
- Coprosma rubra Petrie

= Coprosma rubra =

Species of plant

Coprosma rubra is a shrub native to New Zealand.

Coprosma rubra is found in both the North and South Island's from lowland to montane areas. It is often found in riparian forest or shrubland on alluvial soils.

Coprosma rubra grows to 4 metres high with red-brown bark and slender branches. The fruit is yellowish-white, oblong and up to 6mm long.
