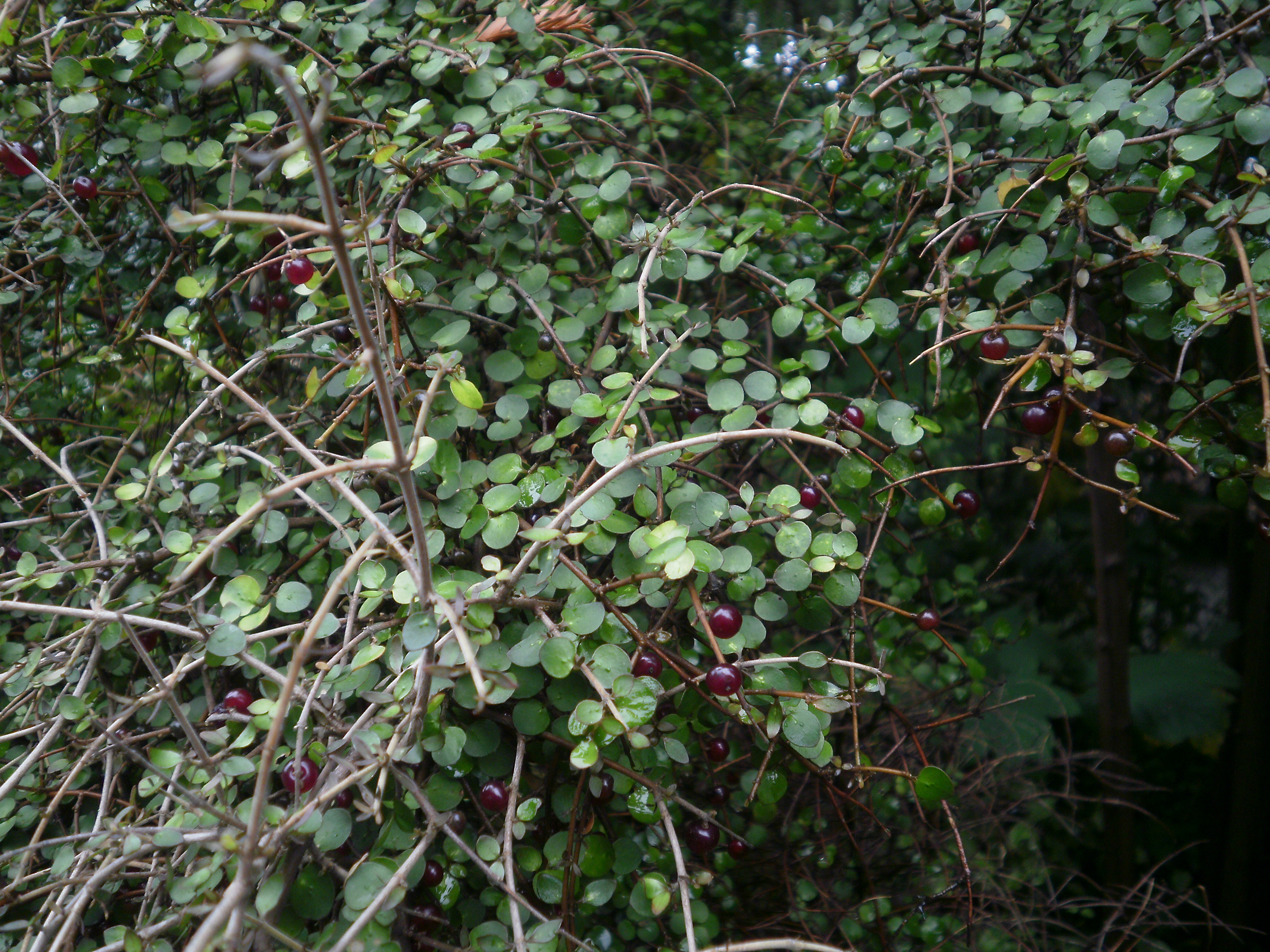
- Coprosma rhamnoides

Scientific classification
- Kingdom: Plantae
- Clade: Tracheophytes
- Clade: Angiosperms
- Clade: Eudicots
- Clade: Asterids
- Order: Gentianales
- Family: Rubiaceae
- Subfamily: Rubioideae
- Tribe: Anthospermeae
- Genus: Coprosma; J.R.Forst. & G.Forst.

Synonyms
- Caprosma G.Don; Eurynome DC.; Marquisia A.Rich. ex DC.; Pelaphia Banks & Sol. ex A.Cunn.

= Coprosma =

Genus of flowering plants

Coprosma is a genus of flowering plants, commonly known as coprosmas, in the family Rubiaceae. They are found in Borneo, Java, New Guinea, Australia, New Zealand, and smaller islands of the Pacific Ocean as far as the Hawaiian Islands and the Juan Fernández Islands of Chile.

== Description ==
The name Coprosma means "smelling like dung" and refers to the smell (methanethiol) given out by the crushed leaves of a few species.

Many species are shrubs or subshrubs with tiny evergreen leaves, while some are small trees, and some have much larger leaves. The flowers have insignificant petals and are wind-pollinated, with long anthers and stigmas. Most species are dioecious, but some species (particularly ones native to New Zealand) can sometimes have individuals with perfect flowers. Natural hybrids are common. The fruits are non-poisonous juicy berries variously coloured bright orange, red, blue, white, or colourless, most often containing two small seeds. They are good food for birds and those of the larger species were historically eaten by Māori children. A notable feature of the genus is the domatia, hollows on the leaf undersides in the axils of leaf veins, that encourage certain kinds of mites to take up residence, which feed on and reduce parasitic fungi which attack the leaf. Although some early research attributed to the domatia and stipules the ability to harbour nitrogen-fixing bacteria, more rigorous tests found this not to be the case.

Coprosma are in the Rubiaceae (coffee) family and a coffee-like beverage can be brewed from the seeds, although it does not contain any methylxanthines such as caffeine or theophylline.

== Species ==
- Coprosma acerosa A.Cunn. - sand coprosma - New Zealand (incl. Stewart Island and Chatham Islands)
- Coprosma acutifolia Hook.f. - Raoul Island
- Coprosma arborea Kirk - tree coprosma, mamangi - New Zealand
- Coprosma archboldiana Merr. & L.M.Perry - New Guinea
- Coprosma × arcuata Colenso - C. propinqua × C. robusta - New Zealand North Island
- Coprosma areolata Cheeseman - thin-leaved coprosma - New Zealand (incl. Stewart Island)
- Coprosma atropurpurea (Cockayne & Allan) L.B.Moore - New Zealand South Island
- Coprosma barbata Utteridge - New Guinea
- Coprosma baueri Endl. - Norfolk Island and Phillip Island
- Coprosma benefica W.R.B.Oliv. - Pitcairn Islands
- Coprosma bougainvilleensis Gideon - Solomon Islands
- Coprosma brassii Merr. & L.M.Perry - New Guinea
- Coprosma brunnea (Kirk) Cockayne - New Zealand South Island
- Coprosma × buchananii Kirk - C. crassifolia × C. robusta - southern New Zealand North Island
- Coprosma chathamica Cockayne - Chatham Islands
- Coprosma cheesemanii W.R.B.Oliv. - New Zealand (incl. Stewart Island)
- Coprosma ciliata Hook.f. - tree 7m tall - New Zealand, Antipodes Islands
- Coprosma colensoi Hook.f. - New Zealand (incl. Stewart Island)
- Coprosma × conferta A.Cunn. - C. propinqua × C. robusta - New Zealand
- Coprosma cookei Fosberg - Tuha'a Pae
- Coprosma cordicarpa Cantley, Spock-Koehler, and Chau - Maui
- Coprosma crassifolia Colenso - stiff, red-brown branches - New Zealand
- Coprosma crenulata W.R.B.Oliv. - New Zealand (incl. Stewart Island)
- Coprosma cuneata Hook.f. - New Zealand South Island, Stewart Island, Antipodes Islands
- Coprosma × cunninghamii Hook.f.
- Coprosma cymosa Hillebr. - Northwestern Hawaiian Islands
- Coprosma decurva Heads - New Zealand
- Coprosma depressa Colenso ex Hook.f. - New Zealand (incl. Stewart Island)
- Coprosma divergens W.R.B.Oliv. - Papua New Guinea
- Coprosma dodonaeifolia W.R.B.Oliv. - Great Barrier Island
- Coprosma dumosa (Cheeseman) G.T.Jane - New Zealand
- Coprosma elatirioides de Lange & A.S.Markey - New Zealand South Island
- Coprosma elegans Utteridge - New Guinea
- Coprosma elliptica W.R.B.Oliv. - Kauai
- Coprosma ernodeoides A.Gray - Hawaii, Maui
- Coprosma esulcata (F.Br.) Fosberg - Marquesas Islands
- Coprosma fatuhivaensis W.L.Wagner & Lorence - Marquesas Islands
- Coprosma fernandeziana ined. - Robinson Crusoe Island
- Coprosma foetidissima J.R.Forst. & G.Forst. - Stinkwood, a small New Zealand tree with foul-smelling leaves
- Coprosma foliosa A.Gray - Hawaiian Islands
- Coprosma fowerakeri D.A.Norton & de Lange - New Zealand South Island
- Coprosma glabrata J.W.Moore - Raiatea
- Coprosma × gracilicaulis Carse - C. rotundifolia × C. tenuicaulis - New Zealand North Island
- Coprosma × gracilis A.Cunn. - C. lucida × C. rhamnoides - New Zealand North Island
- Coprosma grandifolia Hook.f. kanono, a large bush with leaves 15 cm long or more; its bark contains an orange dye - New Zealand
- Coprosma hirtella Labill. - Tasmania, Victoria, New South Wales
- Coprosma hookeri Stapf - Sabah
- Coprosma huttoniana P.S.Green - Lord Howe Island
- Coprosma inopinata I.Hutton & P.S.Green - Lord Howe Island
- Coprosma intertexta G.Simpson - New Zealand South Island
- Coprosma kauensis (A.Gray) A.Heller - Kauai
- Coprosma × kirkii Cheeseman - C. acerosa × C. repens - New Zealand North Island
- Coprosma laevigata Cheeseman - Rarotonga
- Coprosma lanceolaris F.Muell. - Lord Howe Island
- Coprosma linariifolia (Hook.f.) Hook.f. - mikimiki, yellow wood - New Zealand
- Coprosma longifolia A.Gray - Oahu
- Coprosma lucida J.R.Forst. & G.Forst. karamu, a small tree
  - Coprosma lucida var. angustifolia Cheeseman - New Zealand North Island
  - Coprosma lucida var. lucida - New Zealand (incl. Stewart Island)
- Coprosma macrocarpa Cheeseman large-seeded coprosma - New Zealand North Island (incl. Three Kings Islands)
- Coprosma menziesii A.Gray - Hawaiian Islands
- Coprosma meyeri W.L.Wagner & Lorence - Marquesas Islands
- Coprosma microcarpa Hook.f. - New Zealand
- Coprosma × molokaiensis H.St.John - C. ochracea × C. ternata - Molokai
- Coprosma montana Hillebr. - Hawaii, eastern Maui
- Coprosma moorei F.Muell. ex Rodway - Tasmania, Victoria
- Coprosma myrtifolia Noronha - Java
- Coprosma neglecta Cheeseman - New Zealand North Island
- Coprosma nephelephila J.Florence - Marquesas Islands
- Coprosma niphophila Orchard - New Zealand South Island, New South Wales
- Coprosma nitida Hook.f. - Tasmania, Victoria, New South Wales
- Coprosma nivalis W.R.B.Oliv. - Tasmania, Victoria, New South Wales
- Coprosma novaehebridae W.R.B.Oliv. - Vanuatu
- Coprosma obconica Kirk
  - Coprosma obconica subsp. distantia de Lange & R.O.Gardner - New Zealand North Island
  - Coprosma obconica subsp. obconica - New Zealand
- Coprosma ochracea W.R.B.Oliv. - Hawaiian Islands
- Coprosma oliveri Fosberg - Robinson Crusoe Island
- Coprosma papuensis W.R.B.Oliv.
  - Coprosma papuensis subsp. discolor (P.Royen) R.O.Gardner - New Guinea
  - Coprosma papuensis subsp. mopaensis R.O.Gardner - New Guinea
  - Coprosma papuensis subsp. papuensis - New Guinea
- Coprosma parviflora Hook.f. - Leafy Coprosma - New Zealand
- Coprosma pedicellata Molly - New Zealand
- Coprosma perpusilla Colenso
  - Coprosma perpusilla subsp. perpusilla - Tasmania, Victoria, New South Wales, New Zealand (incl. Stewart Island)
  - Coprosma perpusilla subsp. subantarctica Orchard - Macquarie Island, Antipodes Islands
- Coprosma persicifolia A.Gray - Fiji
- Coprosma petiolata Hook.f. - Kermadec Islands
- Coprosma petriei Cheeseman - mirror plant - New Zealand
- Coprosma pilosa Endl. - Norfolk Island
- Coprosma polymorpha W.R.B.Oliv. - New Zealand South Island (incl. Stewart Island)
- Coprosma prisca W.R.B.Oliv. - Lord Howe Island
- Coprosma propinqua A.Cunn. - mingimingi
  - Coprosma propinqua var. latiuscula Allan - New Zealand
  - Coprosma propinqua var. martini W.R.B.Oliv. - Chatham Islands
  - Coprosma propinqua var. propinqua - New Zealand (incl. Stewart Island)
- Coprosma pseudociliata G.T.Jane - New Zealand
- Coprosma pseudocuneata W.R.B.Oliv. - New Zealand
- Coprosma pubens A.Gray - Hawaiian Islands
- Coprosma pumila Hook.f. - Tasmania, Victoria
- Coprosma putida C.Moore & F.Muell. - Lord Howe Island
- Coprosma pyrifolia (Hook. & Arn.) Skottsb. - Juan Fernández Islands
- Coprosma quadrifida (Labill.) Rob. - Tasmania, Victoria, New South Wales
- Coprosma raiateensis J.W.Moore - Raiatea
- Coprosma rapensis F.Br. - Tuha'a Pae, Pitcairn Islands
- Coprosma repens A.Rich. - taupata, mirror plant - native to New Zealand, naturalized in Australia (Tasmania, Victoria, New South Wales, South Australia)
- Coprosma reticulata J.Florence - Marquesas Islands
- Coprosma rhamnoides A.Cunn. - twiggy coprosma - New Zealand (incl. Stewart Island)
- Coprosma rhynchocarpa A.Gray - Hawaii
- Coprosma rigida Cheeseman - New Zealand
- Coprosma robusta Raoul - karamu - New Zealand, Chatham Is., naturalized in Australia (Tasmania, Victoria)
- Coprosma rotundifolia A.Cunn. - New Zealand (incl. Stewart Island)
- Coprosma rubra Petrie - New Zealand
- Coprosma rugosa Cheeseman - needle-leaved mountain coprosma - New Zealand, Antipodes Islands
- Coprosma savaiiensis Rech. - Samoa
- Coprosma serrulata Hook.f. ex Buchanan - New Zealand South Island
- Coprosma setosa J.W.Moore - Raiatea
- Coprosma spathulata A.Cunn.
  - Coprosma spathulata subsp. hikuruana de Lange & Heenan - New Zealand North Island
  - Coprosma spathulata subsp. spathulata - New Zealand North Island
- Coprosma stephanocarpa Hillebr. - Maui
- Coprosma strigulosa Lauterb. - Samoa
- Coprosma sundana Miq. - Java
- Coprosma × tadgellii W.R.B.Oliv. - C. nitida × C. nivalis - Victoria
- Coprosma tahitensis A.Gray - Tahiti, Tuha'a Pae
- Coprosma talbrockiei L.B.Moore & R.Mason - Victoria, New Zealand South Island
- Coprosma temetiuensis W.L.Wagner & Lorence - Marquesas Islands
- Coprosma tenuicaulis Hook. - swamp coprosma - New Zealand
- Coprosma tenuifolia Cheeseman - wavy-leaved coprosma - New Zealand North Island
- Coprosma ternata W.R.B.Oliv. - Molokai
- Coprosma velutina Fosberg - Tuha'a Pae
- Coprosma virescens Petrie - New Zealand
- Coprosma waima A.P.Druce - New Zealand North Island
- Coprosma waimeae Wawra - Kauai
- Coprosma wallii Petrie - New Zealand South Island
- Coprosma wollastonii Wernham
  - Coprosma wollastonii var. epiphytica (P.Royen) R.O.Gardner - New Guinea
  - Coprosma wollastonii var. novoguineensis (Merr. & L.M.Perry) R.O.Gardner - New Guinea
  - Coprosma wollastonii var. wollastonii - Sulawesi, New Guinea
