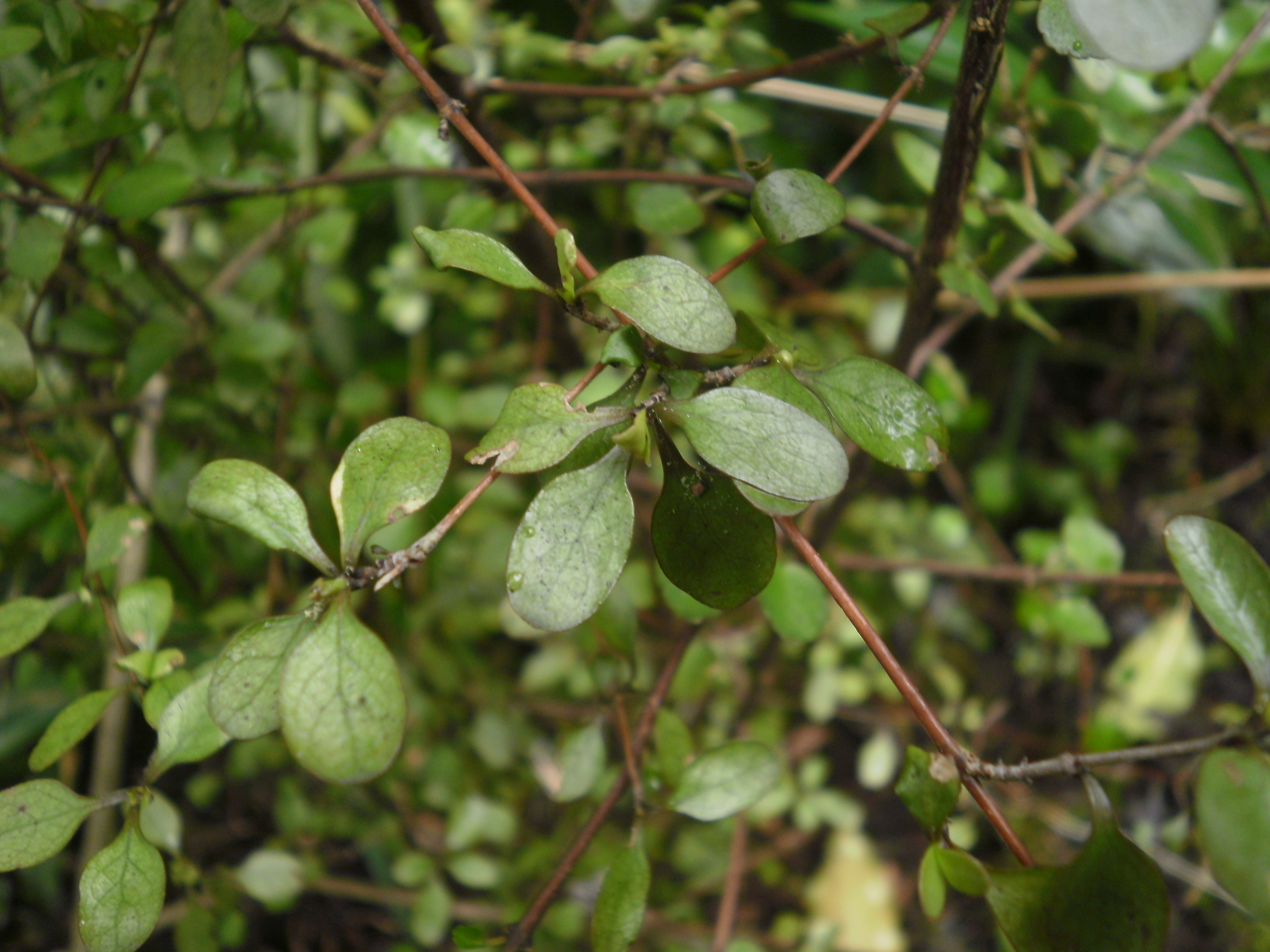

Scientific classification
- Kingdom: Plantae
- Clade: Tracheophytes
- Clade: Angiosperms
- Clade: Eudicots
- Clade: Asterids
- Order: Gentianales
- Family: Rubiaceae
- Genus: Coprosma
- Species: C. rigida

Binomial name
- Coprosma rigida Cheeseman, 1887

= Coprosma rigida =

Species of plant

Coprosma rigida, is a shrub that is native to New Zealand. C. rigida grows to 4 metres high and is found in shady, damp forest areas with poor drainage. Typical habitat for it is on river banks and forest edges.

Coprosma rigida produces yellow fruit.
