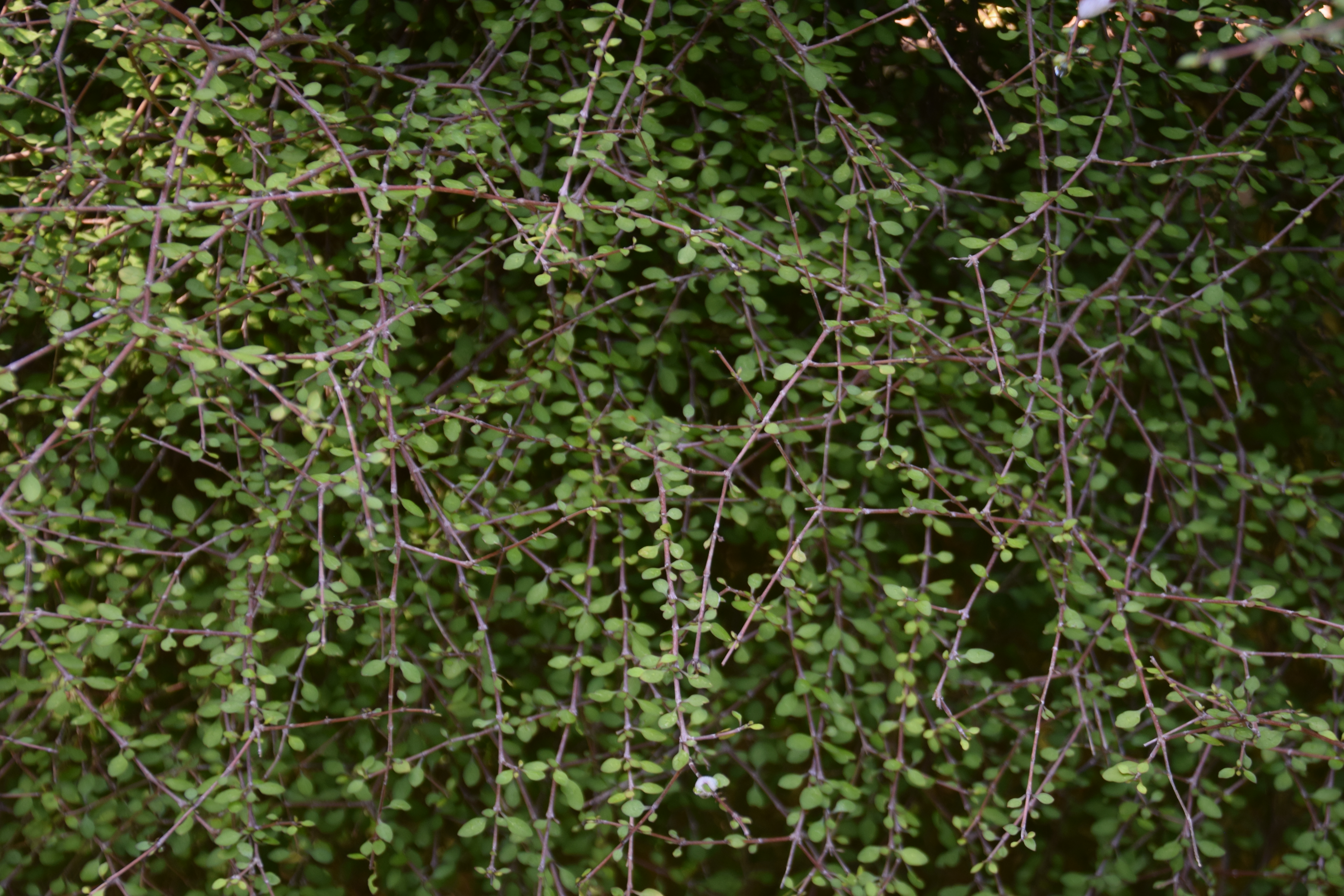

Scientific classification
- Kingdom: Plantae
- Clade: Tracheophytes
- Clade: Angiosperms
- Clade: Eudicots
- Clade: Asterids
- Order: Gentianales
- Family: Rubiaceae
- Genus: Coprosma
- Species: C. virescens

Binomial name
- Coprosma virescens Petrie.

= Coprosma virescens =

Species of plant

Coprosma virescens is an endemic New Zealand plant in the genus Coprosma of the family Rubiaceae. Its Māori name (in common New Zealand usage) is mikimiki, a name which is also applied to closely related species such as C. dumosa, C. rhamnoides, C. propinqua and C. crassifolia. It is a small-leaved evergreen shrub or tree which grows 2–3 metres (6 ft 7 in – 9 ft 10 in) high. It has very slender, more or less glabrous divaricating branches. The small leaves are petiolate with petioles from 2–5 millimetres (0.079–0.197 in) long. The leaves narrow suddenly at the petiole and may be up to 9 millimetres (0.35 in) long and 6 millimetres (0.24 in) wide with wavy margins or a few blunt teeth throughout South Island in lower montane forest and scrubland. The apetalous male flowers occur in axillary clusters of one to two on very short branches. Female flowers are found on their own at the ends of short branchlets.

The fruit is an oblong drupe, yellow to white in colour and up to 6 millimetres (0.24 in) long. However, the fruit appears greenish when ripe because of the visible presence of the green seeds within. This feature gives rise to the specific name.

It has a wide distribution, and is found in both the North and South Islands. In the North Island it is found from the Gisborne ranges and south from Taihape. In the South Island it is common from Canterbury southwards, extending to Southland. It is not found in Westland, and is uncommon in the remaining South Island regions. Through much of its range it is uncommon or absent.

C. virescens is popular in cultivation because of its tangled twiggy growth form, and that it will tolerate a wide range of soils and conditions.
