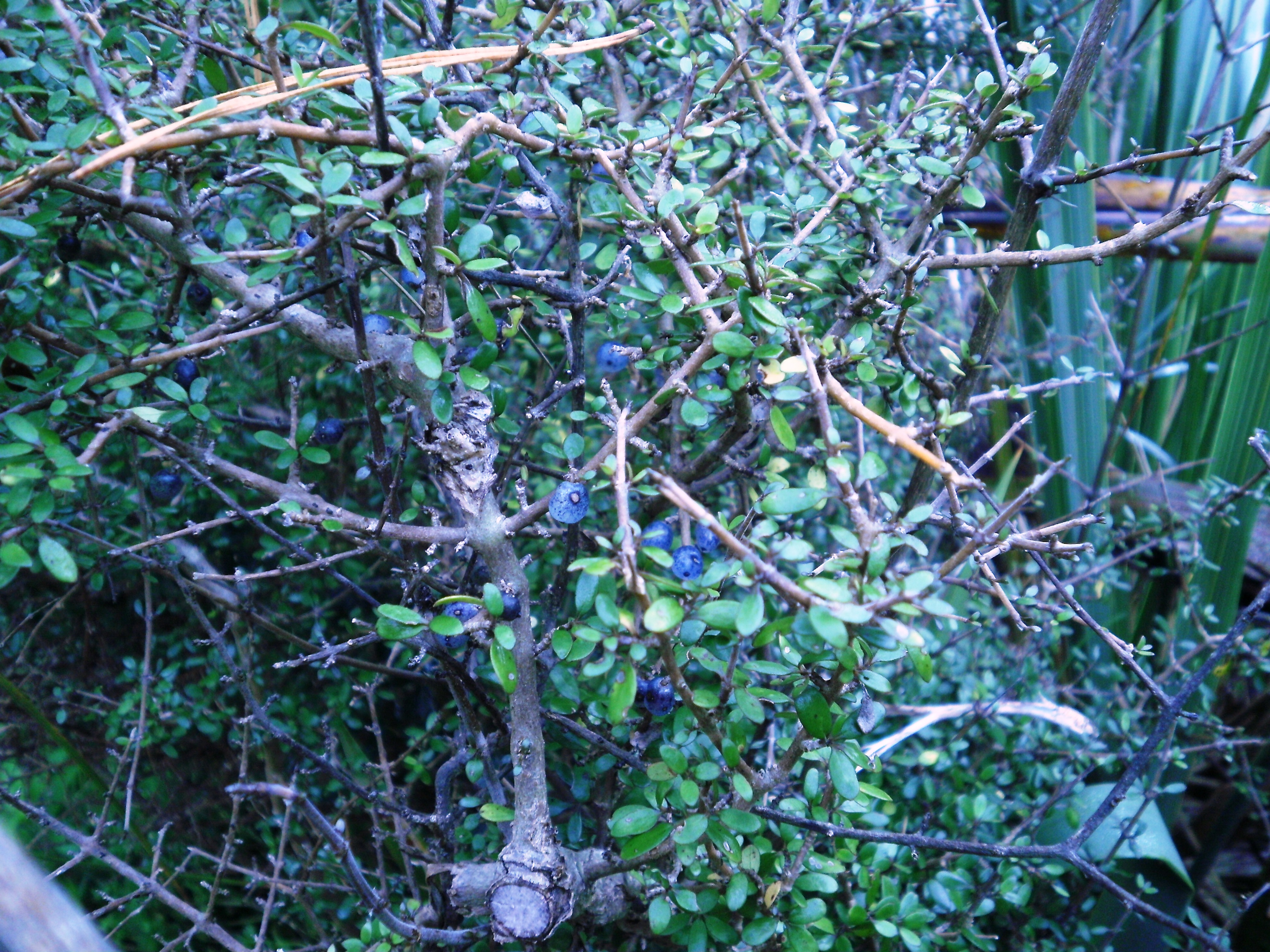

Scientific classification
- Kingdom: Plantae
- Clade: Tracheophytes
- Clade: Angiosperms
- Clade: Eudicots
- Clade: Asterids
- Order: Gentianales
- Family: Rubiaceae
- Genus: Coprosma
- Species: C. propinqua

Binomial name
- Coprosma propinqua A.Cunn.

= Coprosma propinqua =

Species of plant

Coprosma propinqua is a New Zealand plant of the genus Coprosma in the family Rubiaceae. It is a widely-distributed small leaved divaricating shrub found throughout New Zealand.

== Taxonomy and nomenclature ==
Its Māori name is mingimingi (or mikimiki in the Kāi Tahu dialect), a name which is also applied to closely related species such as C. dumosa, C. rhamnoides, C. virescens and C. crassifolia, as well as unrelated plants like Acrothamnus colensoi. A common English name is black scrub.

Its specific epithet propinqua means "related to another species", supposedly to C. parviflora.

== Description ==
C. propinqua is a small-leaved shrub or tree which grows 3 to 6 metres high, sometimes reaching 7 m. It has divaricating branches with grey bark, and the plant can appear almost black from a distance. The leaves are dark green, thick, and linear-oblong to linear-ovate; they often have two small pits (domatia) visible on the pale underside. Juvenile leaves are more variable and thinner.

The male flowers occur in axillary clusters of one to four on very short branches. Female flowers are found on their own at the ends of short branchlets. Flowering is from August to September, fruiting March to April. The fruit is a drupe up to 8 mm long, pale when immature, turning translucent dark blue or blue-flecked to indigo when mature. Sometimes the fruit is yellow or white.

Coprosma propinqua freely hybridizes with C. robusta (karamū) and can form extensive hybrid swarms. The hybrids has 3–5 cm long glossy trowel-shaped leaves, and can backcross with either parent to have intermediate leaves, some as small as 2 cm.

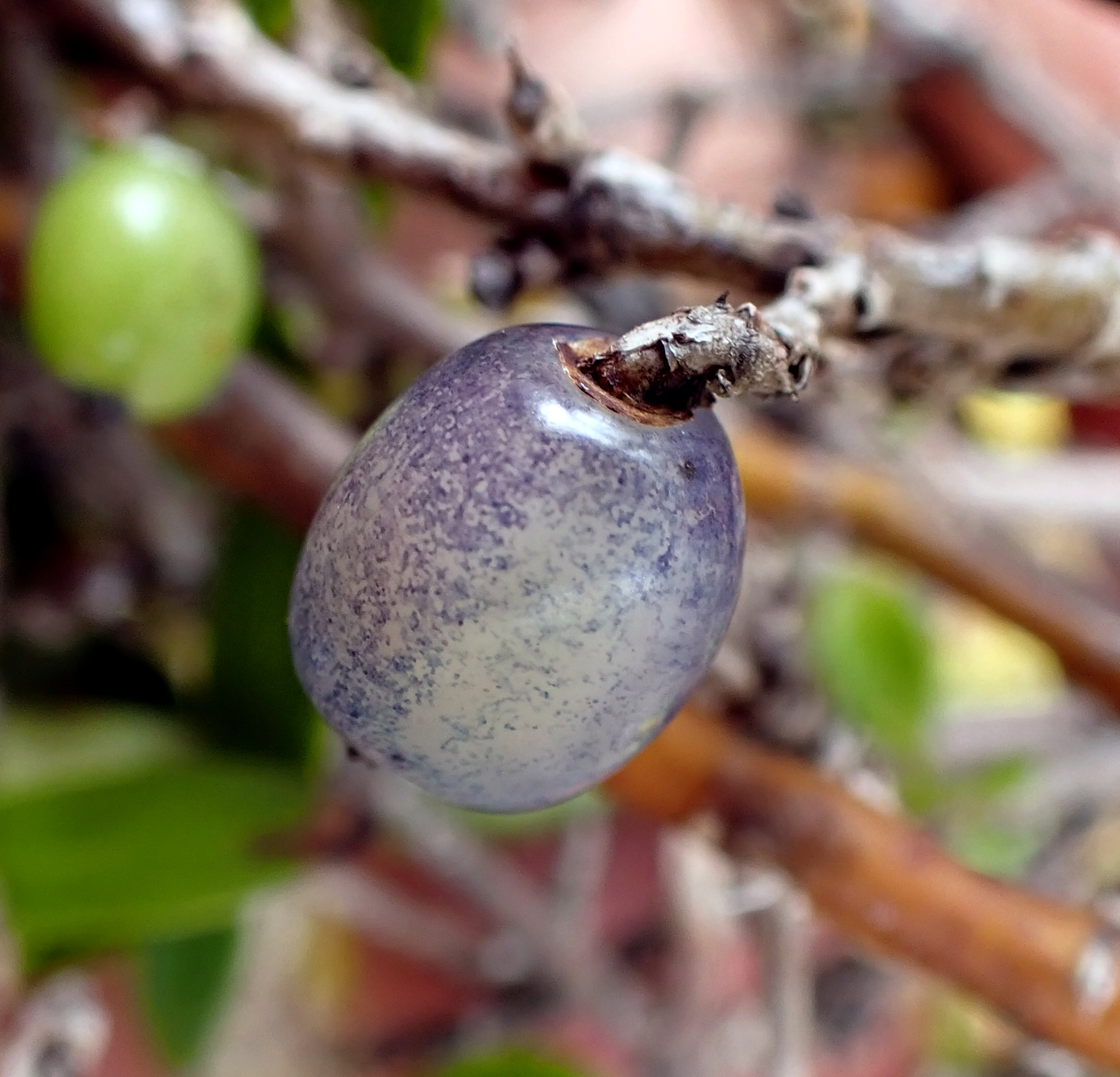
Blue-flecked fruit

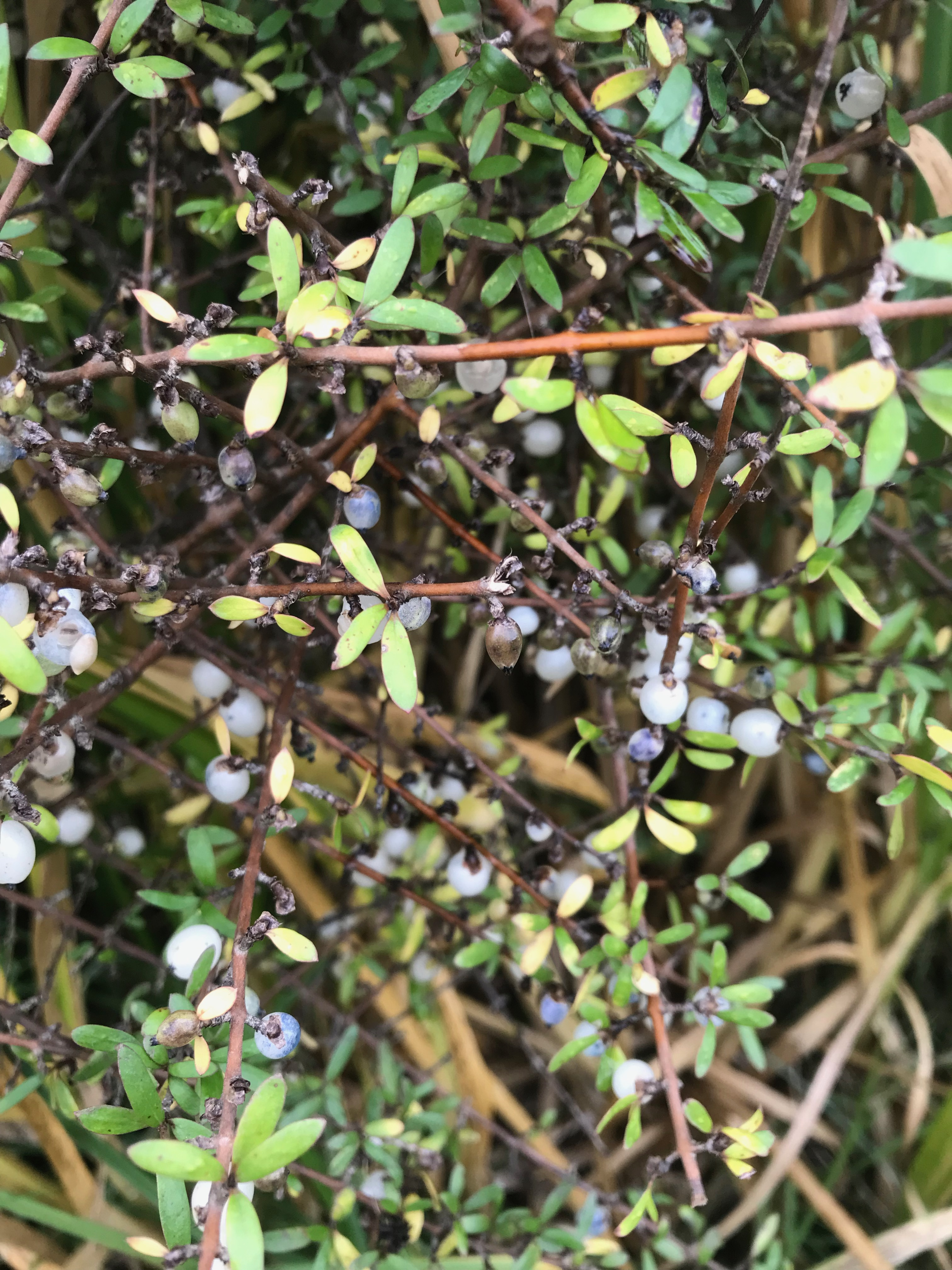
Pale fruit

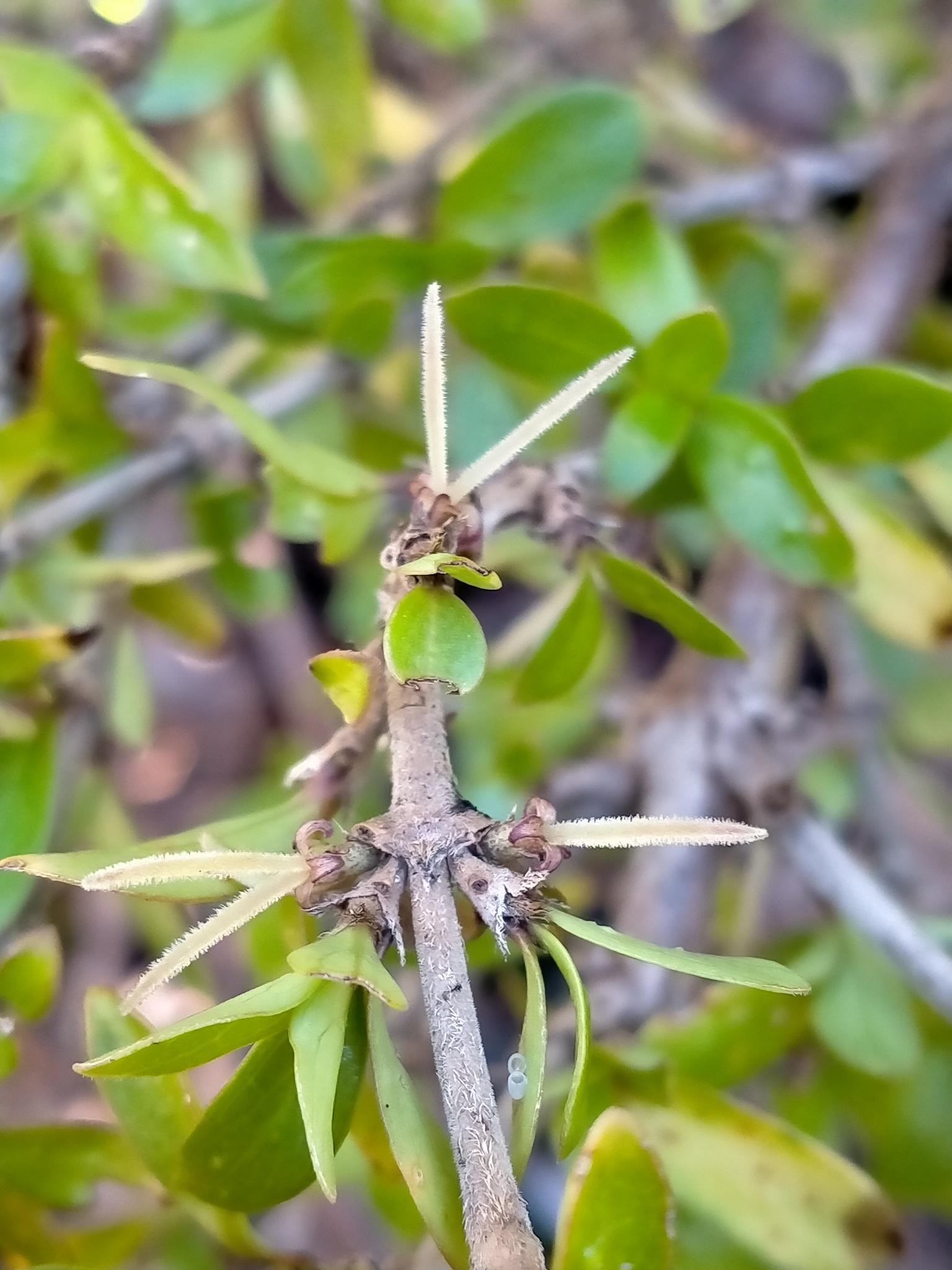
Leaves

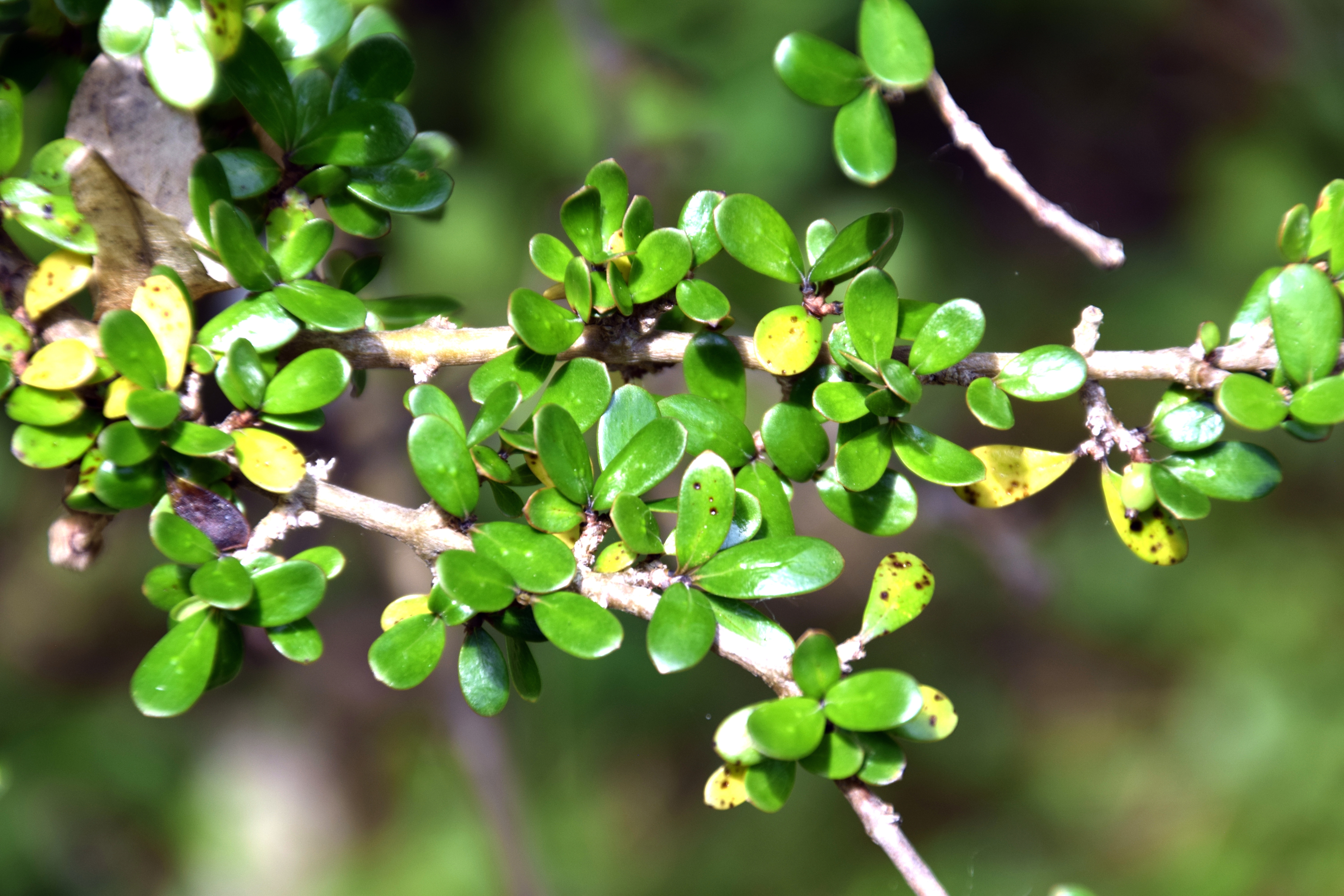
Leaves

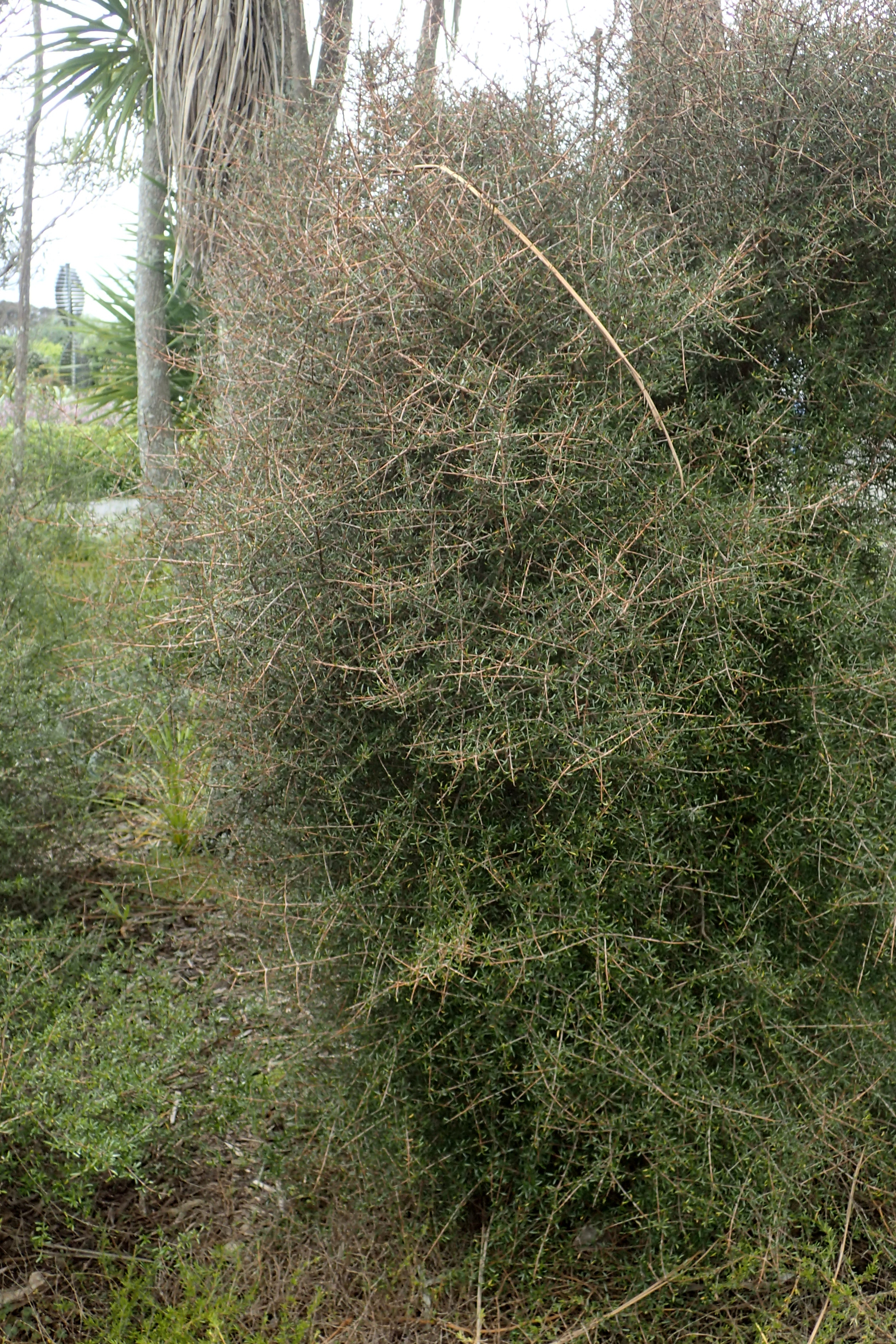
Divaricating form

== Distribution ==
This species is common in forest, swamp, montane scrubland, along stream banks, and in stony places and cliffs. It is one of the most widely-distributed Coprosma species in New Zealand, ranging from Mangōnui in the North Island to as far south as Stewart Island, (var. propinqua) and in the Chatham Islands (var. martinii).
