= Barrytown (disambiguation) =

Barrytown may refer to:

== Places ==
=== New Zealand ===
- Barrytown – West Coast town on the South Island
- Barrytown Flats – coastal plain near Barrytown

=== United States ===
- Barrytown, Alabama
- Barrytown, New York

== Other uses ==
- The Barrytown Trilogy – also known as The Barrytown Pentalogy by Roddy Doyle
- Barrytown – song by Steely Dan on their Pretzel Logic album
