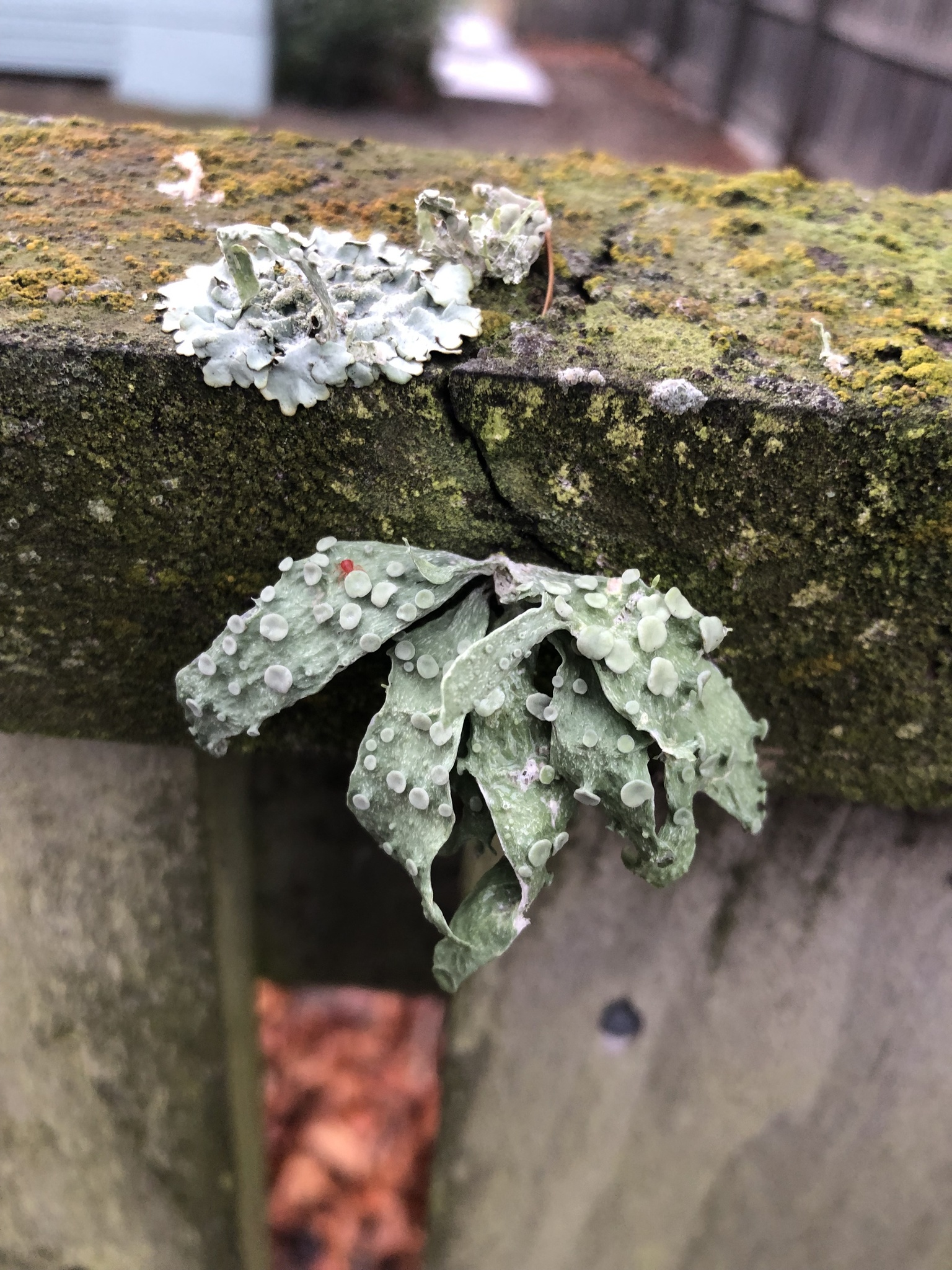

Scientific classification
- Kingdom: Fungi
- Division: Ascomycota
- Class: Lecanoromycetes
- Order: Lecanorales
- Family: Ramalinaceae
- Genus: Ramalina
- Species: R. ovalis

Binomial name
- Ramalina ovalis Hook. f. & Taylor

Synonyms
- Synonymy: Ramalina calicaris var. ovalis (Hook. f. & Taylor) Bab.; Ramalina celastri subsp. ovalis (Hook. f. & Taylor) G.N. Stevens; Ramalina ecklonii var. ovalis (Hook. f. & Taylor) F. Wilson; Ramalina yemensis var. ovalis (Hook. f. & Taylor) Zahlbr.; Ramalina yemensis subsp. ovalis (Hook. f. & Taylor) Nyl.

= Ramalina ovalis =

Species of lichen

Ramalina ovalis is a species of corticolous lichen (bark-dwelling), in the family Ramalinaceae. First described in 1844, the species is found in Australia, New Zealand, and high altitude areas of Africa.

== Description ==
Ramalina ovalis is green-grey in colour, and has erect branches typically measuring between 1–5 cm (0.39–1.97 in) in length, with a width of between 4–25 mm (0.16–0.98 in). Typically one or two branches make up the majority of the thallus. The species has blunt or rounded apices and laminal apothecia.

== Taxonomy ==
The species was first described in 1844 by Joseph Dalton Hooker and Thomas Taylor. The taxon has been recombined and considered a subspecies or variety several times, including in 1860 when Cardale Babington described the taxon as a variety of Ramalina calicaris, in 1893 as a variety of Ramalina ecklonii by Francis Wilson, in 1930 Alexander Zahlbruckner who called the taxon Ramalina yemensis var. ovalis and in 1987 by Gweneth Nell Stevens, who described the taxon as Ramalina celastri subsp. ovalis. In 2014, the taxon was restored to species rank based on phylogenetic analysis showing that the clade was genetically distinct from Ramalina celastri, as well as morphological and geographic range differences.

== Distribution and habitat ==
The species is found in Australia, New Zealand, and higher altitude areas of Africa, including Tanzania and Uganda. In New Zealand, it is common in drier parts of the eastern South Island, and typically in southern areas of Australia. The species grows on the bark of a wide range of trees and shrubs, including Carmichaelia, Coprosma crassifolia, the common hawthorn, apple trees, Prunus domestica, willows, and typically in Australia on Acacia.

== Gallery ==
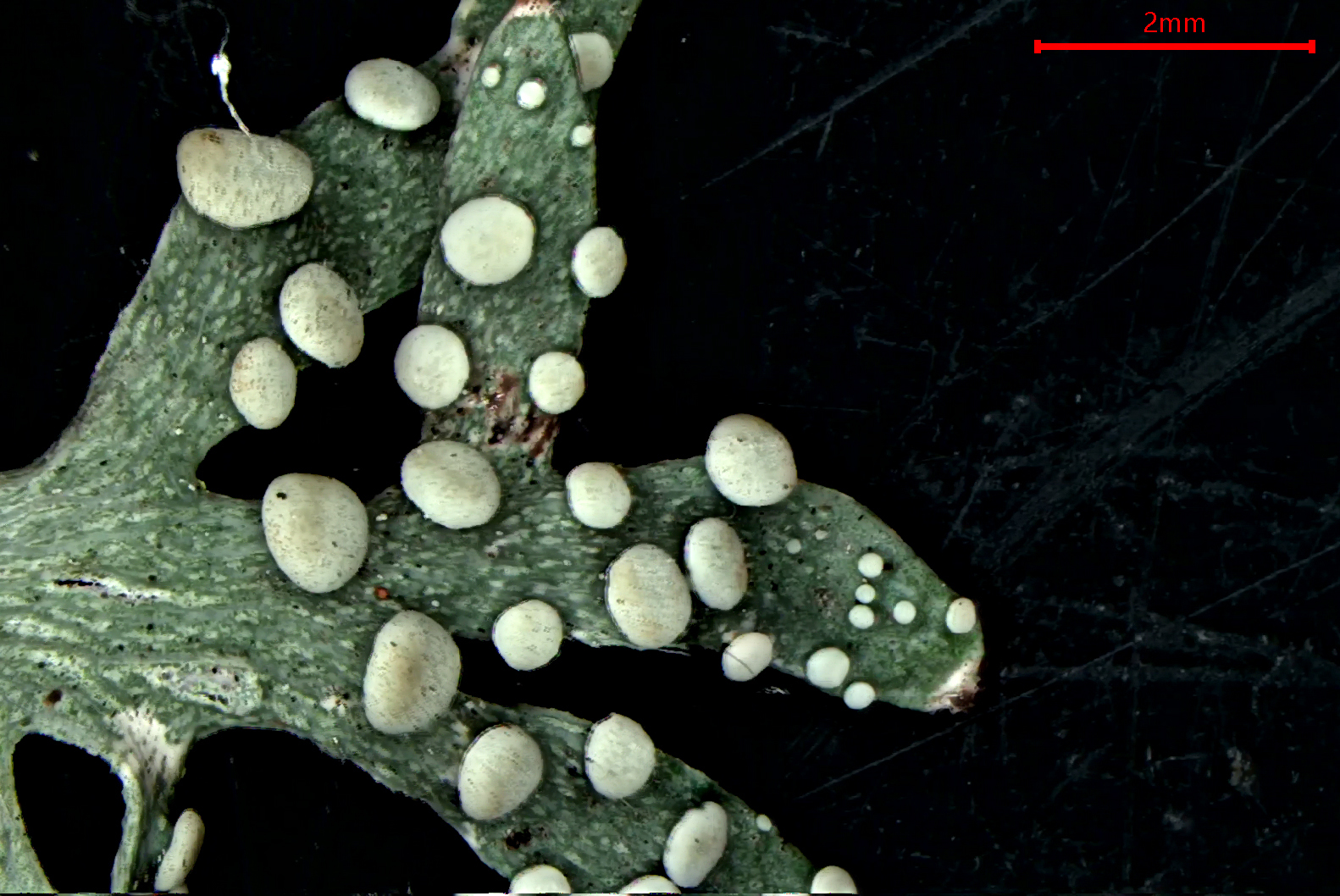

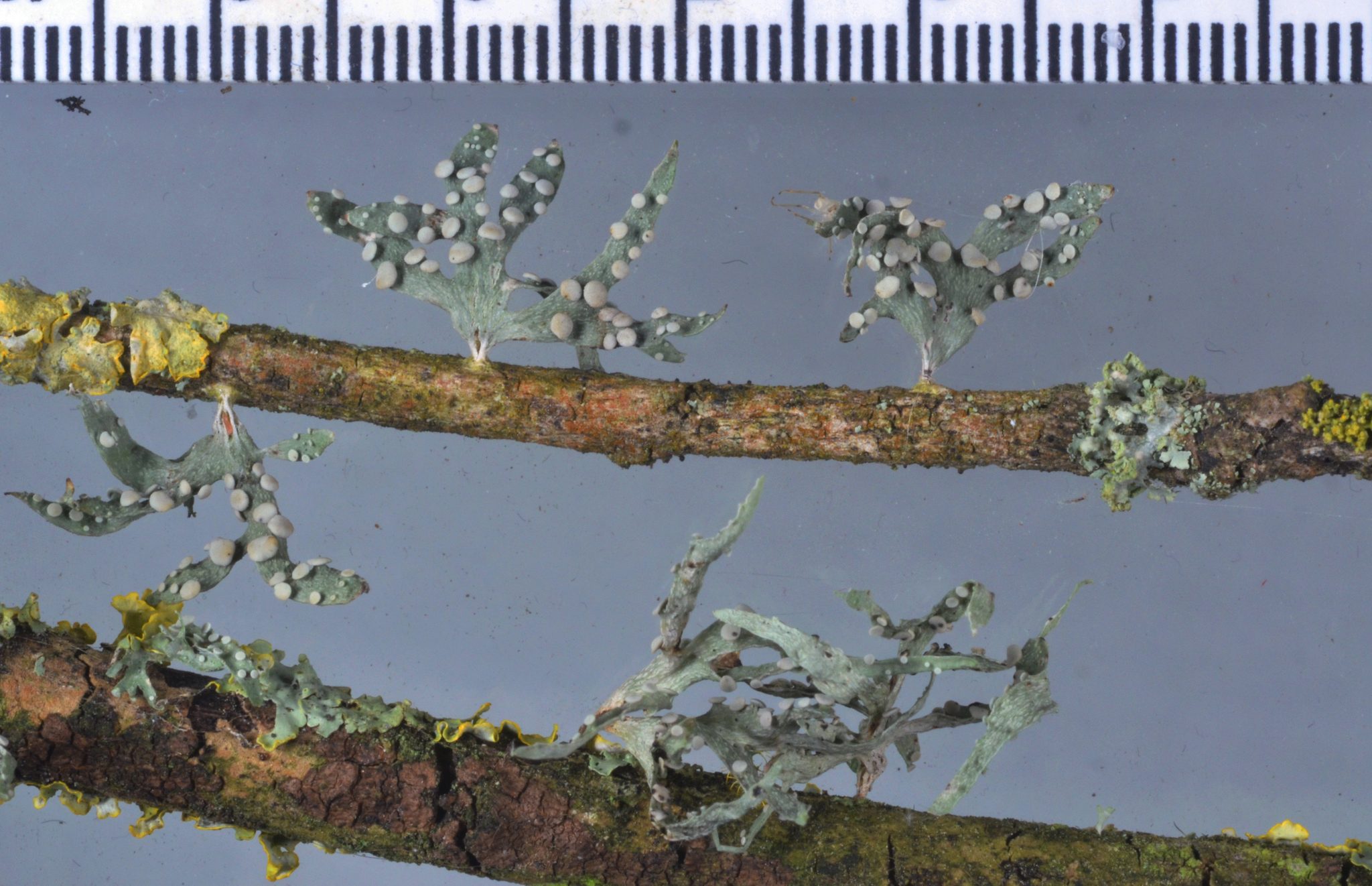

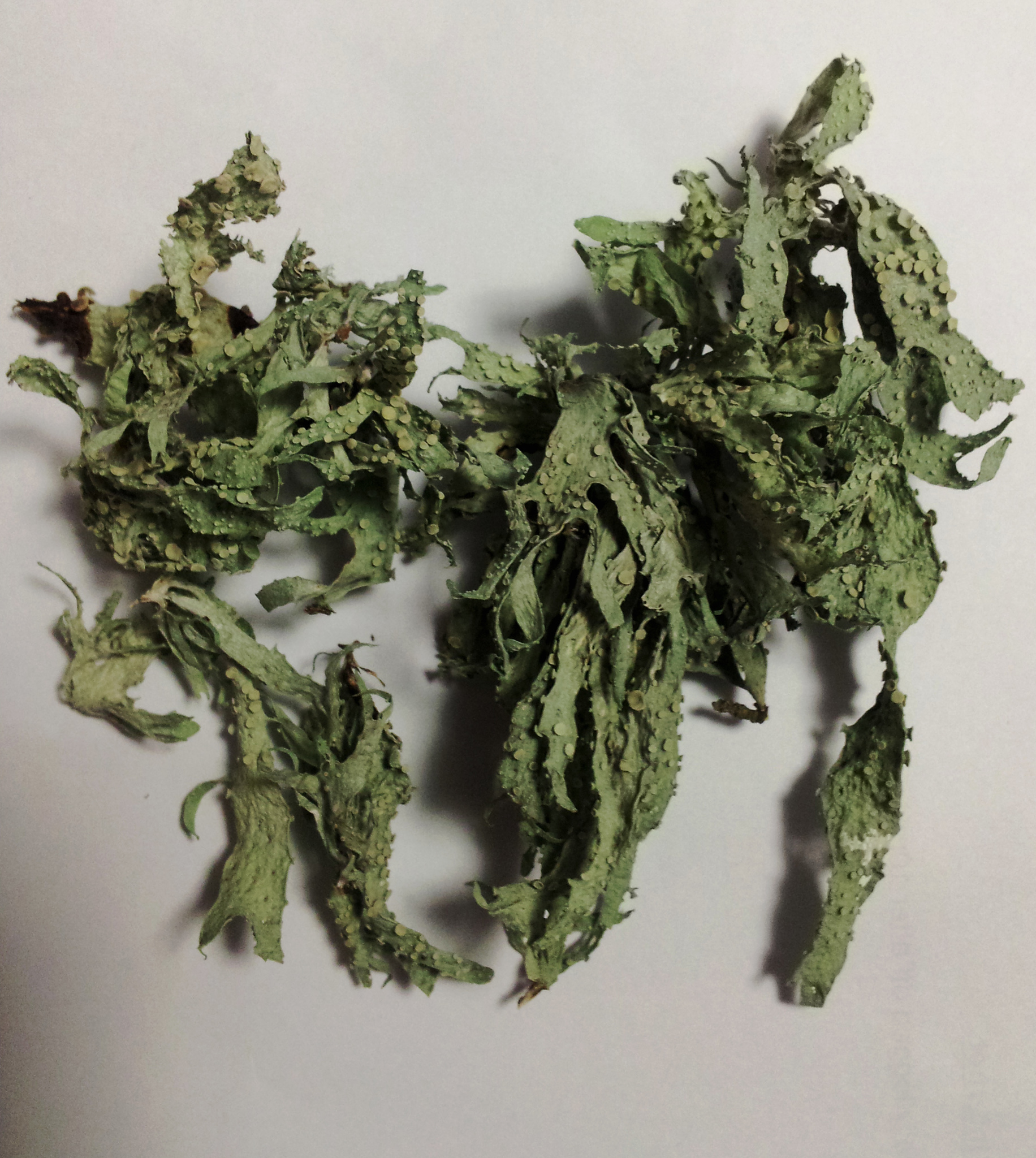
