= Barrytown Flats =

Coastal plain in the South Island of New Zealand

- Plain
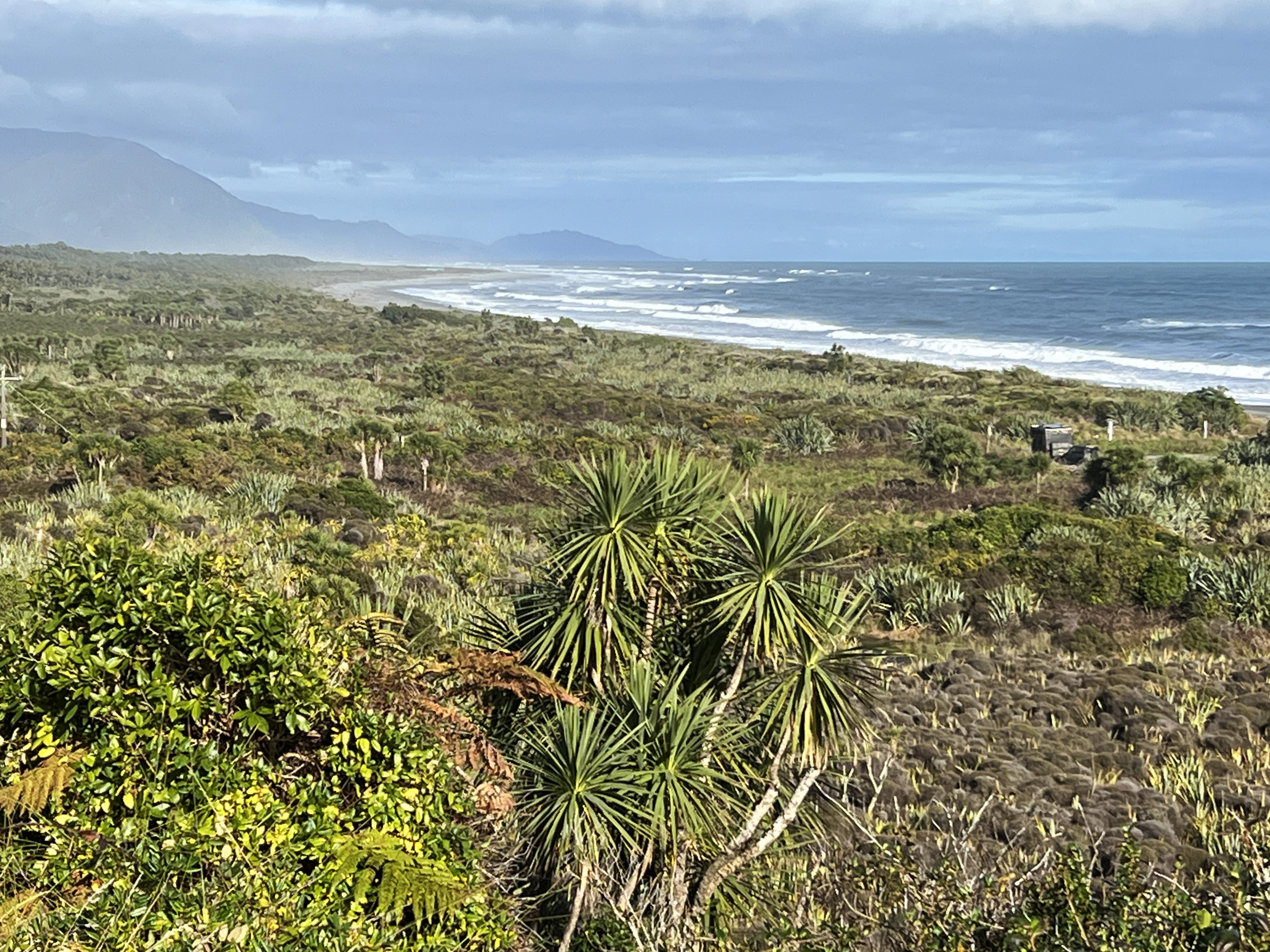
- View of Barrytown Flats from Razorback Point
- Interactive map of Barrytown Flats
- Coordinates: 42°14′38″S 171°19′35″E
- Location: West Coast, New Zealand
- Age: 6,500 years
- Formed by: Glacial outwash

Dimensions
  - Length: 17 km
  - Width: 1.5 km
- Elevation: 10 m (33 ft)
- Highest elevation: 30 m

The Barrytown Flats are a 17 km (11 mi) coastal plain north of Greymouth on the West Coast of New Zealand's South Island. A series of postglacial shorelines and dunes backed by a former sea cliff, they was originally covered with wetland and lowland forest, including numerous nīkau palms (the southern limit of this species on the West Coast). The sands were extensively sluiced and dredged for gold from the 1860s, centred on the small settlement of Barrytown. The drier areas of the flats have been converted into pasture, but significant areas of forest remain, including Nikau Scenic Reserve. The flats are bordered by Paparoa National Park and the only breeding site of the Westland petrel (Procellaria westlandica). There are significant deposits of ilmenite (titanium dioxide) in the Barrytown sands, and there have been several mining proposals. Consents for a sand mining operation were granted in 2024 following a three year consenting process. The mining operation will extract 4.8 million tonnes of mineral sands over an area of 63 ha (160 acres).

== Geography ==
The Barrytown Flats are at 42º 10' S, 29 km (18 mi) north of Greymouth on the West Coast of the South Island, and immediately south of the pancake rocks of Dolomite Point, Punakaiki. They are 17 km (11 mi) in length north–south, up to 1.5 km (0.93 mi) wide east–west, bounded by the Tasman Sea to the west and the Paparoa Range to the east. The southern end of the flats is defined by the headland Seventeen Mile Bluff, and their northern end by Razorback Point and the mouth of the Punakaiki River.

This coastal plain is mostly below 10 metres (33 ft) in altitude, reaching 30 metres (98 ft) at points, and is crossed by numerous creeks and waterways, the most significant from south to north being Fagan Creek, Granite Creek (near Barrytown), Little Granite Creek, Canoe Creek (which roughly bisects the flats), Deverys Creek, Maher Creek, Waiwhero Creek, and Hibernia Creek (which flows into Nikau Scenic Reserve).

== Geology ==
The eastern boundary of the flats consists of former sea cliffs, and the flats themselves were formed after the end of the last glaciation from coastal progradation – the accumulation of sediment washed down from the hills. Gravel fans have been created by creeks, especially Granite Creek and Canoe Creek, and sandy sediment is constantly carried along the coast by wave action, creating an almost straight shoreline. The Barrytown sands contain gold, ilmenite, garnet, and zircon at sufficient levels to be of economic interest.

== Flora and fauna ==
The most significant remnant of the flats' original vegetation is Nikau Scenic Reserve, a 20 ha block stretching from the coast to the post-glacial cliff. The reserve is notable for containing a full sequence of coastal vegetation. Towards the hills it consists of forest dominated by northern rātā (Metrosideros robusta) and rimu (Dacrydium cupressinum), along with kamahi (Weinmannia racemosa), toro (Myrsine salicina), and nīkau (Rhopalostylis sapida). The sand-dune forest is mostly totara (Podocarpus laetus and P. totara). The younger coastal ridges contain totara, kōwhai (Sophora microphylla) and akeake (Olearia avicenniifolia), and on their seaward side gorse, flax (Phormium spp.) and Coprosma propinqua.

In 2008, 80 ha of Barrytown Flats land owned by Rio Tinto, previously earmarked for ilmenite mining, was designated Te Ara Taiko Nature reserve. A restoration project run by the Department of Conservation (DOC) and Conservation Volunteers New Zealand had planted 200,000 trees on the site by February 2020.

== History ==
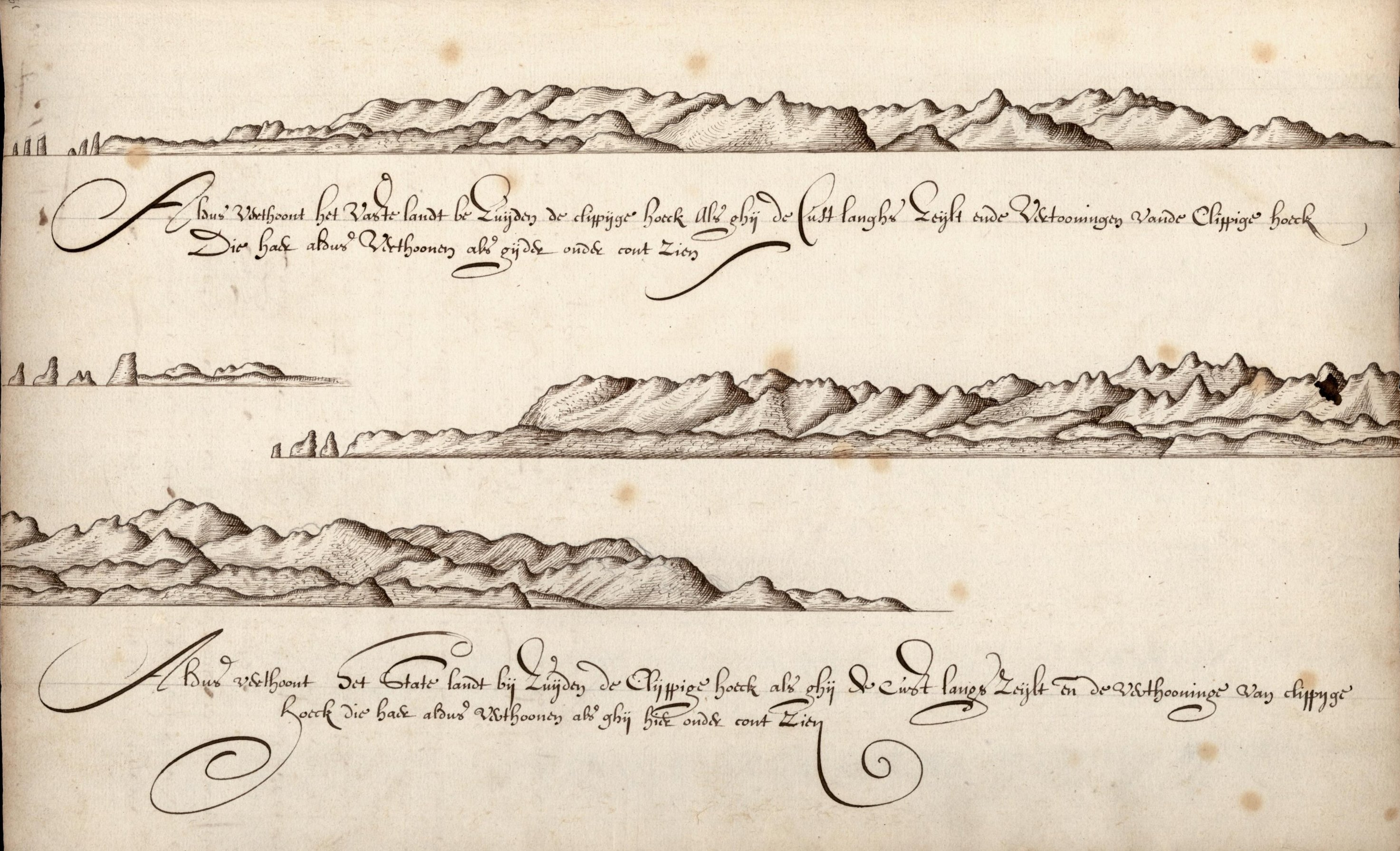
The coastline and Paparoa Range from Cape Foulwind to Punakaiki, sketched by Isaack Gilsemans in Abel Tasman's ship's journal, December 1642

The beach at Barrytown Flats was known to local Māori as Pakiroa, and was a significant food-gathering site. This area was the first part of New Zealand to be seen by Europeans, when Abel Tasman arrived in December 1642 off Punakaiki and headed north and east along the coast.

When early European explorer Charles Heaphy visited the area in 1846 he described it as an uninhabited strip of swampy flat land covered in rātā, flax, and bush.

The Barrytown Flats were first mined for gold in January 1867, the rush taking place in March in the area of Canoe Creek. Known officially as Pakington, the Canoe Creek diggings consisted of a series of tunnels into the river terraces. Initially profitable, the diggings attracted 1,500 miners by the end of March, dropping to 500 by May and just a few score by the end of 1867. Later gold dredging centred on the small settlement of Seventeen Mile Beach, later renamed Fosbery and in 1881 Barrytown, of which the "All Nations Hotel", a cemetery, and a few dozen houses remain.

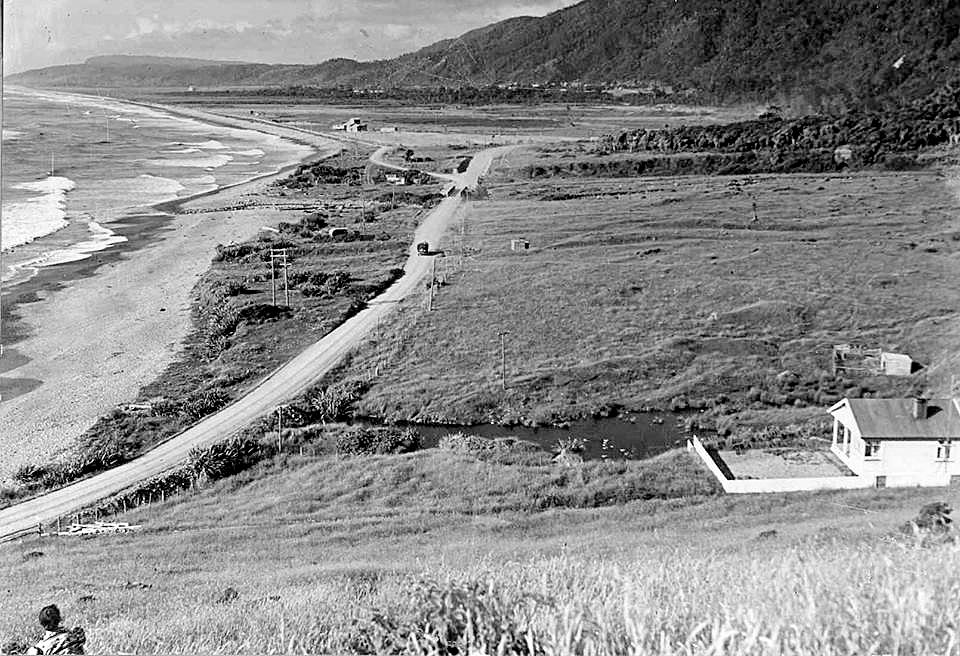
The Flats in the 1930s showing the old coastal road

Since that time the drier parts of the flats have been cleared of forest and drained by "humping and hollowing", creating pasture. Deep drains and straightening of streams were needed to "bring the land in". The trees on the coastal plain were too small and twisted for good timber, so podocarp forest in the hills was logged – these supplied planks for flumes, which carried water for gold sluicing.

More recent, economic activity has comprised possum trapping, deer farming, dairy, and plantations of Pinus radiata. The pure water source south of Barrytown near the coast led to experimental plantings of wasabi (Wasabia japonica) in the 1990s, and a herd of water buffalo was trialled.

== Mining ==
=== Gold ===
Gold was first extracted on the Barrytown Flats by small-scale "black-sanding", passing the sand through a sluice box and allowing the gold to settle. Later, in the 1880s and 1900s, water was carried from Canoe Creek to the coast by wooden water races and a 3 1/2 mile pipe and used to sluice the lagoon for gold. Later mining used gold dredges, floating motorised structures which processed large quantities of sand and left rows of tailings.

Gold dredging was conducted from the 1930s up to 1948 by a succession of companies: NZ Gold Options (1931–32), NZ Prospecting and Mining Ltd (1935–37), Whites Electric Dredging Company (1936–41), and Barrytown Dredging Company Ltd (1947–45).

=== Mineral sands ===
From 1966 interest turned to ilmenite, a mineral containing titanium dioxide, used in the production of white paint. The estimated 6.9 megatonnes of ilmenite at Barrytown is the largest deposit in New Zealand, although the titanium dioxide content is low by world standards. Exploration and mining proposals were put forward by various companies including North Broken Hill Peko Ltd (North Ltd from 1994). In August 2000 Rio Tinto Ltd acquired North Ltd, the company Westland Ilmenite Ltd, and the Barrytown project. Rio Tinto intended to mine ilmenite, and built a four-storey plant north of Barrytown, but decided the project was uneconomic and put the project into 'care and maintenance' mode in 1994. The land was officially gifted to the Punakaiki Coastal Restoration Project in 2010.

In 2021 Australian-owned Barrytown Joint Ventures Ltd applied for consents to mine ilmenite, gold, and garnet on 115 ha of private land between Canoe Creek and Deverys Creek. Over 15 years up to 156,000 tonnes of sand per year—5,000 tonnes per week—would be extracted to a depth of 10–15 m, 24 hours a day, and processed on site, with up to 200 truckloads per week of ore being transported to Westport or Greymouth for export. Although the public were excluded from making a submission, with only a handful of "affected parties" allowed to respond, all but one of the submissions (from Fish and Game, DOC, neighbours, and Ngāti Waewae) opposed the proposed mine; Ngāti Waewae later withdrew their objection. Locals had expressed concerns about noise, light pollution, heavy vehicle traffic, and the endangered Westland petrel (tāiko) being at risk because of attraction to lights. In February 2022, the Grey District Council and the West Coast Regional Council declined the application, citing environmental concerns, including the potential effects on sensitive waterways and the risks to tāiko from vehicle activity and lights associated with the mining project.

Barrytown JV Ltd then changed its name to TiGa Minerals and Metals and in January 2023 announced they would be lodging a new but largely unchanged application, stating that the mine would have no impact on flora, fauna, or the water table. The company applied for resource consents in April, claiming that when the mine was in full operation there would be $63m in export revenue, and up to $34 million in wages and local expenditure annually. The resource consent process was expected to take 6 months, with production commencing by early 2025. In October 2024, consents for the mining operation were granted, following the resolution of an appeal. The consents allow for mining for a 12 year period and the extraction of 4.8 million tonnes of mineral sands over an area of 63 ha (160 acres). In full production, the mining operation will result in an average of 50 trucks per day travelling between the site and either Greymouth or Westport.

In 2025, the Grey District Council issued a consent for a minerals processing plant for the project to be established at Rapahoe, a coastal settlement around 13 km (8.1 mi) by road north of Greymouth. The processing plant would be established on a 4.3 ha (11 acres) site next to the Rapahoe Branch railway line and State Highway 6, around 1 km (0.62 mi) from Rapahoe. A geochemist based at Lawrence Livermore National Laboratory, John Bradley, raised concerns that the separation of the minerals in the processing plant will concentrate radioactive materials from the sands, and lead to radiation levels that exceed the legal limit. Bradley drew particular attention to the hazards of radon gas emissions from the minerals. In October, the mining company changed its name to Tāiko Critical Minerals Limited.
