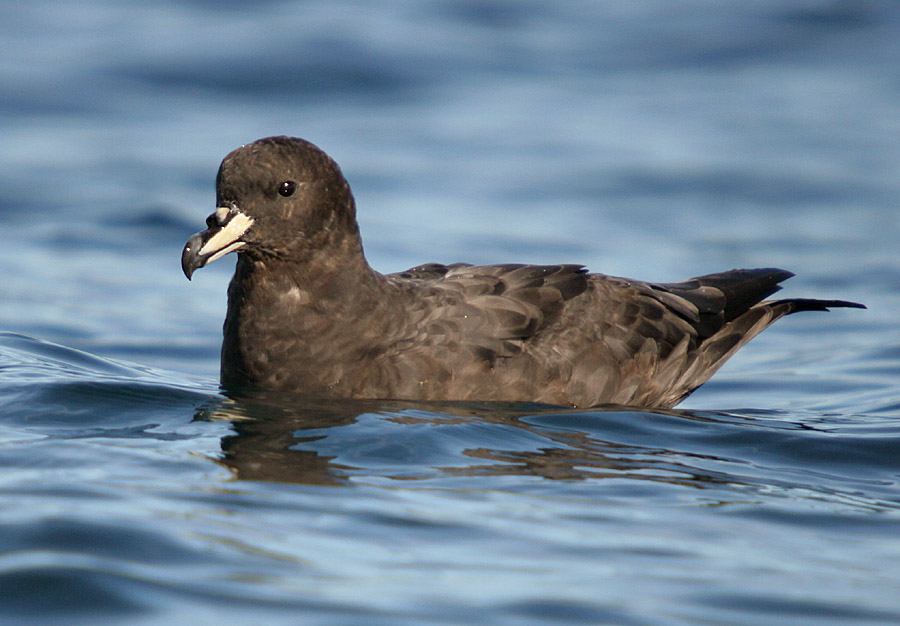

Conservation status
- Endangered (IUCN 3.1)

- Naturally Uncommon (NZ TCS)

Scientific classification
- Kingdom: Animalia
- Phylum: Chordata
- Class: Aves
- Order: Procellariiformes
- Family: Procellariidae
- Genus: Procellaria
- Species: P. westlandica

Binomial name
- Procellaria westlandica Falla, 1946
- Westland petrel range

Synonyms
- Procellana parkinsoni westlandica Falla, 1946

= Westland petrel =

Species of bird

The Westland petrel (Procellaria westlandica), (Māori: tāiko), also known as the Westland black petrel, is a moderately large seabird in the petrel family Procellariidae, that is endemic to New Zealand. Described by Robert Falla in 1946, it is a stocky bird weighing approximately 1,100 grams (39 oz), and is one of the largest of the burrowing petrels. It is a dark blackish-brown colour with black legs and feet. It has a pale yellow bill with a dark tip.

This species spends most of its life at sea but returns to land to breed. When at sea, it ranges across areas of the Pacific and Tasman seas around the subtropical convergence and migrates east to South American waters during the non-breeding season. They feed on fish, squid and crustaceans. This species is also known to be an opportunistic feeder, scavenging fish waste discarded by hoki fishers.

The only known breeding colonies of the Westland petrel are in New Zealand, in a small area of forest-covered coastal foothills between Barrytown and Punakaiki on the South Island's West Coast. The birds nest in burrows excavated into hillsides and slopes, and exhibit natal philopatry, that is they return to their natal colony to breed. The loss of a breeding colony can therefore have severe consequences for the population. The total area of all breeding colonies combined is only about 16 hectares (40 acres). In 2014, the breeding colony areas suffered extensive damage from landslips and tree fall during the tail-end of Cyclone Ita. Other significant potential threats to the breeding colonies are predation by feral pigs and vagrant dogs from nearby settlements.

As of 2021, the International Union for Conservation of Nature classified this species as endangered, and the New Zealand Department of Conservation classified this species as "At Risk: Naturally Uncommon" under the New Zealand Threat Classification System.

== Taxonomy ==
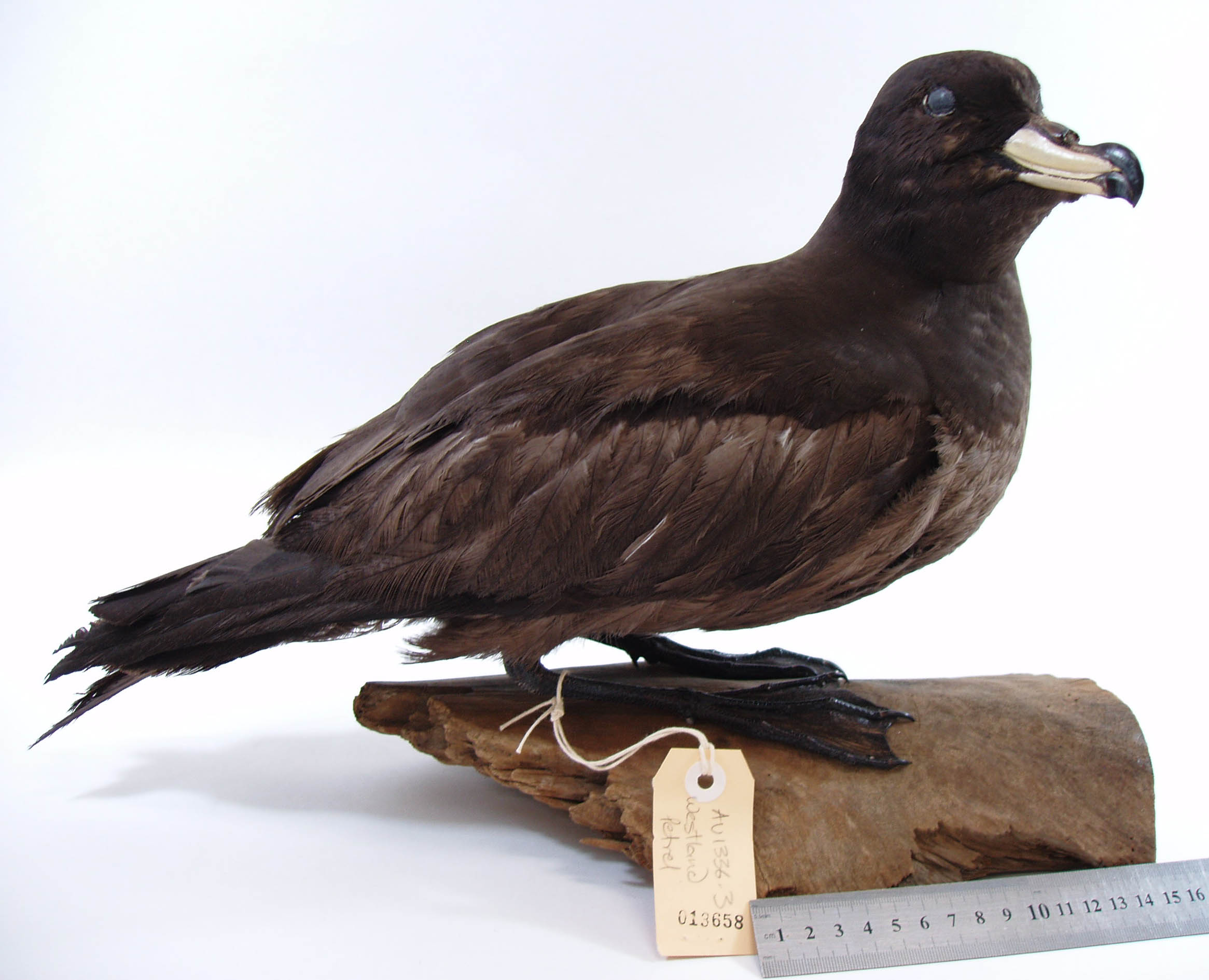
Westland petrel specimen

The Westland petrel was first described by New Zealand ornithologist Robert Falla in 1946 under the name Procellana parkinsoni westlandica. The Westland petrel was identified in 1945 after the students of Barrytown School wrote to Falla, as he was then the director of the Canterbury Museum. They had heard in a radio broadcast about the sooty shearwater/muttonbird, but noticed that the behaviour of the 'mutton birds' in their area was quite different. They also sent Falla a dead bird, and within a few weeks he visited the West Coast. Initially he considered that the West Coast birds were a subspecies of the black petrel (Procellaria parkinsoni), but it was soon classified as a separate species. The male holotype specimen, collected at Barrytown on 29 April 1946, is held at the Canterbury Museum.

The Māori name is tāiko, which also refers to the black petrel, Procellaria parkinsoni.

== Description ==
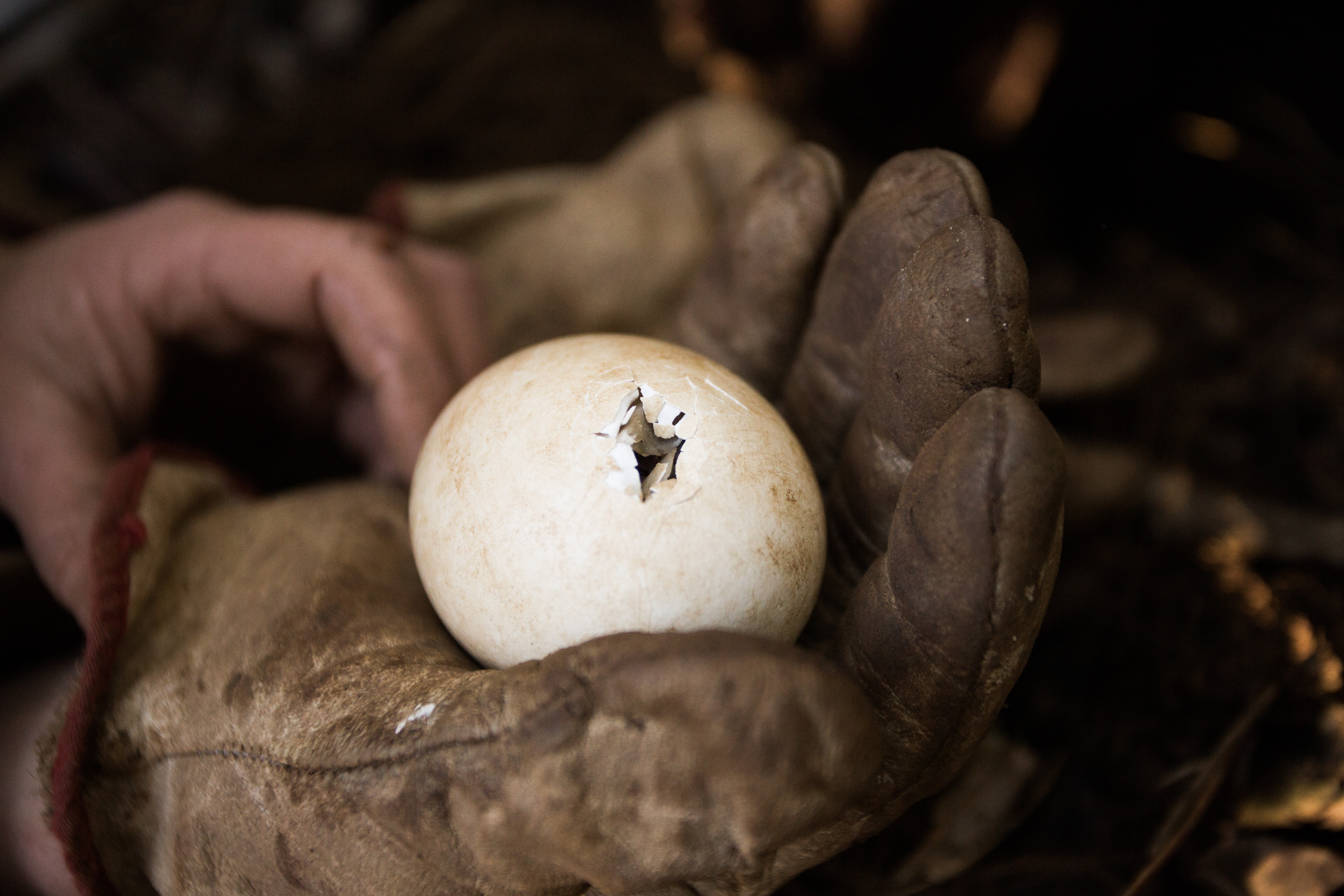
Westland petrel egg

The adult Westland petrel is a stocky bird, weighing around 1,100 grams (39 oz). It is entirely dark blackish-brown, with black legs and feet. Some individuals may have a few white feathers. The bill is pale yellow with a dark tip. Falla measured the female and male birds for his original description and pointed out that the male of the species measured slightly larger than the female. However the female specimen weighed slightly more than the male. It is one of the largest of the burrowing petrels.

Falla described the eggs of this species as follows:

These were white, smooth, without gloss and generally similar to the eggs of most other petrels. They vary in shape from elongate pyriform to ovate. The average weight of the entire egg when fresh is about 4 oz.

Moulting occurs in the Westland petrel in their non-breeding season between October and February, during migration to South America. The immature birds moult before older individuals do.

== Distribution and habitat ==
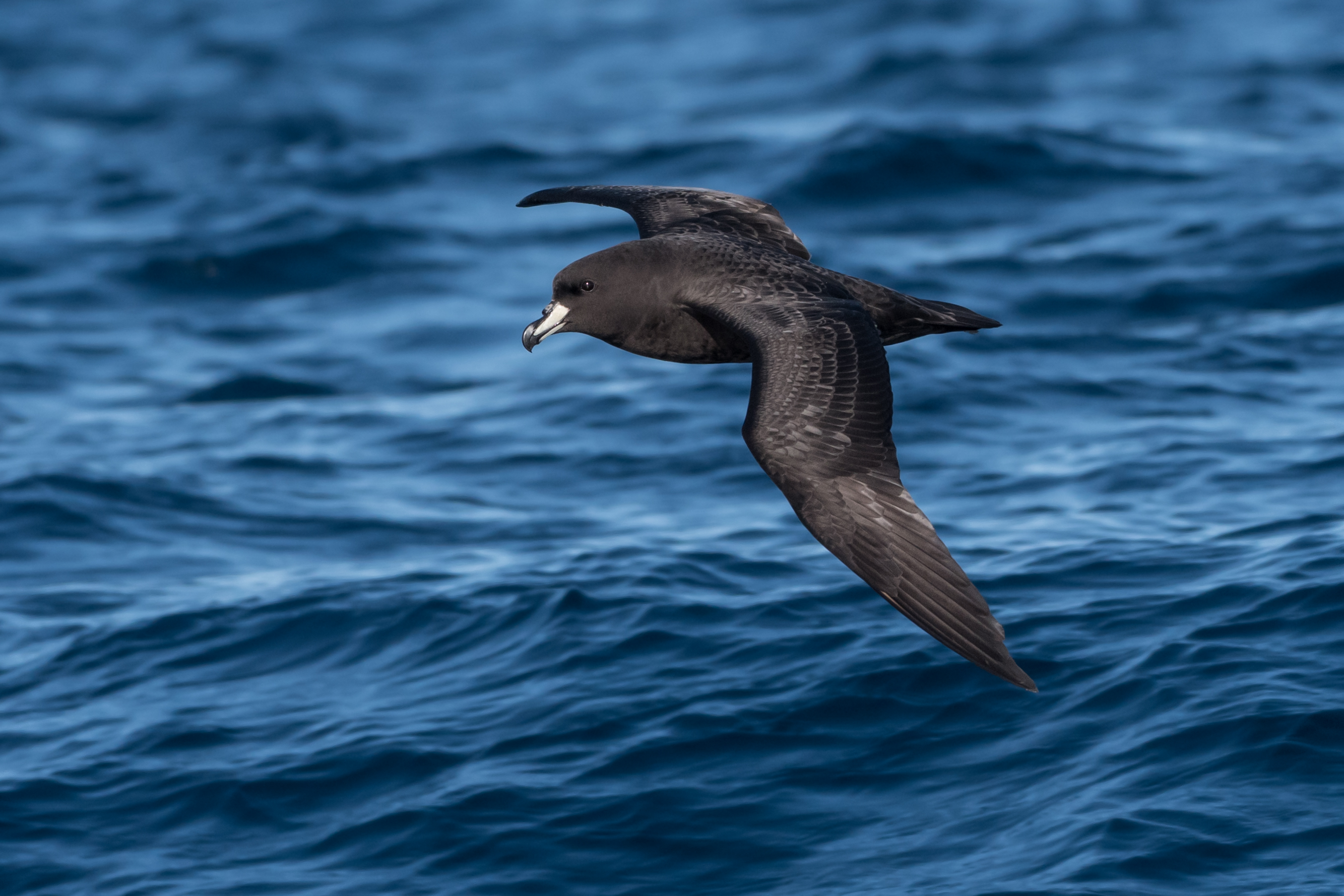
Westland petrel in flight

The Westland petrel is endemic to New Zealand. It spends most of its life at sea, only returning to land to breed, and breeds only in a small region of the South Island's West Coast. The breeding range covers an 8 km (5.0 mi) wide strip between Barrytown and Punakaiki, specifically from the Punakaiki River to Waiwhero (Lawson) Creek. The area of the breeding colonies comprises forest-covered coastal foothills within the Paparoa National Park, or other conservation land, or on land belonging to Forest And Bird. There is also a breeding colony located on private land. The total area of all breeding colonies combined is only about 16 hectares (40 acres).

During the breeding season, adults may be seen in waters around New Zealand from Cape Egmont to Fiordland in the west, through the Cook Strait, and from East Cape to Banks Peninsula in the east. Westland petrels also range across areas of the Pacific Ocean and Tasman Sea around the subtropical convergence. In the non-breeding season, the birds migrate east to waters off South America and feed in the Humboldt Current. They are often found in waters to the west of the Chilean coast. Individuals usually remain solitary during this time, rejoining the colony when the next breeding cycle begins.

== Breeding and life-cycle ==
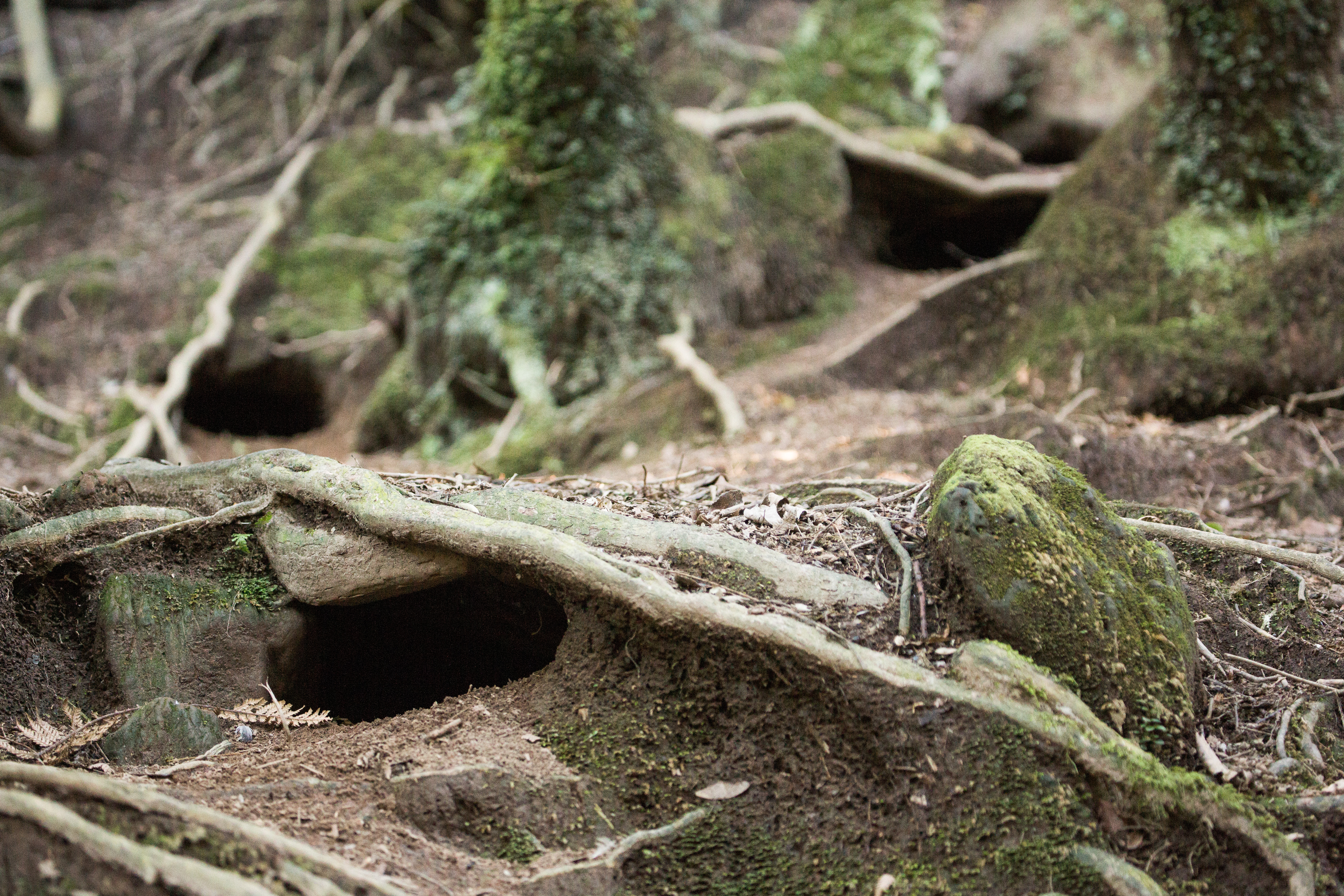
Western petrel burrows.

The Westland petrel is one of the few petrel species that still nest on the mainland. Their large size and aggressive behaviour have helped to ensure that they can resist predators that would attack smaller species. Westland petrels nest in burrows dug 1 to 2 metres into the hillside, often on a steep slope. There are around 29 colonies of petrel in the breeding territory. Each colony has between 50 and 1000 burrows. Colonies can be located anywhere from 50 to 200 metres (160 to 660 ft) above sea level.

Westland petrel are winter breeders, arriving at their breeding grounds annually in late March or early April to prepare their burrows for nesting. Colonies are noted to be very vocal around three weeks before nesting, during the time when courtship and mating occur. Petrels can form life time pair-bonds. The female lays a single egg between May and June that hatches two months later, between August and September. Both the male and female taking turns incubating the egg. After hatching, the parents care for the chick for about two weeks. After this time the chick is left alone, but is fed at night. If either parent dies before the chick is nearly ready for fledging, the chick will not survive. Fledging occurs between 120 and 130 days after hatching. Fledging begins in early November, with a peak around 20 November, and finishes in mid-January. In total, chick rearing takes between 177 and 198 days (approximately 6 to 6.5 months). After leaving the nesting sites, fledglings may not return for up to 10 years.

== Diet and foraging ==
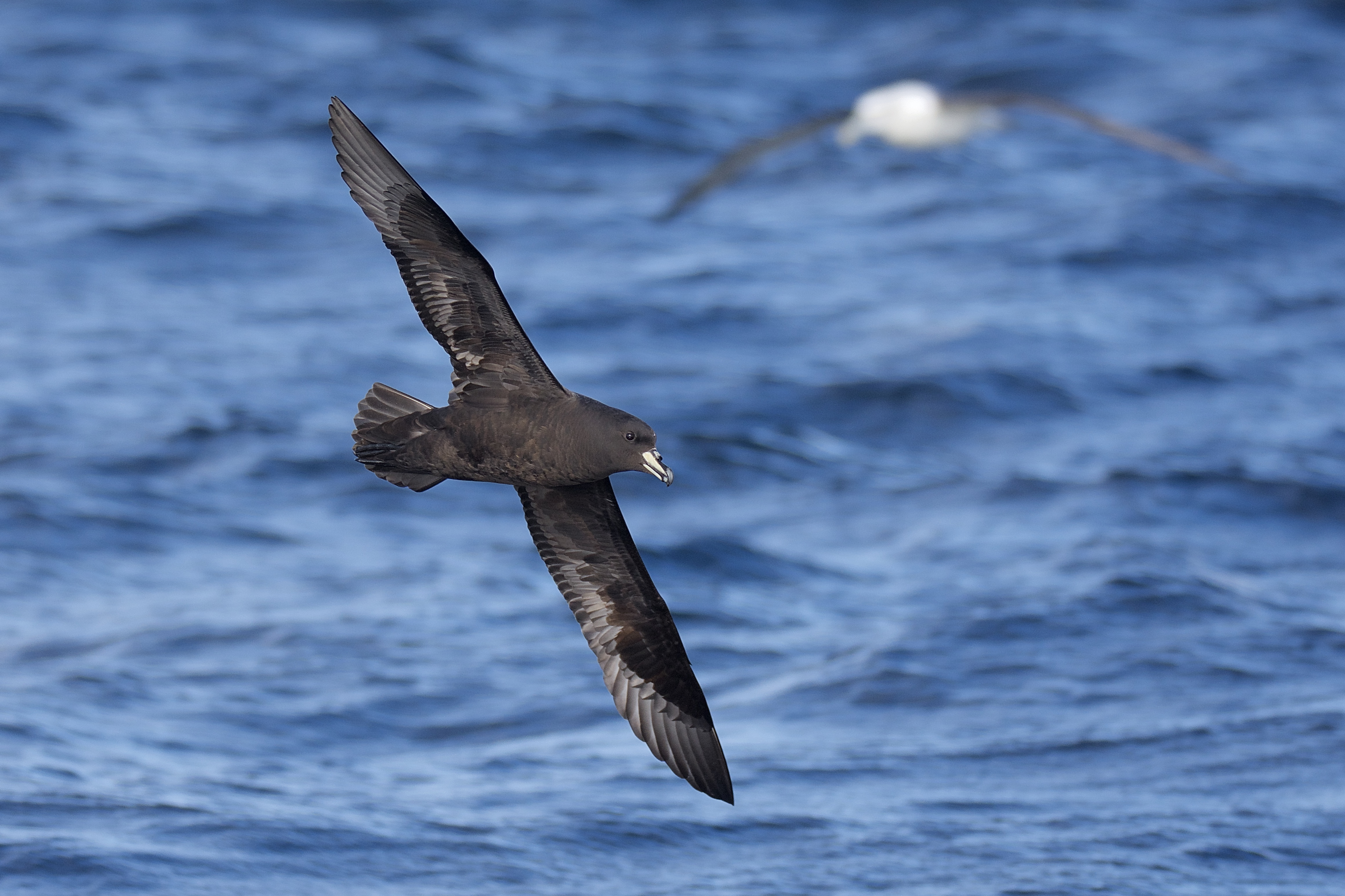
Westland petrel hunting

Westland petrels can forage during both day and night, preying primarily on fish, some squid, and less commonly on crustaceans. They are known to opportunistically scavenge fish from waste discarded by hoki fisheries during their breeding season as it overlaps with the fishing season, switching back to natural foraging at other times. They capture their prey by seizing or diving from the surface, and, less frequently, pursuit plunging. They have been recorded diving to depths of 8 metres (26 ft). Their strong vision allows them to spot prey, and recent studies have shown that smell is also important to petrel foraging, specific odours seeming to attract the birds to certain areas.

== Threats ==
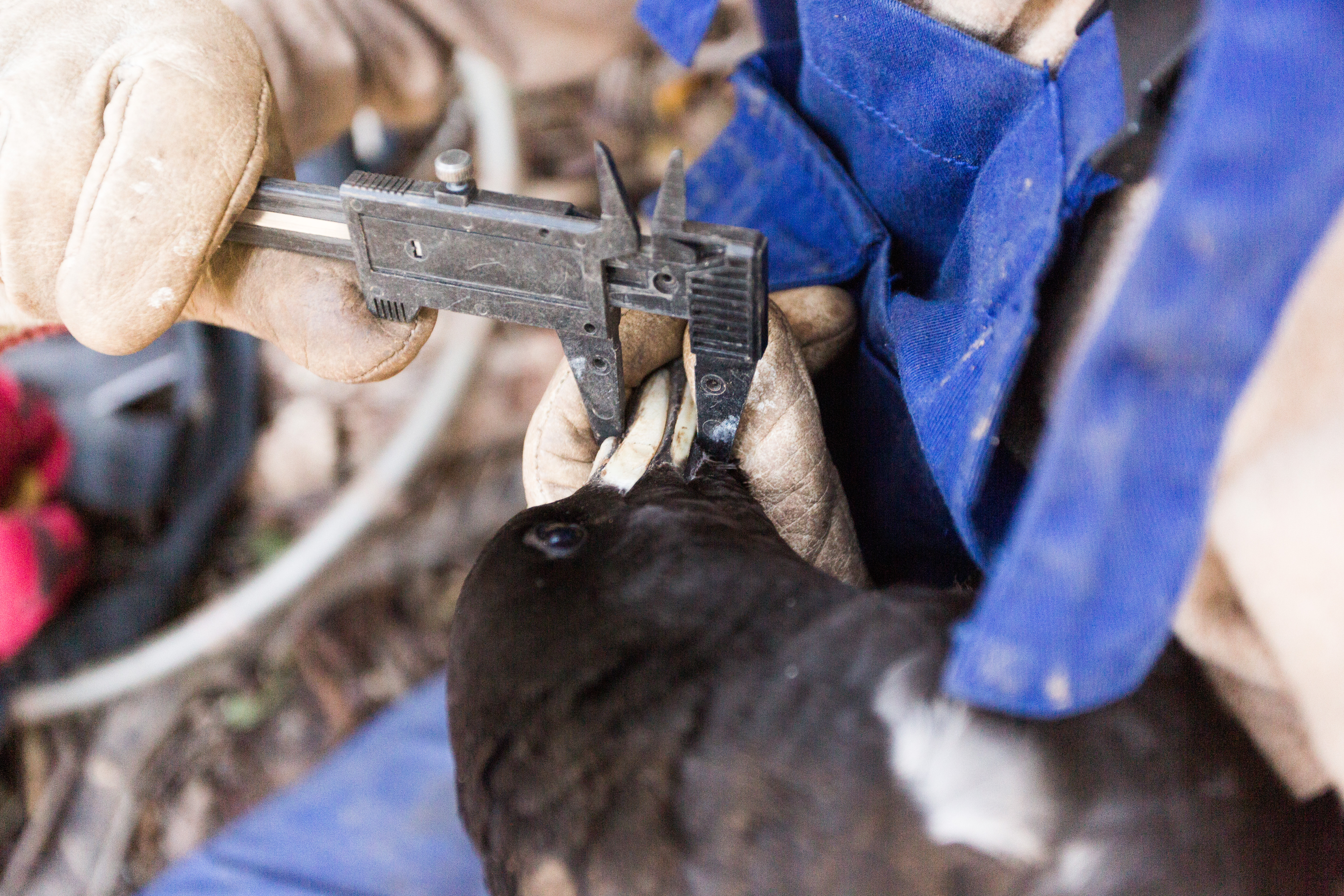
Measuring a Westland Petrel.

=== Breeding colony hazards ===
Westland petrels, along with other types of seabird exhibit natal philopatry—they return to their natal colony to breed. This means that the loss of a breeding colony through landslides, predation or human interference can have severe consequences for the population.

==== Storm, landslide and tree fall ====
The breeding colonies are often on steep sites, and are vulnerable to damage resulting from landslips and tree fall. In April 2014, Cyclone Ita brought very strong winds to the West Coast along with heavy rain. The storm caused widespread damage across the area of the breeding colonies, although not all colonies were equally affected. After the storm, a survey was conducted at colony locations containing 75% of the estimated breeding population. In 4 out of the 6 colonies surveyed, over half of the breeding habitat had been lost through landslips and fallen trees.

Further damage to nesting areas occurred during Cyclone Fehi and Cyclone Gita in 2018.

==== Predation ====
Predation by feral pigs and vagrant dogs are among the top threats to Westland petrels at the breeding colonies. Pigs are a particularly serious threat because they can potentially destroy an entire nesting colony. There have been reports that hunters have deliberately released pigs in areas close to the colonies. Wandering dogs are also a significant threat, because the settlement of Punakaiki is only 2.5 km (1.6 mi) from the colonies.

Other predators such as stoats, and rats and weka may strike during the breeding season when the birds are on land, preying on chicks in burrows and on adult birds. Feral cats are also infrequent predators of petrels. While not predators, concerns have been raised about the threat of burrow destruction by cattle and goats. They can trample burrows and allow access to predators such as weka, that would have been unable to reach them otherwise.

=== Artificial lighting ===
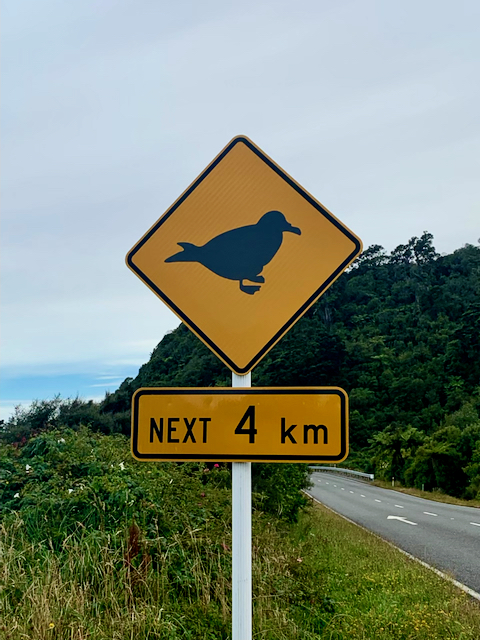
Sign near Punakaiki warning drivers about Westland petrels on the road

Many types of seabirds are vulnerable to injury and death as a result of being attracted to artificial lights at night. This is a particular threat for petrels and shearwaters. Burrow-nesting seabirds like the Westland petrel returning to their burrows at night, or leaving them before dawn, can become disoriented by artificial lights and crash land on roads. They are often unable to take off again. The birds can then be eaten by predators or struck by vehicles. In 2009, the Department of Conservation asked residents of Punakaiki to help reduce the occurrences of fledgling birds crash landing in the town by turning off outside lights and closing blinds at night, particularly during misty or stormy weather.

In 2020, the NZ Transport Agency (Waka Kotahi), in what was reported as a nationwide-first, turned off streetlights on State Highway 6 in Punakaiki between November and January, the period when the fledgling birds leave their burrows and take their first flight. Shortly after the start of this conservation initiative, Westland petrels were found crash-landed in Greymouth, in larger numbers than reported in previous years. A recent switch to LED streetlights in Greymouth was suggested as a possible cause of the increase. In 2021, it was reported that the number of birds crashing in Punakaiki had reduced significantly in response to the reduced lighting in the town, and the streetlights were again switched off during the next petrel fledging season.

=== Mining on Barrytown Flats ===
In 2021, Australian-owned Barrytown Joint Ventures Ltd applied for consents to mine ilmenite sands on 114 hectares (280 acres) of private land on the Barrytown Flats between Canoe Creek and Deverys Creek. Over eight years up to 156,000 tonnes of sand per year would be extracted to a depth of 10–15 m (33–49 ft), 24 hours a day, and processed on site, with the ore being transported to Westport or Greymouth for export. Locals had expressed concerns about noise, light pollution, heavy vehicle traffic, and Westland petrels being attracted to lights. In February 2022, the Grey District Council and the West Coast Regional Council declined an application to mine 5,000 tonnes of ilmenite sands per week, citing environmental concerns, including the potential effects on sensitive waterways and the risks to Westland petrels from vehicle activity and lights associated with the mining project. In October 2024, consents for the mining operation were granted, following the resolution of an appeal. The consents allow for mining for a 12 year period and the extraction of 4.8 million tonnes of mineral sands over an area of 63 ha (160 acres). In full production, the mining operation will result in an average of 50 trucks per day travelling between the site and either Greymouth or Westport.

=== Parasites and diseases ===
No diseases have been recorded to date that are significant for the Westland petrel. However, little research has been done on disease and parasites in New Zealand seabirds. Avian pox may potentially pose a threat to the petrels, as it has killed a number of black petrel chicks. Other diseases that affect seabirds include avian malaria, avian cholera, and avian diphtheria but these have not been observed in Westland petrels to date.

=== Other threats ===
Power lines have caused the deaths of adult petrels from collision during flight. Commercial fishing is another source of threat because petrels are sometimes accidentally captured in fishing nets. This is a significant risk for Westland petrels, as they are known to interact closely with the fishing vessels and forage from fishery waste.

== Conservation ==
As of 2021, this species is regarded as being endangered under the International Union for Conservation of Nature Red List of Threatened Species. The Department of Conservation assessed its conservation status in 2021 as "At Risk: Naturally Uncommon" under the New Zealand Threat Classification System.

Petrel Patrol

During the fledging season, November to January, a team of local conservationists patrol an 8 km (5.0 mi) section State Highway 6 in the Barrytown Flats area that lies beneath the flight path from the breeding colonies, looking for birds that have crash-landed on or near the road, having been distracted by the lights of vehicles. Any birds that are found are placed in a box and delivered to the Department of Conservation (DOC) office in Punakaiki. The patrol continues in the mornings along the beach. Each bird gets a check-up, and is then released by specialists from DOC or the Westland Petrel Trust.

== Relationship with humans ==
=== Tāiko festival ===
For several years until 2022, a festival was held in Punakaiki to celebrate the return of the petrel to its only known breeding sites, close to the town. It was a weekend-long festival in April or May that included live music, various entertainment activities, and a local market. The festival began with a viewing of the birds as they rafted up out at sea then flew overhead and made their way to their nests in the steep forest clad coastal hills at dusk. Seabird ecologist, the late Kerry-Jayne Wilson MNZM led the viewing, explaining the ecology of the birds.

=== Ecotourism ===
There is an ecotourism business in the area that provides viewing opportunities at the breeding colony located on private land.

=== Harvesting of chicks ===
Westland petrel chicks have historically been harvested for food in a practice known as muttonbirding, although this is not thought to be part of traditional Māori food gathering practice in this area.
