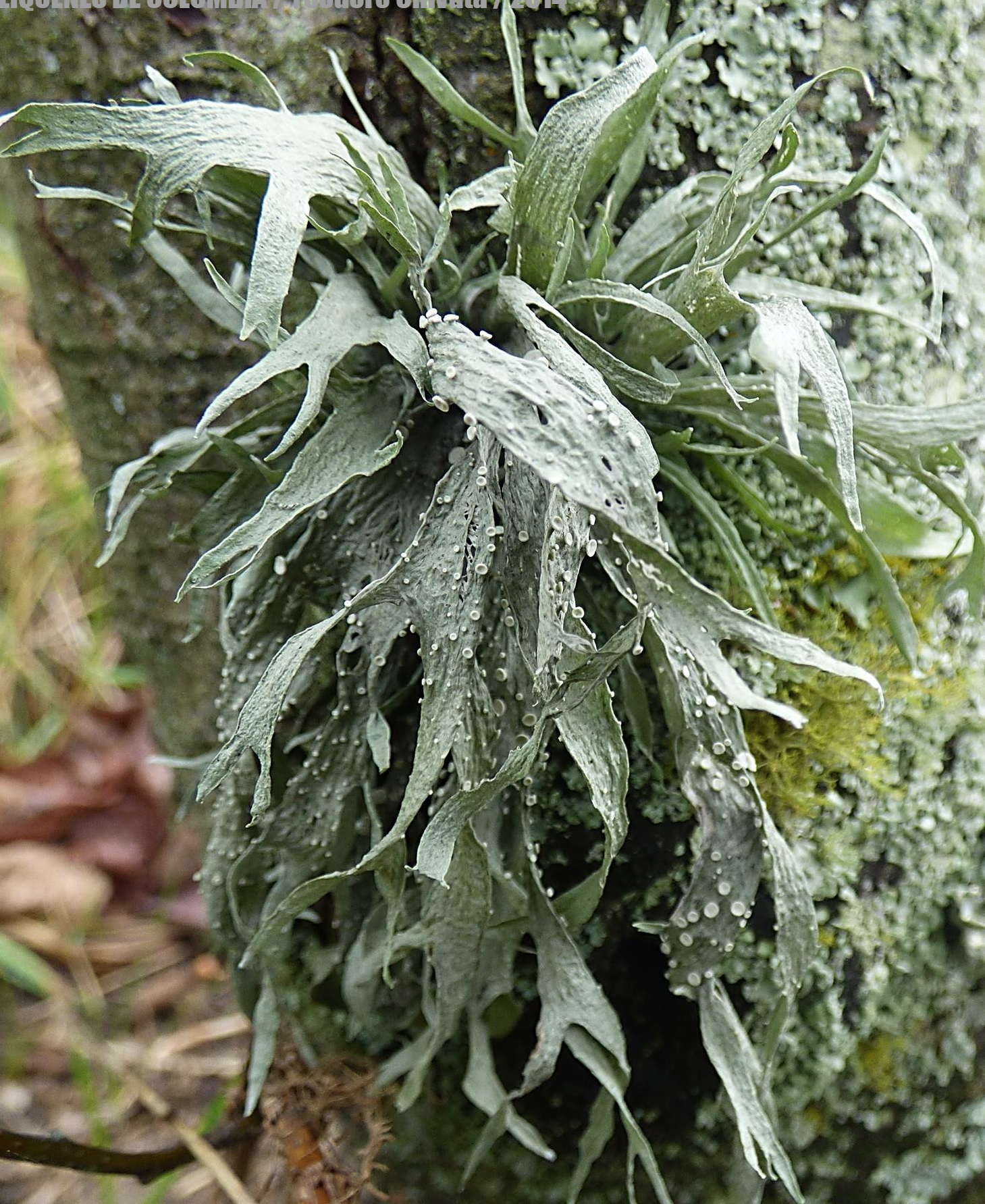

Conservation status
- Secure (NatureServe)

Scientific classification
- Kingdom: Fungi
- Division: Ascomycota
- Class: Lecanoromycetes
- Order: Lecanorales
- Family: Ramalinaceae
- Genus: Ramalina
- Species: R. celastri

Binomial name
- Ramalina celastri (Spreng.) Krog & Swinscow (1976)

Synonyms
- List: Parmelia celastri Spreng. (1827); Lichen linearis Sw. (1781); Lobaria linearis (Sw.) Raeusch. (1797); Parmelia linearis (Sw.) Ach. (1803); Ramalina linearis (Sw.) Ach. (1810); Ramalina calicaris f. linearis (Sw.) Nyl. (1860); Ramalina canaliculata subsp. linearis (Sw.) Nyl. (1870); Sticta ecklonii Spreng. (1827); Ramalina fraxinea var. membranacea Laurer (1827); Ramalina calicaris var. membranacea (Laurer) C.Bab. (1855); Ramalina yemensis f. membranacea (Laurer) Nyl. (1870); Ramalina yemensis var. membranacea (Laurer) Nyl. (1870); Ramalina ecklonii var. membranacea (Laurer) Müll.Arg. (1894); Ramalina ecklonii var. tenuissima Meyen & Flot. (1843); Ramalina lanceolata var. tenuissima (Meyen & Flot.) Müll.Arg. (1883); Ramalina yemensis var. tenuissima (Meyen & Flot.) Zahlbr. (1930); Evernia flavicans f. tenuissima Meyen & Flot. (1843); Ramalina calicaris var. ovalis (Hook.f. & Taylor) Bab. (1860); Ramalina yemensis subsp. ovalis (Hook.f. & Taylor) Nyl. (1870); Ramalina ecklonii var. ovalis (Hook.f. & Taylor) F.Wilson (1893); Ramalina yemensis var. ovalis (Hook.f. & Taylor) Zahlbr. (1930); Ramalina celastri subsp. ovalis (Hook.f. & Taylor) G.N.Stevens (1987); Teloschistes flavicans var. tenuissimus Meyen & Flot. ex Müll.Arg. (1883)

= Ramalina celastri =

Species of lichen-forming fungus

Ramalina celastri is a species of corticolous and lignicolous (bark- and wood-dwelling), fruticose lichen in the family Ramalinaceae. It is a widespread species with a pantropical distribution.

== Taxonomy ==
The lichen was formally described as a new species in 1827 by Kurt Polycarp Joachim Sprengel, as Parmelia celastri. The type specimen was collected by Christian Friedrich Ecklon in South Africa. Sprengel's species diagnosis outlined several key features of the lichen, including its growth form (tufted, erect, branched), colouration (pale yellowish), the nature of its branchlets (shortened, capillary-like), and details about its reproductive structures (somewhat flat, yellow scutellae with paler margins). It also specifies the habitat or substrate preference as growing on the branches of Celastrus pyracantha, to which the species epithet of the lichen alludes. The species was transferred to the genus Ramalina by Hildur Krog and Thomas Douglas Victor Swinscow in 1976.

Ramalina ovalis is sometimes given as a synonym of Ramalina celastri, but molecular data strongly support its distinction as a unique species.

In North America, a vernacular name used for the species is "palmetto lichen". This refers to the divergence of the branches from a single point, similar to a palmetto leaf. In New Zealand, a common vernacular name is "cartilage lichen".

== Description ==
Ramalina celastri typically forms a corticolous (growing on the bark of trees) thallus, which is the main body of the lichen, characterised by its rigid, erect to somewhat pendulous (hanging) structure that can reach up to 15 cm in length. The thallus emerges from an often broad base and has sparing to moderate branching. The branches have a colour ranging from straw-colored to pale green. These branches are solid and flattened, with a lanceolate (lance-shaped) form that can be either plane (flat) or slightly canaliculate (channelled). The width of these branches is quite variable, ranging from 1 to 20 mm, though they most commonly measure between 3 and 5 mm. Young branches are thin and more or less smooth, transitioning as they age to develop longitudinal or reticulately (net-like) ridged surfaces. These textures result from strands of cartilaginous tissue, and the branches often have holes or cracks. Short linear or irregular laminal pseudocyphellae (small pores in the thallus that allow for gas exchange), are commonly present but soralia, which are structures for asexual reproduction, are absent.

Reproductive features of Ramalina celastri include numerous apothecia (fruiting bodies). These are predominantly found lateral and laminal (along the surface) on the thallus and are supported by a stipe (stalk). The disc of the apothecia may be flat or convex, surrounded by a smooth thalline exciple, which is the rim of tissue around the disc. The spores measure 4–7 by 11–16 μm. Ramalina celastri lacks any medullary substances as confirmed by thin-layer chromatography. The only secondary metabolite (lichen product) it contains reliably is usnic acid; atranorin is an accessory substance, meaning that it is sometimes present, sometimes not present.

== Use as a biomonitor ==
In Argentina, Ramalina celastri has been used in passive biomonitoring studies as a bioaccumulator of atmospheric deposition. These studies have associated high zinc content in the thallus with high levels of motor vehicle traffic and industrial and agricultural activity.

== Habitat and distribution ==
Ramalina celastri is widely distributed in tropical areas of the world. It grows on bark and on wood, and is found on trees, shrubs, and wooden posts, it has also been noted to occasionally grows on rocks. It is typically found in the warmer and more humid regions of Australia, specifically in New South Wales and Queensland, as well as in northern New Zealand. In New Zealand, the rock-dwelling forms of Ramalina celastri on the North Island, found exclusively within coastal environments, showed distinct morphological differences from their tree-dwelling counterparts, characterised by a more robust structure with wider and longer thalli. Additionally, in cross-section, the medulla of saxicolous specimens was found to be thicker. In East Africa, the lichen is common and widespread at elevations between 800 and 3,400 m (2,600 and 11,200 ft). It is less common in Brazil than in other tropical countries. Ramalina celastri has also been recorded from India. Its range in North America extends north to southern Texas.

== See also ==
- List of Ramalina species
