= Barrytown =

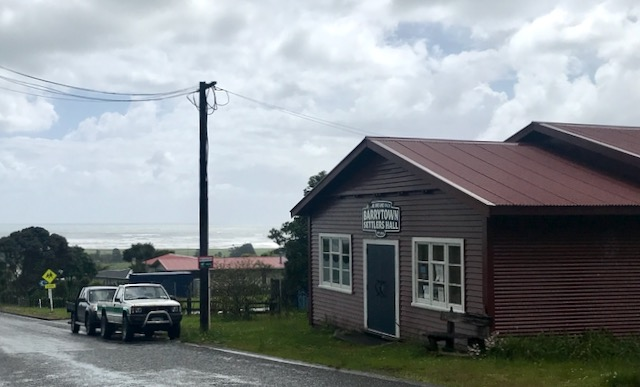
- Barrytown Hall
- Interactive map of Barrytown
- Coordinates: 42°14′38″S 171°19′35″E
- Country: New Zealand
- Region: West Coast
- District: Grey District
- Ward: Northern
- Electorates: West Coast-Tasman; Te Tai Tonga

Government
  - Territorial Authority: Grey District Council
  - Regional council: West Coast Regional Council
  - Mayor of Grey: Tania Gibson
  - West Coast-Tasman MP: Maureen Pugh
  - Te Tai Tonga MP: Tākuta Ferris

Area
  - Total: 30.27 km^{2} (11.69 sq mi)

Population (2023 Census)
  - Total: 207
  - Density: 6.84/km^{2} (17.7/sq mi)
- Local iwi: Ngāi Tahu

Barrytown (originally known as Seventeen Mile Beach and Fosbery) is a town in the West Coast region of New Zealand's South Island. Barrytown sits on State Highway 6 and is 21 kilometres (13 mi) north of Runanga, on the Barrytown Flats. Punakaiki is 16 kilometres (10 mi) further north. The town is near the southern end of Pakiroa Beach. The Māori name for the region is Paparoa.

== History ==
The land is originally Māori, and the local hapū is Ngāti Waewae of the iwi Ngāi Tahu. Pakiroa Beach along the Barrytown Flats was an important food source for local Māori, and middens of tuatua shells attributed to the iwi Waitaha have been dated to 1500 AD.

A gold rush in the 1860s led to workings at Seventeen Mile Beach and Canoe Creek, and by 1879 about 2000 miners were living in the area. In 1880 the township serving the miners was officially named "Fosebery" and a post office opened. The following year, however, a government opinion poll of residents and miners was held to choose between Fosbery and Barrytown. The 130 votes were unanimous for Barrytown.

By 1895, Barrytown had a Catholic church, a state school, two lodging-houses (Luis's and Cargill's), a smithy, and the All Nations Hotel. The two general stores, one including a butchery and bakery, were established in 1870 and 1879. The post office dispatched mail twice a week. By 1901 the population had dropped to 64, with an additional 60 people in the surrounding area.

== Demographics ==
Barrytown locality covers 30.27 km^{2} (11.69 sq mi). It is part of the larger Barrytown statistical area.

Historical population for Barrytown and surrounds
Year	Pop.	±% p.a.
2006	132	—
2013	156	+2.42%
2018	186	+3.58%
2023	207	+2.16%

Barrytown had a population of 207 in the 2023 New Zealand census, an increase of 21 people (11.3%) since the 2018 census, and an increase of 51 people (32.7%) since the 2013 census. There were 108 males and 99 females in 99 dwellings. 4.3% of people identified as LGBTIQ+. The median age was 50.2 years (compared with 38.1 years nationally). There were 36 people (17.4%) aged under 15 years, 18 (8.7%) aged 15 to 29, 120 (58.0%) aged 30 to 64, and 33 (15.9%) aged 65 or older.

People could identify as more than one ethnicity. The results were 91.3% European (Pākehā), 14.5% Māori, 1.4% Asian, and 8.7% other, which includes people giving their ethnicity as "New Zealander". English was spoken by 98.6%, Māori by 2.9%, and other languages by 10.1%. No language could be spoken by 1.4% (e.g. too young to talk). New Zealand Sign Language was known by 1.4%. The percentage of people born overseas was 15.9, compared with 28.8% nationally.

Religious affiliations were 15.9% Christian, 1.4% New Age, and 2.9% other religions. People who answered that they had no religion were 72.5%, and 7.2% of people did not answer the census question.

Of those at least 15 years old, 27 (15.8%) people had a bachelor's or higher degree, 93 (54.4%) had a post-high school certificate or diploma, and 45 (26.3%) people exclusively held high school qualifications. The median income was $27,600, compared with $41,500 nationally. 6 people (3.5%) earned over $100,000 compared to 12.1% nationally. The employment status of those at least 15 was 72 (42.1%) full-time, 33 (19.3%) part-time, and 3 (1.8%) unemployed.

=== Barrytown statistical area ===
Barrytown statistical area, which also includes Blackball, covers 733.59 km^{2} (283.24 sq mi) and had an estimated population of 1,100 as of June 2025, with a population density of 1.5 people per km^{2}.

Historical population for Barrytown statistical area
Year	Pop.	±% p.a.
2006	918	—
2013	909	−0.14%
2018	939	+0.65%
2023	1,059	+2.43%

The statistical area had a population of 1,059 in the 2023 New Zealand census, an increase of 120 people (12.8%) since the 2018 census, and an increase of 150 people (16.5%) since the 2013 census. There were 564 males and 489 females in 468 dwellings. 3.1% of people identified as LGBTIQ+. The median age was 50.7 years (compared with 38.1 years nationally). There were 147 people (13.9%) aged under 15 years, 132 (12.5%) aged 15 to 29, 567 (53.5%) aged 30 to 64, and 213 (20.1%) aged 65 or older.

People could identify as more than one ethnicity. The results were 90.9% European (Pākehā); 10.8% Māori; 1.1% Pasifika; 2.3% Asian; 0.6% Middle Eastern, Latin American and African New Zealanders (MELAA); and 7.1% other, which includes people giving their ethnicity as "New Zealander". English was spoken by 98.3%, Māori by 1.4%, Samoan by 0.3%, and other languages by 7.1%. No language could be spoken by 1.1% (e.g. too young to talk). New Zealand Sign Language was known by 0.8%. The percentage of people born overseas was 13.0, compared with 28.8% nationally.

Religious affiliations were 24.6% Christian, 0.3% Islam, 0.3% Māori religious beliefs, 0.3% Buddhist, 1.4% New Age, and 1.7% other religions. People who answered that they had no religion were 60.3%, and 10.5% of people did not answer the census question.

Of those at least 15 years old, 126 (13.8%) people had a bachelor's or higher degree, 531 (58.2%) had a post-high school certificate or diploma, and 258 (28.3%) people exclusively held high school qualifications. The median income was $31,400, compared with $41,500 nationally. 57 people (6.2%) earned over $100,000 compared to 12.1% nationally. The employment status of those at least 15 was 420 (46.1%) full-time, 153 (16.8%) part-time, and 24 (2.6%) unemployed.

== Economy and culture ==
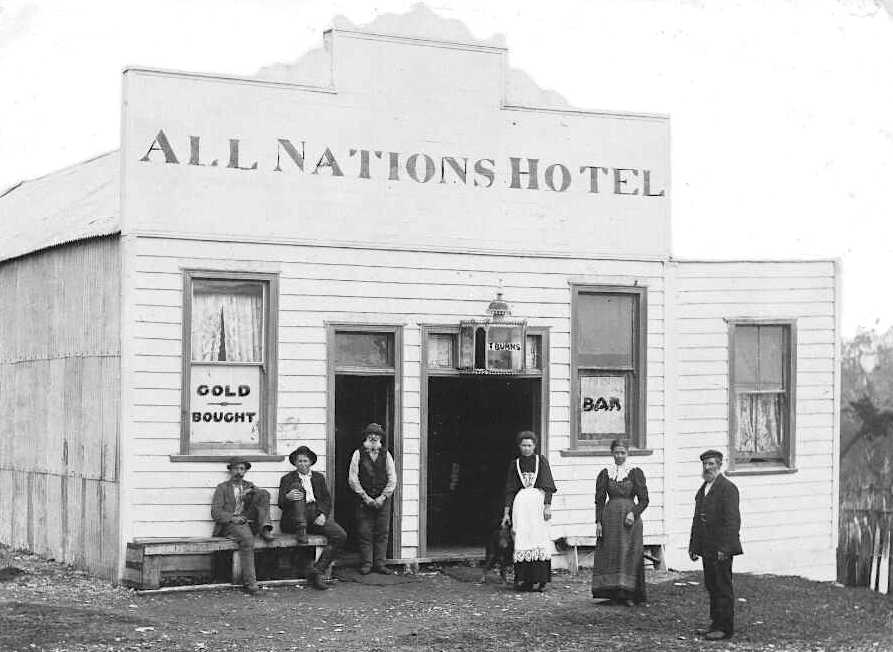
The All Nations Hotel in 1898

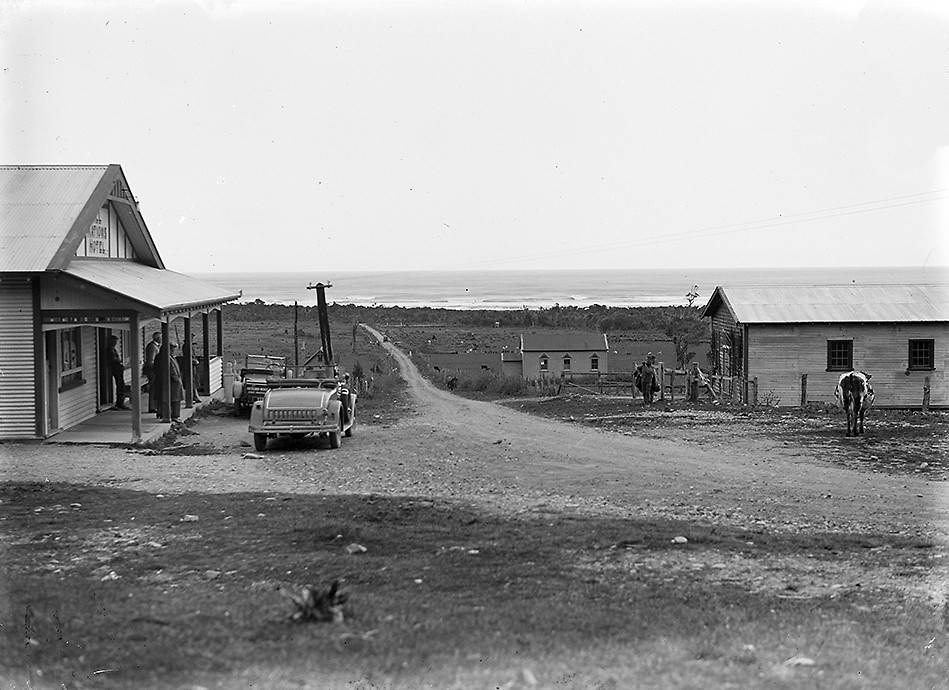
All Nations Hotel on the left and the Barrytown Settlers Hall on the right (1930s)

Barrytown is a hub for arts and crafts, including stone carving and knife making.

=== All Nations Hotel ===
The Barrytown hotel was built in 1879, and taken over by Thomas Burns in 1884. It had seven bedrooms, and an additional building that slept 10. It was notable for its billiard room with an Alcock table. The hotel is still in operation today.

=== Barrytown Settlers Hall ===
Built in 1929, the Barrytown Settlers Hall is a well-known music venue and has been hosting gigs since 1972. International and local bands touring New Zealand often perform there include Blerta, Trinity Roots, the New Zealand Guitar Quartet, Karen Pfeiffer, Scott Cook and The Kugels, The Mint Chicks, Bad Manners and Don McGlashan. There have been as many as 25 events per year. In 2017, a crowdsourcing campaign (through 'Give a Little') was started to fund the soundproofing of the hall following resident complaints about noise.

=== Barrytown Flats ===
The town is located near the southern end of a 17 km (11 mi) coastal plain known as the Barrytown Flats. The sands were extensively sluiced and dredged for gold from the 1860s. The drier areas of the flats have been converted into pasture, but significant areas of forest remain, including Nikau Scenic Reserve. The flats are bordered by Paparoa National Park and the only breeding site of the Westland petrel (Procellaria westlandica). There are significant deposits of ilmenite (titanium dioxide) in the Barrytown sands, and there have been several mining proposals, but the possible environmental consequences have been contentious.

== Education ==
The first school was built in the early 1880s after an inspector for the Westland Education Board visited Barrytown (then called Seventeen Mile Beach) and determined there were 57 children of school age. The Central Board recommended that a school be built and a school committee established. The school was originally on the beach, but was moved to its current site in the 1920s. It was destroyed in a fire in 1960, and rebuilt.

Barrytown School is a coeducational full primary (years 1–8) school with a roll of 37 students as of July 2026.

== Climate ==
Climate data for Barrytown (1981–2010)
Month	Jan	Feb	Mar	Apr	May	Jun	Jul	Aug	Sep	Oct	Nov	Dec	Year
Mean daily maximum °C (°F)	19.8 (67.6)	20.4 (68.7)	19.3 (66.7)	17.1 (62.8)	15.3 (59.5)	13.4 (56.1)	13.0 (55.4)	13.4 (56.1)	14.4 (57.9)	15.4 (59.7)	16.7 (62.1)	18.6 (65.5)	16.4 (61.5)
Daily mean °C (°F)	16.4 (61.5)	16.9 (62.4)	15.8 (60.4)	13.9 (57.0)	12.2 (54.0)	10.4 (50.7)	9.8 (49.6)	10.3 (50.5)	11.3 (52.3)	12.2 (54.0)	13.4 (56.1)	15.2 (59.4)	13.2 (55.7)
Mean daily minimum °C (°F)	12.9 (55.2)	13.3 (55.9)	12.3 (54.1)	10.6 (51.1)	9.2 (48.6)	7.4 (45.3)	6.6 (43.9)	7.2 (45.0)	8.2 (46.8)	9.0 (48.2)	10.1 (50.2)	11.9 (53.4)	9.9 (49.8)
Average rainfall mm (inches)	246.3 (9.70)	181.9 (7.16)	200.4 (7.89)	220.4 (8.68)	255.5 (10.06)	225.0 (8.86)	223.5 (8.80)	168.2 (6.62)	228.3 (8.99)	248.2 (9.77)	243.7 (9.59)	290.6 (11.44)	2,732 (107.56)
Source: NIWA (rain 1971–2000)
