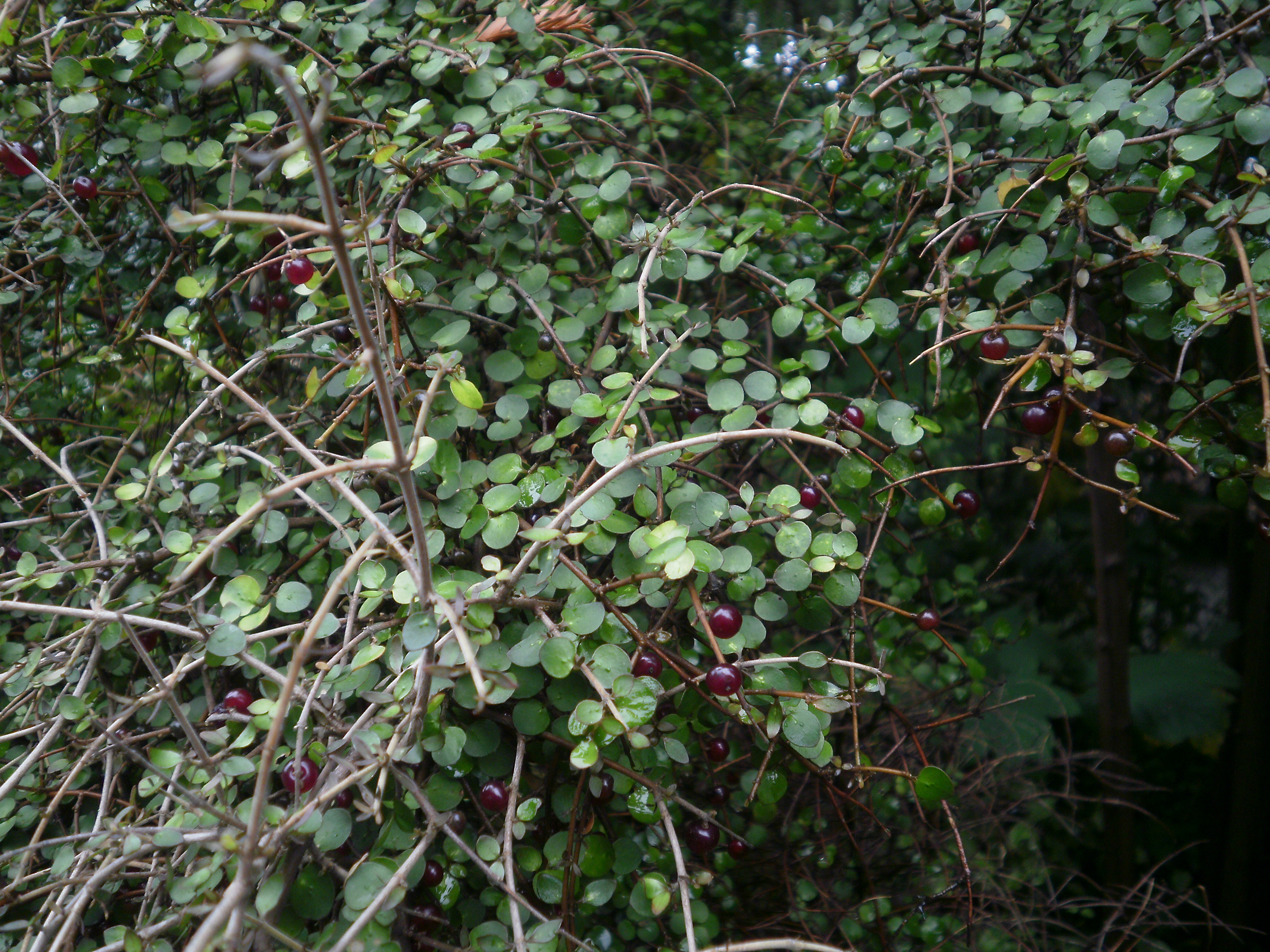

Scientific classification
- Kingdom: Plantae
- Clade: Tracheophytes
- Clade: Angiosperms
- Clade: Eudicots
- Clade: Asterids
- Order: Gentianales
- Family: Rubiaceae
- Genus: Coprosma
- Species: C. rhamnoides

Binomial name
- Coprosma rhamnoides A.Cunn.

= Coprosma rhamnoides =

Species of flowering plant

Coprosma rhamnoides, commonly known as twiggy coprosma or red-currant coprosma, is an endemic species of shrub found in New Zealand. It forms a small shrub up to 2 m tall. The leaves are very small, simple and variable in shape. The inconspicuous flowers are unisexual and believed to be wind pollinated. It is widespread in occurrence and can be the dominant small leaved divaricating shrub in some locations

== Description ==
It is a dense shrub. which can sprawl over rocks. It is typically less than 1 metre tall. with thin, divaricating branches. This gives a distinct twiggy appearance which accounts for the common name ‘twiggy coprosma’.

The leaves are leathery and matte with a glabrous lamina which appears reticulate on the underside where it may also be pubescent.

The opposite leaves are often in bundles with very short petioles and are 7 – 12 mm long.

The leaves are variable in size and shape. This can depend on maturity. The common broad shape leaves are orbicular. The leaves narrow quickly into the pubescent petiole. The hairs continue onto the lower area of the leaf).

The almost microscopic stipules at the base of the leaves are also pubescent with a sharp denticle at their apices.

The branches are small, about 10 mm in diameter and numerous, which makes the shrub dense. The branches are rigid and growing in many directions which creates the twiggy appearance. The bark is a reddish brown colour, and when scratched, it exposes a yellow/green colour.

The flowers are small and borne in the axils. Both male and female corollas comprise four lobed petals. The male petal is 2.7 mm, whereas the female is 1.3mm long and are more narrow and funnel shaped. The male has four stamens.

The fruit are fleshy, globose berries, of a crimson or ruby red colour distributed solitarily along the branchlets.

== Geographic distribution and habitat ==
C rhamnoides species is endemic to New Zealand and is common throughout New Zealand, except for Otago, Southland and Fiordland.

=== Habitat preferences ===
C.rhamnoides prefers lowland areas, including the lower ranges of mountains around the edges of forests or in shrubland. It frequently grows as understorey vegetation of Leptospermum (mānuka) and Kunzea (kānuka).

=== Life cycle and phenology ===
C. rhamnoides has a small seed with fleshy red berry surrounding it. The seedlings start to appear after two or three months Once the shrub is grown, small flowers occur. This would be during Spring from September to October. The flowers are wind pollinated. Soon after, in November, the flowers form small green berries. These berries ripen and turn red by June the next year. The berries can remain on the shrub, and over ripen as they turn a crimson or black colour.

== Environmental conditions ==
C. rhamnoides can grow in the most hardy conditions, under high wind and weather exposure and in sunny or rainy environmental conditions

== Predators, parasites, and diseases ==
Native lizards and frugivorous birds are likely seed dispersers for this species, including kererū, tūī, korimako (bellbird), stitchbird, and weka. Introduced rodents likely eat the fruit and seed.

The leaves are appetising for mammals such as goats, deer or cattle. However, as the twiggy coprosma name suggests, the divaricating structure makes it difficult for grazers to access the leaves and berries.

A slightly more adapted herbivore to the twiggy coprosma is the ‘coprosma leaf beetle’. This species can chew holes in the young leaves. This beetle appears around Spring time on the shrub. It can jump from leaf to leaf. Other herbivorous insects include three native caterpillars. These are the Dark Coprosma Carpet moth - Austrocidaria similata Coprosma pug moth - Pasiphila sandycias Pallid Coprosma leafroller - Leucotenes coprosmae Lastly, two coprosma scale insects are herbivores of the coprosma rhamnoides.

Two gall mites are parasites of the coprosma rhamnoides and also several gall midges. The mites can cause a discolouration in the leaves. They make the leaves turn yellow.

== Other information ==
Coprosma rhamnoides is the most common small-leaved coprosma in New Zealand. New Zealand has approximately 30 in total.

The coprosma rhamnoides is not usually grown in gardens, likely due to the scruffy and twig-like appearance. However, if it were to be cultivated, it can grow roots from semi-hardwood cuttings when placed in the ground.

== See also ==
- Coprosma spathulata
