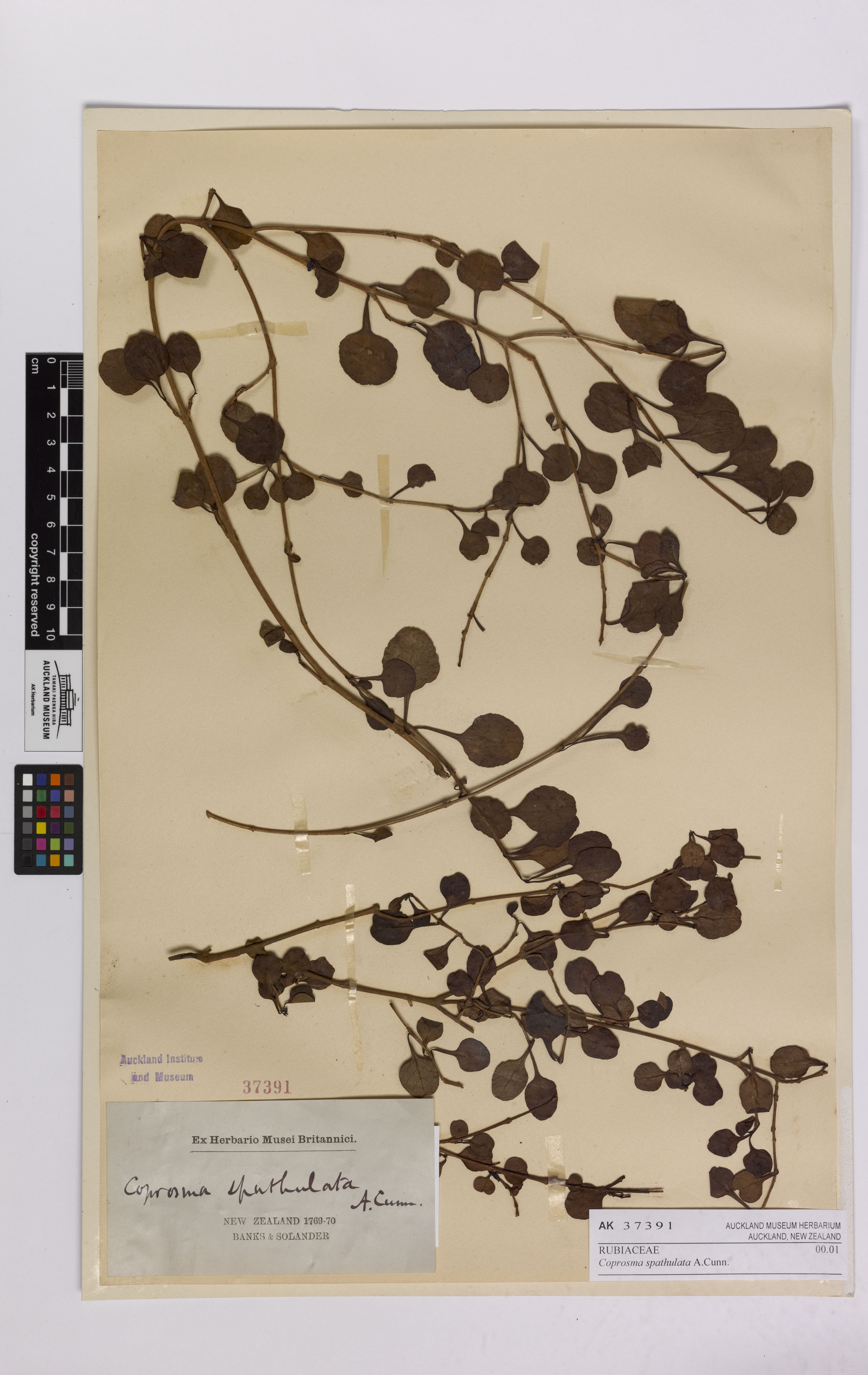

Scientific classification
- Kingdom: Plantae
- Clade: Tracheophytes
- Clade: Angiosperms
- Clade: Eudicots
- Clade: Asterids
- Order: Gentianales
- Family: Rubiaceae
- Genus: Coprosma
- Species: C. spathulata

Binomial name
- Coprosma spathulata A.Cunn.

= Coprosma spathulata =

Species of plant

Coprosma spathulata is a shrub that is native to New Zealand. An example occurrence of this species is within the Hamilton Ecological District in the North Island within a forest dominated by Nothofagus and rimu, where understory associates include Blechnum discolor and Doodia media.
