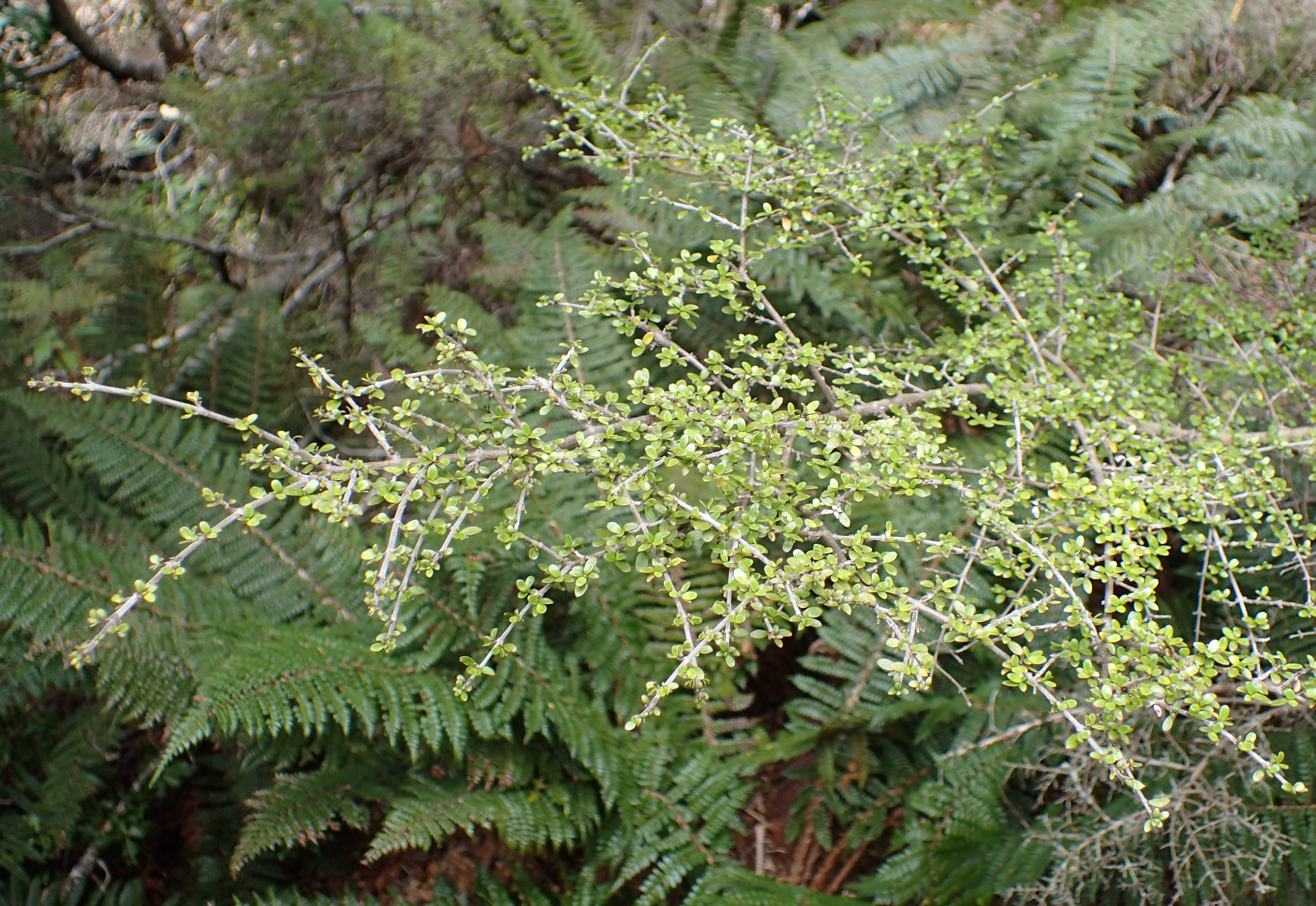

Conservation status
- Not Threatened (NZ TCS)

Scientific classification
- Kingdom: Plantae
- Clade: Embryophytes
- Clade: Tracheophytes
- Clade: Angiosperms
- Clade: Eudicots
- Clade: Asterids
- Order: Gentianales
- Family: Rubiaceae
- Genus: Coprosma
- Species: C. dumosa

Binomial name
- Coprosma dumosa (Cheeseman) G.T.Jane

= Coprosma dumosa =

Species of flowering plant

Coprosma dumosa is a species of Coprosma, endemic to New Zealand.

== Description ==
A small shrubby leafy bush with small leaves. Glabrous on the underside of the leaf, with short hairs on the branchlets.

== Range ==
Known from both the North Island, South Island, and Stewart Island.

== Habitat ==
Lowland to montane forests.

== Ecology ==
The mistletoe Korthalsella clavata uses Coprosma dumosa as a secondary host.

== Etymology ==
The specific name dumosa means 'bushy' in Latin.

== Taxonomy ==
Coprosoma dumosa may be identical to Coprosma tayloriae. It also hybridizes with other Coprosma species.
