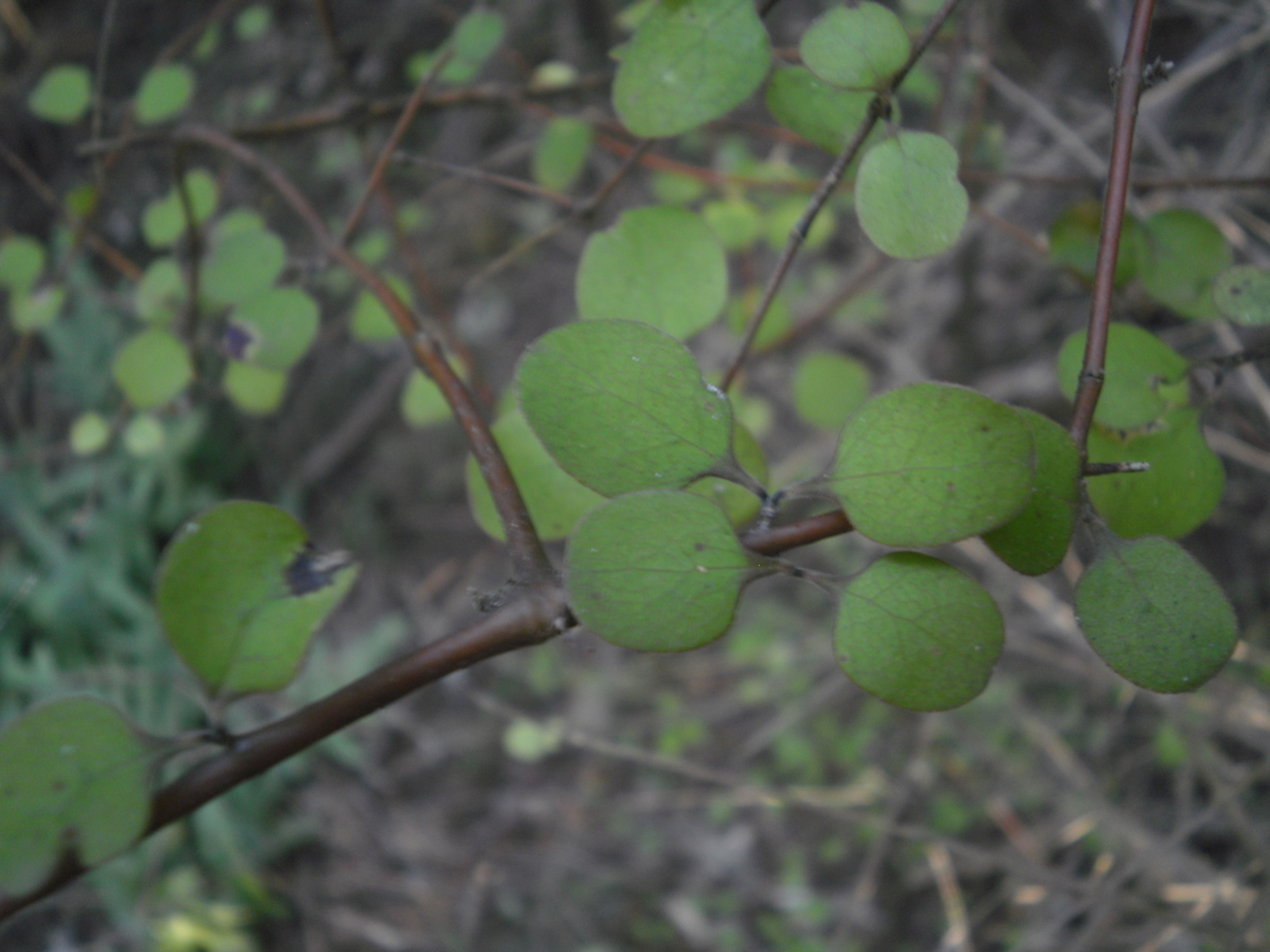

Scientific classification
- Kingdom: Plantae
- Clade: Tracheophytes
- Clade: Angiosperms
- Clade: Eudicots
- Clade: Asterids
- Order: Gentianales
- Family: Rubiaceae
- Genus: Coprosma
- Species: C. crassifolia

Binomial name
- Coprosma crassifolia Colenso

= Coprosma crassifolia =

Species of plant

Coprosma crassifolia, commonly known as Mingimingi, is an erect forest shrub with red-brown branchlets that is endemic to New Zealand.

== Description ==
Mingimingi is a much branched shrub often 1-2 metres and up to 4 metres high with green flowers from September to October. It fruits from November to June with translucent berries that holds white seed, which is attractive to skinks and birds. The leaves are 6-10 mm long by 5 mm wide tapering at the base. It has opposite paired leaves that are small roundish, stiff and remotely spaced leaves and that are glossy dark green on top and whitish underneath. Both are distinguishing features

== Taxonomy and etymology ==
C crassifolia was described by Colenso in 1846.

Coprosma is from the Greek kopros and osme meaning dung smell. Crassifolia is from the Latin, meaning thick leaf.

== Distribution and habitat ==
It is found in scrublands, forests, and coasts, up to approximately 600 metres in both the North and South Islands of New Zealand.

== Conservation status ==
As at 2023 this species status is not threatened
