= Auckland =

Largest city in New Zealand

Auckland Tāmaki Makaurau (Māori)
- Metropolitan city
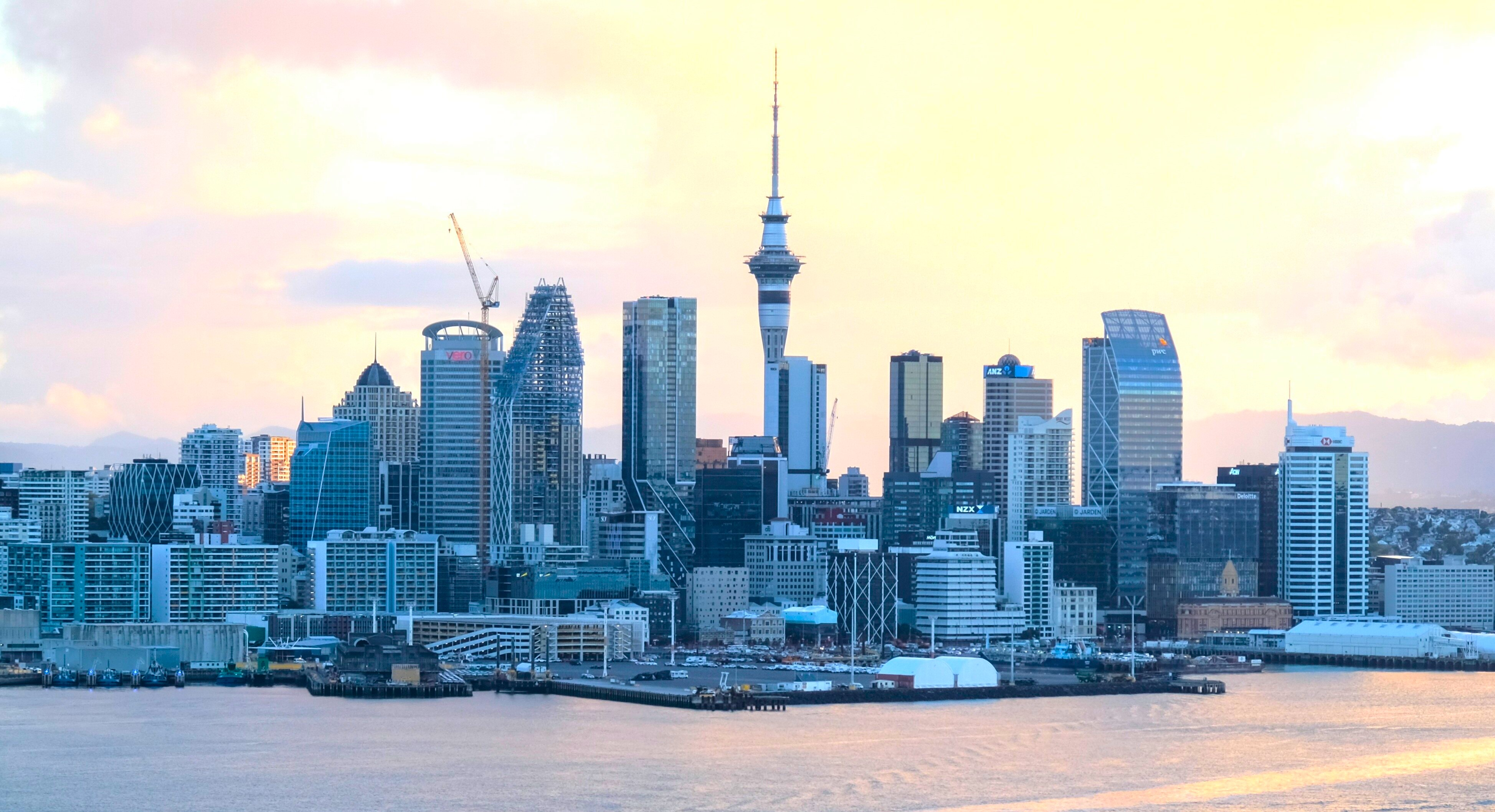
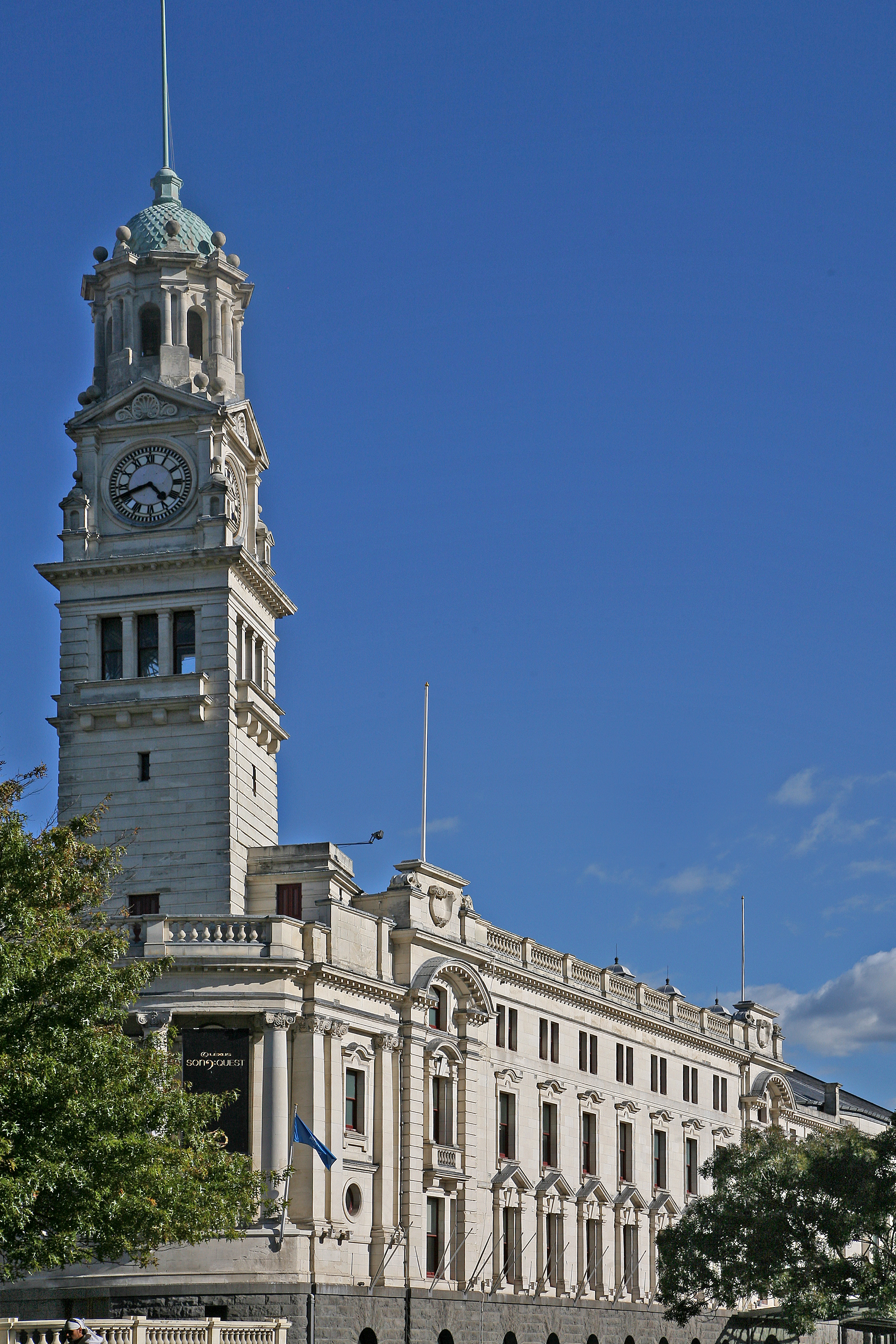
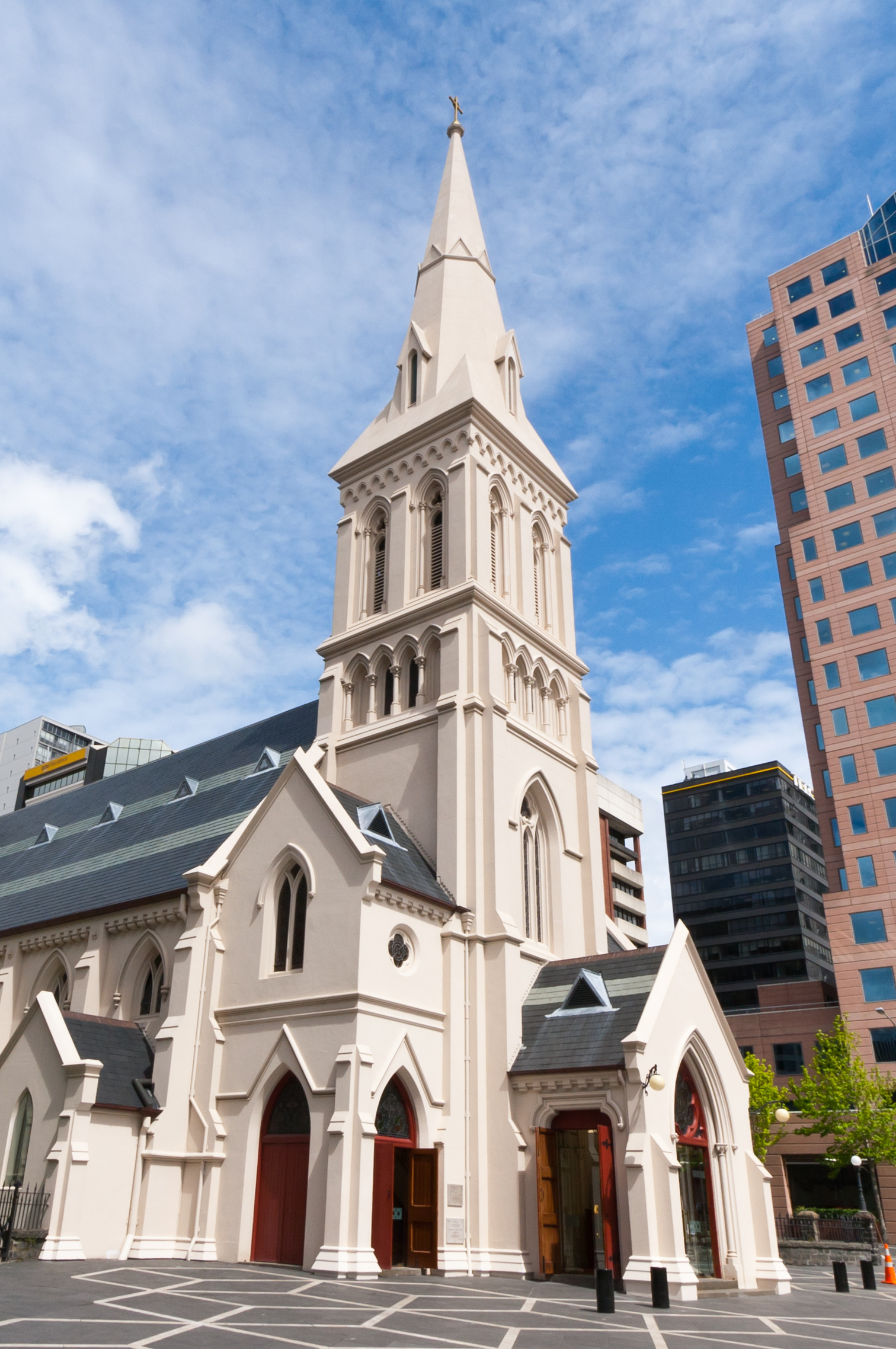
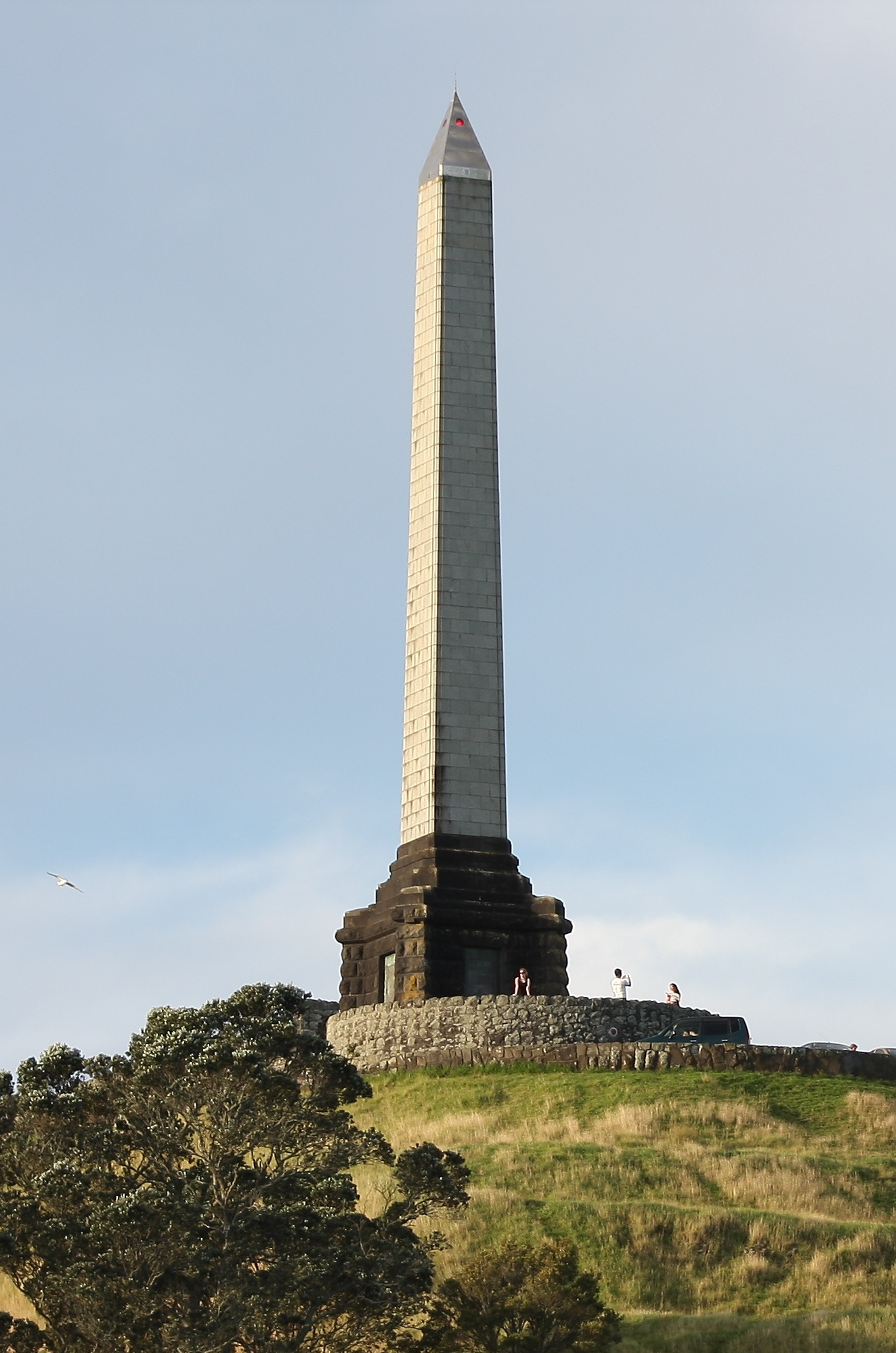
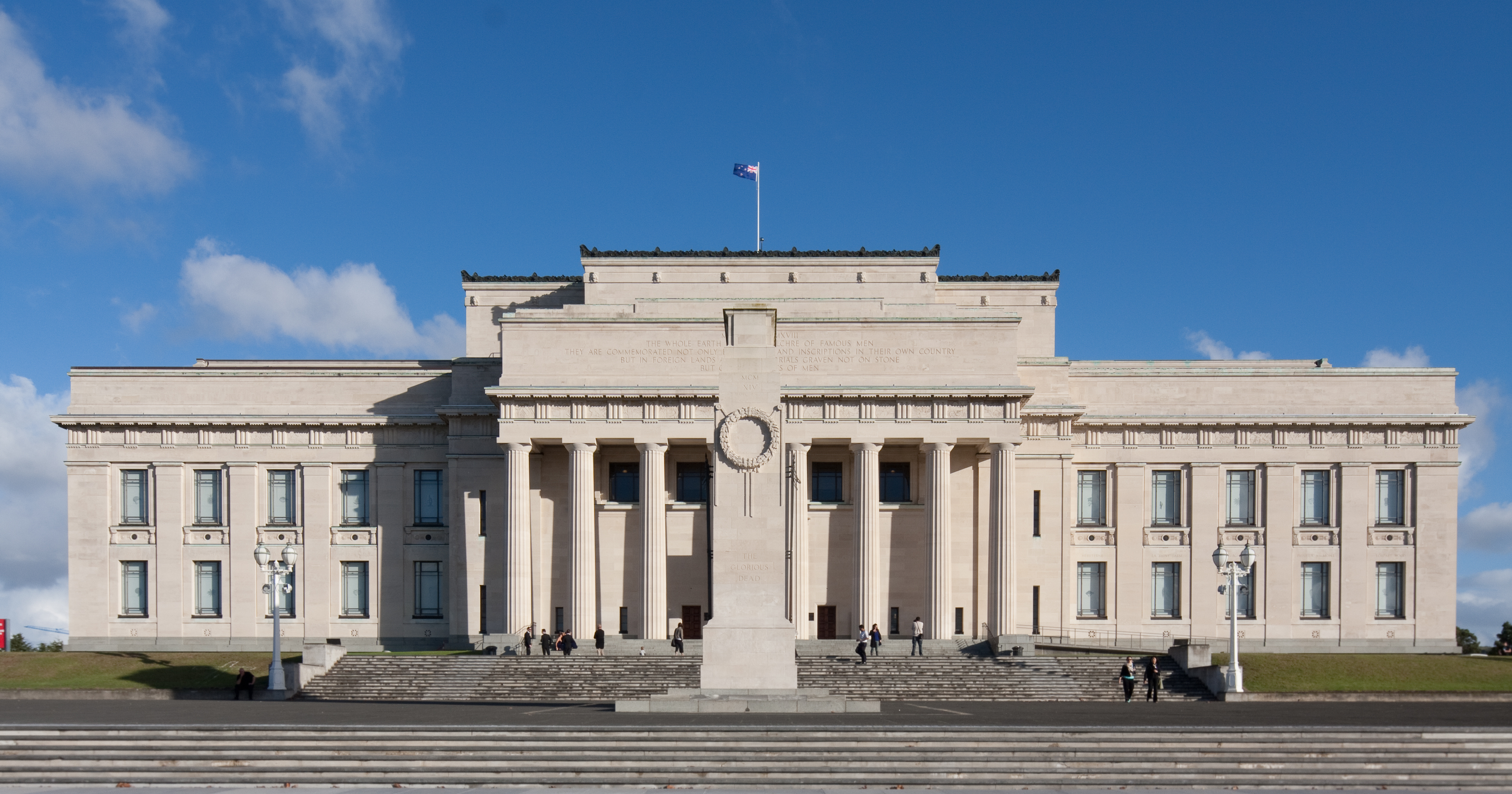
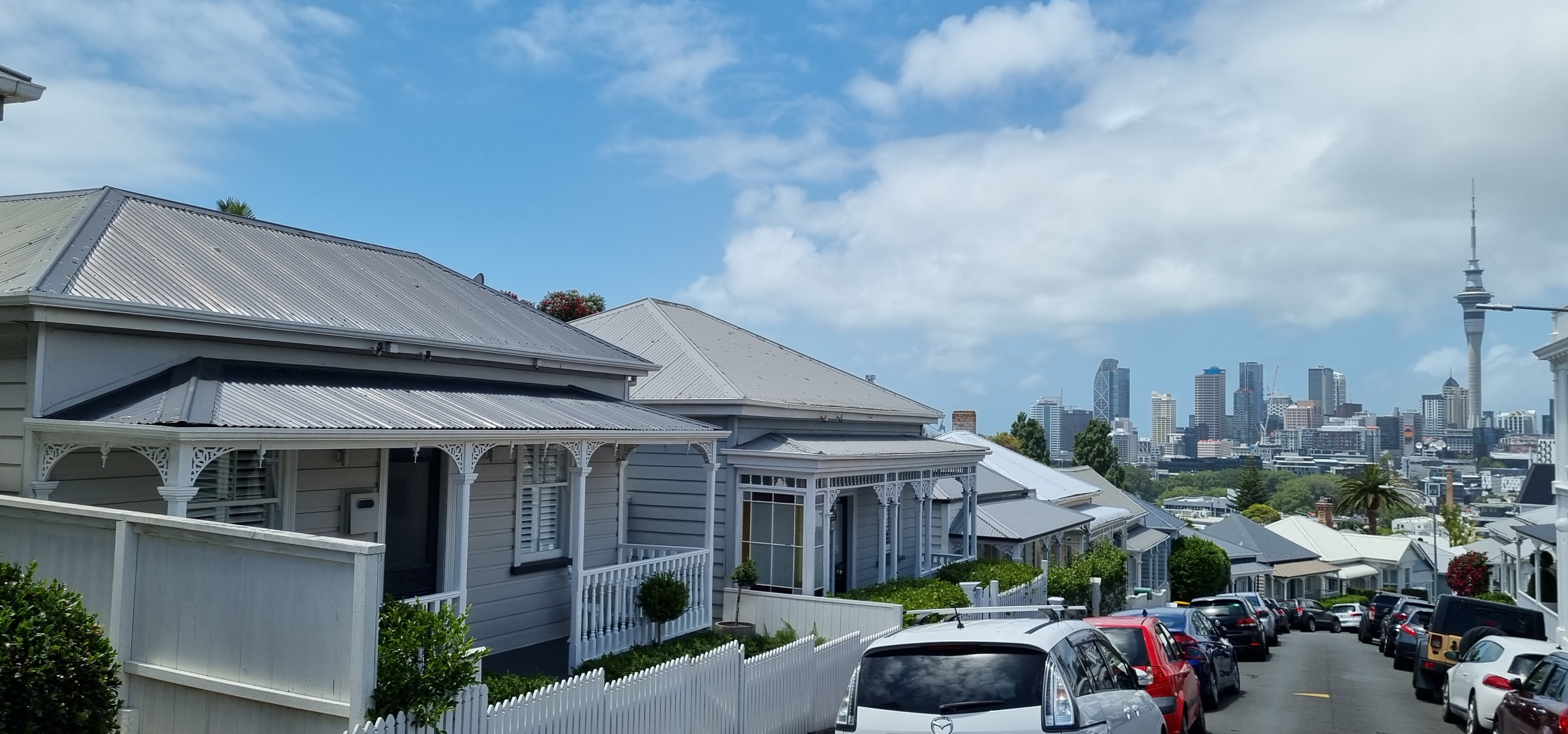
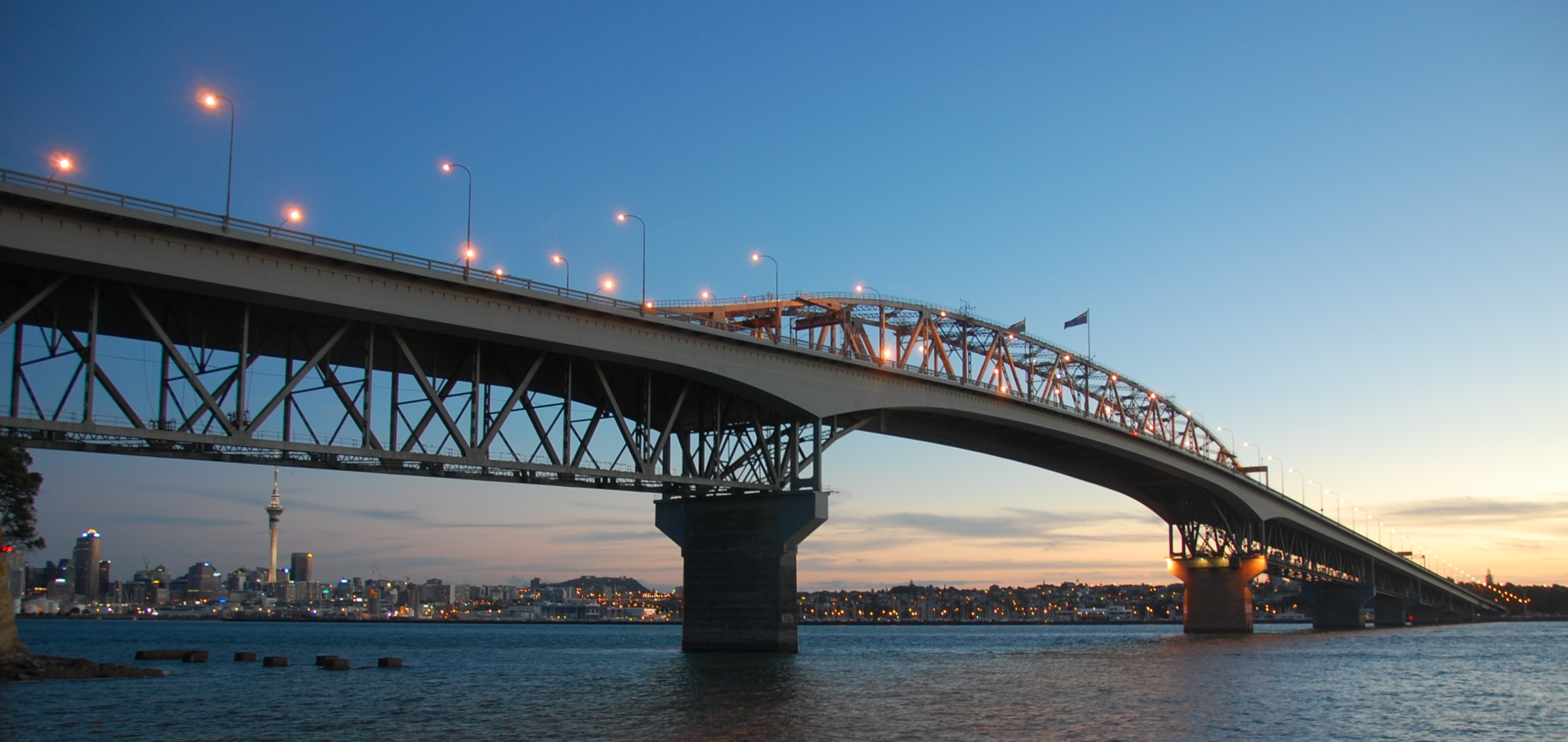
- Auckland CBD Auckland Town Hall St Patrick's Cathedral One Tree Hill War Memorial Museum Ponsonby Auckland Harbour Bridge
- Nicknames: City of Sails; Queen City
- Location in New Zealand Location in Oceania
- Coordinates: 36°50′57″S 174°45′55″E
- Country: New Zealand
- Island: North Island
- Region: Auckland
- Founded: 18 September 1840
- Named for: George Eden, 1st Earl of Auckland
- NZ Parliament: Electorates Auckland Central; Botany; East Coast Bays; Epsom; Hauraki-Waikato (Māori); Kaipara ki Mahurangi; Kelston; Māngere; Manurewa; Maungakiekie; Mount Albert; Mount Roskill; New Lynn; North Shore; Northcote; Pakuranga; Panmure-Ōtāhuhu; Papakura; Port Waikato; Takanini; Tāmaki; Tāmaki Makaurau (Māori); Te Atatū; Te Tai Tokerau (Māori); Upper Harbour; Whangaparāoa
- Local boards: List: Hibiscus and Bays; Upper Harbour; Kaipātiki; Devonport-Takapuna; Waitākere Ranges; Henderson-Massey; Whau; Albert-Eden; Puketāpapa; Waitematā; Ōrākei; Maungakiekie-Tamaki; Māngere-Ōtāhuhu; Otara-Papatoetoe; Howick; Manurewa; Papakura; Franklin; Rodney

Government
  - Body: Auckland Council
  - Mayor: Wayne Brown
  - Deputy Mayor: Desley Simpson
  - MPs: Representatives Andrew Bayly (National); Simeon Brown (National); Mariameno Kapa-Kingi (Independent); Dan Bidois (National); Rima Nakhle (National); Christopher Luxon (National); Hana-Rawhiti Maipi-Clarke (Te Pāti Māori); Mark Mitchell (National); Oriini Kaipara (Te Pati Maori); Brooke Van Velden (ACT); Chris Penk (National); Greg Fleming (National); Paulo Garcia (National); Jenny Salesa (Labour); Carmel Sepuloni (Labour); David Seymour (ACT); Lemauga Lydia Sosene (Labour); Erica Stanford (National); Chlöe Swarbrick (Green); Phil Twyford (Labour); Cameron Brewer (National); Simon Watts (National); Arena Williams (Labour); Carlos Cheung (National); Helen White (Labour)

Area
  - Urban: 605.67 km^{2} (233.85 sq mi)
  - Metro: 3,358.8 km^{2} (1,296.8 sq mi)
- Highest elevation: 196 m (643 ft)
- Lowest elevation: 0 m (0 ft)

Population (June 2025)
  - Urban: 1,547,200
  - Urban density: 2,554.5/km^{2} (6,616.2/sq mi)
  - Metro: 1,794,400
  - Metro density: 534.24/km^{2} (1,383.7/sq mi)
  - Auckland Region: 1,816,000
  - Demonym: Aucklander

GDP (nominal, 2025)
  - Auckland Region: NZ$167 billion (US$118.44 billion)
  - Per capita: NZ$91,960 (US$65,219.86)
- Time zone: UTC+12:00 (NZST)
  - Summer (DST): UTC+13:00 (NZDT)
- Postcode(s): 0600–2699
- Area code: 09
- Local iwi: Ngāti Whātua, Tainui, Ngāti Ākarana (pan-tribal)
- Website: aucklandcouncil.govt.nz

Auckland (Note: /ˈɔːk.lənd/, AWK-lənd; Māori: Tāmaki Makaurau, Ākarana, Māori pronunciation of Tāmaki Makaurau) is a large metropolitan city in the North Island of New Zealand. It has an urban population of approximately 1,547,200 (June 2025). It is located in the greater Auckland Region, the area governed by Auckland Council, which includes outlying rural areas and the islands of the Hauraki Gulf, and which has a total population of 1,816,000 as of June 2025. It is the most populous city of New Zealand and the fifth-most populous city in Oceania.

The city lies between the Hauraki Gulf to the east, the Hunua Ranges to the south-east, the Manukau Harbour to the south-west, and the Waitākere Ranges and smaller ranges to the west and north-west. The surrounding hills are covered in rainforest and the landscape is dotted with 53 volcanic centres that make up the Auckland Volcanic Field. The central part of the urban area occupies a narrow isthmus between the Manukau Harbour on the Tasman Sea and the Waitematā Harbour on the Pacific Ocean. Auckland is one of the few cities in the world to have a harbour on each of two separate major bodies of water.

The Auckland isthmus was first settled c. 1350 and was valued for its rich and fertile land. The Māori population in the area is estimated to have peaked at tens of thousands before the arrival of Europeans. After a British colony was established in New Zealand in 1840, William Hobson, then Lieutenant-Governor of New Zealand, chose Auckland as its new capital. Ngāti Whātua Ōrākei made a strategic gift of land to Hobson for the new capital. During the New Zealand wars many fencibles and soldiers were stationed in and around Auckland. (Note: No fighting occurred near Auckland, although fears of such attacks did exist at the time) In 1865, Auckland was replaced by Wellington as the capital, but continued to grow, initially because of its port and the logging and gold-mining activities in its hinterland, and later because of pastoral farming (especially dairy farming) in the surrounding area, and manufacturing in the city itself. It has been the nation's largest city throughout most of its history. Today, Auckland's central business district is New Zealand's leading economic hub.

While Europeans continue to make up the plurality of Auckland's population, the city became multicultural and cosmopolitan in the late 20th century, with Asians accounting for 34.9% of the city's population in 2023. In 2023 Auckland had the fourth largest foreign-born population in the world, with 43% of its residents born overseas. With its sizeable population of Pasifika New Zealanders, the city is also home to the largest ethnic Polynesian population in the world.

The University of Auckland, founded in 1883, is the largest university in New Zealand. The city's significant tourist attractions include national historic sites, festivals, performing arts, sports activities and a variety of cultural institutions, such as the Auckland War Memorial Museum, the Museum of Transport and Technology, and the Auckland Art Gallery. Its architectural landmarks include the Harbour Bridge, the Town Hall, the Ferry Building and the Sky Tower, which is the second-tallest building in the Southern Hemisphere after Thamrin Nine. The city is served by Auckland Airport, which handled 18.5 million passengers in 2024. Auckland is one of the world's most liveable cities, ranking fifth in the 2024 Mercer Quality of Living Survey and ninth in the 2024 Global Liveability Ranking by The Economist.

== Toponymy ==
The Māori-language name for Auckland is Tāmaki Makaurau, meaning "Tāmaki desired by many", in reference to the desirability of its natural resources and geography. There are various theories of the origin of the name Tāmaki, which is also used to refer to an eastern suburb of Auckland. It is regarded by some to be the isthmus between the two harbours of the area, which is variously said to be named after a son of Maruiwi from Taranaki, a line of chiefs from the southern Taranaki, or a female leader of Ngāti Te Ata. Other versions of the name include Tāmakinui (great Tāmaki) or Tāmaki-herehere-ngā-waka (Tāmaki that binds many canoes).

William Hobson named the area after George Eden, Earl of Auckland, British First Lord of the Admiralty. The Earldom of Auckland was named after West Auckland, a village in County Durham, Northern England. The name "Auckland" in West Auckland is thought to originate from the Cumbric word "Alclud", which was the Kingdom of Strathclyde's alternative name meaning "cliff on the Clyde". It is thought 'Clyde' may be the river Gaunless' old name.

Auckland is popularly nicknamed the "City of Sails" or the "Queen City".

== History ==
=== Early history ===
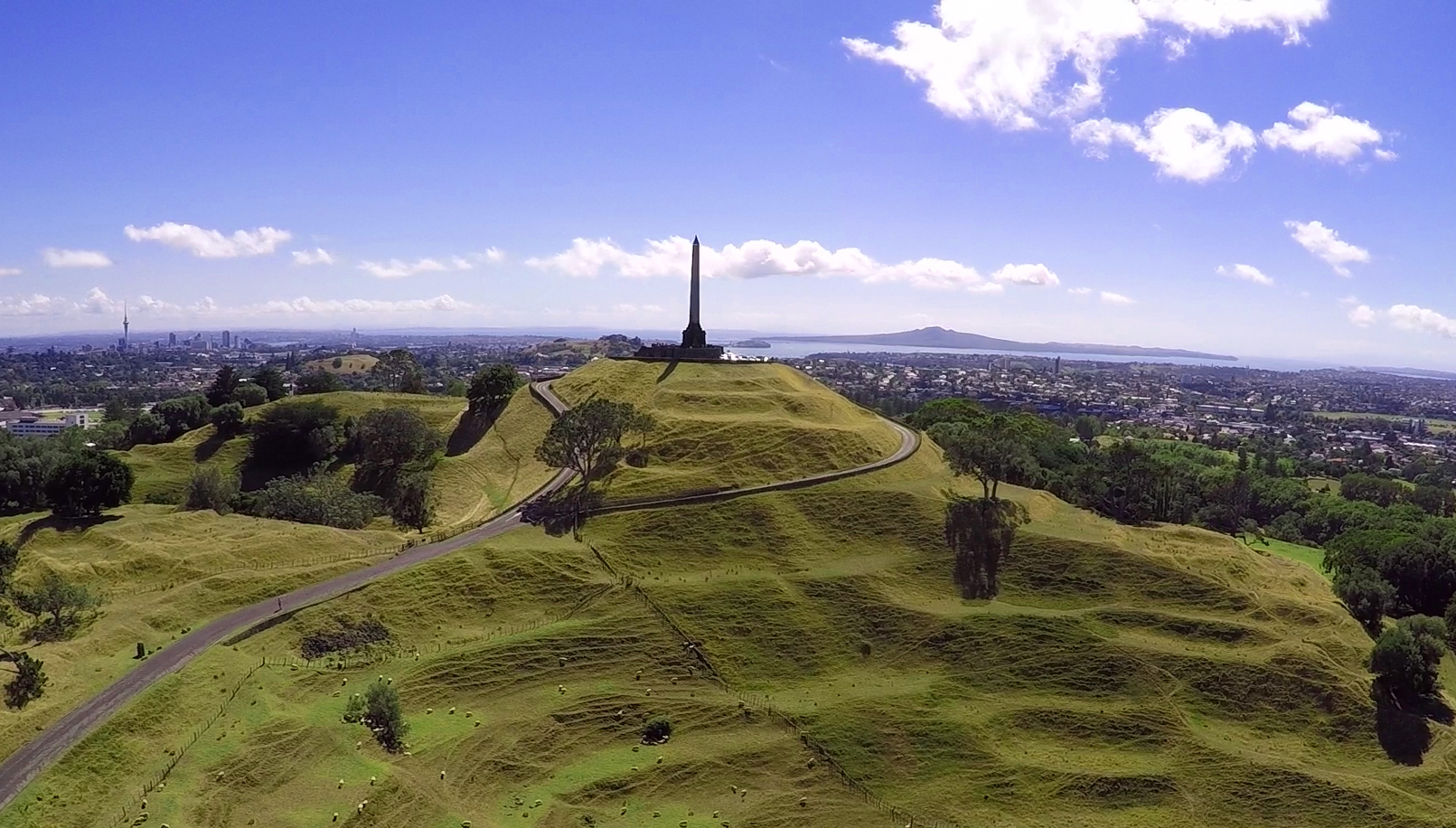
Maungakiekie / One Tree Hill, with Auckland city in the background, showing terraces of the Māori pā

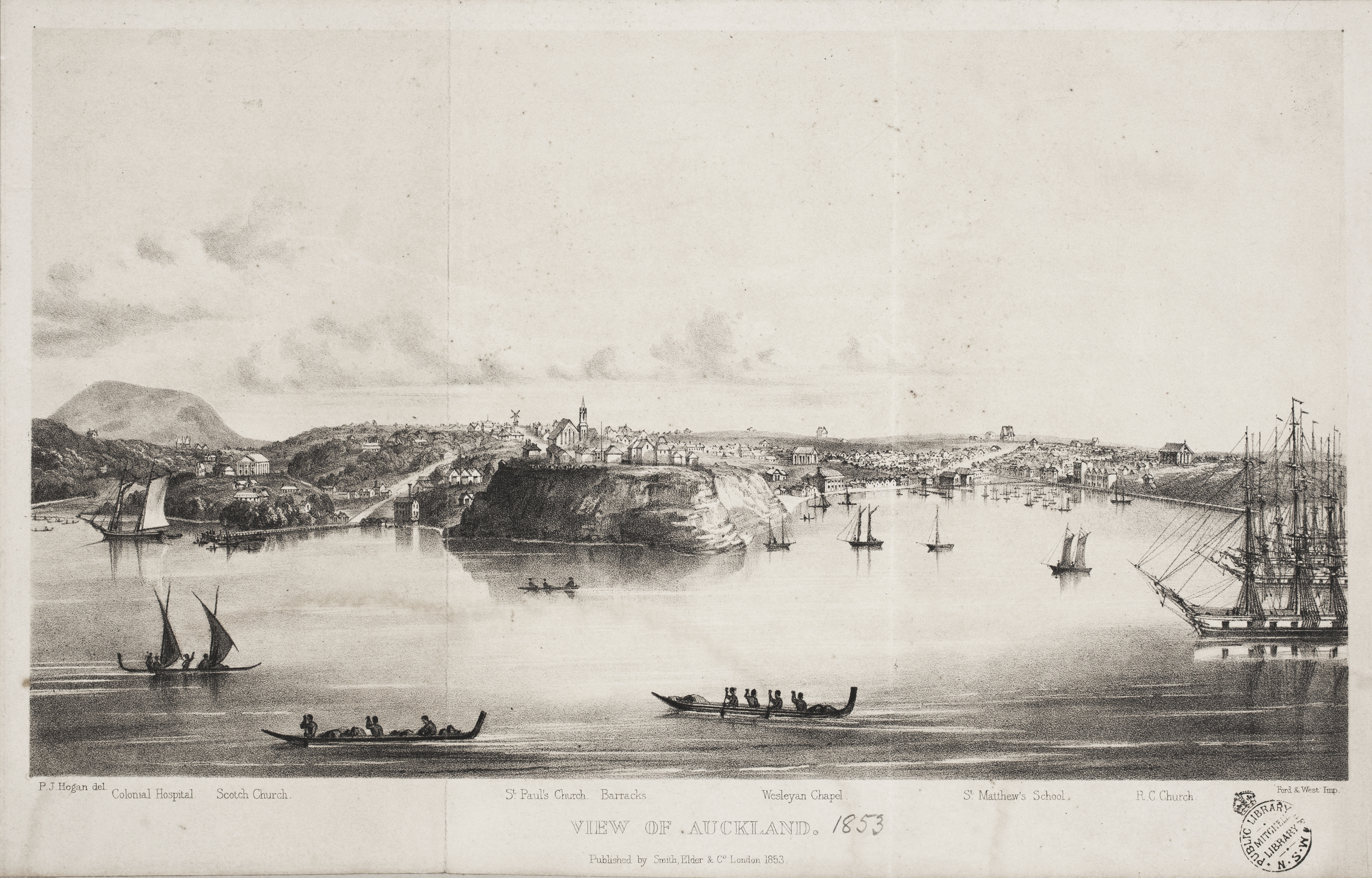
Auckland, 1853

The Auckland isthmus was settled by Māori around 1350, and was valued for its rich and fertile land. Many pā (fortified villages) were built, mainly on the volcanic peaks. By the early 1700s, Te Waiohua, a confederation of tribes such as Ngā Oho, Ngā Riki and Ngā Iwi, was the main tribal group on the Auckland isthmus, with major pā at Maungakiekie / One Tree Hill, Māngere Mountain and Maungataketake. The confederation came to an end around 1741 when paramount chief Kiwi Tāmaki was killed in battle by Te Waha-akiaki, a chief of the Ngāti Whātua hapū Te Taoū. From the 1740s, Ngāti Whātua Ōrākei were the main tribe on the Auckland isthmus. The Māori population in the area is estimated to have been about 20,000 before the arrival of Europeans. The introduction of firearms at the end of the eighteenth century, which began in Northland, upset the balance of power and led to devastating intertribal warfare beginning in 1807, causing iwi who lacked the new weapons to seek refuge in areas less exposed to coastal raids. As a result, the region had relatively low numbers of Māori when settlement by European New Zealanders began.

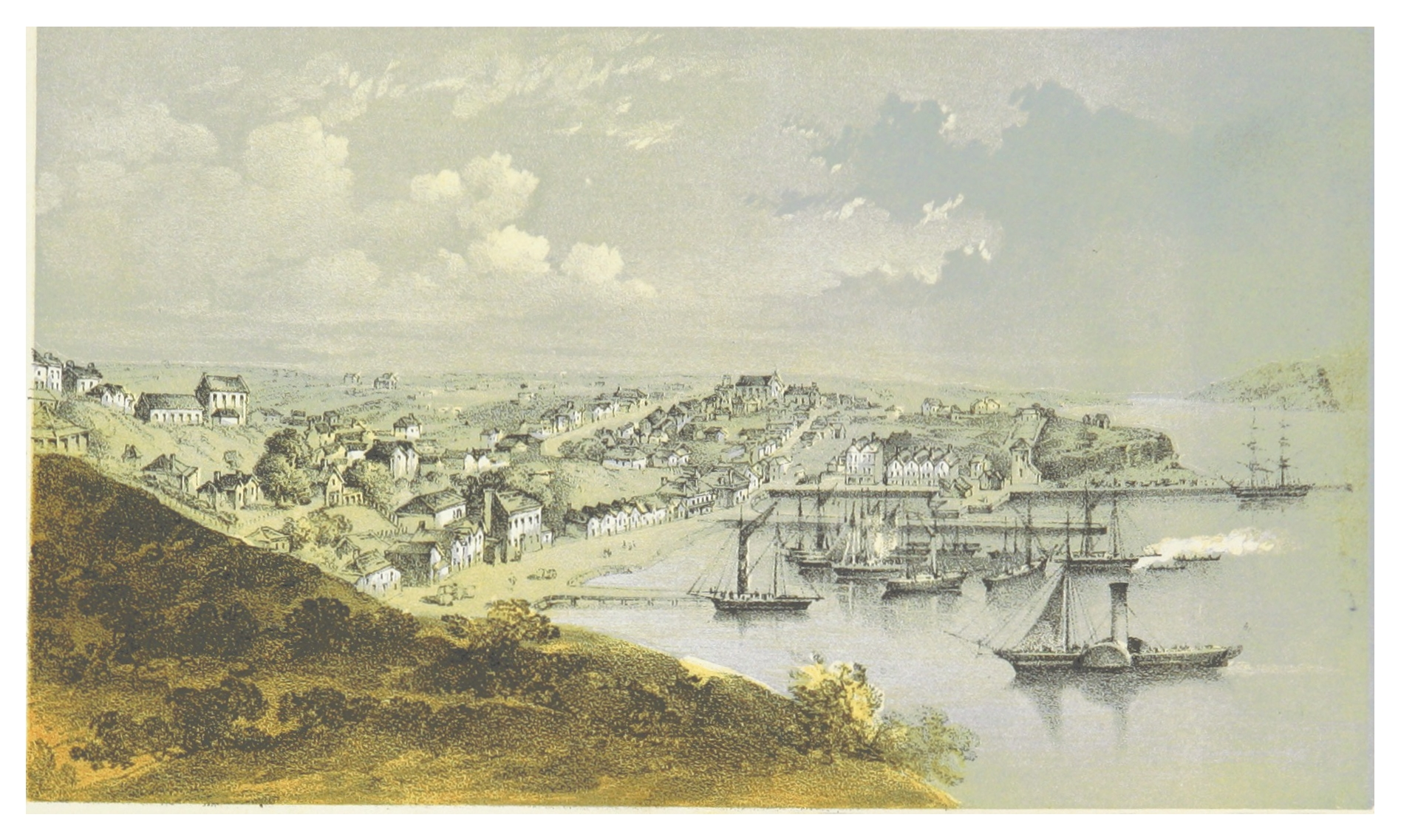
Print of a painting of Auckland port, 1857

On 20 March 1840 in the Manukau Harbour area where Ngāti Whātua farmed, paramount chief Apihai Te Kawau signed the Treaty of Waitangi. Ngāti Whātua sought British protection from Ngāpuhi as well as a reciprocal relationship with the Crown and the Church. Soon after signing the treaty, Ngāti Whātua Ōrākei made a strategic gift of 3,500 acres (1,400 ha) of land on the Waitematā Harbour to the new Governor of New Zealand, William Hobson, for the new capital, which Hobson named for George Eden, Earl of Auckland, then Viceroy of India. Auckland was founded on 18 September 1840 and was officially declared New Zealand's capital in 1841, and the transfer of the administration from Russell (now Old Russell) in the Bay of Islands was completed in 1842. However, even in 1840 Port Nicholson (later renamed Wellington) was seen as a better choice for an administrative capital because of its proximity to the South Island, and Wellington became the capital in 1865. After losing its status as capital, Auckland remained the principal city of the Auckland Province until the provincial system was abolished in 1876.

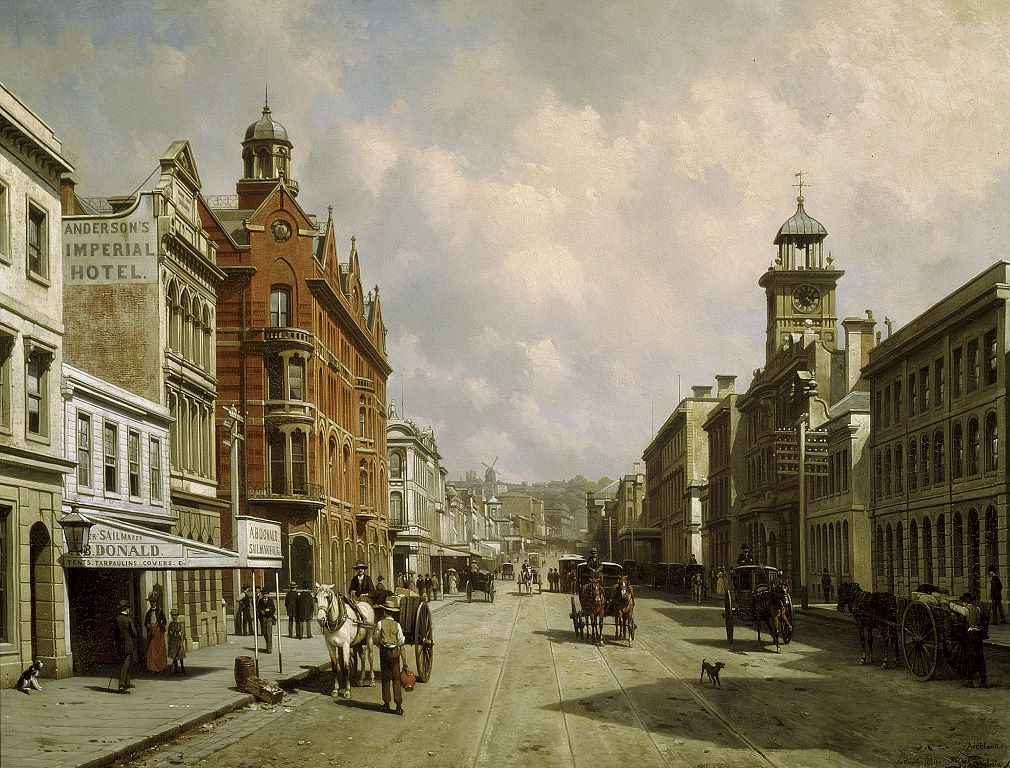
Queen Street (c. 1889); painting by Jacques Carabain. Most of the buildings depicted were demolished in the 1970s.

In response to the ongoing rebellion by Hōne Heke in the mid-1840s, the government encouraged retired but fit British soldiers and their families to migrate to Auckland to form a defence line around the port settlement as garrison soldiers. By the time the first Fencibles arrived in 1848, the Northern War had concluded. Outlying defensive towns were then constructed to the south, stretching in a line from the port village of Onehunga in the west to Howick in the east. Each of the four settlements had about 800 settlers.

In the early 1860s, Auckland became a base against the Māori King Movement, and the 12,000 Imperial soldiers stationed there gave a strong boost to local commerce. This, and continued road building towards the south into the Waikato region, enabled Pākehā (European New Zealanders) influence to spread from Auckland. The city's population grew fairly rapidly, from 1,500 in 1841 to 3,635 in 1845, then to 12,423 by 1864. The growth occurred similarly to other mercantile-dominated cities, mainly around the port and with problems of overcrowding and pollution. Auckland's population of ex-soldiers was far greater than that of other settlements: about 50 per cent of the population was Irish, which contrasted heavily with the majority English settlers in Wellington, Christchurch or New Plymouth. The majority of settlers in the early period were assisted by receiving cheap passage to New Zealand.

=== Modern history ===
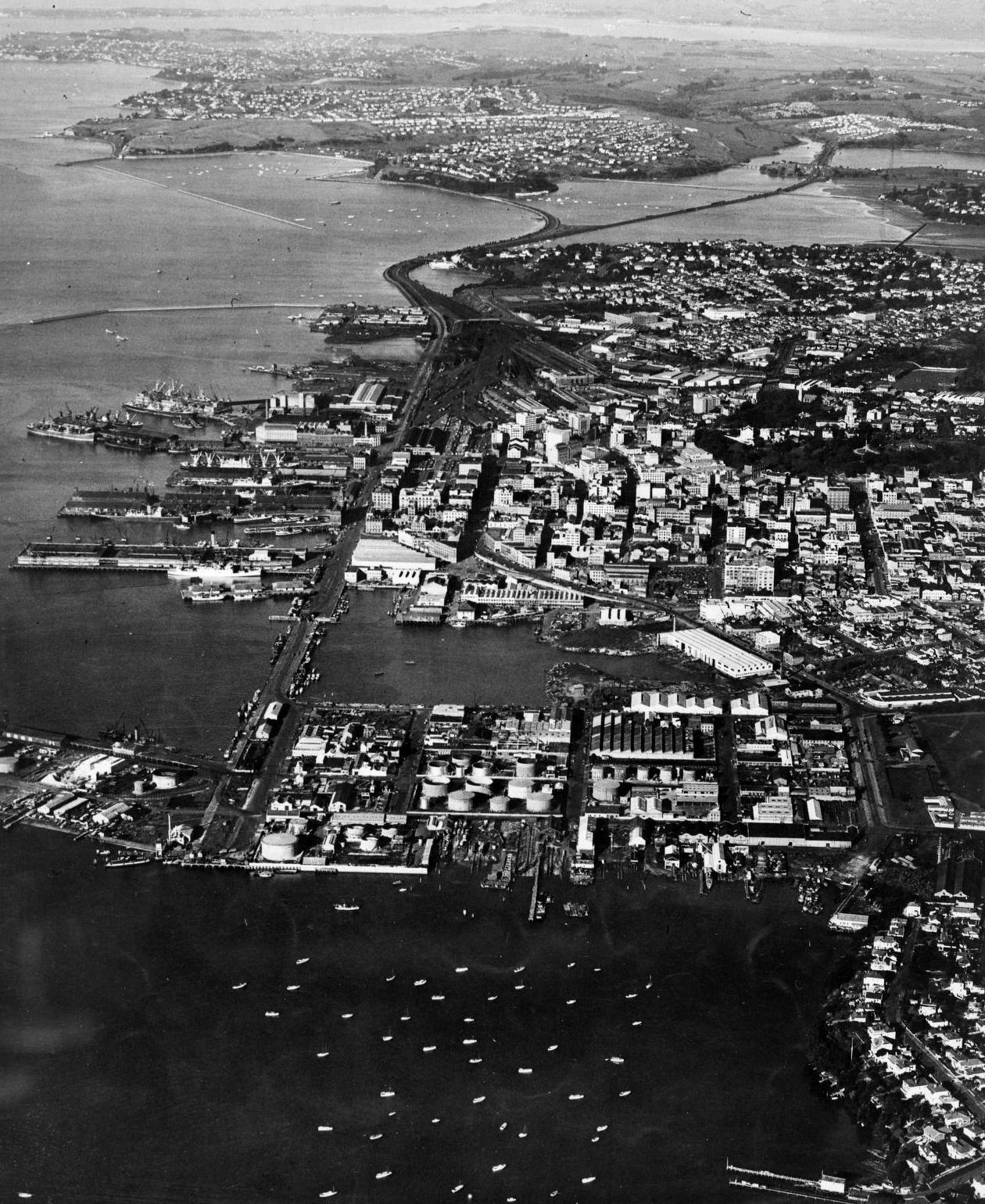
Looking east over the area that became Wynyard Quarter with the Auckland CBD in the middle distance, c. 1950s

Trams and railway lines shaped Auckland's rapid expansion in the early first half of the 20th century. However, after the Second World War, the city's transport system and urban form became increasingly dominated by the motor vehicle. Arterial roads and motorways became both defining and geographically dividing features of the urban landscape. They also allowed further massive expansion that resulted in the growth of suburban areas such as the North Shore (especially after the construction of the Auckland Harbour Bridge in the late 1950s), and Manukau City in the south.

Economic deregulation in the mid-1980s led to very dramatic changes to Auckland's economy, and many companies relocated their head offices from Wellington to Auckland. The region was now the nerve centre of the entire national economy. Auckland also benefited from a surge in tourism, which brought 75 per cent of New Zealand's international visitors through its airport. Auckland's port handled 31 per cent of the country's container trade in 2015.

The face of urban Auckland changed when the government's immigration policy began allowing immigrants from Asia in 1986. This has led to Auckland becoming a multicultural city, with people of all ethnic backgrounds. According to the 1961 census data, Māori and Pacific Islanders made up five per cent of Auckland's population; Asians less than one per cent. The city became home to the world's largest Polynesian population by the 1990s. By 2006, the Asian population had reached 18.0 per cent in Auckland, and 36.2 per cent in the central city. New arrivals from Hong Kong, Taiwan and Korea gave a distinctive character to the areas where they clustered, while a range of other immigrants introduced mosques, Hindu temples, Buddhist temples, halal and kosher butchers and ethnic restaurants to the suburbs.

== Geography ==
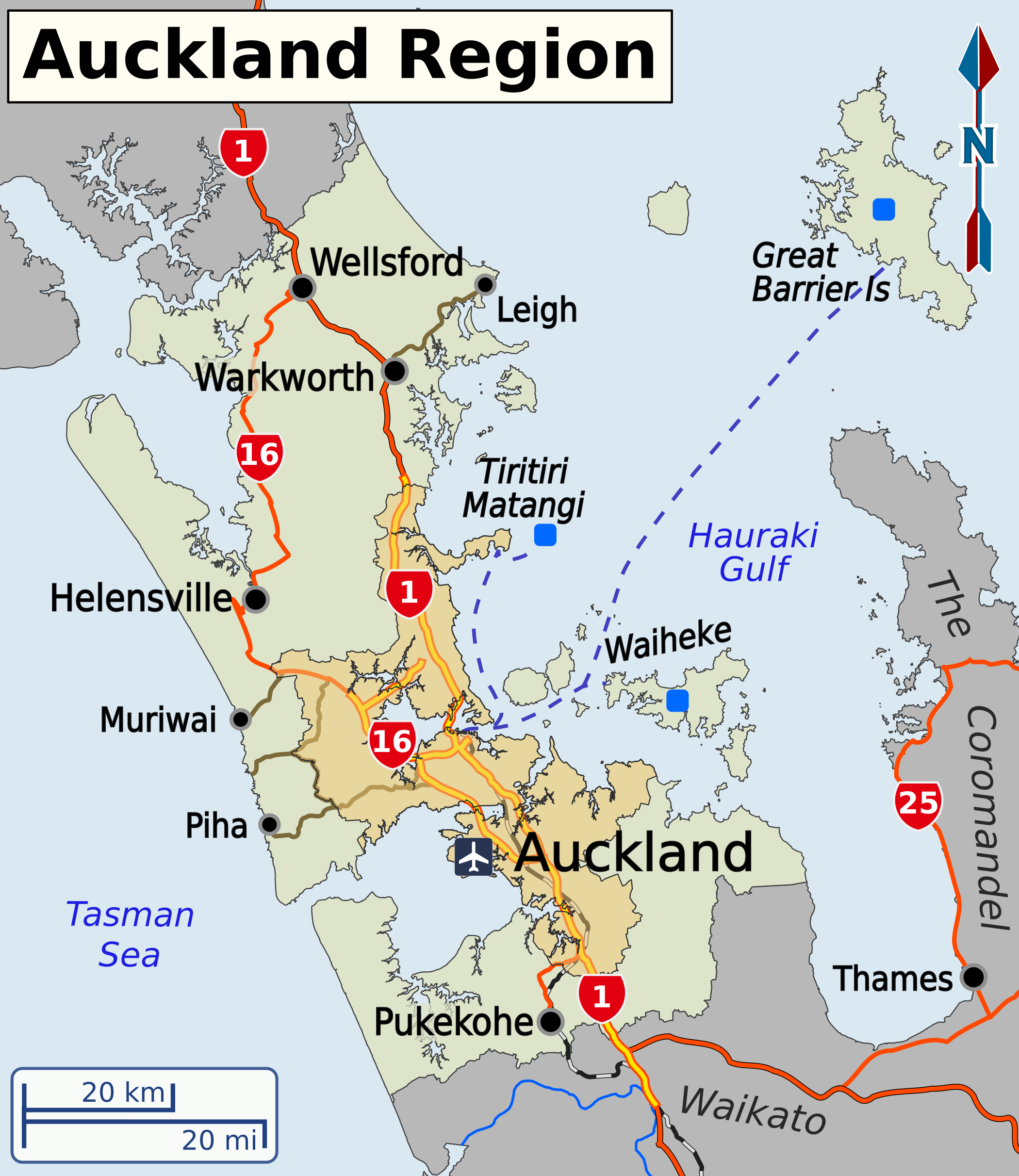
Map of the Auckland Region showing major transport routes

=== Scope ===
The boundaries of Auckland are imprecisely defined. The Auckland urban area, as it is defined by Statistics New Zealand under the Statistical Standard for Geographic Areas 2018 (SSGA18), spans 607.07 square kilometres (234.39 sq mi) and extends to Long Bay in the north, Swanson in the north-west, and Runciman in the south. Auckland's functional urban area (commuting zone) extends from just south of Warkworth in the north to Meremere in the south, incorporating the Hibiscus Coast in the northeast, Helensville, Parakai, Muriwai, Waimauku, Kumeū-Huapai, and Riverhead in the northwest, Beachlands-Pine Harbour and Maraetai in the east, and Pukekohe, Clarks Beach, Patumāhoe, Waiuku, Tuakau and Pōkeno (the latter two in the Waikato region) in the south. Auckland forms New Zealand's largest urban area.

The Auckland urban area lies within the Auckland Region, an administrative region that takes its name from the city. The region encompasses the city centre, as well as suburbs, surrounding towns, nearshore islands, and rural areas north and south of the urban area.

The Auckland central business district is the most built-up area of the region. The CBD covers 433 hectares (1,070 acres) in a triangular area, and is bounded by the Auckland waterfront on the Waitematā Harbour and the inner-city suburbs of Ponsonby, Newton and Parnell.

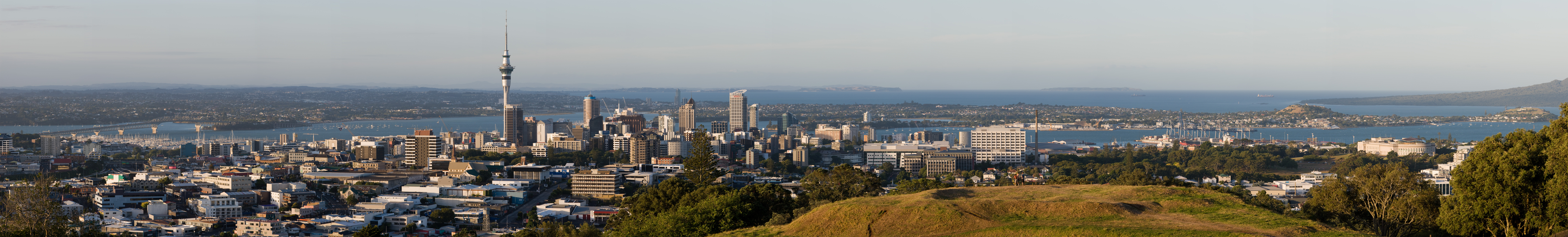
Auckland cityscape viewed from Maungawhau / Mount Eden. The nearer body of water is the Waitematā Harbour and the further one is the Hauraki Gulf.

=== Harbours and gulf ===
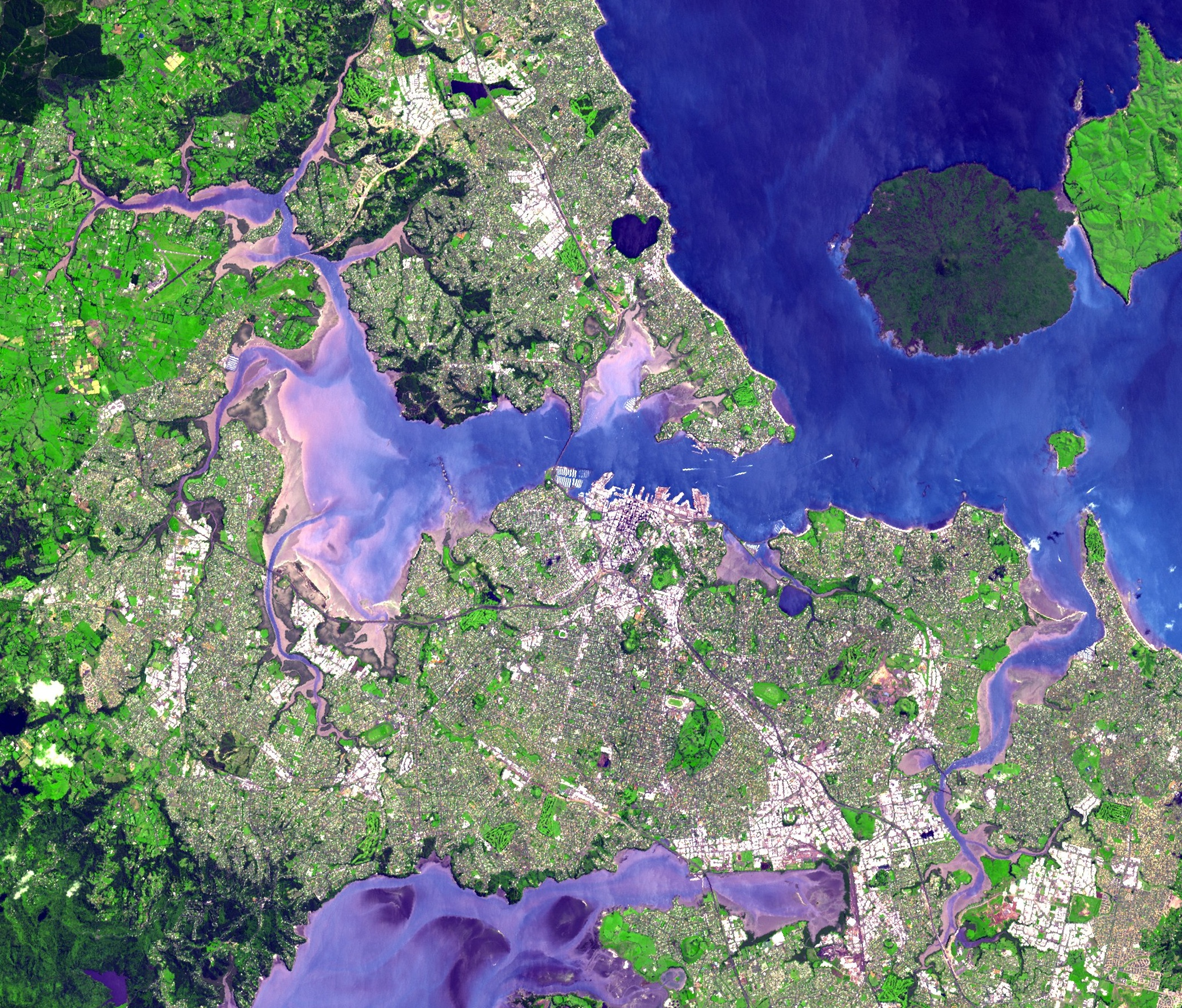
Satellite view of the Auckland isthmus with Manukau (lower) and Waitematā (upper) Harbours

The central areas of the city are located on the Auckland isthmus, less than two kilometres wide at its narrowest point, between Māngere Inlet and the Tāmaki River. There are two harbours surrounding this isthmus: Waitematā Harbour to the north, which extends east to the Hauraki Gulf and thence to the Pacific Ocean, and Manukau Harbour to the south, which opens west to the Tasman Sea.

Bridges span parts of both harbours, notably the Auckland Harbour Bridge crossing the Waitematā Harbour west of the central business district. The Māngere Bridge and the Upper Harbour Bridge span the upper reaches of the Manukau and Waitematā Harbours, respectively. In earlier times, portages crossed the narrowest sections of the isthmus.

Several islands of the Hauraki Gulf are administered as part of the Auckland Region, though they are not part of the Auckland urban area. Parts of Waiheke Island effectively function as Auckland suburbs, while various smaller islands near Auckland are mostly zoned 'recreational open space' or are nature sanctuaries.

=== Climate ===
Under the Köppen climate classification, Auckland has an oceanic climate (Köppen climate classification Cfb). However, under the Trewartha climate classification and according to the National Institute of Water and Atmospheric Research (NIWA), the city's climate is classified as humid subtropical climate with warm summers and mild winters (Trewartha climate classification Cfbl). It is the warmest main centre of New Zealand.

Snowfall is extremely rare: the most significant fall since the start of the 20th century was on 27 July 1939, when snow fell just before dawn and five centimetres (2 in) of snow reportedly lay on Mount Eden. Snowflakes were also seen on 28 July 1930 and 15 August 2011.

Frosts in Auckland are infrequent and often localised. Henderson Riverpark receives an annual average of 27.4 ground frosts per year, while Auckland Airport receives an annual average of 8.7 ground frosts per year.

Average sea temperature around Auckland varies throughout the year. The water temperature is warmest in February when it averages 21 °C (70 °F), while in August, the water temperature is at its coolest, averaging 14 °C (57 °F).

Prevailing winds in Auckland are predominantly from the southwest. The mean annual wind speed for Auckland Airport is 18 kilometres per hour (11 mph). During the summer months there is often a sea breeze in Auckland which starts in the morning and dies down again in the evening. The early morning calm on the isthmus during settled weather, before the sea breeze rises, was described as early as 1853: "In all seasons, the beauty of the day is in the early morning. At that time, generally, a solemn stillness holds, and a perfect calm prevails...".

Fog is a common occurrence for Auckland, especially in autumn and winter. Whenuapai Airport experiences an average of 44 fog days per year.

Auckland occasionally suffers from air pollution due to fine particle emissions. There are also occasional breaches of guideline levels of carbon monoxide. While maritime winds normally disperse the pollution relatively quickly it can sometimes become visible as smog, especially on calm winter days.

The record low temperature is −5.7 °C (21.7 °F) recorded at Riverhead Forest in June 1936, while the maximum recorded temperature is 34.0 °C (93.2 °F) on 12 February 2009. The record lowest daily maximum is 8.0 °C (46.4 °F) recorded on both 13 June 1976 and 16 August 2011. The record highest daily minimum is 23.6 °C (74.5 °F) on 12 February 2022. The record highest dew point is 25.0 °C (77.0 °F) recorded on 10 March 1972. The most humid month on record was January 2018 with an average dew point of 18.0 °C (64.4 °F). The warmest month on record was February 1990 with an average mean temperature of 22.1 °C (71.8 °F).

Climate data for Auckland Airport (17 km (11 mi) S of Auckland, 7 m (23 ft) ASL, 1991–2020 normals, extremes 1962–present)
Month	Jan	Feb	Mar	Apr	May	Jun	Jul	Aug	Sep	Oct	Nov	Dec	Year
Record high °C (°F)	30.0 (86.0)	30.5 (86.9)	29.8 (85.6)	26.5 (79.7)	24.6 (76.3)	23.8 (74.8)	20.8 (69.4)	21.0 (69.8)	23.0 (73.4)	23.6 (74.5)	25.9 (78.6)	28.3 (82.9)	30.5 (86.9)
Mean maximum °C (°F)	27.4 (81.3)	27.8 (82.0)	26.0 (78.8)	24.0 (75.2)	21.2 (70.2)	18.9 (66.0)	17.7 (63.9)	18.2 (64.8)	19.9 (67.8)	21.3 (70.3)	23.3 (73.9)	25.8 (78.4)	28.3 (82.9)
Mean daily maximum °C (°F)	23.9 (75.0)	24.4 (75.9)	22.9 (73.2)	20.4 (68.7)	17.7 (63.9)	15.5 (59.9)	14.6 (58.3)	15.2 (59.4)	16.5 (61.7)	17.9 (64.2)	19.6 (67.3)	22.0 (71.6)	19.2 (66.6)
Daily mean °C (°F)	20.0 (68.0)	20.5 (68.9)	18.9 (66.0)	16.6 (61.9)	14.2 (57.6)	12.1 (53.8)	11.2 (52.2)	11.7 (53.1)	13.1 (55.6)	14.6 (58.3)	16.2 (61.2)	18.5 (65.3)	15.6 (60.1)
Mean daily minimum °C (°F)	16.1 (61.0)	16.6 (61.9)	14.9 (58.8)	12.8 (55.0)	10.8 (51.4)	8.7 (47.7)	7.7 (45.9)	8.3 (46.9)	9.7 (49.5)	11.3 (52.3)	12.8 (55.0)	15.0 (59.0)	12.1 (53.8)
Mean minimum °C (°F)	11.6 (52.9)	12.4 (54.3)	10.6 (51.1)	7.4 (45.3)	4.9 (40.8)	2.6 (36.7)	2.0 (35.6)	3.2 (37.8)	4.6 (40.3)	6.7 (44.1)	8.3 (46.9)	10.5 (50.9)	1.5 (34.7)
Record low °C (°F)	5.6 (42.1)	8.7 (47.7)	6.6 (43.9)	3.9 (39.0)	0.9 (33.6)	−1.1 (30.0)	−3.9 (25.0)	−1.7 (28.9)	1.7 (35.1)	−0.6 (30.9)	4.4 (39.9)	7.0 (44.6)	−3.9 (25.0)
Average rainfall mm (inches)	58.1 (2.29)	63.1 (2.48)	75.0 (2.95)	87.1 (3.43)	119.8 (4.72)	119.4 (4.70)	136.9 (5.39)	117.2 (4.61)	100.1 (3.94)	91.6 (3.61)	68.9 (2.71)	81.7 (3.22)	1,118.9 (44.05)
Average rainy days (≥ 1.0 mm)	6.8	6.5	7.7	9.6	13.0	14.3	15.2	14.7	12.5	11.5	9.3	9.0	130.1
Average relative humidity (%)	76.8	80.1	82.1	83.1	86.5	87.7	87.7	85.0	80.7	79.7	76.1	76.6	81.8
Average dew point °C (°F)	14.8 (58.6)	15.4 (59.7)	14.2 (57.6)	12.7 (54.9)	11.2 (52.2)	9.4 (48.9)	8.4 (47.1)	8.6 (47.5)	9.5 (49.1)	10.5 (50.9)	11.6 (52.9)	13.7 (56.7)	11.7 (53.0)
Mean monthly sunshine hours	240.3	203.4	200.8	169.3	149.1	126.1	133.9	153.7	159.0	180.5	203.8	201.9	2,121.8
Mean daily daylight hours	14.4	13.5	12.3	11.1	10.2	9.7	9.9	10.8	11.9	13.0	14.1	14.6	12.1
Percentage possible sunshine	54	53	53	51	47	43	44	46	45	45	48	45	48
Average ultraviolet index	12	11	8	5	3	2	2	3	5	7	10	12	7
Source 1: NIWA Climate Data
Source 2: MetService Weather Spark

Climate data for Henderson North (13 km (8.1 mi) W of Auckland, 7 m (23 ft) ASL, 1991–2020 normals, extremes 1985–present)
Month	Jan	Feb	Mar	Apr	May	Jun	Jul	Aug	Sep	Oct	Nov	Dec	Year
Record high °C (°F)	31.8 (89.2)	34.0 (93.2)	30.1 (86.2)	29.4 (84.9)	24.1 (75.4)	24.5 (76.1)	20.9 (69.6)	25.5 (77.9)	27.0 (80.6)	26.0 (78.8)	28.4 (83.1)	30.8 (87.4)	34.0 (93.2)
Mean maximum °C (°F)	29.3 (84.7)	29.3 (84.7)	27.8 (82.0)	25.9 (78.6)	22.4 (72.3)	19.7 (67.5)	18.7 (65.7)	19.6 (67.3)	21.4 (70.5)	23.5 (74.3)	25.4 (77.7)	27.8 (82.0)	30.1 (86.2)
Mean daily maximum °C (°F)	25.5 (77.9)	25.9 (78.6)	24.2 (75.6)	21.5 (70.7)	18.7 (65.7)	16.2 (61.2)	15.5 (59.9)	16.3 (61.3)	17.9 (64.2)	19.4 (66.9)	21.3 (70.3)	23.5 (74.3)	20.5 (68.9)
Daily mean °C (°F)	19.9 (67.8)	20.3 (68.5)	18.6 (65.5)	16.2 (61.2)	13.8 (56.8)	11.5 (52.7)	10.6 (51.1)	11.3 (52.3)	12.9 (55.2)	14.5 (58.1)	16.2 (61.2)	18.5 (65.3)	15.4 (59.6)
Mean daily minimum °C (°F)	14.4 (57.9)	14.8 (58.6)	13.0 (55.4)	10.9 (51.6)	8.9 (48.0)	6.8 (44.2)	5.6 (42.1)	6.3 (43.3)	7.9 (46.2)	9.6 (49.3)	11.2 (52.2)	13.4 (56.1)	10.2 (50.4)
Mean minimum °C (°F)	8.8 (47.8)	9.5 (49.1)	7.4 (45.3)	4.3 (39.7)	1.9 (35.4)	−0.4 (31.3)	−1.4 (29.5)	0.0 (32.0)	1.3 (34.3)	3.5 (38.3)	5.2 (41.4)	7.6 (45.7)	−2.0 (28.4)
Record low °C (°F)	5.6 (42.1)	4.9 (40.8)	2.3 (36.1)	−1.0 (30.2)	−2.3 (27.9)	−4.3 (24.3)	−4.1 (24.6)	−2.3 (27.9)	−1.5 (29.3)	0.2 (32.4)	2.5 (36.5)	4.4 (39.9)	−4.3 (24.3)
Average rainfall mm (inches)	70.7 (2.78)	74.1 (2.92)	90.7 (3.57)	110.4 (4.35)	140.3 (5.52)	158.5 (6.24)	178.3 (7.02)	151.5 (5.96)	133.0 (5.24)	103.8 (4.09)	88.7 (3.49)	99.4 (3.91)	1,399.4 (55.09)
Source: NIWA

Climate data for Ardmore Airport (27 km (17 mi) SE of Auckland, 41 m (135 ft) ASL, 1991–2020 normals, extremes 1969–present)
Month	Jan	Feb	Mar	Apr	May	Jun	Jul	Aug	Sep	Oct	Nov	Dec	Year
Record high °C (°F)	31.5 (88.7)	31.2 (88.2)	30.0 (86.0)	27.6 (81.7)	24.1 (75.4)	22.9 (73.2)	19.8 (67.6)	21.9 (71.4)	22.0 (71.6)	24.2 (75.6)	28.0 (82.4)	32.8 (91.0)	32.8 (91.0)
Mean maximum °C (°F)	28.3 (82.9)	28.5 (83.3)	27.2 (81.0)	24.9 (76.8)	21.7 (71.1)	19.5 (67.1)	18.2 (64.8)	18.3 (64.9)	20.1 (68.2)	21.7 (71.1)	24.0 (75.2)	26.7 (80.1)	29.1 (84.4)
Mean daily maximum °C (°F)	24.8 (76.6)	25.4 (77.7)	23.8 (74.8)	21.1 (70.0)	18.4 (65.1)	15.9 (60.6)	15.2 (59.4)	15.7 (60.3)	17.1 (62.8)	18.5 (65.3)	20.4 (68.7)	22.8 (73.0)	19.9 (67.9)
Daily mean °C (°F)	19.0 (66.2)	19.5 (67.1)	17.8 (64.0)	15.5 (59.9)	13.3 (55.9)	11.1 (52.0)	10.3 (50.5)	10.7 (51.3)	12.3 (54.1)	13.8 (56.8)	15.4 (59.7)	17.7 (63.9)	14.7 (58.5)
Mean daily minimum °C (°F)	13.2 (55.8)	13.6 (56.5)	11.8 (53.2)	9.9 (49.8)	8.1 (46.6)	6.2 (43.2)	5.4 (41.7)	5.7 (42.3)	7.5 (45.5)	9.1 (48.4)	10.3 (50.5)	12.6 (54.7)	9.5 (49.0)
Mean minimum °C (°F)	7.6 (45.7)	7.6 (45.7)	5.8 (42.4)	2.9 (37.2)	1.1 (34.0)	−1.1 (30.0)	−1.5 (29.3)	0.0 (32.0)	1.3 (34.3)	3.2 (37.8)	4.2 (39.6)	6.6 (43.9)	−2.3 (27.9)
Record low °C (°F)	5.1 (41.2)	3.8 (38.8)	0.6 (33.1)	−1.5 (29.3)	−2.9 (26.8)	−4.0 (24.8)	−4.0 (24.8)	−3.5 (25.7)	−1.9 (28.6)	−1.5 (29.3)	1.1 (34.0)	3.4 (38.1)	−4.0 (24.8)
Average rainfall mm (inches)	68.2 (2.69)	66.6 (2.62)	80.3 (3.16)	105.4 (4.15)	123.9 (4.88)	140.4 (5.53)	144.0 (5.67)	136.5 (5.37)	113.8 (4.48)	101.7 (4.00)	88.6 (3.49)	90.4 (3.56)	1,259.8 (49.6)
Source: NIWA (rain 1990–2016)

Climate data for North Shore (Albany) (12 km (7.5 mi) N of Auckland, 64 m (210 ft) ASL, 1991–2020 normals)
Month	Jan	Feb	Mar	Apr	May	Jun	Jul	Aug	Sep	Oct	Nov	Dec	Year
Mean daily maximum °C (°F)	23.3 (73.9)	23.8 (74.8)	22.4 (72.3)	20.2 (68.4)	17.9 (64.2)	15.5 (59.9)	14.5 (58.1)	15.1 (59.2)	16.3 (61.3)	17.7 (63.9)	19.4 (66.9)	21.3 (70.3)	19.0 (66.1)
Daily mean °C (°F)	19.1 (66.4)	19.8 (67.6)	18.2 (64.8)	16.0 (60.8)	13.8 (56.8)	11.8 (53.2)	10.6 (51.1)	11.2 (52.2)	12.6 (54.7)	13.8 (56.8)	15.4 (59.7)	17.4 (63.3)	15.0 (59.0)
Mean daily minimum °C (°F)	15.0 (59.0)	15.7 (60.3)	14.0 (57.2)	11.8 (53.2)	9.8 (49.6)	8.0 (46.4)	6.6 (43.9)	7.2 (45.0)	8.8 (47.8)	9.9 (49.8)	11.3 (52.3)	13.5 (56.3)	11.0 (51.7)
Average rainfall mm (inches)	67.0 (2.64)	65.4 (2.57)	87.5 (3.44)	92.6 (3.65)	118.0 (4.65)	134.0 (5.28)	145.4 (5.72)	125.9 (4.96)	106.4 (4.19)	88.8 (3.50)	70.9 (2.79)	87.5 (3.44)	1,189.4 (46.83)
Mean monthly sunshine hours	268.6	229.1	217.9	180.5	156.7	127.8	148.3	151.7	174.3	208.0	233.6	248.7	2,345.2
Source: NIWA

=== Volcanoes ===
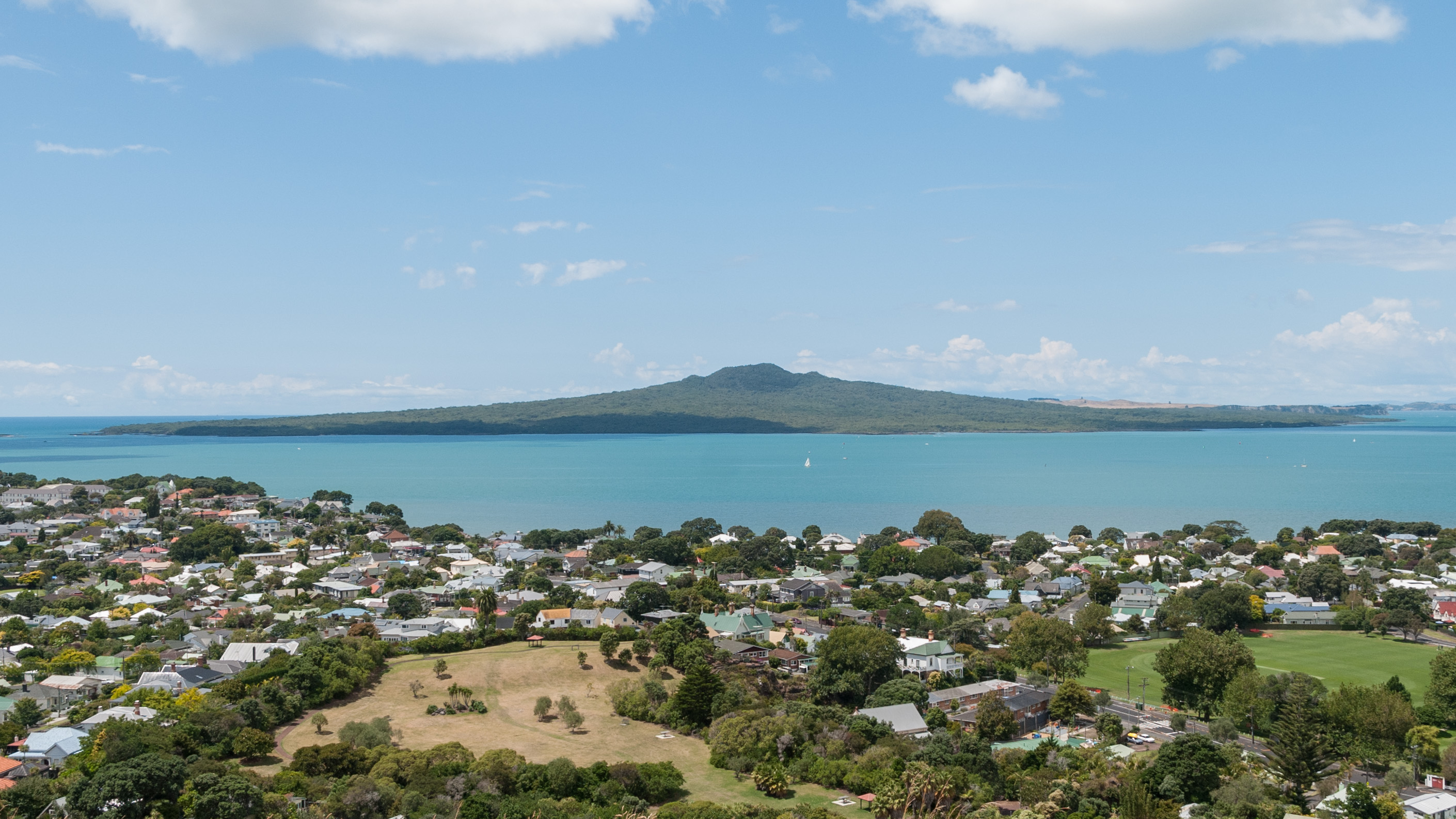
The volcanic Rangitoto Island in the Hauraki Gulf, with the remnant of Takaroro / Mount Cambria in the foreground (yellow, grassy reserve). Viewed from Takarunga / Mount Victoria over Devonport.

The city of Auckland straddles the Auckland Volcanic Field, an area which in the past, produced at least 53 small volcanic centres over the last ~193,000 years, represented by a range of surface features including maars (explosion craters), tuff rings, scoria cones, and lava flows. It is fed entirely by basaltic magma sourced from the mantle at a depth of 70–90 km below the city, and is unrelated to the explosive, subduction-driven volcanism of the Taupō Volcanic Zone in the Central North Island region of Aotearoa, New Zealand, ~250 km away. The Auckland Volcanic Field is considered to be a monogenetic volcanic field, with each volcano erupting only a single time, usually over a timeframe of weeks to years before cessation of activity. Future eruptive activity remains a threat to the city, and will likely occur at a new, unknown location within the field. The most recent activity occurred approximately 1450 AD at the Rangitoto Volcano. This event was witnessed by Māori occupants of the area, making it the only eruption within the Auckland Volcanic Field thus far to have been observed by humans.

The Auckland Volcanic Field has contributed greatly to the growth and prosperity of the Auckland Region since the area was settled by humans. Initially, the maunga (scoria cones) were occupied and established as pā (fortified settlements) by Māori due to the strategic advantage their elevation provided in controlling resources and key portages between the Waitematā and Manukau harbours. The rich volcanic soils found in these areas also proved ideal for the cultivation of crops, such as kūmara. Following European arrival, many of the maunga were transformed into quarries to supply the growing city with aggregate and building materials, and as a result were severely damaged or entirely destroyed. A number of the smaller maar craters and tuff rings were also removed during earthworks. Most of the remaining volcanic centres are now preserved within recreational reserves administered by Auckland Council, the Department of Conservation, and the Tūpuna Maunga o Tāmaki Makaurau Authority.

== Demographics ==
Auckland population pyramid in 2022

The Auckland urban area, as defined by Statistics New Zealand, covers 605.67 km^{2} (233.85 sq mi). The urban area has an estimated population of 1,547,200 as of June 2025, 29.1 percent of New Zealand's population. The city has a population larger than the entire South Island (1,256,700).

Historical population
Year	Pop.	±% p.a.
2013	1,223,541	—
2018	1,345,833	+1.92%
2023	1,402,275	+0.83%

The urban area had a population of 1,402,275 in the 2023 New Zealand census, an increase of 56,442 people (4.2%) since the 2018 census, and an increase of 178,734 people (14.6%) since the 2013 census. There were 692,490 males, 704,607 females and 5,178 people of other genders in 454,239 dwellings. 4.9% of people identified as LGBTIQ+. The median age was 35.1 years (compared with 38.1 years nationally). There were 270,384 people (19.3%) aged under 15 years, 307,065 (21.9%) aged 15 to 29, 651,645 (46.5%) aged 30 to 64, and 173,178 (12.3%) aged 65 or older.

Of those at least 15 years old, 290,814 (25.7%) people had a bachelor's or higher degree, 464,022 (41.0%) had a post-high school certificate or diploma, and 298,851 (26.4%) people exclusively held high school qualifications. The median income was $44,600, compared with $41,500 nationally. 160,164 people (14.2%) earned over $100,000 compared to 12.1% nationally. The employment status of those at least 15 was that 605,601 (53.5%) people were employed full-time, 132,180 (11.7%) were part-time, and 39,441 (3.5%) were unemployed.

=== Culture and identity ===
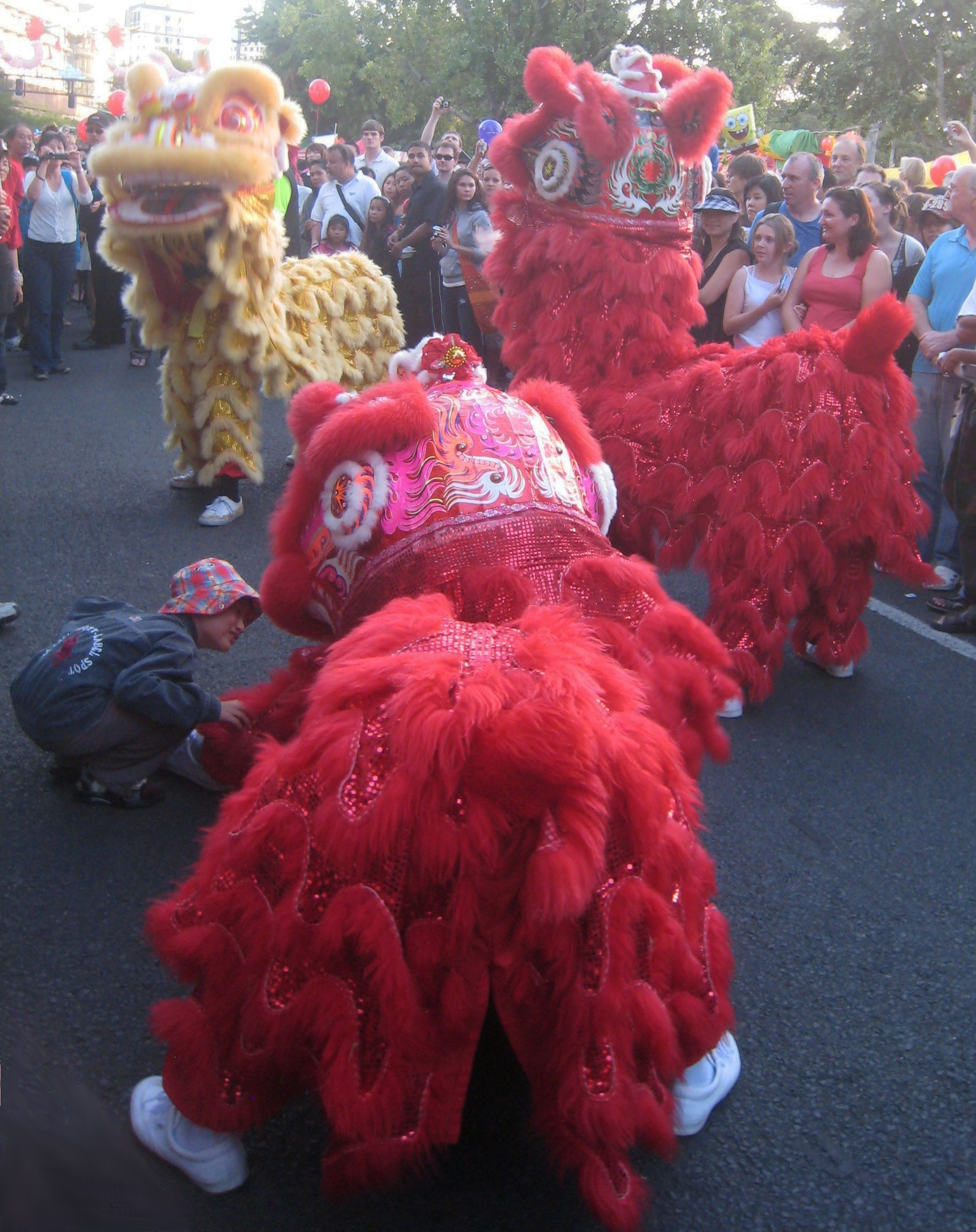
Asians are Auckland's fastest growing ethnic group. Here, lion dancers perform at the Auckland Lantern Festival.

Many ethnic groups, since the late 20th century, have had an increasing presence in Auckland, making it by far the country's most cosmopolitan city. Historically, Auckland's population has been of majority European origin, though the proportion of those of Asian or other non-European origins has increased in recent decades due to the removal of restrictions directly or indirectly based on race. Europeans continue to make up the plurality of the city's population, but no longer constitute a majority after decreasing in proportion from 54.6% to 48.1% between the 2013 and 2018 censuses. Asians now form the second-largest ethnic group, making up nearly one-third of the population. Auckland is home to the largest ethnic Polynesian population of any city in the world, with a sizeable population of Pacific Islanders (Pasifika) and indigenous Māori people.

In the 2023 census, where people could identify as more than one ethnicity, the results were 44.0% European (Pākehā); 12.2% Māori; 18.7% Pasifika; 34.9% Asian; 2.9% Middle Eastern, Latin American and African New Zealanders (MELAA); and 1.7% other, which includes people giving their ethnicity as "New Zealander". English was spoken by 91.5%, Māori language by 2.7%, Samoan by 5.3% and other languages by 32.0%. No language could be spoken by 2.4% (e.g. too young to talk). New Zealand Sign Language was known by 0.4%. The percentage of people born overseas was 44.9%, compared with 28.8% nationally.

At the 2023 census the Pasifika population formed the majority in the Māngere-Ōtāhuhu local board area and the plurality in the Ōtara-Papatoetoe and Manurewa local board areas. The Asian population formed the majority in the Howick and Puketāpapa local board areas and the plurality in the Whau local board area. Europeans formed the plurality in the Henderson-Massey, Maungakiekie-Tāmaki and Papakura local board areas, and formed the majority in the remaining 11 local board areas. Māori did not form a majority or plurality in any local board area but are in the highest concentrations in the Manurewa and Papakura local board areas.

Immigration to New Zealand is heavily concentrated towards Auckland (partly for job market reasons). This strong focus on Auckland has led the immigration services to award extra points towards immigration visa requirements for people intending to move to other parts of New Zealand. Immigration from overseas into Auckland is partially offset by the net emigration of people from Auckland to other regions of New Zealand. In 2021 and 2022, Auckland recorded its only decreases in population, primarily due to the COVID-19 pandemic and the associated lack of international migration.

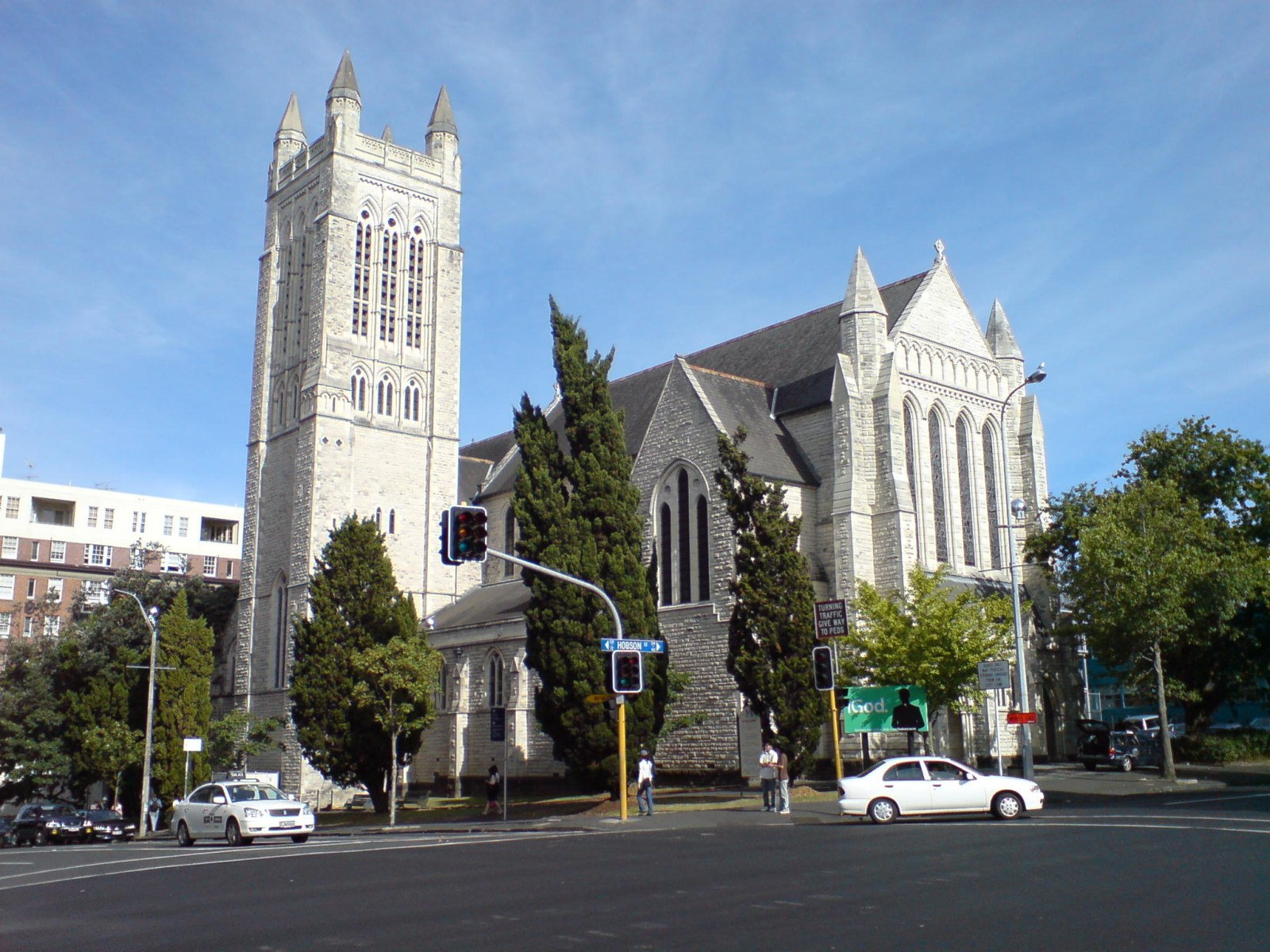
St Matthew-in-the-City, a historic Anglican church in the Auckland CBD

At the 2018 Census, in the local board areas of Upper Harbour, Waitematā, Puketāpapa and Howick, overseas-born residents outnumbered those born in New Zealand. The most common birthplaces of overseas-born residents were mainland China (6.2%), India (4.6%), England (4.4%), Fiji (2.9%), Samoa (2.5%), South Africa (2.4%), Philippines (2.0%), Australia (1.4%), South Korea (1.4%), and Tonga (1.3%). A study from 2016 showed Auckland has the fourth largest foreign-born population in the world, only behind Dubai, Toronto and Brussels, with 39% of its residents born overseas.

=== Religion ===
Religious affiliations in the 2023 census were 35.7% Christian, 6.1% Hindu, 3.3% Islam, 0.9% Māori religious beliefs, 2.1% Buddhist, 0.3% New Age, 0.2% Jewish, and 2.8% other religions. People who answered that they had no religion were 42.7%, and 6.0% of people did not answer the census question. In 2007, immigration from Asia has added to the religious diversity of the city, increasing the number of people affiliating with Buddhism, Hinduism, Islam and Sikhism, although there are no figures on religious attendance. There is also a small, long-established Jewish community.

=== Future growth ===
Auckland is experiencing substantial population growth via immigration (two-thirds of growth) and natural population increases (one-third), and is set to grow to an estimated 1.9 million inhabitants by 2031 in a medium-variant scenario. This substantial increase in population will have a huge impact on transport, housing and other infrastructure, particularly housing, which are considered to be under pressure already. The high-variant scenario shows the region's population growing to over two million by 2031.

In July 2016, Auckland Council released, as the outcome of a three-year study and public hearings, its Unitary Plan for Auckland. The plan aims to free up to 30 percent more land for housing and allows for greater intensification of the existing urban area, creating 422,000 new dwellings in the next 30 years.

== Government ==
=== Local ===
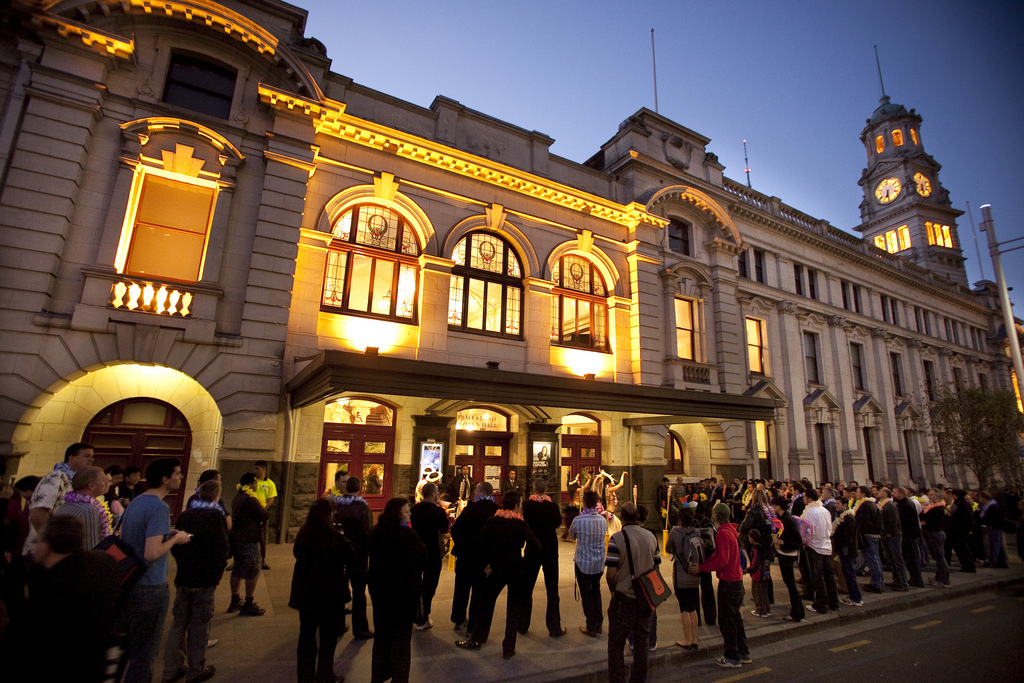
Auckland Town Hall entrance on Queen Street

In 1851, Auckland was constituted as an independent borough, the first in the country. The borough was 58,000 acres (23,000 ha) in size and went as far west as the Whau River and as far east as Howick. The large boundary included 4,000 Europeans in the urban areas; 2,500 in the Fencible settlements; and 1,500 in the rural parts. An inability to collect rates and a divide between urban and rural interests led to the borough becoming defunct in 1852. In 1854, the Auckland Provincial Council established Auckland City under the Auckland City Council Act. This city had boundaries equivalent to the City of Auckland electorate. The legality of this city was challenged and it was later dissolved in March 1855 before finally being repealed by an act in April 1856. An Auckland Harbour Board was also established and repealed during the same period. In 1863, the Town of Auckland was incorporated within the same boundaries of the East Town, Middle Town, and West Town wards of the borough. On 24 April 1871, Auckland became a city under The Municipal Corporations Act, 1867.

The Auckland Council is the local authority with jurisdiction over the city of Auckland, along with surrounding rural areas, parkland, and the islands of the Hauraki Gulf.

From 1989 to 2010, Auckland was governed by several city and district councils, with regional oversight by Auckland Regional Council.

A Royal Commission on Auckland Governance was set up in 2007; in 2009, it recommended a unified local governance structure for Auckland by amalgamating the councils. The government subsequently announced that a "super city" would be set up with a single mayor by the time of New Zealand's local body elections in 2010.

In October 2010, Manukau City mayor Len Brown was elected mayor of the amalgamated Auckland Council. He was re-elected for a second term in October 2013. Brown did not stand for re-election in the 2016 mayoral election, and was succeeded by successful candidate Phil Goff in October 2016. Twenty councillors make up the remainder of the Auckland Council governing body, elected from thirteen electoral wards.

=== National ===
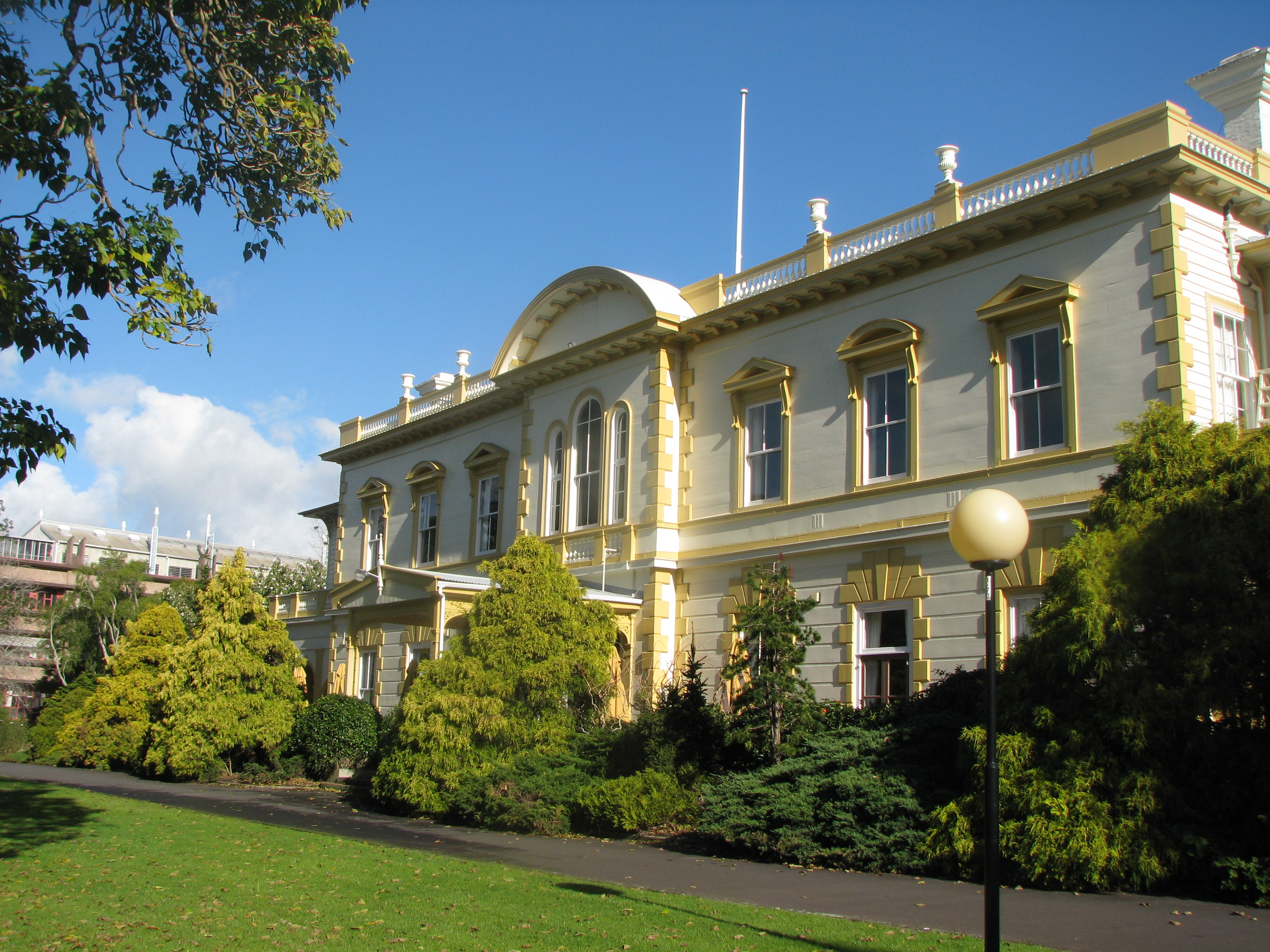
Old Government House, formerly the residence of the governor of New Zealand

Between 1842 and 1865, Auckland was the capital city of New Zealand. Parliament met in what is now Old Government House on the University of Auckland's City campus. The capital was moved to the more centrally located Wellington in 1865.

Auckland, due to its large population, is covered by 23 general electorates and three Māori electorates, each returning one member to the New Zealand House of Representatives. The National Party holds 14 general electorates, the Labour Party six, ACT two and the Greens one. Two of the three Māori electorates are held by Te Pāti Māori; the remaining Māori electorate is held by an independent.

== Economy ==
In 1891, the three main items exported from Auckland's port were: kauri gum, gold, and wool. These exports were collectively worth almost a million pounds.

Auckland is the major economic and financial centre of New Zealand. It has an advanced market economy with strengths in finance, commerce, and tourism. Most major international corporations have an Auckland office; the most expensive office space is around lower Queen Street and the Viaduct Basin in the Auckland CBD, where many financial and business services are located, which constitute a large percentage of the CBD economy. The largest commercial and industrial areas of the Auckland Region are Auckland CBD and the western parts of Manukau, mostly bordering the Manukau Harbour and the Tāmaki River estuary.

According to the 2013 census, the primary employment industries of Auckland residents are professional, scientific and technical services (11.4 percent), manufacturing (9.9 percent), retail trade (9.7 percent), health care and social assistance (9.1 percent), and education and training (8.3 percent). Manufacturing is the largest employer in the Henderson-Massey, Howick, Māngere-Ōtāhuhu, Ōtara-Papatoetoe, Manurewa and Papakura local board areas, retail trade is the largest employer in the Whau local board area, while professional, scientific and technical services are the largest employer in the remaining urban local board areas.

The GDP of Auckland in 2025 was estimated at $167 billion NZD, which saw a 2.1% increase from 2023. The per-capita GDP of Auckland was estimated at $91,960 at the end of 2025, the second-highest in the country after the Wellington region, and above the national average of $87,400.

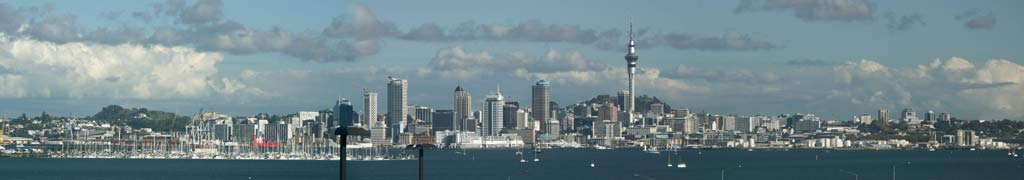
View of Auckland CBD from North Shore. The skyline is dominated by the Sky Tower.

== Architecture ==
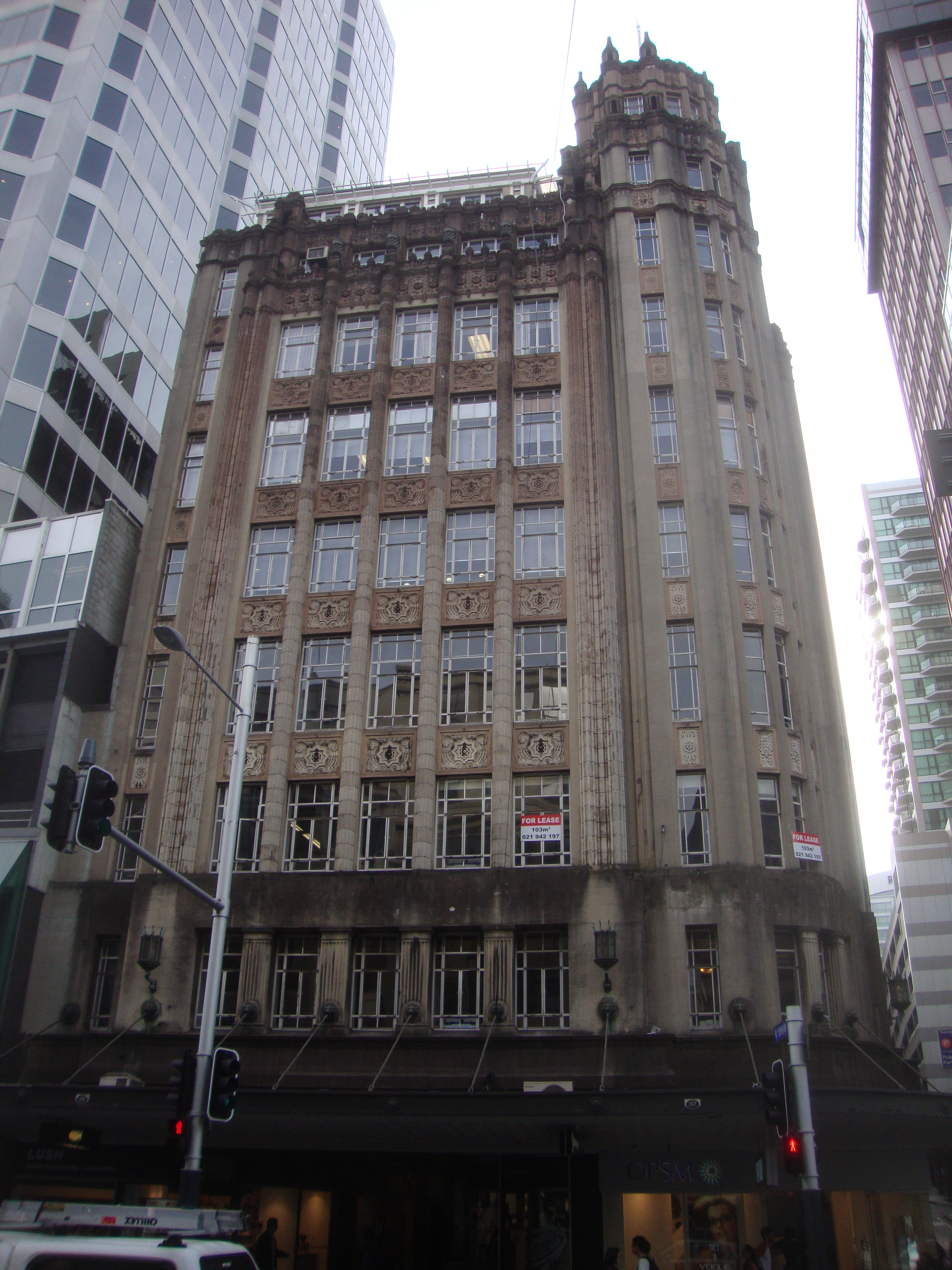
Landmark House

Auckland has a diversity of architectural styles, resulting from its early beginnings as a settlement, the Victorian period, the 20th century and through to the contemporary era of the 21st century. Legislation is in effect to protect the remaining heritage, with the key piece being the Resource Management Act of 1991. Prepared under this legislation is the Auckland Unitary Plan, which indicates how land can be used or developed. Prominent historic buildings in Auckland include the Dilworth Building, the Auckland Ferry Terminal, Guardian Trust Building, Old Customs House, Landmark House, the Auckland Town Hall and the Britomart Transport Centre – many of these are located on Queen Street, the main street.

=== Housing ===
Housing varies considerably, between suburbs that have state-owned housing in lower income neighbourhoods, to larger waterfront homes, especially in areas close to the Waitematā Harbour. Historically, the most common residence of Aucklanders was a standalone dwelling on a 'quarter acre' (1,000 m^{2}). However, subdividing such properties with 'infill housing' has long been the norm. Auckland's housing stock has become more diverse in recent decades, with many more apartments being built since the 1970s, particularly since the 1990s in the CBD. Nevertheless, the majority of Aucklanders live in single dwelling housing and are expected to continue to do so, even with most of future urban growth being through intensification.

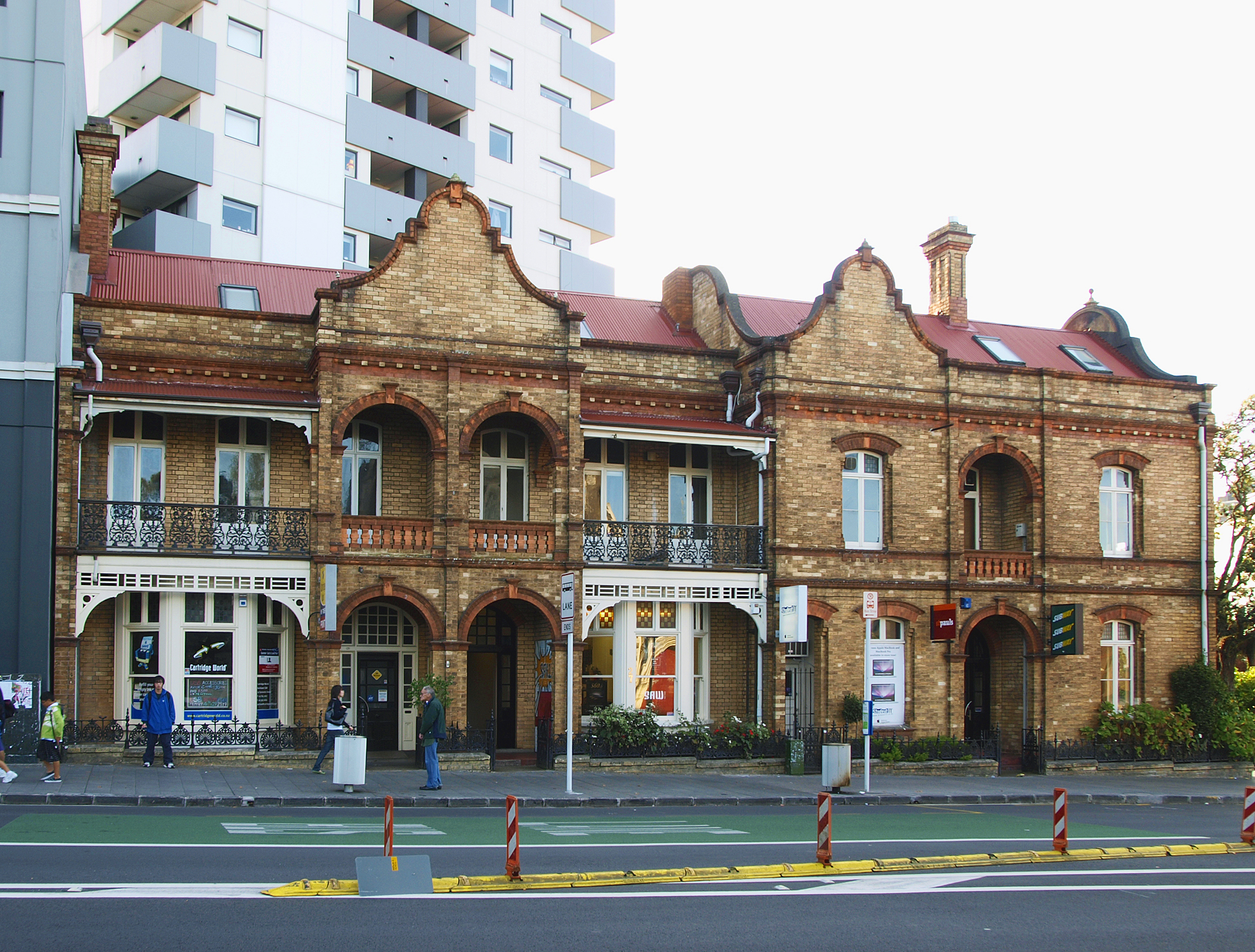
Terraced housing built in 1897 as residential buildings and associated place houses for John Endean

Auckland has been described as having "the most extensive range of timbered housing with its classical details and mouldings in the world", many of them built in the Victorian and Edwardian eras. In some areas, the Victorian villas have been torn down to make way for redevelopment. The demolition of the older houses is being combated through increased heritage protection for older parts of the city.

Auckland's housing is amongst the least affordable in the world, based on comparing average house prices with average household income levels and house prices have grown well above the rate of inflation in recent decades. In August 2022, the Real Estate Institute of New Zealand (REINZ) reported the median house price in the Auckland Region was $1,100,000, ranging from $900,000 in the former Papakura District area to $1,285,000 in the former North Shore City area, This is compared to a median price of $700,000 outside of Auckland. There is significant public debate around why Auckland's housing is so expensive, often referring to a lack of land supply, the easy availability of credit for residential investment and Auckland's high level of liveability.

In the lead-up to 2010, a housing crisis began in Auckland, with the market not being able to sustain the demand for affordable homes. The Housing Accords and Special Housing Areas Act 2013 mandated that a minimum of 10 percent of new builds in certain housing areas be subsidised to make them affordable for buyers who had incomes on par with the national average. In a new subdivision at Hobsonville Point, 20 percent of new homes were reduced to below $550,000. Some of the demand for new housing at this time was attributed to the 43,000 people who moved into Auckland between June 2014 and June 2015. Research has found that Auckland is set to become even more densely populated in future which could ease the burden by creating higher density housing in the city centre. From around November 2021 to May 2022, house prices dropped 11.68%. It has continued to fall since due to inflation, bank interest rates, and a variety of other factors.

== Culture and lifestyle ==
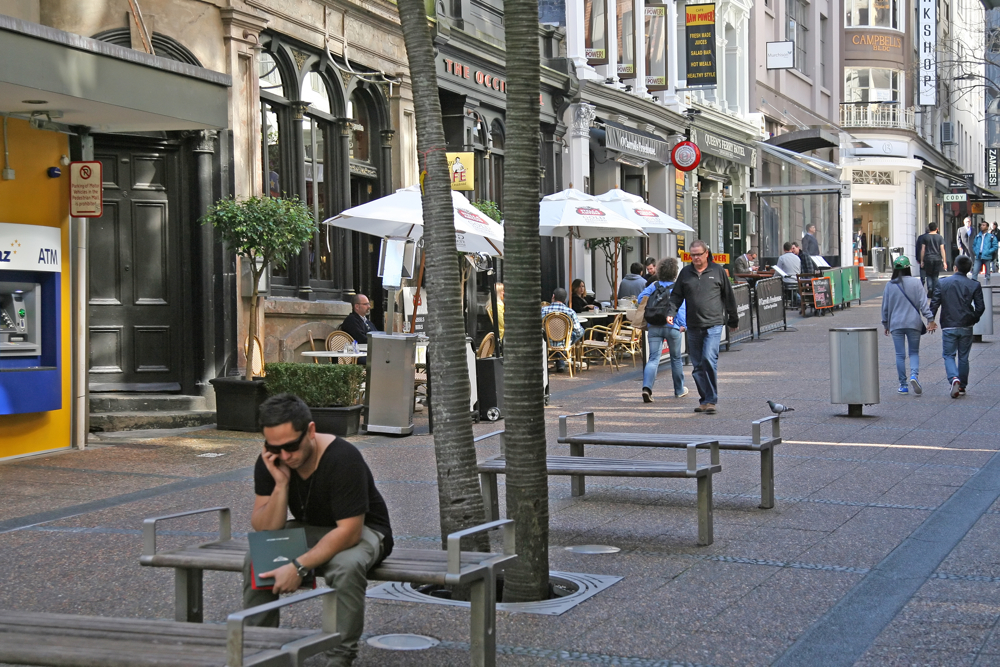
Pedestrians on Vulcan Lane in the CBD

Positive aspects of Auckland life are its mild climate, plentiful employment and educational opportunities, as well as numerous leisure facilities. Meanwhile, traffic problems, the lack of good public transport, and increasing housing costs have been cited by many Aucklanders as among the strongest negative factors of living there, together with crime that has been rising in recent years. Nonetheless, Auckland ranked third in a survey of the quality of life of 215 major cities of the world (2015 data).

=== Leisure ===
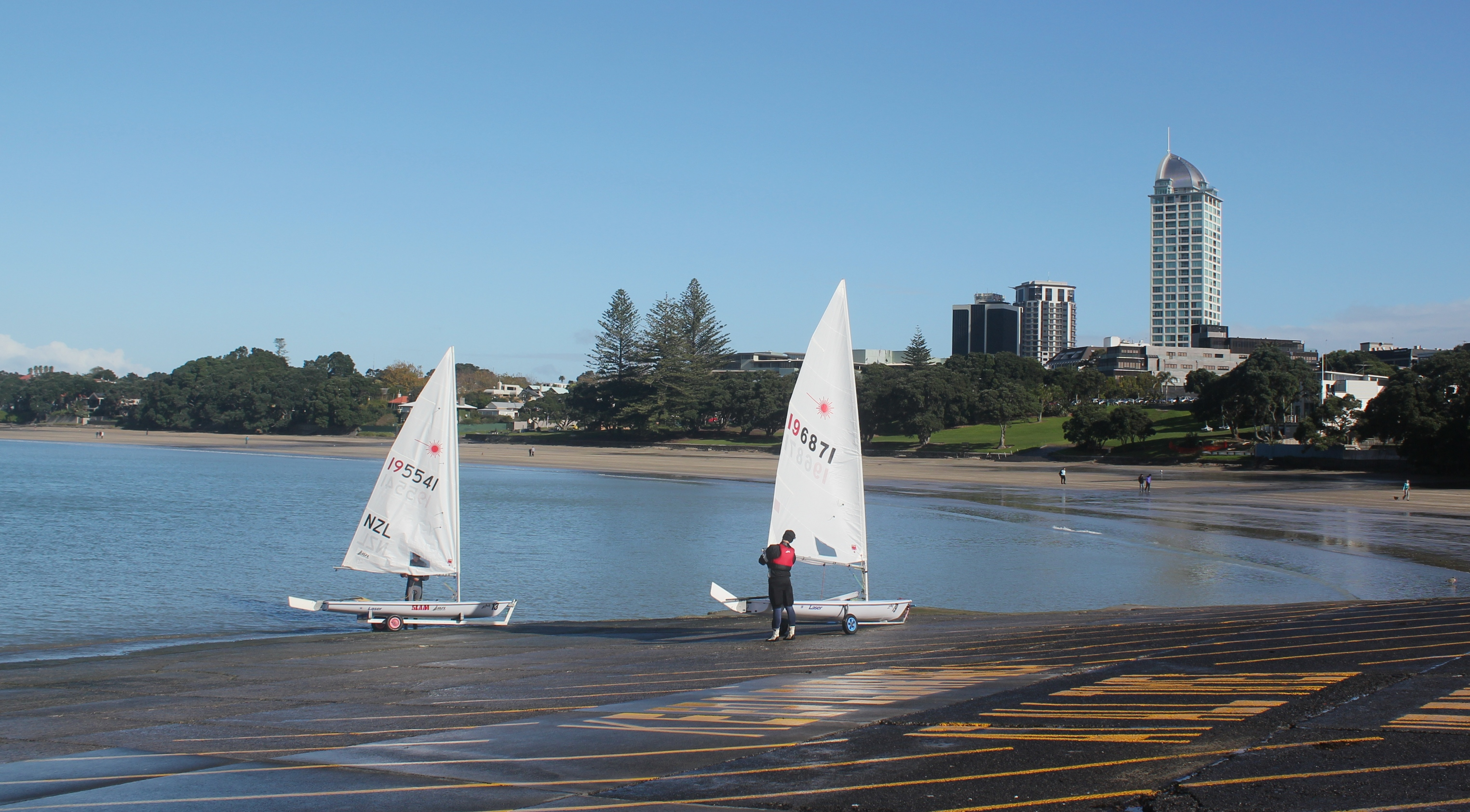
Sailboats at Takapuna Beach on the North Shore

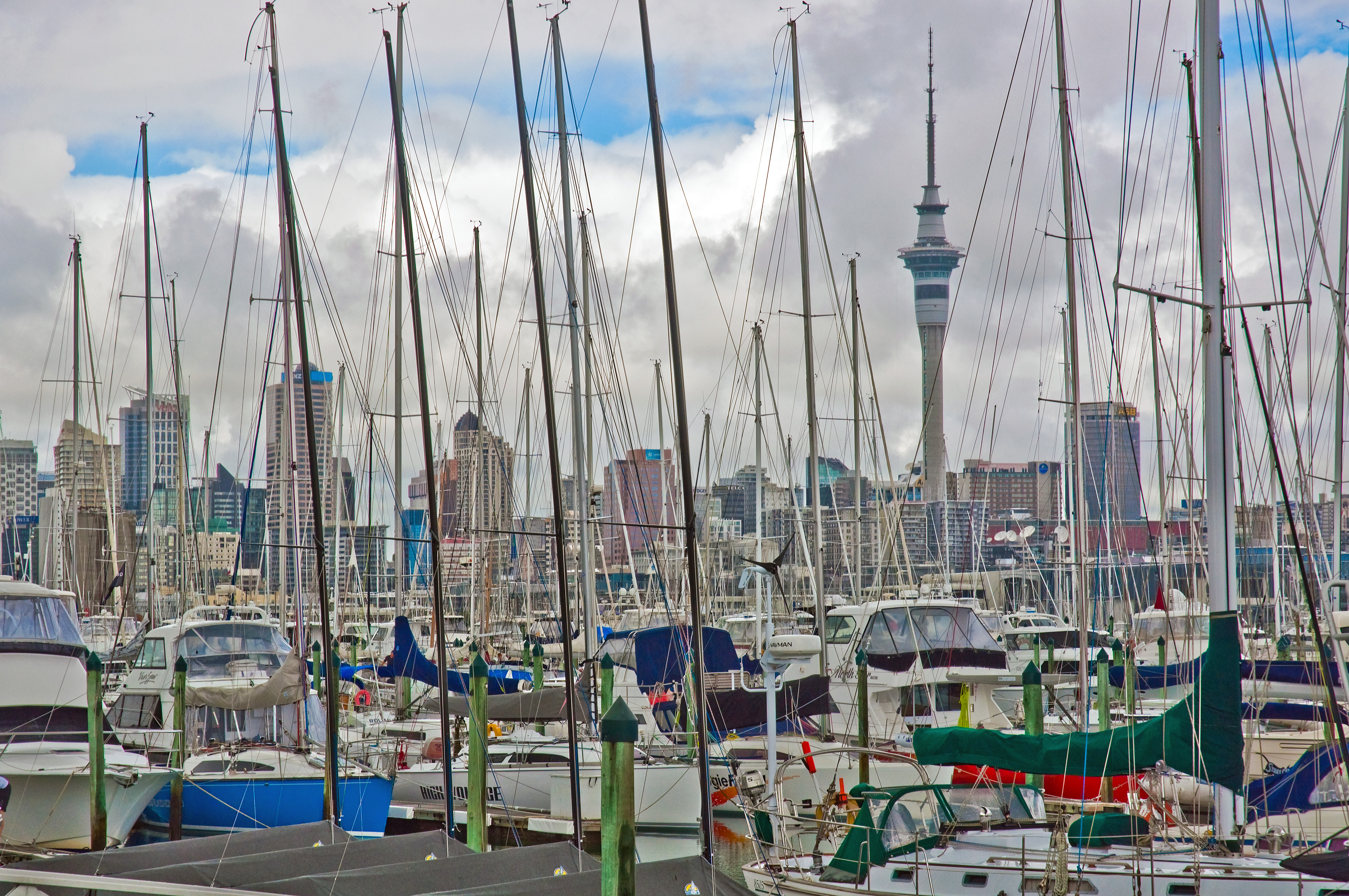
Yachts docked in Westhaven Marina on the Waitematā Harbour

One of Auckland's nicknames, the "City of Sails", is derived from the popularity of sailing in the region. 135,000 yachts and launches are registered in Auckland, and around 60,500 of the country's 149,900 registered yachtsmen are from Auckland, with about one in three Auckland households owning a boat. The Viaduct Basin, on the western edge of the CBD, hosted three America's Cup challenges (2000 Cup, 2003 Cup and 2021 Cup).

The Waitematā Harbour is home to several notable yacht clubs and marinas, including the Royal New Zealand Yacht Squadron and Westhaven Marina, the largest of the Southern Hemisphere. The Waitematā Harbour has several swimming beaches, including Mission Bay and Kohimarama on the south side of the harbour, and Stanley Bay on the north side. On the eastern coastline of the North Shore, where the Rangitoto Channel divides the inner Hauraki Gulf islands from the mainland, there are popular swimming beaches at Cheltenham and Narrow Neck in Devonport, Takapuna, Milford, and the various beaches further north in the area known as East Coast Bays.

The west coast has popular surf beaches such as Piha, Muriwai and Te Henga (Bethells Beach). The Whangaparāoa Peninsula, Orewa, Ōmaha and Pākiri, to the north of the main urban area, are also nearby. Many Auckland beaches are patrolled by surf lifesaving clubs, such as Piha Surf Life Saving Club the home of Piha Rescue. All surf lifesaving clubs are part of the Surf Life Saving Northern Region.

=== Shopping ===
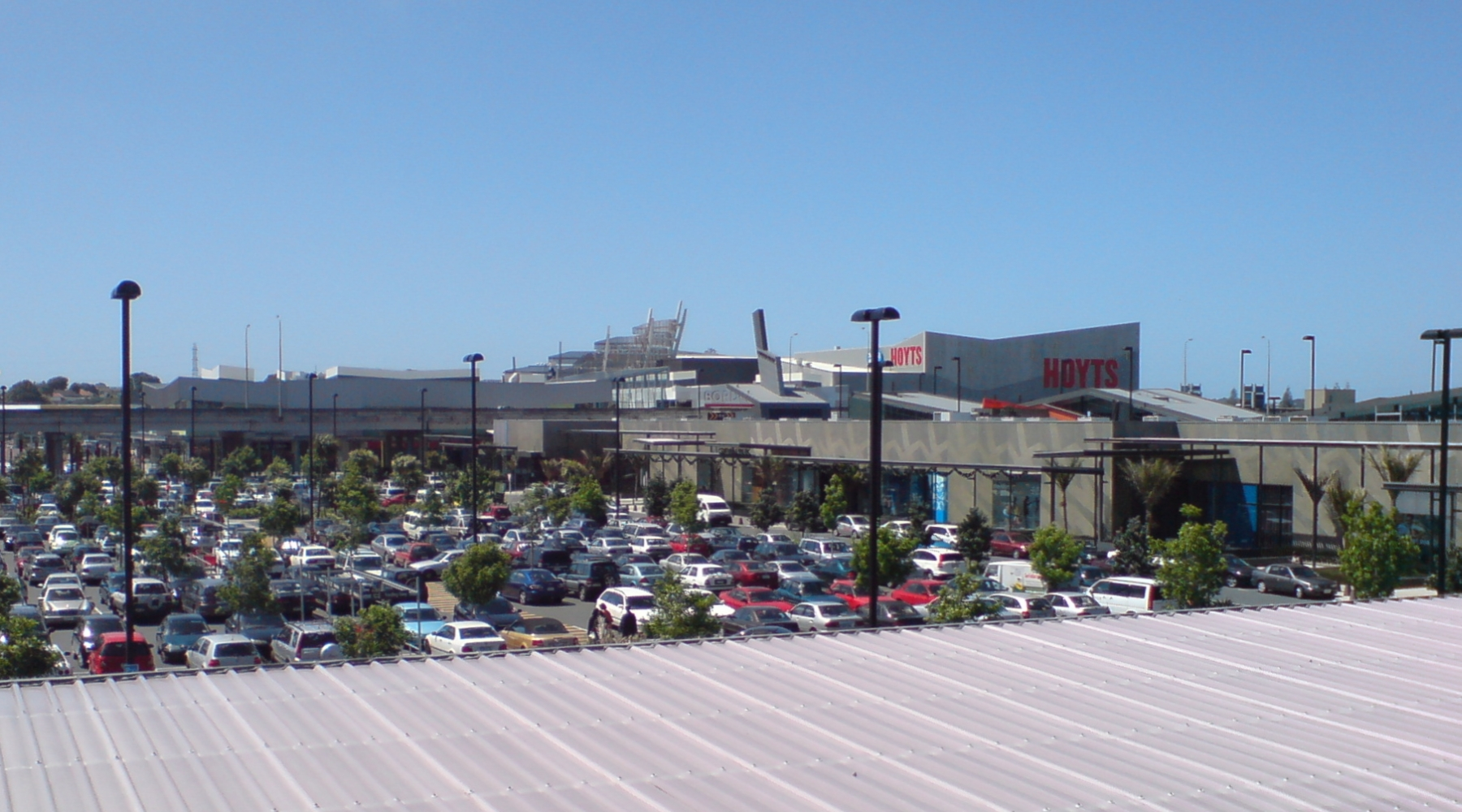
Sylvia Park

Queen Street, Britomart, Ponsonby Road, Karangahape Road, Newmarket and Parnell are major retail areas. Major markets include those held in Ōtara and Avondale on weekend mornings. A number of shopping centres are located in the middle- and outer-suburbs, with Westfield Newmarket, Sylvia Park, Botany Town Centre and Westfield Albany being the largest.

=== Arts ===
A number of arts events are held in Auckland, including the Auckland Festival, the Auckland Triennial, the New Zealand International Comedy Festival, and the New Zealand International Film Festival. The Auckland Philharmonia is the city and region's resident full-time symphony orchestra, performing its own series of concerts and accompanying opera and ballet. Events celebrating the city's cultural diversity include the Pasifika Festival, the Auckland Secondary Schools Māori & Pacific Islands Cultural Festival (more commonly known as Polyfest), and the Auckland Lantern Festival, all of which are the largest of their kind in New Zealand. Additionally, Auckland regularly hosts the New Zealand Symphony Orchestra and Royal New Zealand Ballet. Auckland is part of the UNESCO Creative Cities Network in the category of music.

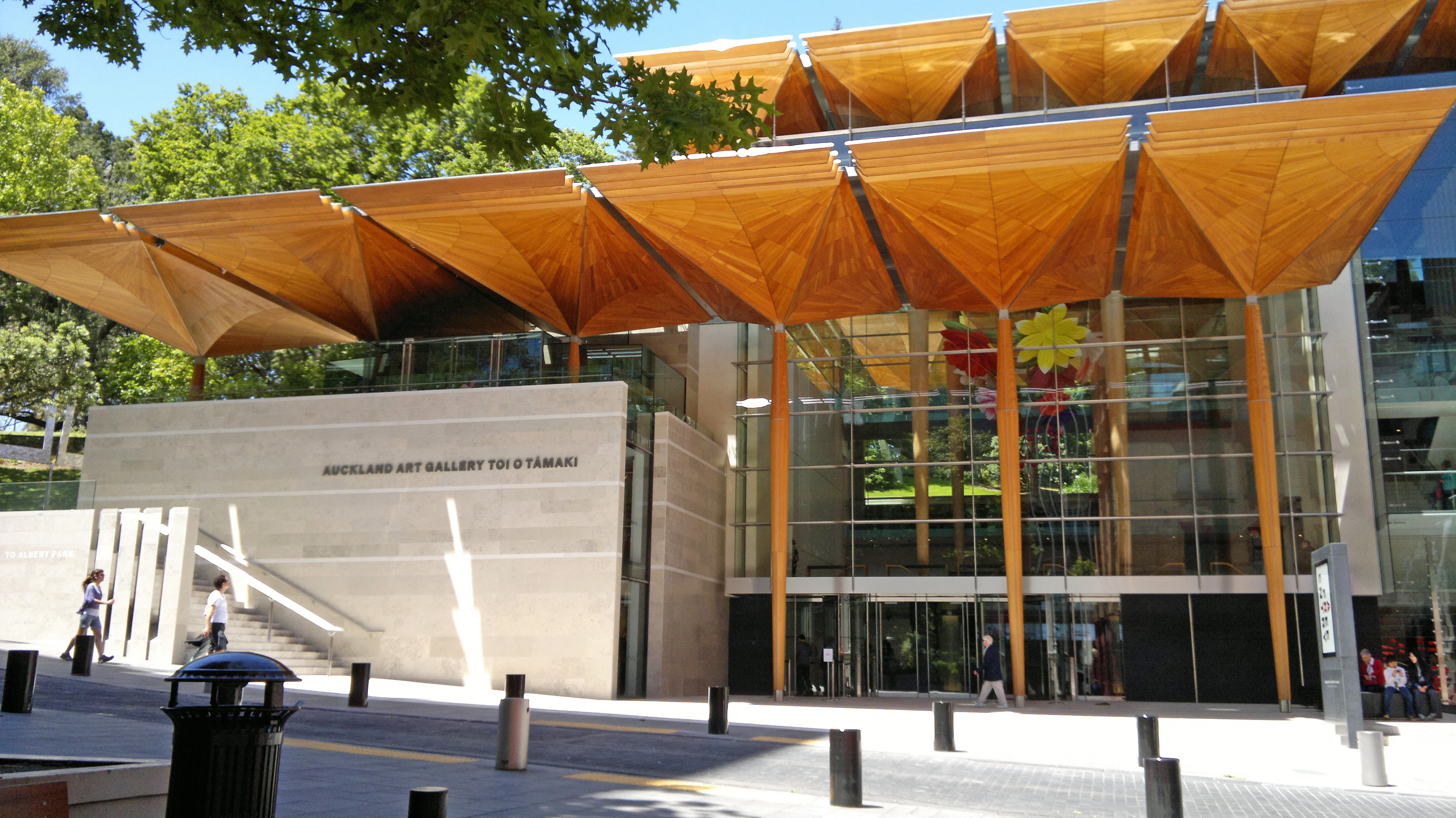
The modern section of the Auckland Art Gallery, completed in 2011

Important institutions include the Auckland Art Gallery, Auckland War Memorial Museum, New Zealand Maritime Museum, National Museum of the Royal New Zealand Navy, and the Museum of Transport and Technology. The Auckland Art Gallery is the largest stand-alone gallery in New Zealand with a collection of over 17,000 artworks, including prominent New Zealand and Pacific Island artists, as well as international painting, sculpture and print collections ranging in date from 1376 to the present day.

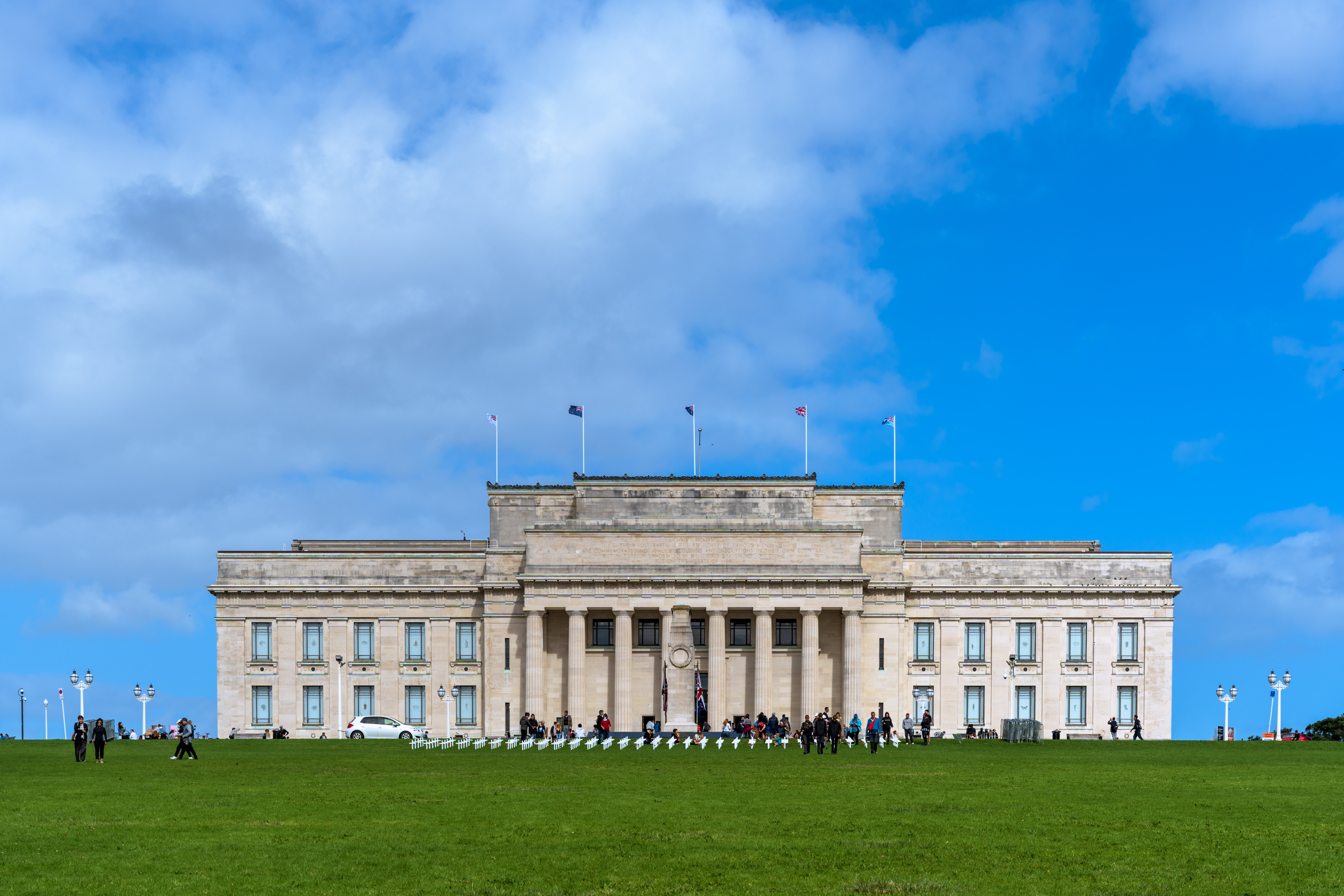
Auckland War Memorial Museum

Other important art galleries include Mangere Arts Centre, Tautai Pacific Arts Trust, Te Tuhi, Te Uru Waitākere Contemporary Gallery, Gow Langsford Gallery, Michael Lett Gallery, Starkwhite, and Bergman Gallery.

=== Parks and nature ===
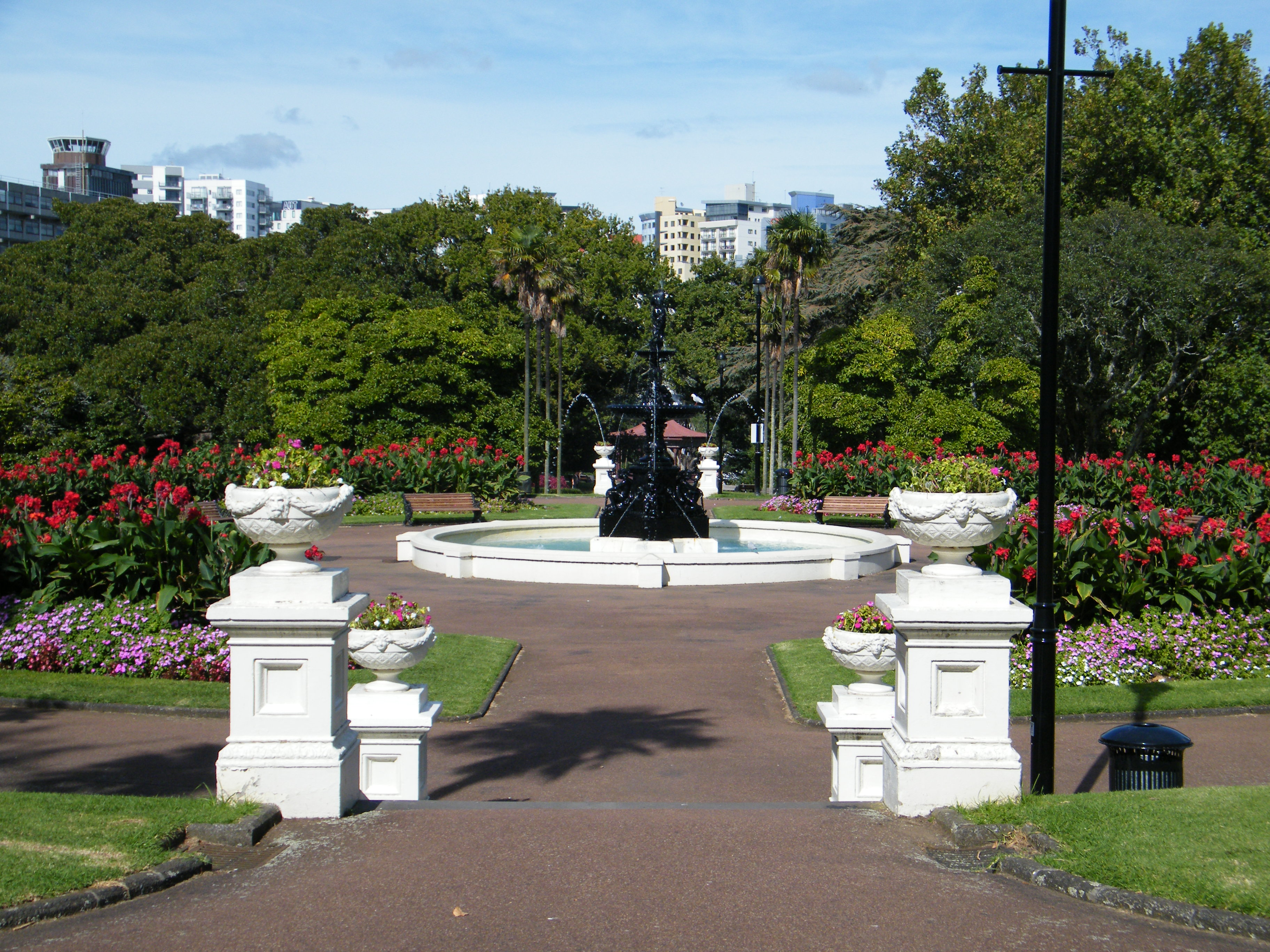
Albert Park in central Auckland

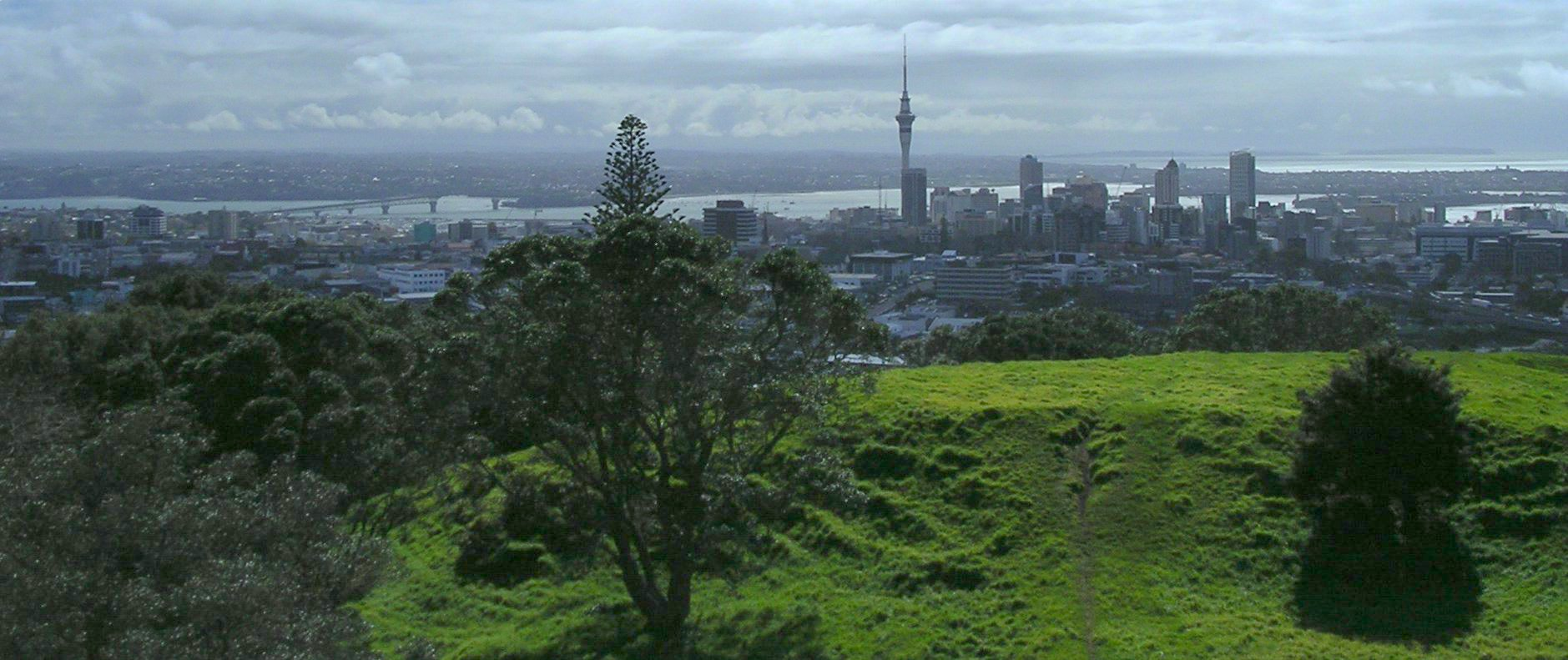
View from the top of Maungawhau / Mount Eden

Auckland Domain is one of the largest parks in the city. It is close to the Auckland CBD. Smaller parks close to the city centre are Albert Park, Myers Park, Western Park and Victoria Park.

While most volcanic cones in the Auckland volcanic field have been affected by quarrying, many of the remaining cones are now within parks, and retain a more natural character than the surrounding city. Prehistoric earthworks and historic fortifications are in several of these parks, including Maungawhau / Mount Eden, North Head and Maungakiekie / One Tree Hill.

Other parks around the city are in Western Springs Reserve, which has a large park bordering the MOTAT museum and the Auckland Zoo. The Auckland Botanic Gardens are further south, in Manurewa.

Ferries provide transport to parks and nature reserves at Devonport, Waiheke Island, Rangitoto Island and Tiritiri Matangi. The Waitākere Ranges Regional Park to the west of Auckland has relatively unspoiled bush territory, as do the Hunua Ranges to the south.

== Transport ==
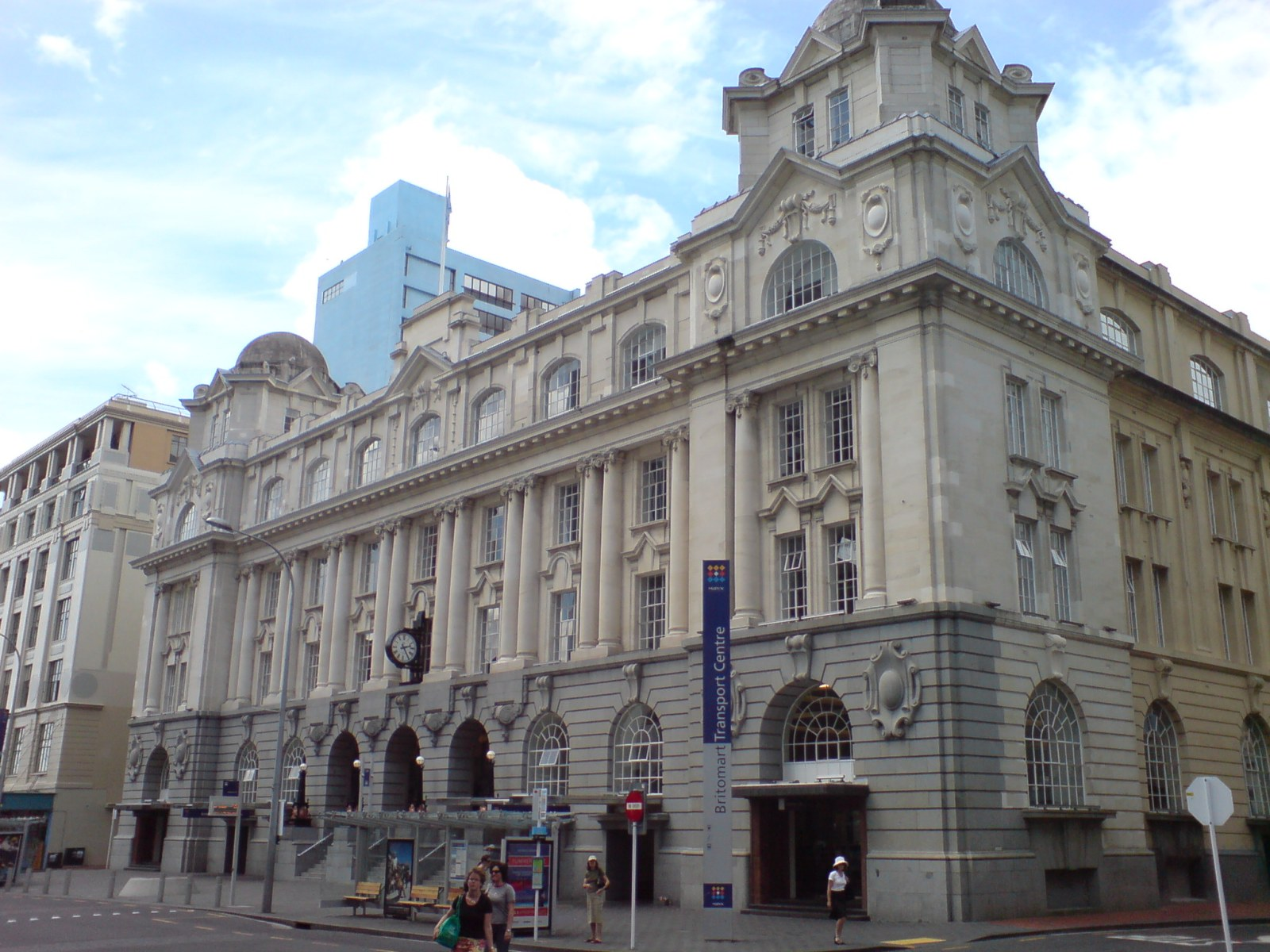
Railway lines serve the western, southern and eastern parts of the city

During the 19th century the main forms of transport to and from Auckland were ferries and trains, with horses being used for shorter distances and trips within the city. From 1902 electric trams provided transport for the central isthmus and resulted in residential expansion in the area. Following the First World War car ownership started to increase and concrete and bitumen roads were built to accommodate this.

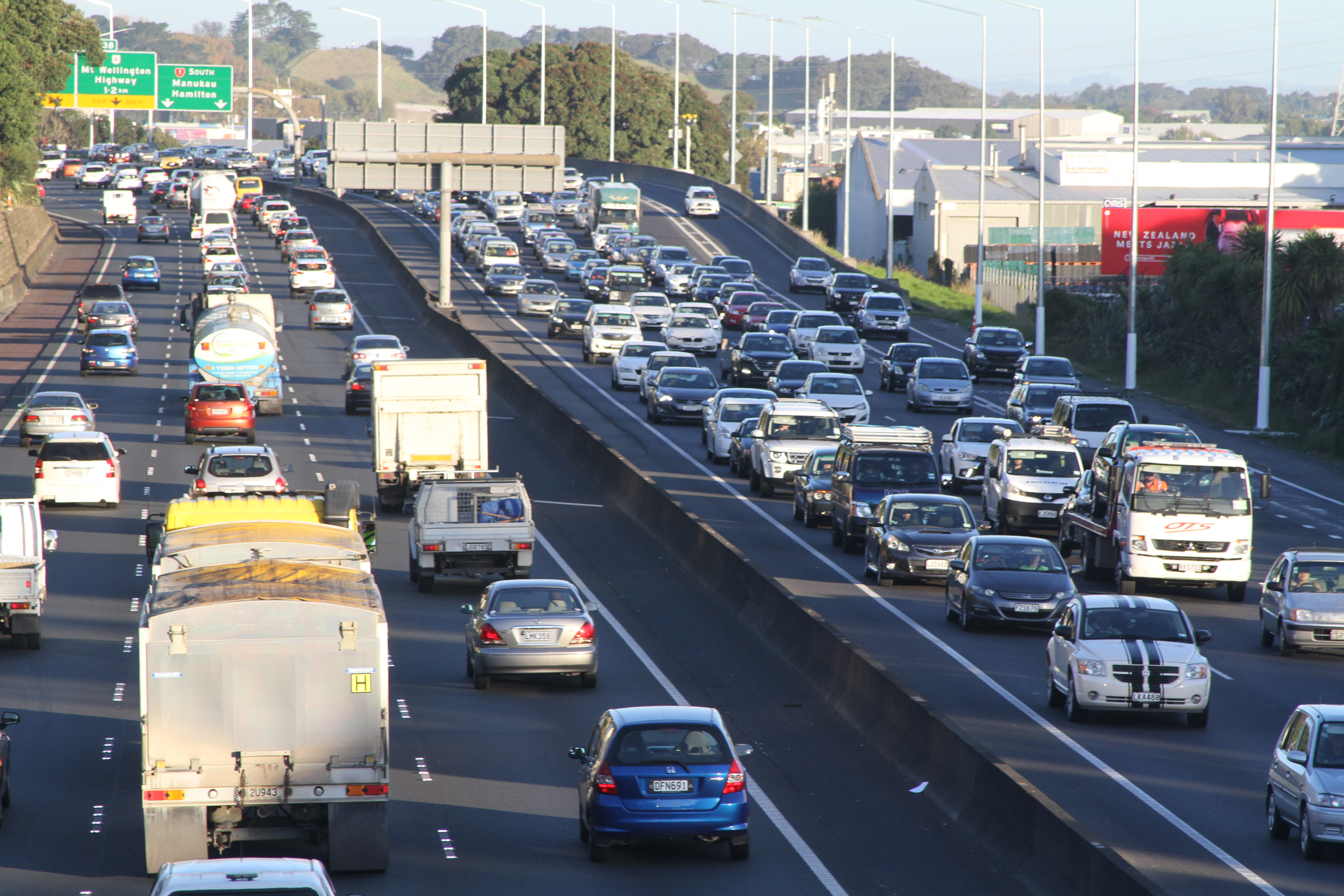
Traffic on the Southern Motorway

The State Highway network connects the different parts of Auckland, with State Highway 1 the major north–south thoroughfare through the city (including both the Northern and Southern Motorways) and the main connection to the adjoining regions of Northland and Waikato. The Northern Busway runs alongside part of the Northern Motorway on the North Shore. Other state highways within Auckland include State Highway 16 (the Northwest Motorway), State Highway 18 (the Upper Harbour Motorway) and State Highway 20 (the Southwest Motorway). State Highway 22 is a non-motorway rural arterial connecting Pukekohe to the Southern Motorway at Drury.

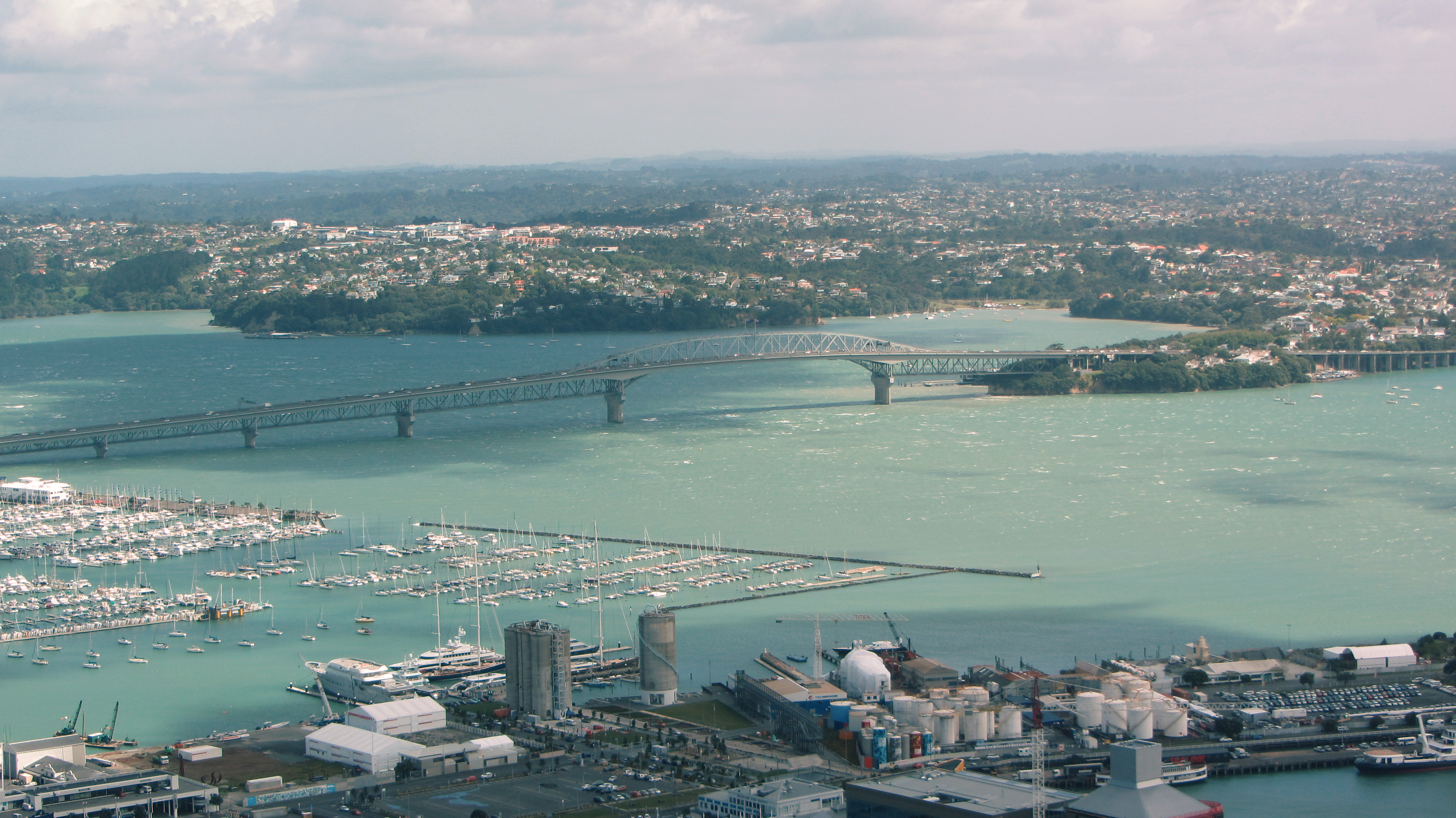
Aerial view of the Auckland Harbour Bridge

The Auckland Harbour Bridge, opened in 1959, is the main connection between the North Shore and the rest of Auckland. The bridge provides eight lanes of vehicle traffic and has a moveable median barrier for lane flexibility, but does not provide access for rail, pedestrians or cyclists. The Central Motorway Junction, also called 'Spaghetti Junction' for its complexity, is the intersection between the two major motorways of Auckland (State Highway 1 and State Highway 16).

Two of the longest arterial roads within the Auckland Region are Great North Road and Great South Road – the main connections in those directions before the construction of the State Highway network. Numerous arterial roads also provide regional and sub-regional connectivity, with many of these roads (especially on the isthmus) previously used to operate Auckland's former tram network.

Auckland has three railway lines (East West (E-W), Onehunga West (O-W), and South City (S-C)). These lines serve the western, southern and eastern parts of Auckland. Work began in late 2015 to provide more route flexibility and connect Britomart, now named Waitematā, more directly to the western suburbs on the Western Line via an underground rail tunnel known as the City Rail Link project. The City Rail Link opened on 13 September 2026. A plan for a light rail network was cancelled in 2024.

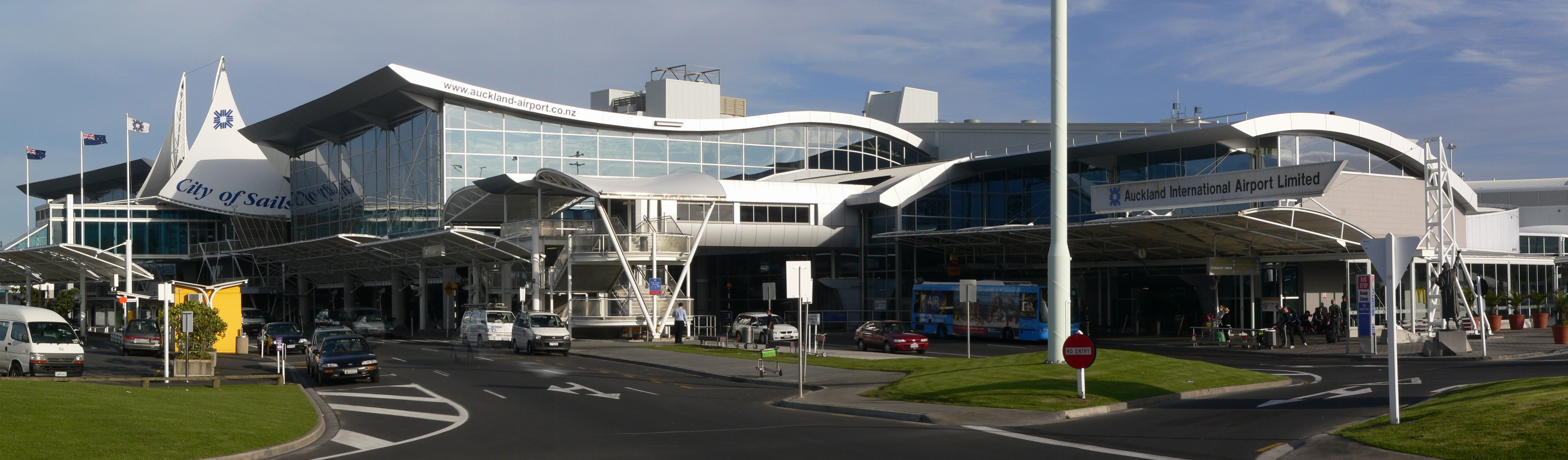
Auckland Airport's international terminal

Auckland Airport, New Zealand's largest and busiest, is in the southern suburb of Māngere on the shores of the Manukau Harbour. It services both domestic and international flights. There are also several small regional airports.

Auckland's ports are the second largest in the country, behind the Port of Tauranga, and a large part of both inbound and outbound New Zealand commerce travels through them, mostly via the facilities northeast of Auckland CBD. Freight usually arrives at or is distributed from the port via road, though the port facilities also have rail access. Auckland is a major cruise ship stopover point, with the ships usually tying up at Princes Wharf. Auckland CBD is connected to the coastal suburbs, to the North Shore and to outlying islands by ferry.

=== Travel modes ===
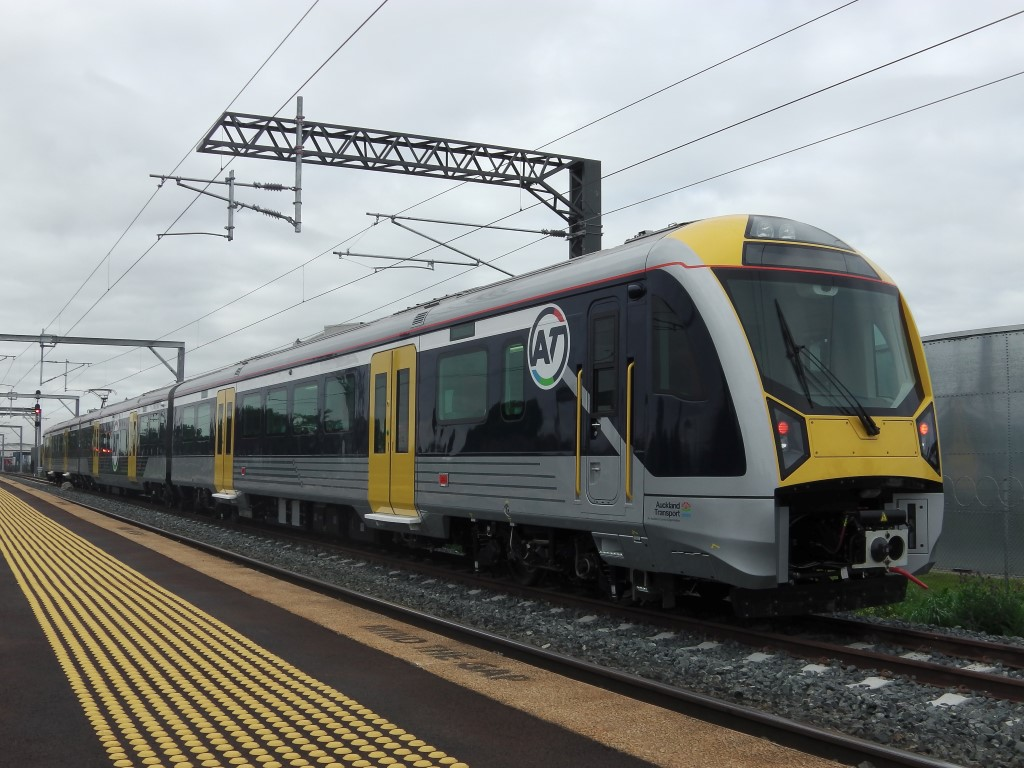
An Auckland Transport electric train

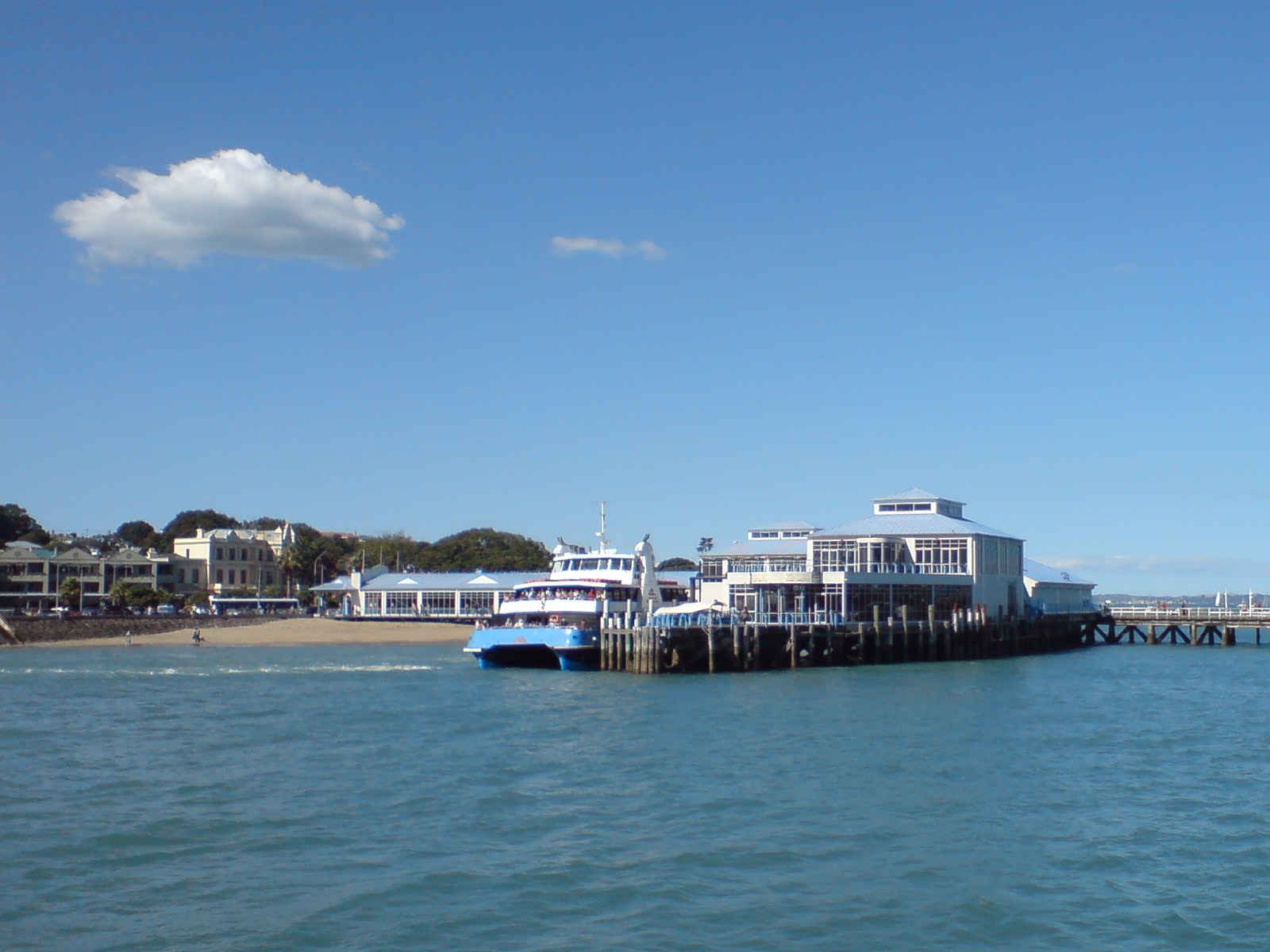
Devonport ferry terminal

Private vehicles are the main form of transportation within Auckland, with around seven percent of journeys in the Auckland Region undertaken by bus in 2006, and two percent undertaken by train and ferry. For trips to the city centre at peak times, the use of public transport is much higher, with more than half of trips undertaken by bus, train or ferry. In 2010, Auckland ranked quite low in its use of public transport, having only 46 public transport trips per capita per year, while Wellington has almost twice this number at 91, and Sydney has 114 trips. This strong dependence on roads results in substantial traffic congestion during peak times. This car reliance means 56% of the city's energy usage goes towards transportation, and CO_{2} emissions will increase by 20% in the next 10 years.

Bus services in Auckland consist mostly of radial and cross-town routes, with a total bus fleet of roughly 1,350 vehicles across its metropolitan network. Late-night services (i.e. past midnight) are limited, even on weekends. The most frequent bus services operate at least every 15 minutes during the day and early evening, every day of the week. Auckland is connected with other cities through bus services operated by InterCity.

Rail services operate along four lines between the CBD and the west, south and south-east of Auckland, with longer-distance trains operating to Wellington only a few times each week. Following the opening of Waitematā railway station in 2003, major investment in Auckland's rail network occurred, involving station upgrades, rolling stock refurbishment and infrastructure improvements. The rail upgrade has included electrification of Auckland's rail network, with electric trains constructed by Construcciones y Auxiliar de Ferrocarriles commencing service in April 2014. A number of proposed projects to further extend Auckland's rail network were included in the 2012 Auckland Plan, including the City Rail Link, the Auckland Airport Line, the Avondale-Southdown Line and rail to the North Shore.

Research at Griffith University has indicated that from the 1950s to the 1980s, Auckland engaged in some of the most pro-automobile transport policies anywhere in the world. With public transport declining heavily during the second half of the 20th century (a trend mirrored in most Western countries, such as the US), and increased spending on roads and cars, New Zealand (and specifically Auckland) now has the second-highest vehicle ownership rate in the world, with around 578 vehicles per 1000 people. Auckland has also been called a very pedestrian- and cyclist-unfriendly city, though some efforts are being made to change this, with Auckland being a major participant in the government's "Urban Cycleways" initiative, and with the "SkyPath" project for a walk and cycleway on the Auckland Harbour Bridge having received Council support, and planning consent.

== Infrastructure and services ==
=== Electricity ===
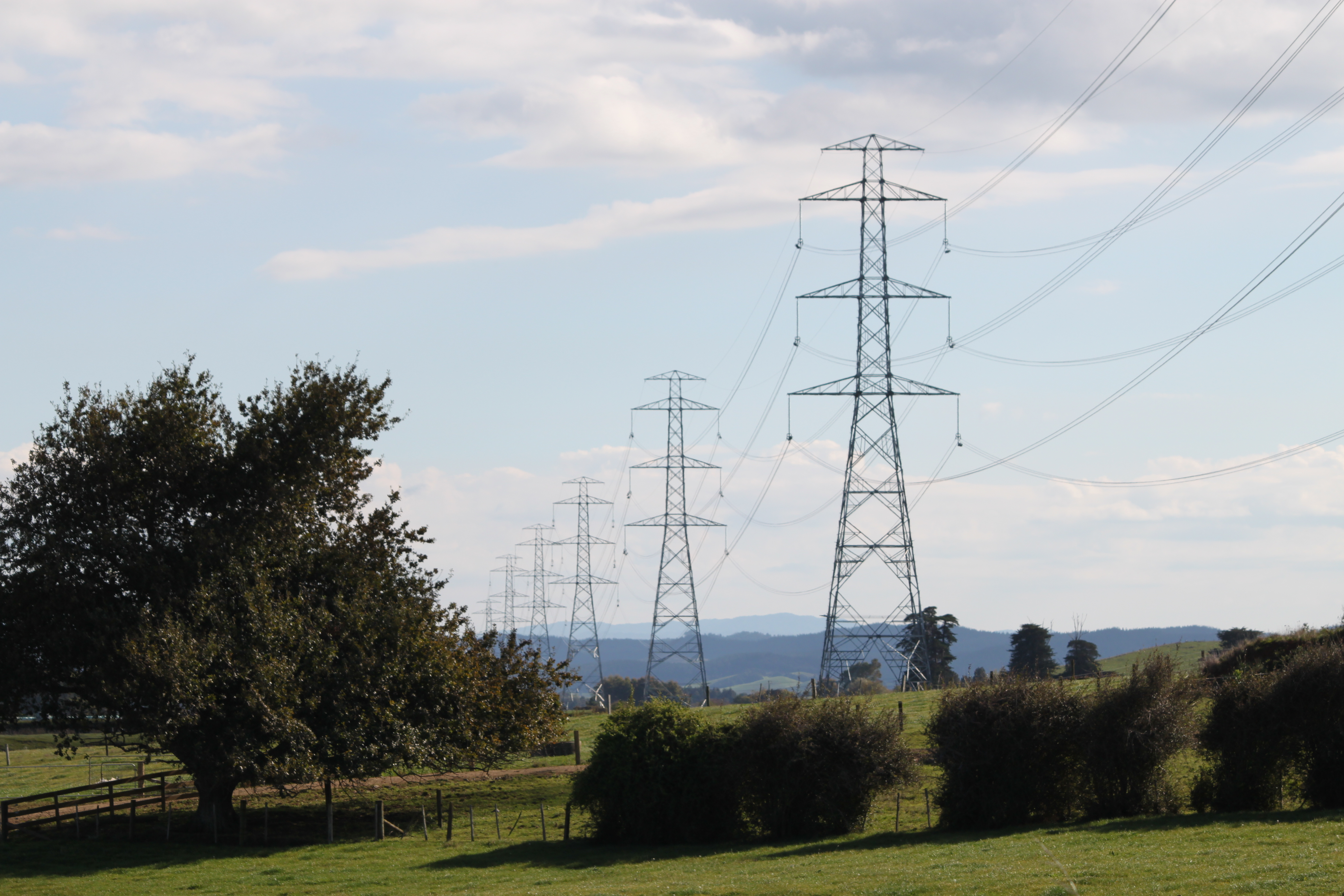
Whakamaru to Brownhill Road transmission line near Te Kauwhata

Vector owns and operates the majority of the distribution network in urban Auckland, with Counties Energy owning and operating the network south of central Papakura. The city is supplied from Transpower's national grid from thirteen substations across the city. There are no major electricity generation stations located within the city or north of Auckland, so almost all of the electricity for Auckland and Northland must be transmitted from power stations in the south, mainly from Huntly Power Station and the Waikato River hydroelectric stations. The city had two natural gas-fired power stations (the 404 MW Ōtāhuhu B and the 175 MW Southdown), but both shut down in 2015.

There have been several notable power outages in Auckland. The five-week-long 1998 Auckland power crisis blacked out much of the CBD after a cascade failure occurred on the four main underground cables supplying the CBD. The 2006 Auckland Blackout interrupted supply to the CBD and many inner suburbs after an earth wire shackle at Transpower's Otāhuhu substation broke and short-circuited the lines supplying the inner city. In 2009, much of the northern and western suburbs, as well as all of Northland, experienced a blackout when a forklift accidentally came into contact with the Ōtāhuhu to Henderson 220 kV line, the only major line supplying the region.

Transpower spent $1.25 billion in the early 2010s reinforcing the supply into and across Auckland, including a 400 kV-capable transmission line from the Waikato River to Brownhill substation (operating initially at 220 kV), and 220 kV underground cables between Brownhill and Pakuranga, and between Pakuranga and Albany via the CBD. These reduced the Auckland Region's reliance on Ōtāhuhu substation and northern and western Auckland's reliance on the Ōtāhuhu to Henderson line.

=== Natural gas ===
Auckland was one of the original nine towns and cities in New Zealand to be supplied with natural gas when the Kapuni gas field entered production in 1970 and a 340 km long high-pressure pipeline from the field in Taranaki to the city was completed. Auckland was connected to the Maui gas field in 1982 following the completion of a high-pressure pipeline from the Maui gas pipeline near Huntly, via the city, to Whangārei in Northland.

The high-pressure transmission pipelines supplying the city are now owned and operated by First Gas, with Vector owning and operating the medium and low-pressure distribution pipelines in the city.

== Sport ==
Rugby union, cricket, rugby league, association football (soccer) and netball are widely played and followed.

There are three racecourses within the city (Ellerslie and Avondale for thoroughbred racing, and Alexandra Park for harness racing). A fourth racecourse is located at Pukekohe, straddling the boundary between Auckland and the neighbouring Waikato region. Greyhound racing is held at Manukau Stadium.

Major sporting venues:

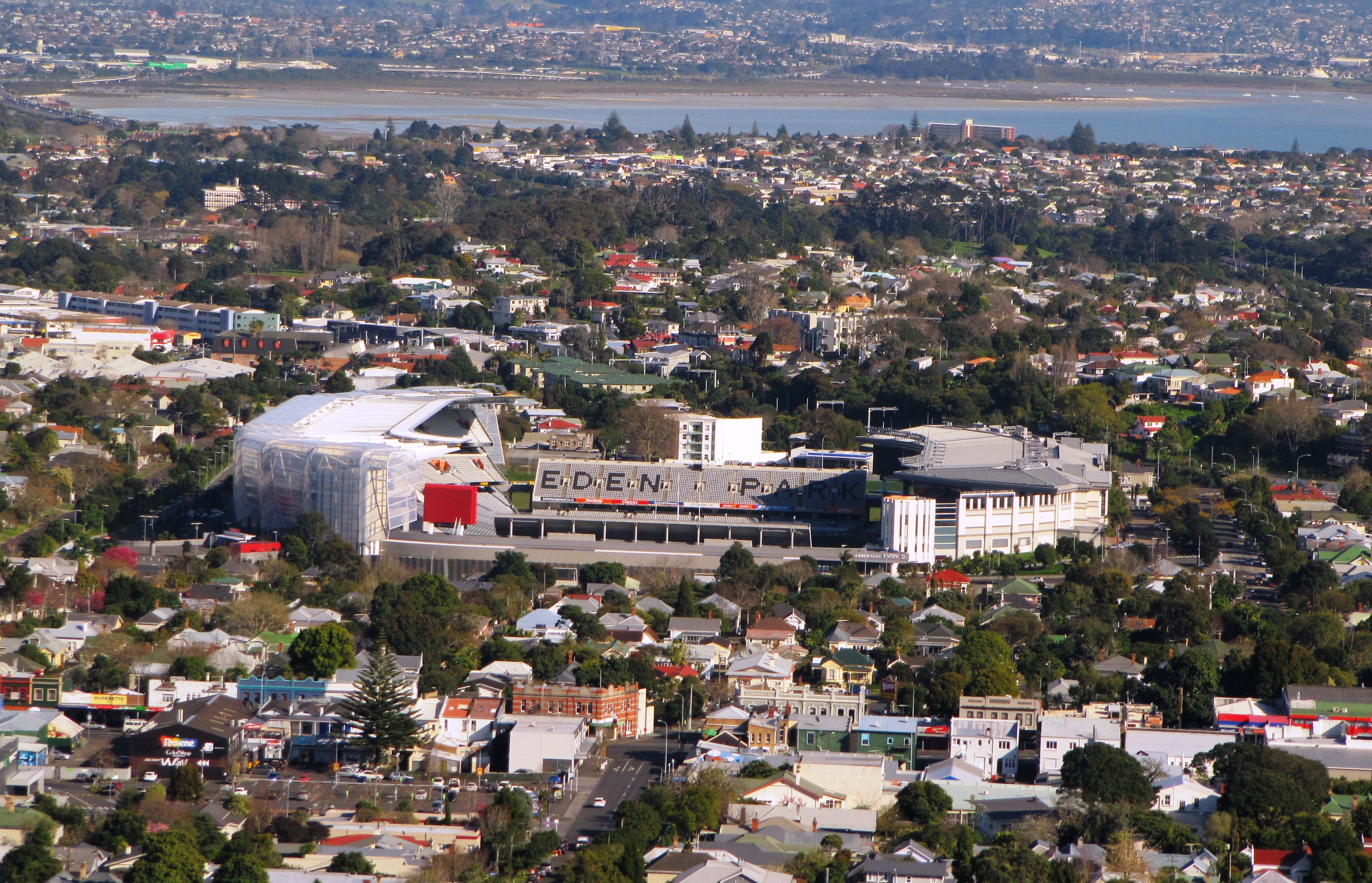
Eden Park, the largest stadium in Auckland by capacity with 50,000 seats

- Eden Park is the city's primary stadium and a frequent home for international rugby union and cricket matches, in addition to Super Rugby matches where the Blues play their home games. It is also the home ground of Auckland in the Mitre 10 Cup, and Auckland in domestic cricket.

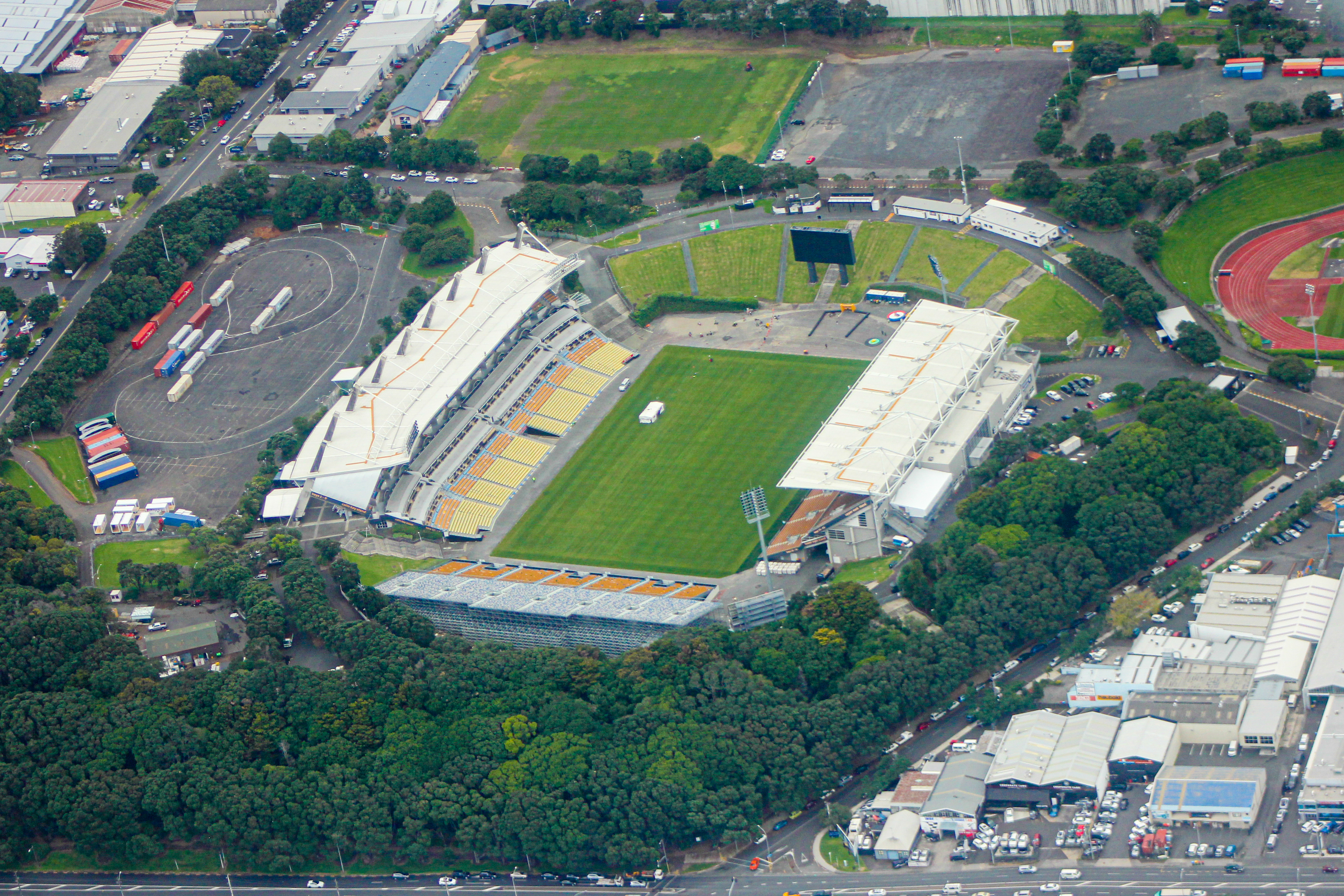
Mount Smart Stadium

- Mt Smart Stadium is used mainly for rugby league and association football matches and is home to the New Zealand Warriors of the NRL and Auckland FC of the A-League, and is also used for concerts, previously hosting the Auckland show of the annual Big Day Out music festival and the 1990 Commonwealth Games.
- North Harbour Stadium is mainly used for rugby union and football (soccer) matches, but is also used for concerts. It is the home ground for North Harbour in the Mitre 10 Cup.
- ASB Tennis Centre is Auckland's primary tennis venue, hosting international tournaments for men and women (ASB Classic) in January each year. ASB Bank took over the sponsorship of the men's tournament from 2016, the event formerly being known as the Heineken Open.

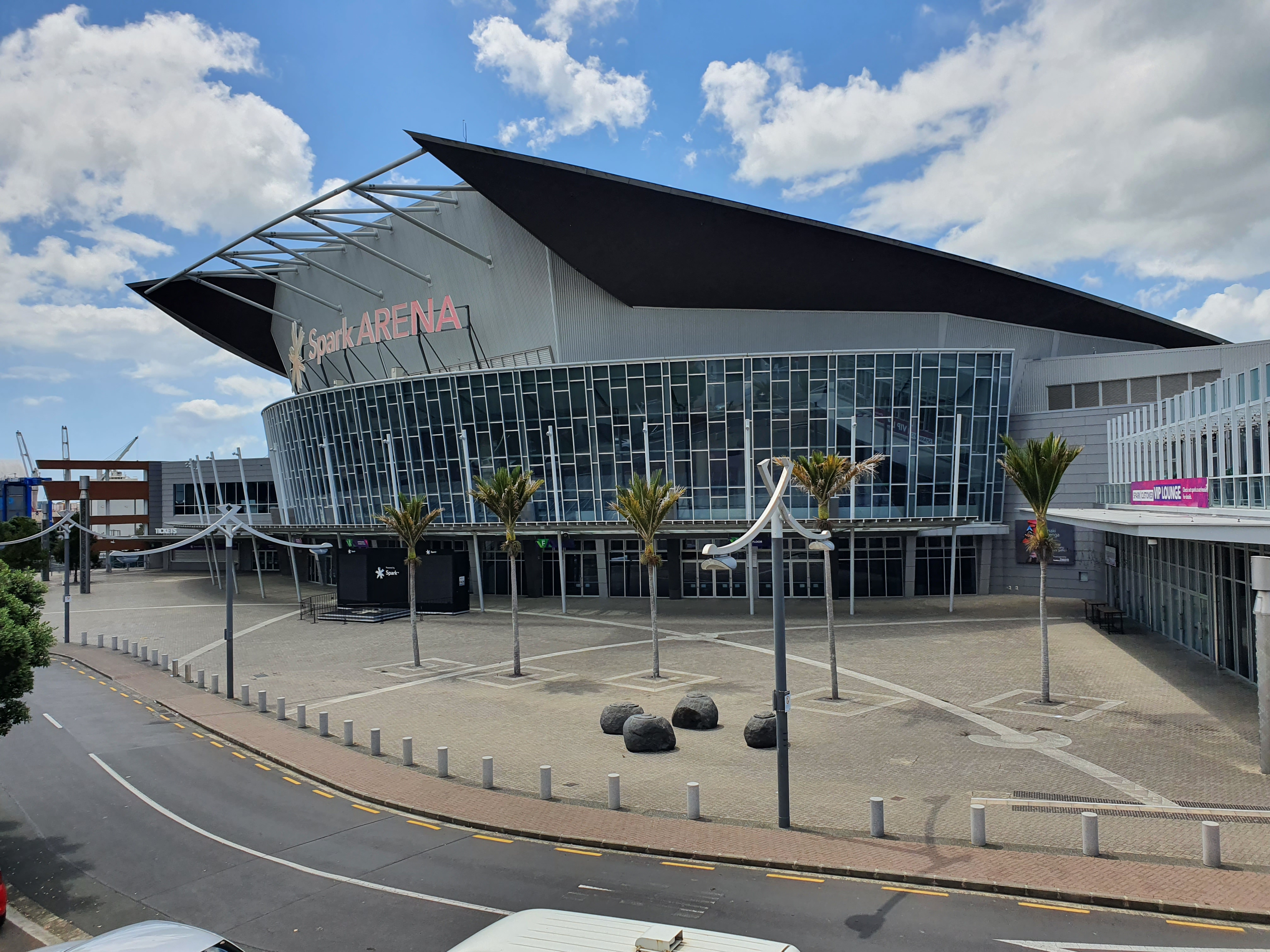
Spark Arena

- Spark Arena, previously known as Vector Arena, is an indoor auditorium primarily used for concerts and is the home of the New Zealand Breakers basketball team. It also hosts international netball.
- Trusts Arena is an indoor venue which primarily hosts netball matches, and is the home of the Northern Mystics of the ANZ Premiership. It is also where the 2007 World Netball Championships were held. Since 2015, an annual event on the World Series of Darts has been held there.
- North Shore Events Centre is an indoor arena which is used for a variety of sporting events, as well as concerts and expos. It was formerly home to the New Zealand Breakers and hosted much of the 2009 FIBA Under-19 World Championship.
- Vodafone Events Centre is an indoor arena which hosts a variety of events, and is the home of the Northern Stars netball team of the ANZ Premiership.
- Pukekohe Park Raceway is a thoroughbred horse-racing venue that used to host a leg of the V8 Supercars series annually, along with other motorsports events. The most important horse-racing meeting is held annually at the end of November, featuring the Group 2 Counties Cup and three other stakes races.
- Western Springs Stadium has since 1929 hosted speedway racing during the summer. It also hosts concerts, with many of New Zealand's largest-ever concerts having taken place at the stadium. It is also the home of Ponsonby RFC.

Major teams based in Auckland who compete in national or transnational competitions are:

- Formerly Auckland Blues, the Blues compete in Super Rugby. Auckland is also home to three Mitre 10 Cup rugby union teams: Auckland, North Harbour and Counties Manukau.
- Previously Auckland Warriors, the New Zealand Warriors are a team in Australia's National Rugby League competition. They play their home games at Mt Smart Stadium. The Akarana Falcons and Counties Manukau compete in the National Competition.
- Auckland's men's first class cricket team, the Auckland Aces, play their home matches at Eden Park, generally on the outer oval. The women's team, the Auckland Hearts, play at Melville Park in Epsom.
- Auckland FC are a professional football club that compete in the A-League Men competition, and will join A-League Women in the 2027/28 season. The football club play their home games at Mt Smart Stadium
- Auckland City, Auckland United, and Eastern Suburbs are football teams play in the Northern League.
- Northern Mystics and Northern Stars are netball teams who compete in the ANZ Premiership. The Mystics play their home games at Trusts Stadium and the Stars at the Vodafone Events Centre.
- New Zealand Breakers are a basketball team who compete in the Australian National Basketball League and play their home games primarily at Spark Arena. The Auckland Tuatara and Franklin Bulls play in the New Zealand National Basketball League.
- Botany Swarm and West Auckland Admirals compete in the New Zealand Ice Hockey League.
- Auckland Tuatara had previously competed in the Australian Baseball League.

Annual sporting events include:

- The ATP Auckland Open and the WTA Auckland Open (both known for sponsorship reasons as the ASB Classic), are men's and women's tennis tournaments, respectively, which are held annually at the ASB Tennis Centre in January. The men's tournament has been held since 1956, and the women's tournament since 1986.
- The Auckland Super400 (known for sponsorship reasons as the ITM Auckland Super 400) was a Supercars Championship race held at Pukekohe Park Raceway. The race has been held intermittently since 1996
- The Auckland Marathon (and half-marathon) is an annual marathon It is the largest marathon in New Zealand and draws in the vicinity of 15,000 entrants. It has been held annually since 1992.
- The Auckland Anniversary Regatta is a sailing regatta which has been held annually since 1840, the year of Auckland's founding. It is held over Auckland Anniversary weekend and attracts several hundred entrants each year. It is the largest such regatta, and the oldest sporting event, in New Zealand.
- Auckland Cup Week is an annual horse racing carnival, which has been held in early March since its inception in 2006. It is the richest such carnival in New Zealand, and incorporates several of New Zealand's major thoroughbred horse races, including the Auckland Cup, held since 1874, and New Zealand Derby, held since 1875.
- The Auckland Harbour Crossing Swim is an annual summer swimming event. The swim crosses the Waitematā Harbour, from the North Shore to the Viaduct Basin covering 2.8 km (often with some considerable counter-currents). The event has been held since 2004 and attracts over a thousand mostly amateur entrants each year, making it New Zealand's largest ocean swim.
- Round the Bays is an annual fun-run. The course travels eastwards along the Auckland waterfront, with the run starting in the CBD and ending in St Heliers, the total length being 8.4 km (5.2 mi). It is the largest fun-run in New Zealand and attracts tens of thousands of entrants each year, with the number of entrants reported to have peaked at 80,000 in 1982. It has been held annually since 1972.

Major events previously held in Auckland include the 1950 British Empire Games and the Commonwealth Games in 1990, and a number of matches (including the semi-finals and the final) of the 1987 Rugby World Cup and 2011 Rugby World Cup. Auckland hosted the America's Cup and Louis Vuitton Cup in 2000, 2003, and 2021. The 2007 World Netball Championships were held at the Trusts Stadium. The ITU World Triathlon Series held a Grand Final event in the Auckland CBD from 2012 until 2015. The NRL Auckland Nines was a rugby league nines preseason competition played at Eden Park from 2014 to 2017. The 2017 World Masters Games were held at a number of venues around Auckland. The Auckland Darts Masters was held annually at The Trusts Arena from 2015 to 2018.

== Education ==
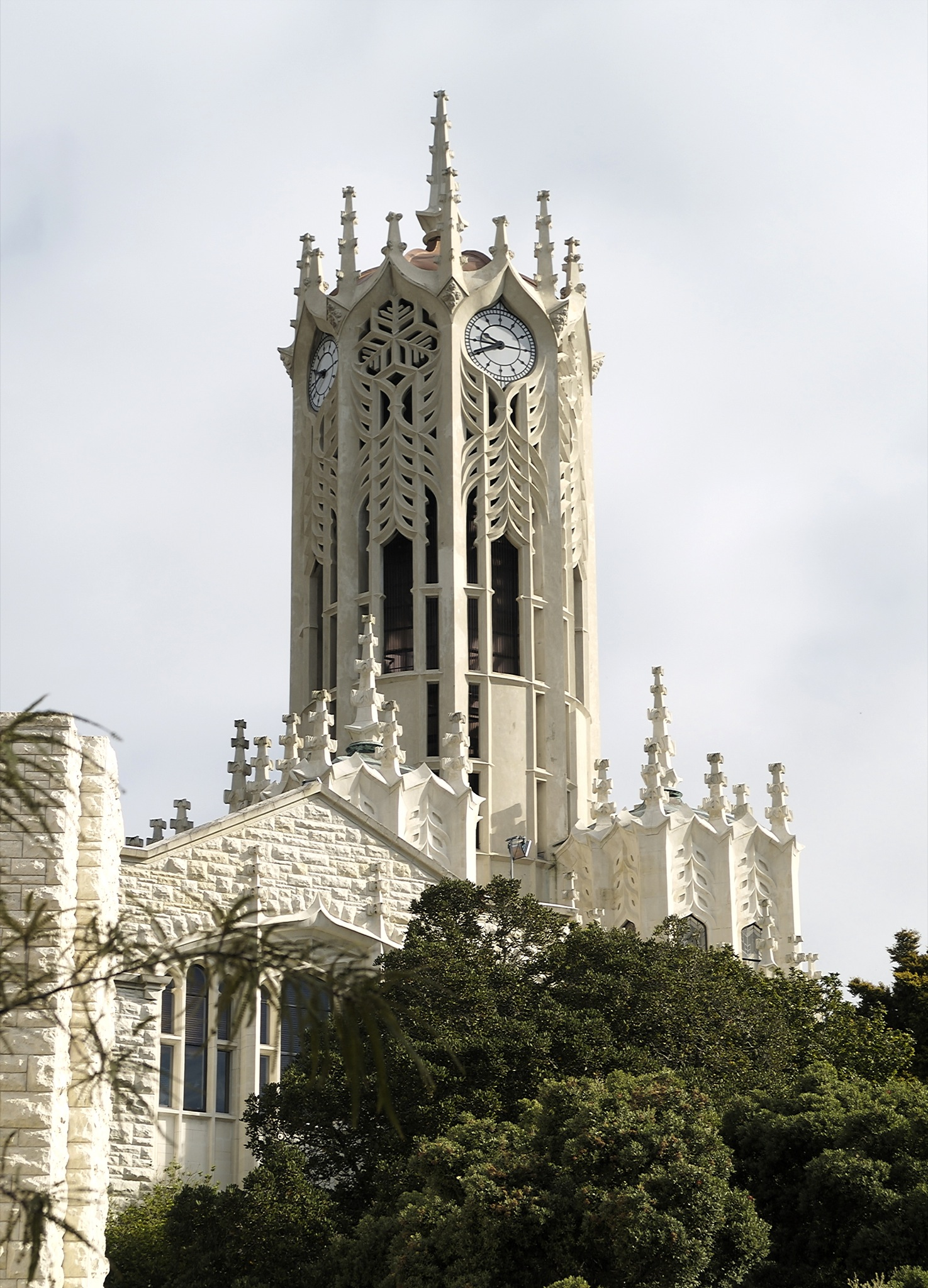
The University of Auckland clock tower building is a 'Category I' historic place, completed in 1926.

The Auckland urban area has 340 primary schools, 80 secondary schools, and 29 composite (primary/secondary combined) schools as of February 2012, catering for roughly 250,000 students. The majority are state schools, but 63 schools are state-integrated and 39 are private.

The city is home to some of the largest schools in terms of students in New Zealand, including Mt Albert Grammar School, the second-largest school in New Zealand with a student population of 3035, and Rangitoto College in the East Coast Bays area, the largest school in New Zealand with 4,167 students as of July 2026.

Auckland has some of the largest universities in the country. Five of New Zealand's eight universities and eight of its fifteen polytechnics have campuses in Auckland. The University of Auckland, Auckland University of Technology, Manukau Institute of Technology, and Unitec Institute of Technology are based in Auckland. Of institutions based in other regions, the University of Otago, Victoria University of Wellington, Massey University and several polytechnics have satellite campuses in Auckland.

Auckland is a major centre of overseas language education, with large numbers of foreign students (particularly East Asians) coming to the city for several months or years to learn English or study at universities – although numbers New Zealand-wide have dropped substantially since peaking in 2003. As of 2007, there are around 50 New Zealand Qualifications Authority (NZQA) certified schools and institutes teaching English in the Auckland area.

== Cultural references ==
- Advocates of the city sometimes like to quote Rudyard Kipling's invocation its remoteness: "Last, loneliest, loveliest, exquisite, apart", from his poem "The Song of the Cities" (1893).
- Different works of Robert Heinlein refer to a fictional human colony on Venus as "New Auckland".

== International relationships ==
Auckland Council maintains relationships with the following cities and countries.

Sister cities:

- Los Angeles, United States (1971)
- Utsunomiya, Japan (1982)
- Fukuoka, Japan (1986)
- Brisbane, Australia (1988)
- Guangzhou, China (1989)
- Kakogawa, Japan (1992)
- Busan, South Korea (1996)
- Taichung, Taiwan (1996)
- Ningbo, China (1998)
- Qingdao, China (2008)

Friendship and Cooperation cities:

- Tomioka, Japan (1983)
- Shinagawa, Japan (1993)
- Galway, Ireland (2002)
- Nadi, Fiji (2006)
- Hamburg, Germany (2007)
- Pohang, South Korea (2008)
- Shanghai, China (2012)

Cooperation countries:

- Cook Islands (2012)
- Samoa (2012)
- Tonga (2012)

== See also ==
- Jafa, a sometimes pejorative term for Aucklanders
- Category:People from Auckland
