= Jesse Rivest =

Canadian singer-songwriter and guitarist

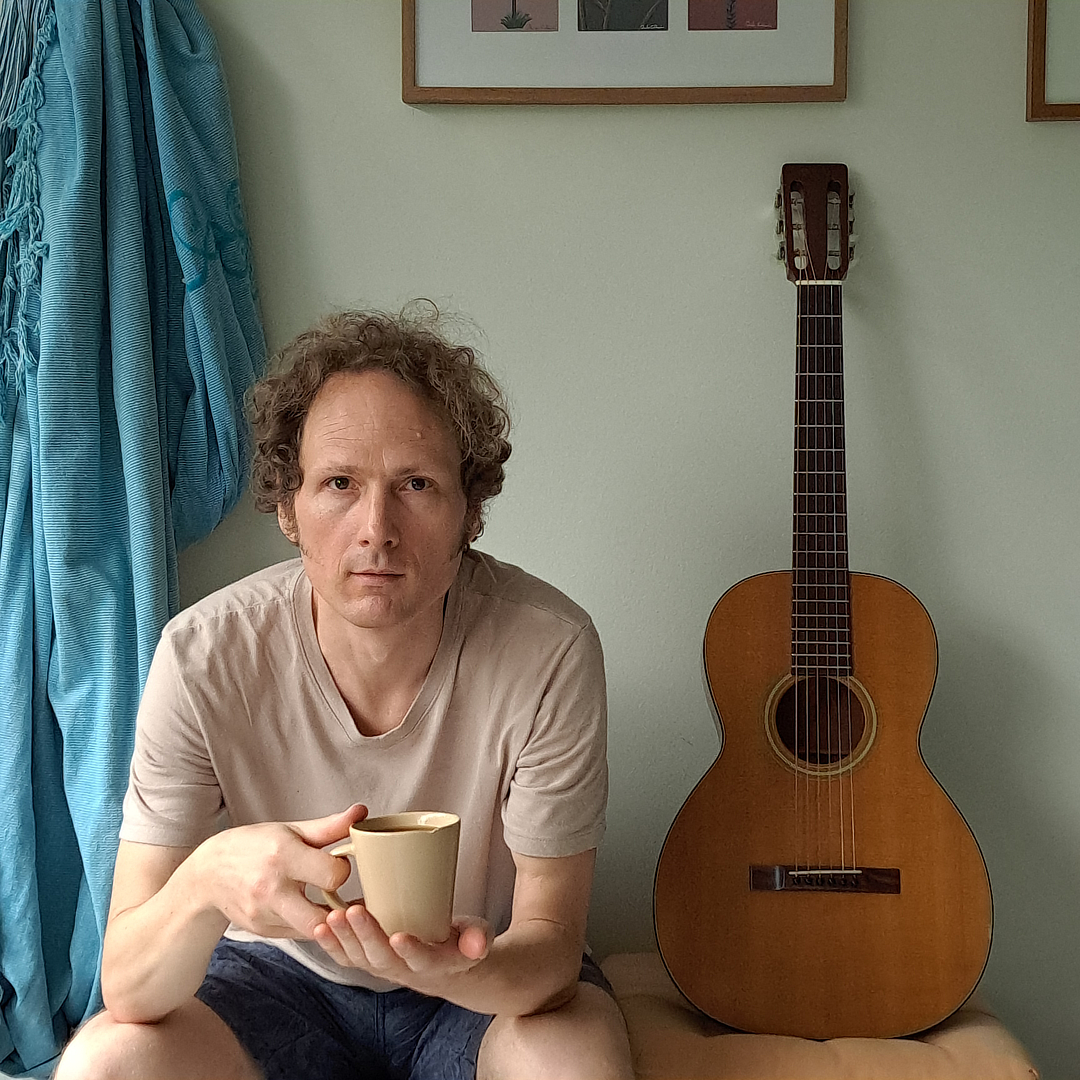
- Rivest in 2024

Background information
- Born: 1977 (age 47–48); Ontario, Canada
- Origin: Calgary, Alberta, Canada
- Genres: indie folk, rock, acoustic blues
- Occupation(s): singer-songwriter, guitarist, musician
- Instrument(s): vocals, guitar, mandolin
- Years active: 2005–present
- Labels: Jesse Rivest Music (independent)
- Website: jesserivest.com

Jesse Rivest (born 1977) is a Canadian singer-songwriter and guitarist. His hometown is Kelowna. He first surfaced in Calgary, and later was involved in music in New Zealand and Brazil. He currently divides his time between Canada and Brazil.

== Career ==
In 2005, Jesse Rivest was accepted as a "Best Newcomer Finalist" in the Calgary Folk Music Festival Songwriting Contest for his song Deadbeat Blues.

On April 13, 2007, he was the subject of a 41-minute, nationally-broadcast live interview and performance on Radio New Zealand (Jim Mora). He performed his songs Mesmerize Me, Worth the Wait, and Silent alongside cellist Rachael Linton. During the interview, he revealed that had been living and performing in Wellington. He also revealed some varied musical influences leading up to that time, including: Lester Quitzau, Xavier Rudd, Roy Orbison, and Joni Mitchell.

In February 2010, Rivest shared headlining the Waihi Bush Festival near Woodbury, New Zealand, with Kristina Olsen. Olsen joined Rivest onstage with slide guitar for his song Take It or Leave It.

In 2013, he held a Friday-night residency with his band, The Recent Developments, at Daddy O's in Wellington.

In 2016, an article in the Correio Braziliense revealed that Rivest had been studying music—in Brasília, DF, Brazil—via the bandolim for a year and half. That same year, a concert review published by Canal RIFF in Brazil further revealed that Rivest had been performing in Brasília.

In 2020, during the COVID-19 pandemic, he set up a recording studio in his apartment in Brasília and began producing singles. From there, he collaborated with Brasília-based jazz/pop artist, Tico de Moraes, releasing two cowritten and coproduced songs. One song, Wonderful Words, was included in Spotify's editorial playlist, Vocal Jazz.

In 2024, Rivest performed a solo concert at the Brasília National Library. Although the performance was of his own original repertoire and style, in the show's press release/interview he expressed an interest in Brazilian music, including the style choro and one of its pioneers, Jacob do Bandolim. He also expressed a love for Gilberto Gil's music.

Rivest also dabbles in photography/cinematography.

== Discography ==
- The Way Things Were (1997)
- Seventeen Oh-Two Oh-Six (2006)
- Live at the Mussel Inn – February 19, 2010 (2010)
- Everyelsewhere EP (2011)
- The D.G.B. EP (2020)
- Distant December (2023)
