= Onekaka =

Onekaka Onekakā (Māori)
- locality
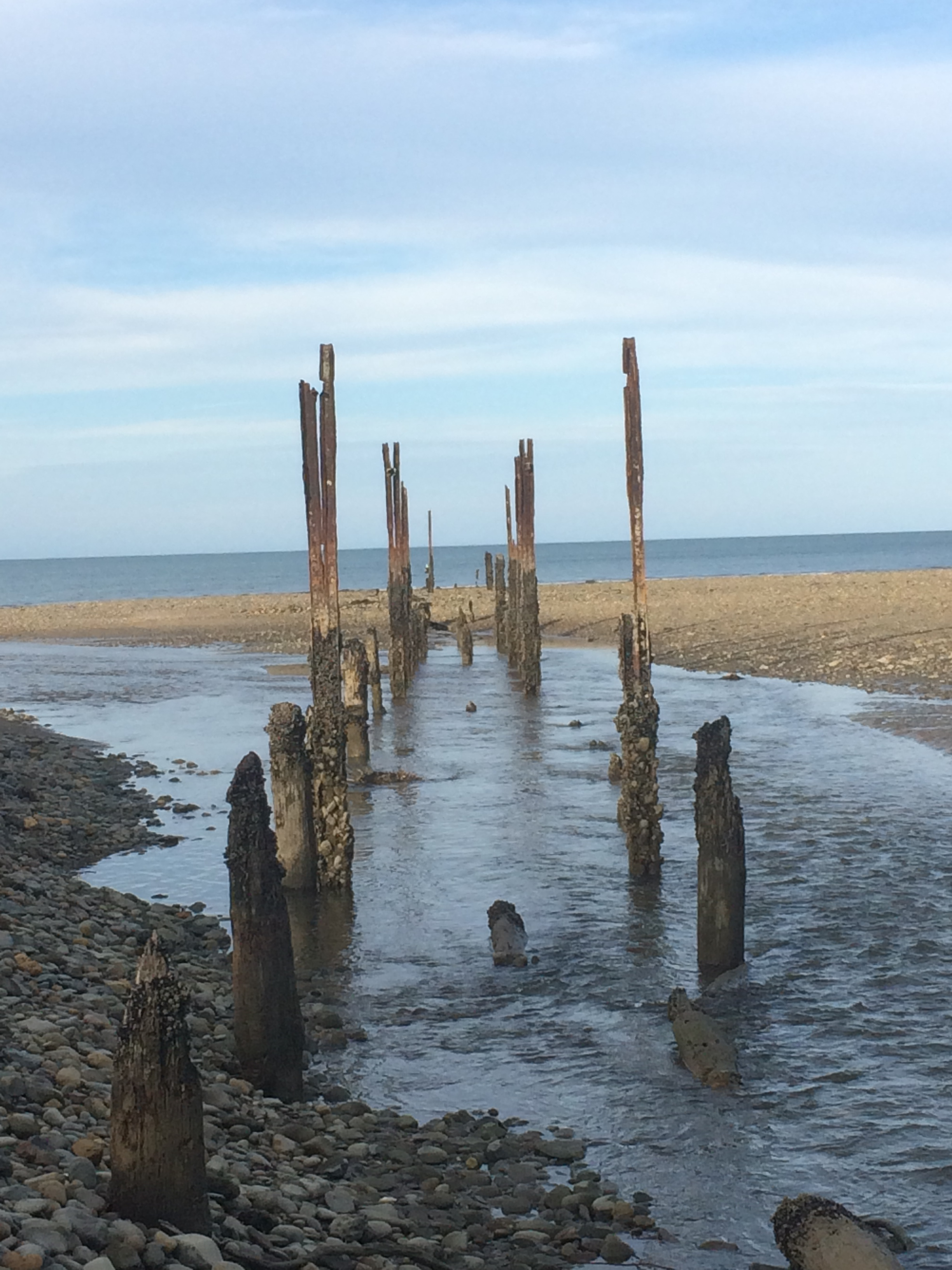
- Remnants of Onekaka Wharf
- Interactive map of Onekaka
- Coordinates: 40°45′54″S 172°42′27″E
- Country: New Zealand
- Territorial authority: Tasman
- Ward: Golden Bay
- Electorates: West Coast-Tasman; Te Tai Tonga (Māori)

Government
  - Territorial authority: Tasman District Council
  - Mayor of Tasman: Tim King
  - West Coast-Tasman MP: Maureen Pugh
  - Te Tai Tonga MP: Tākuta Ferris

Area
  - Total: 12.61 km^{2} (4.87 sq mi)

Population (2023 census)
  - Total: 186
  - Density: 14.8/km^{2} (38.2/sq mi)
- Time zone: UTC+12 (NZST)
  - Summer (DST): UTC+13 (NZDT)
- Postcode: 7182
- Area code: 03

Onekaka (Māori: Onekakā) is a rural district on the coast of Golden Bay, New Zealand.

The name Onekaka derives from the Māori language Onekakā, meaning red-hot or burning sand.

State Highway 60 runs through the district. Dairy farming is a major activity, occupying a large proportion of the land area. A significant number of artists and craftspeople live in the area. The Onekaka Hall Recreation Reserve is on the state highway opposite the Onekaka Iron Works Road and contains a community hall, stage and tennis court. The Mussel Inn, a popular Golden Bay pub and live music venue, is a short distance north from the main settlement along the highway.

A large ironworks was in operation in Onekaka by 1924, with a tramline that connected it to a wharf. It produced pig iron and pipes from limonite, which was mined there, and the operation employed up to 150 men. A small hydroelectric plant was built in 1929 to provide electricity for the pipe manufacturing. The works could not compete with iron produced overseas and closed in 1935. From 1937 to 1944, the hydroelectric plant produced power for Golden Bay. The plant was restarted by hydro enthusiasts in 2003 and produces 3.5 gigawatt-hours (13 TJ) annually for the national grid.

Onekaka School opened in a building moved from Rockville in 1924. Puramahoi School (extant 1905) merged with it in 1944. It closed in 1947. The building became a community hall.

A remnant of Onekaka Wharf and tramline remains on Washbourn Road and is a listed historic place. The wharf was a recurring theme in the art of prominent New Zealand painter Doris Lusk and one of these paintings has inspired Charles Brasch to write a poem. The wharf also features in a 1965 painting of Onekaka by Leo Bensemann.

== Demographics ==
Onekaka locality covers 12.61 km^{2} (4.87 sq mi) and includes the area between Ōtere River mouth and Pariwhakaoho River mouth. It is part of the larger Golden Bay / Mohua statistical area.

Historical population
Year	Pop.	±% p.a.
2006	132	—
2013	150	+1.84%
2018	144	−0.81%
2023	186	+5.25%

Onekaka had a population of 186 in the 2023 New Zealand census, an increase of 42 people (29.2%) since the 2018 census, and an increase of 36 people (24.0%) since the 2013 census. There were 81 males, 99 females, and 3 people of other genders in 75 dwellings. 11.3% of people identified as LGBTIQ+. The median age was 49.6 years (compared with 38.1 years nationally). There were 21 people (11.3%) aged under 15 years, 18 (9.7%) aged 15 to 29, 105 (56.5%) aged 30 to 64, and 42 (22.6%) aged 65 or older.

People could identify as more than one ethnicity. The results were 95.2% European (Pākehā), 3.2% Māori, and 8.1% other, which includes people giving their ethnicity as "New Zealander". English was spoken by 98.4%, Māori by 3.2%, and other languages by 21.0%. No language could be spoken by 1.6% (e.g. too young to talk). The percentage of people born overseas was 32.3, compared with 28.8% nationally.

Religious affiliations were 6.5% Christian, 1.6% Buddhist, and 1.6% New Age. People who answered that they had no religion were 75.8%, and 12.9% of people did not answer the census question.

Of those at least 15 years old, 57 (34.5%) people had a bachelor's or higher degree, 84 (50.9%) had a post-high school certificate or diploma, and 24 (14.5%) people exclusively held high school qualifications. The median income was $25,200, compared with $41,500 nationally. 12 people (7.3%) earned over $100,000 compared to 12.1% nationally. The employment status of those at least 15 was 57 (34.5%) full-time, 48 (29.1%) part-time, and 3 (1.8%) unemployed.

== Notable people ==
- Richard Washbourn – naval officer
