= Onekaka River =

River in Tasman District, New Zealand

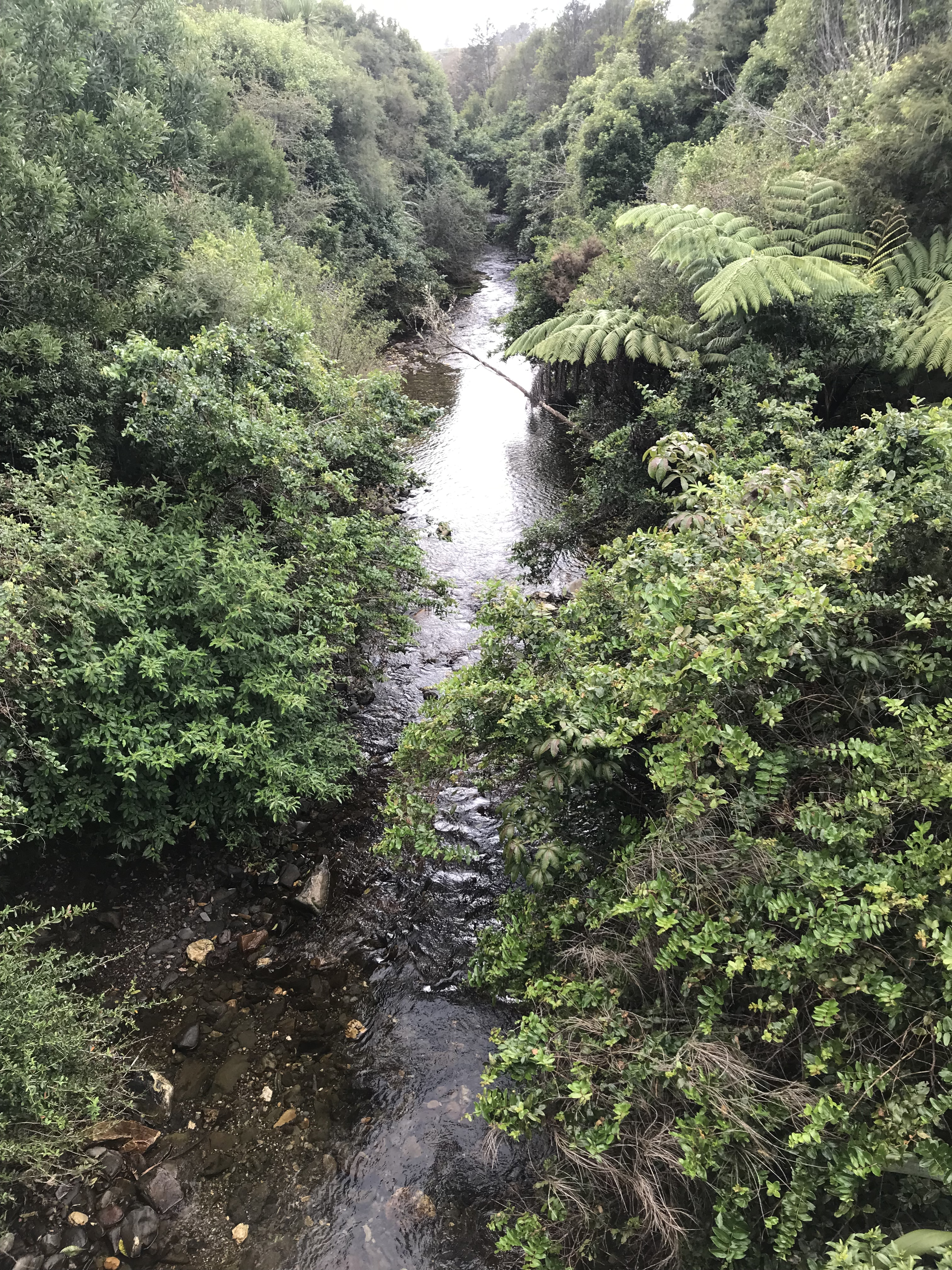
- Route of the Onekaka River

Location
- Country: New Zealand

Physical characteristics
- Source
  - coordinates: 40°48′17″S 172°41′03″E
- Mouth
  - location: Ōtere River
  - coordinates: 40°45′47″S 172°42′36″E
- Length: 8 kilometres (5.0 mi)

Basin features
- Progression: Onekaka River → Ōtere River → Golden Bay / Mohua → Tasman Sea
- Tributaries
  - right: Ironstone Creek

The Onekaka River is a river of the Tasman Region of New Zealand's South Island. It flows north from its sources in the northeast of Kahurangi National Park and south of Onekaka Iron Works Road, crossing under State Highway 60, before flowing into the Ōtere River some 13 km (8.1 mi) northwest of Tākaka in Golden Bay.

Onekaka Power Station is a small hydro-electric generating station operating on the river. The first power station on the river was built in 1928–29 to provide power for the Onekaka Ironworks. The station was rebuilt from 1995 using the original concrete arch dam, but with new penstocks, powerhouse and generating equipment. The new powerhouse was commissioned in 2003.

== See also ==
- List of rivers of New Zealand
