= Onekaka Power Station =

Hydro-electric power station in New Zealand

Onekaka Hydro Power Station
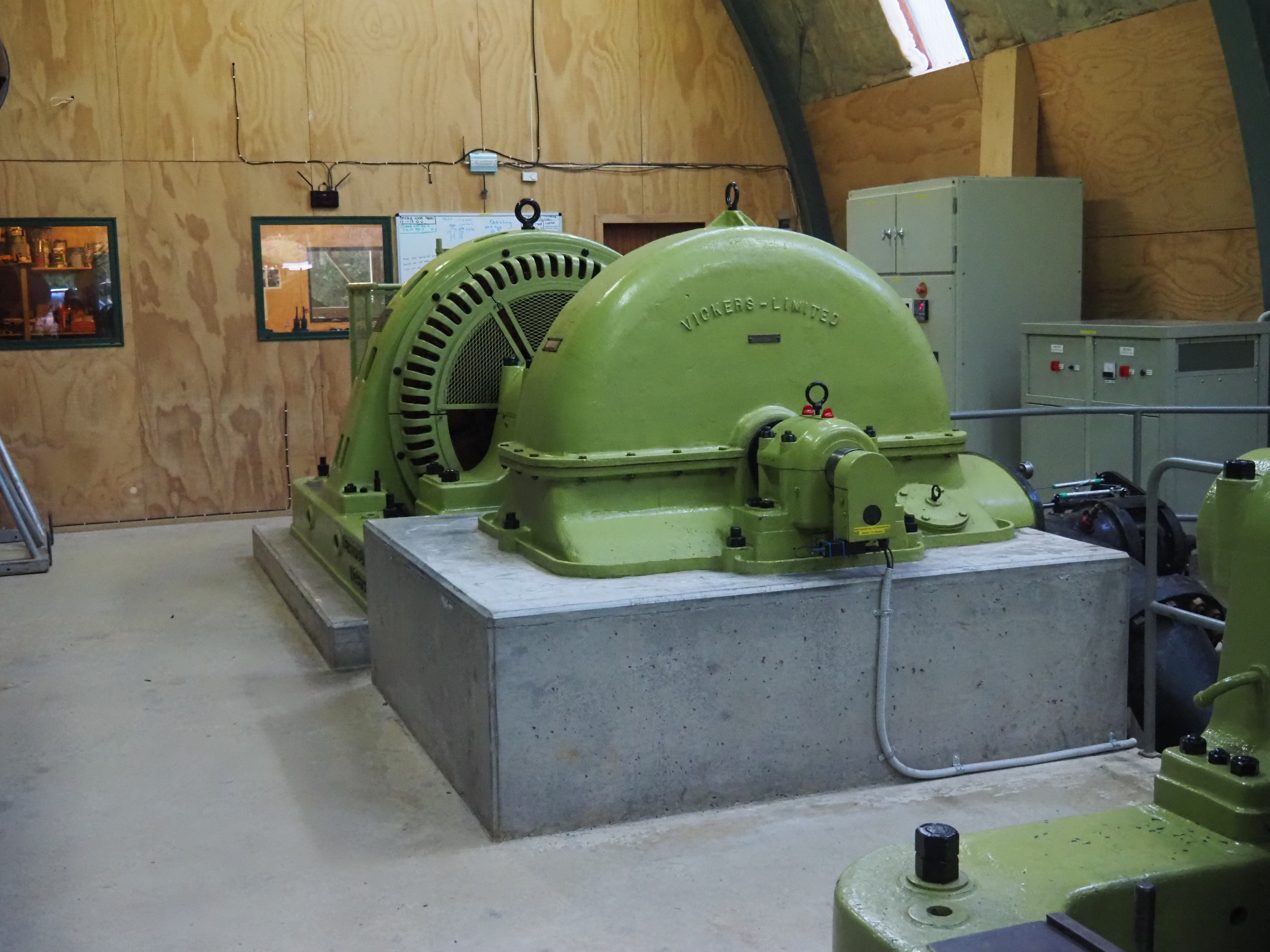
- One of the hydrogenerator sets in 2024
- Interactive map of Onekaka Hydro Power Station
- Country: New Zealand
- Location: Onekaka
- Coordinates: 40°46′56″S 172°41′15″E

Dam and spillways
- Type of dam: Concrete arch
- Height: 10 m (33 ft)

Power Station
- Operator: Onekaka Energy Ltd
- Commission date: November 2003
- Hydraulic head: 200 m (660 ft)
- Turbines: Two
- Installed capacity: 940 kW
- Annual generation: 3.8 GWh

Onekaka Power Station is a small hydro-electric generating station on the Onekaka River, in Golden Bay / Mohua, New Zealand. The first power station on the river was built in 1928–29 to provide power for the Onekaka Ironworks. The original scheme included a concrete arch dam 10 m (33 ft) high, a penstock 1.25 km (0.78 mi) long, and a powerhouse containing a Boving pelton wheel, rated at 250 kW.

After the Onekaka Ironworks closed, the power station remained in operation from 1937 to 1944, generating electricity for the Golden Bay area. The scheme was abandoned in the 1950s. A group of local hydro enthusiasts began work on a rebuild in 1995, and formed a company Onekaka Energy Ltd to manage the re-development and operation of the scheme. Up to 500 litres (110 imp gal; 130 US gal) a second would be diverted from the Onekaka River, and opponents expressed concerns that a reduction in minimum flows in the river would affect the native fish, the shortjaw kōkopu.

The new scheme uses the historic concrete arch dam, but a new penstock was built on the same alignment as the original. The new penstock extends a further 180 m (200 yd), to a new powerhouse downstream from the original site. New generating equipment for the scheme was obtained from salvage of two 500 kW auxiliary hydro-generator sets that had originally been used at the Tuai Power Station, a 60 MW station built as part of the Lake Waikaremoana scheme in the 1920s. The hydraulic head of the station is 200 m (660 ft) and the rated capacity of the new generating plant is 940 kW. It was commissioned in November 2003, and produces 3.5 GWh annually. The output is sold on the New Zealand electricity market. The scheme produces 10 to 20 percent of the electricity used in Golden Bay.

One unusual feature of this power station is that it is remotely monitored and controlled using text messages via the cellular phone network.

Onekaka Power Station

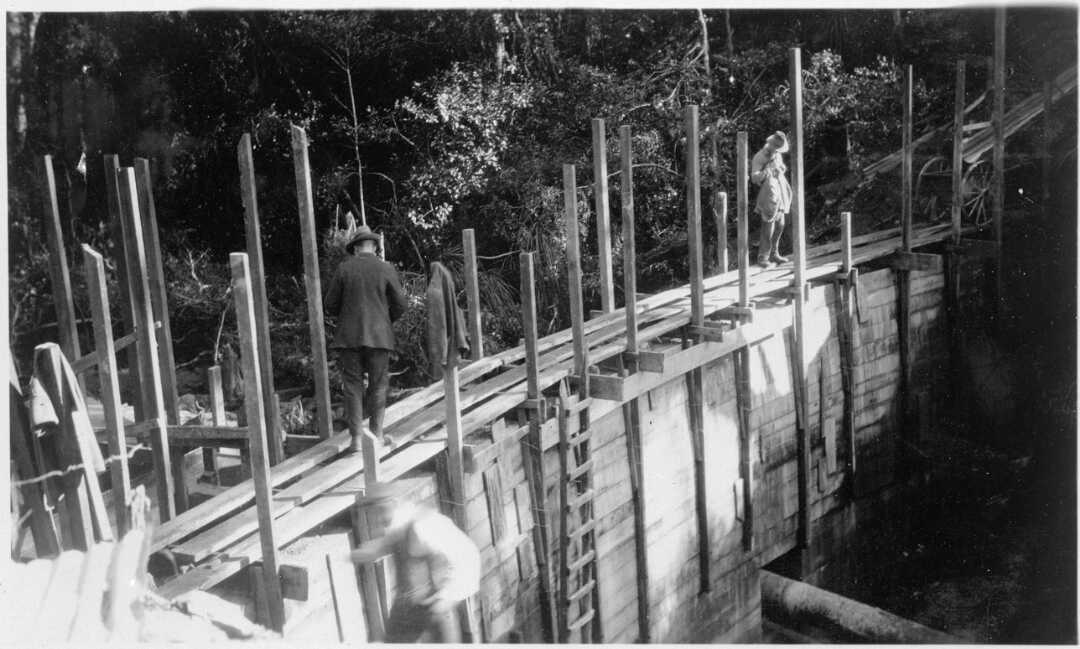
Onekaka Dam under construction in the late 1920s

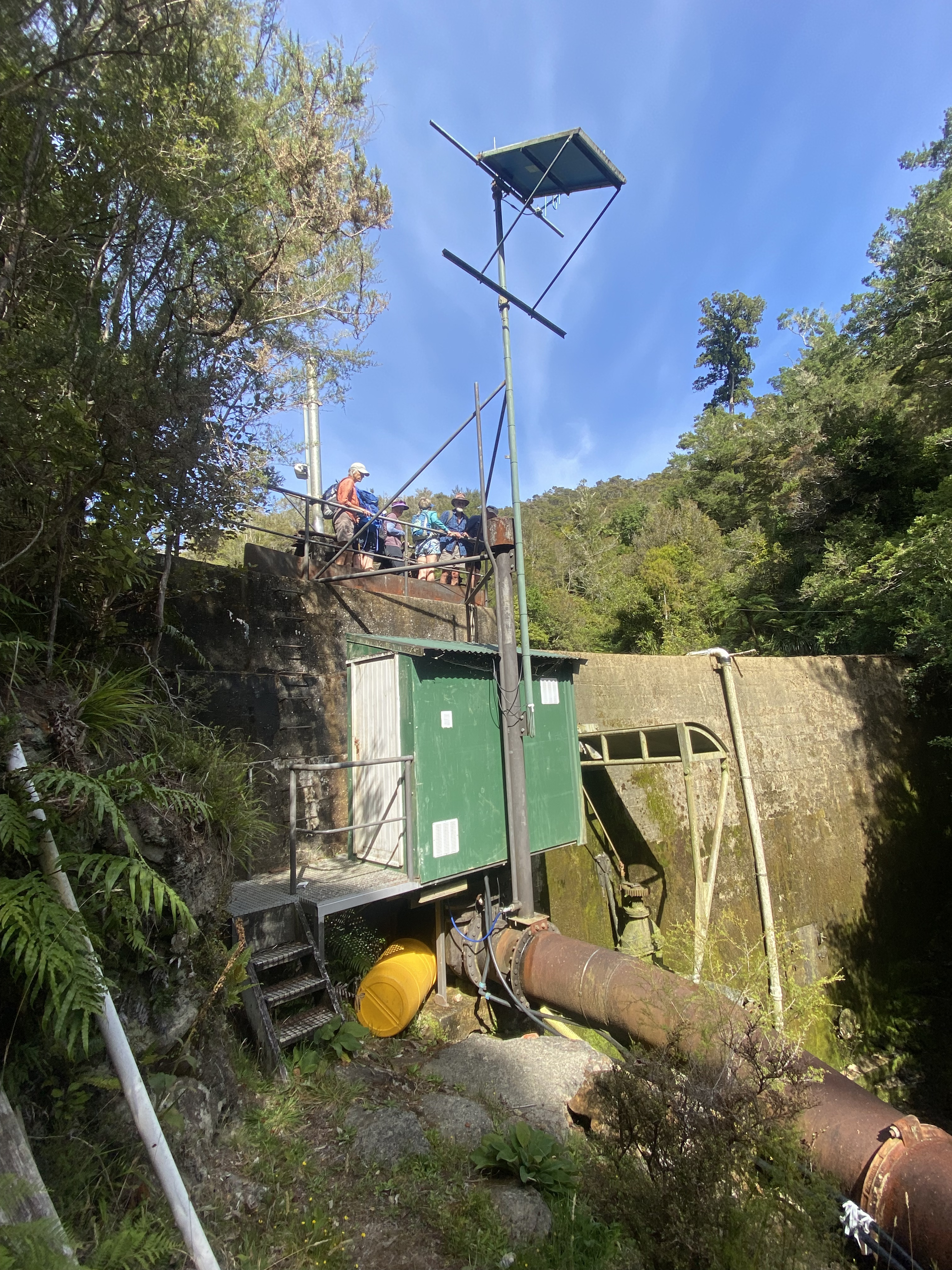
Onekaka Dam in 2024

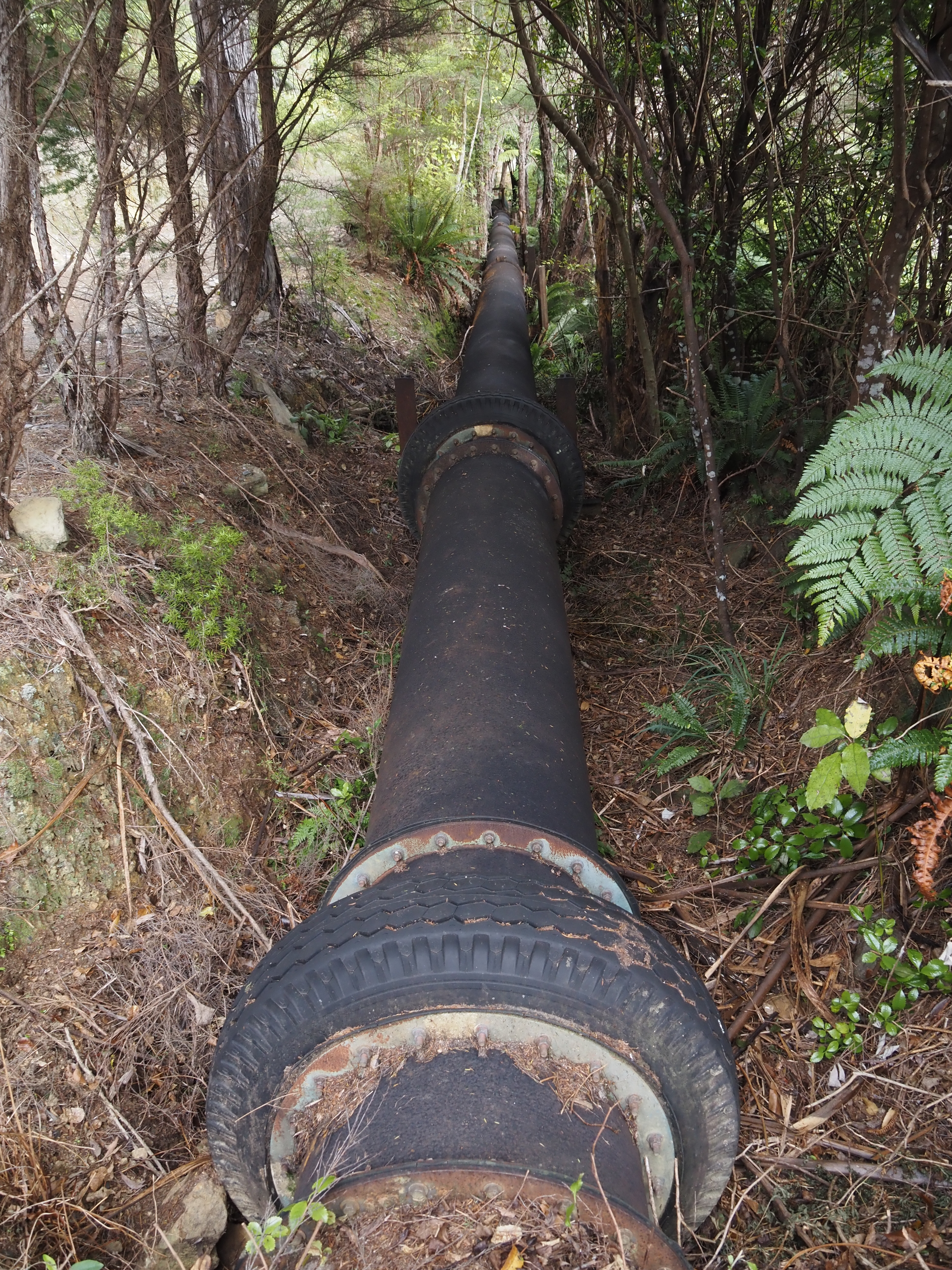
Penstock section

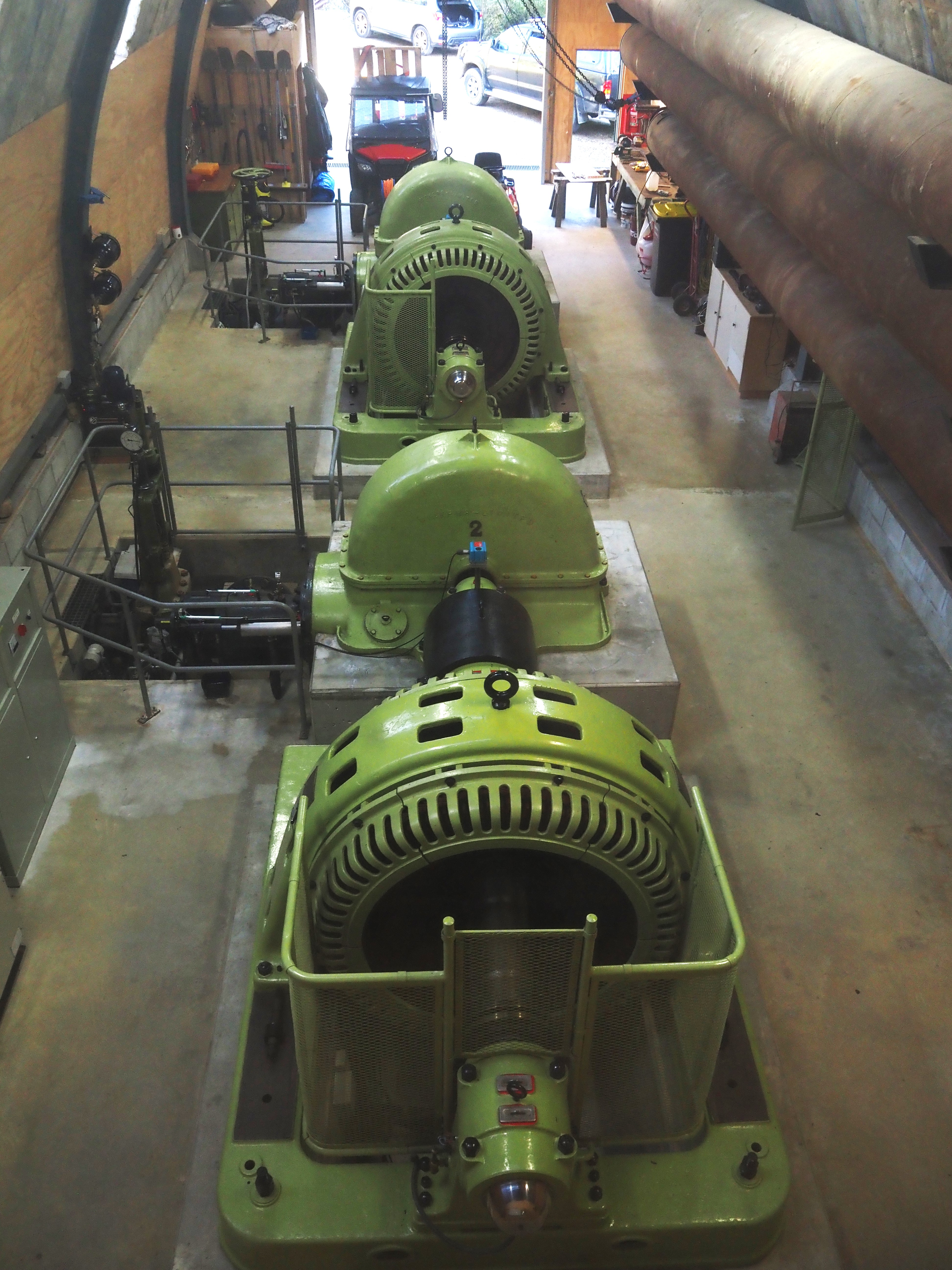
View of hydro-generators

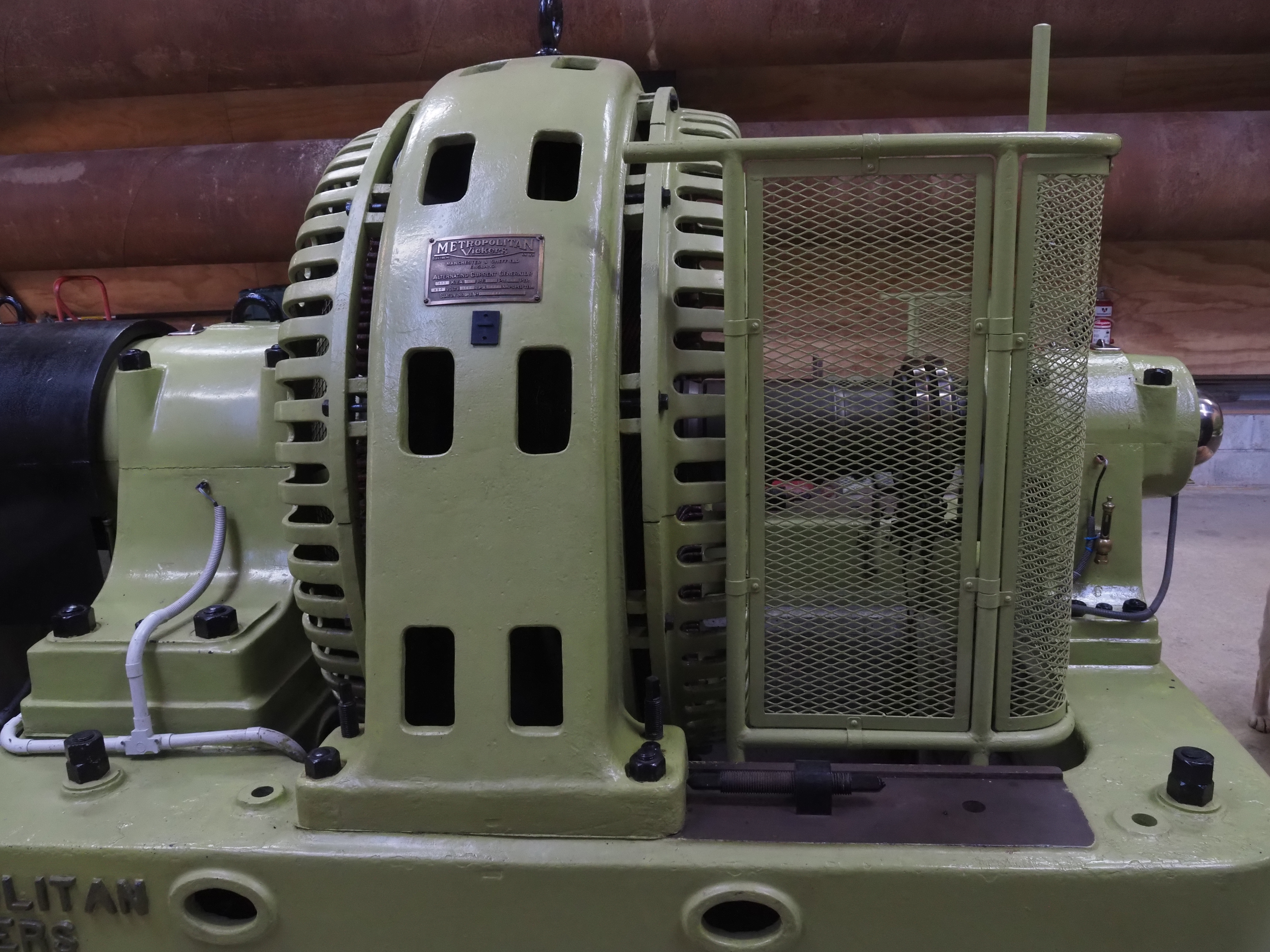
Generator

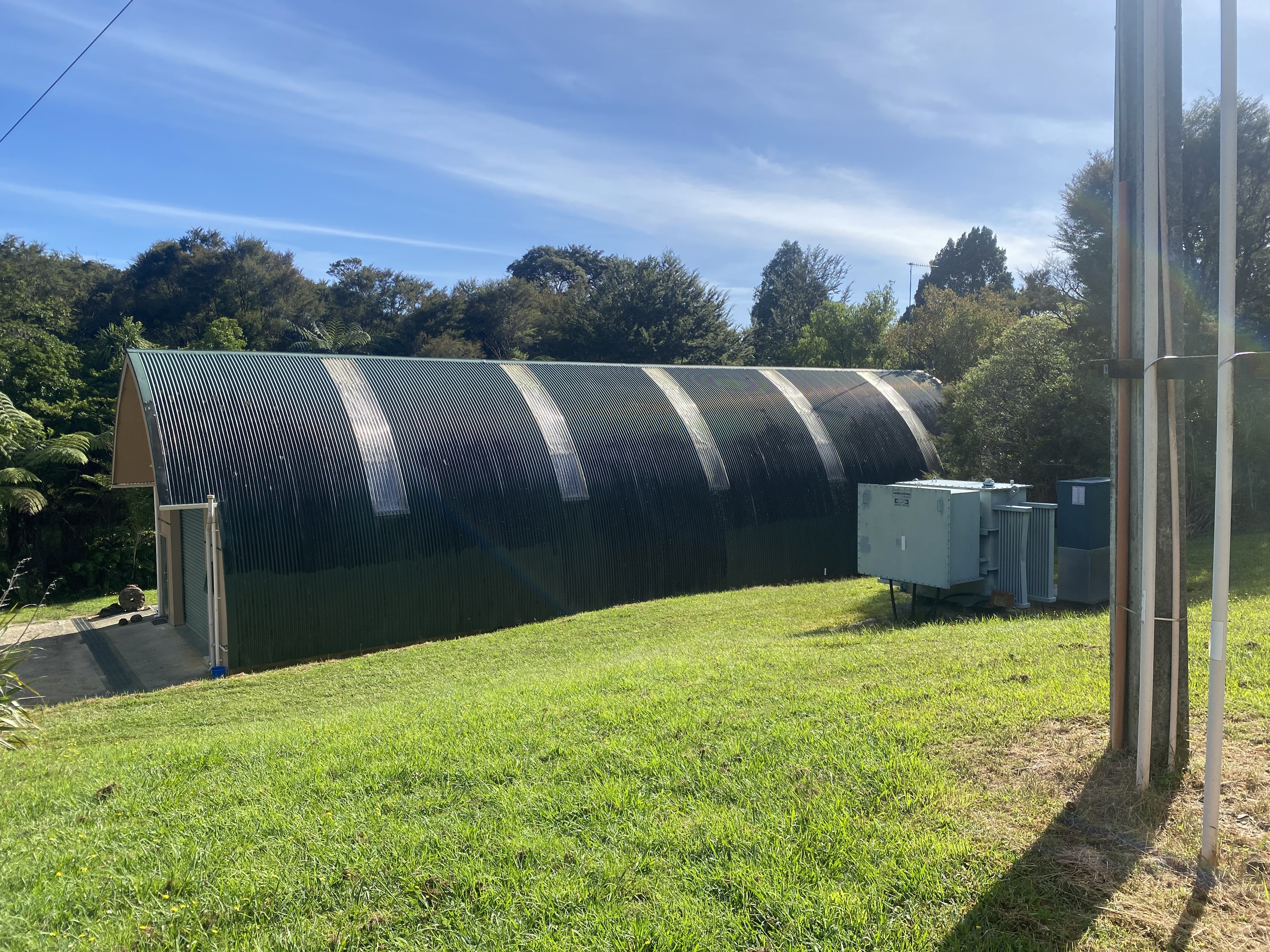
Power station building
