= Ōtere River =

River in Tasman District, New Zealand

- The Ōtere River at the Shambhala driveway (looking downstream)
- Route of the Ōtere River
- Mouth of the Ōtere River Ōtere River (South Island)

Location
- Country: New Zealand

Physical characteristics
- Source
  - coordinates: 40°48′00″S 172°42′08″E
- Mouth
  - location: Golden Bay / Mohua
  - coordinates: 40°49′36″S 172°36′52″E
- Length: 6 kilometres (3.7 mi)

Basin features
- Progression: Ōtere River → Golden Bay / Mohua → Tasman Sea
- Tributaries
  - left: Onekaka River, Mulligan Creek

The Ōtere River is a short river of the Tasman Region of New Zealand's South Island. It flows north to reach Golden Bay approximately halfway between Tākaka and Collingwood, flowing into an inlet at the remnants of Onekaka Wharf.

== See also ==
- List of rivers of New Zealand
