= Pariwhakaoho River =

River in Tasman District, New Zealand

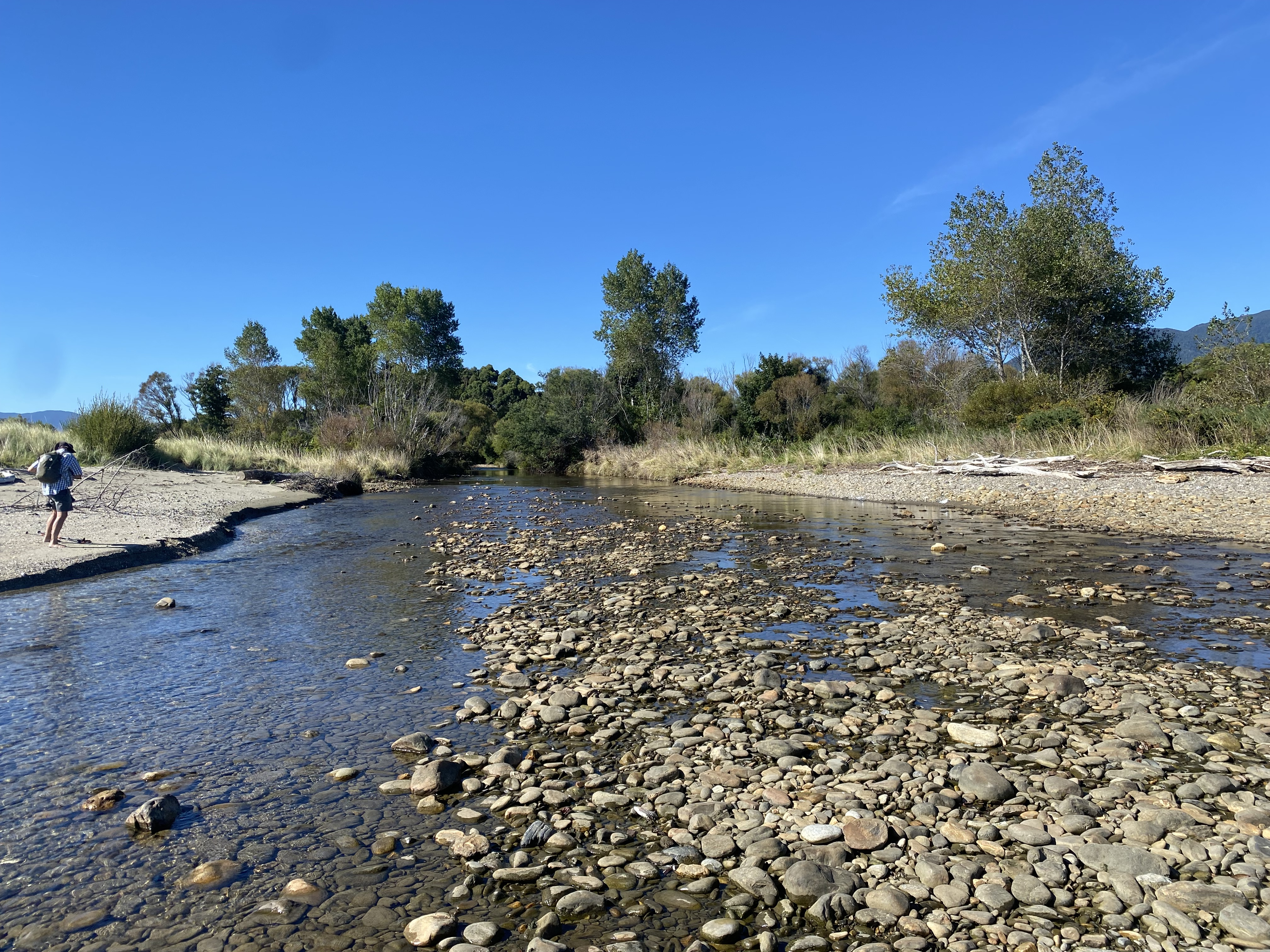
- Route of the Pariwhakaoho River
- Mouth of the Pariwhakaoho River Pariwhakaoho River (South Island)

Location
- Country: New Zealand

Physical characteristics
- Source
  - coordinates: 40°50′30″S 172°40′34″E
- Mouth
  - location: Golden Bay / Mohua
  - coordinates: 40°46′27″S 172°44′21″E
- Length: 13 kilometres (8.1 mi)

Basin features
- Progression: Pariwhakaoho River → Golden Bay / Mohua → Tasman Sea
- Tributaries
  - left: Carbonate Creek, Diorite Creek, Taipō Creek, Turnbull Creek, Camp Creek
  - right: Break-me-up Creek, Flowers Creek, Copperstain Creek

The Pariwhakaoho River is a river of the Tasman Region of New Zealand's South Island. It flows northeast from sources within Kahurangi National Park to reach Golden Bay 10 kilometres northwest of Tākaka at Puramāhoi.

== See also ==
- List of rivers of New Zealand
