= Kristina Olsen =

American singer-songwriter

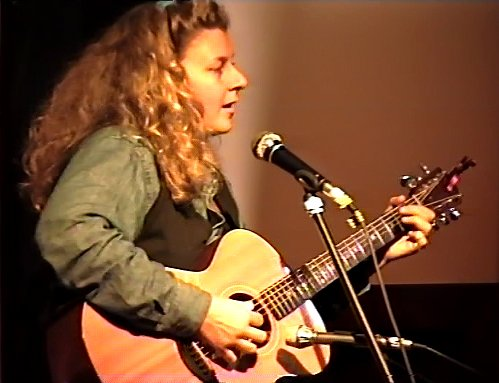
- Olsen in 1997

Background information
- Born: May 26, 1957 (age 68); San Francisco, California, US
- Genres: Folk, Blues
- Years active: 1980s–present
- Website: http://www.kristinaolsen.net/

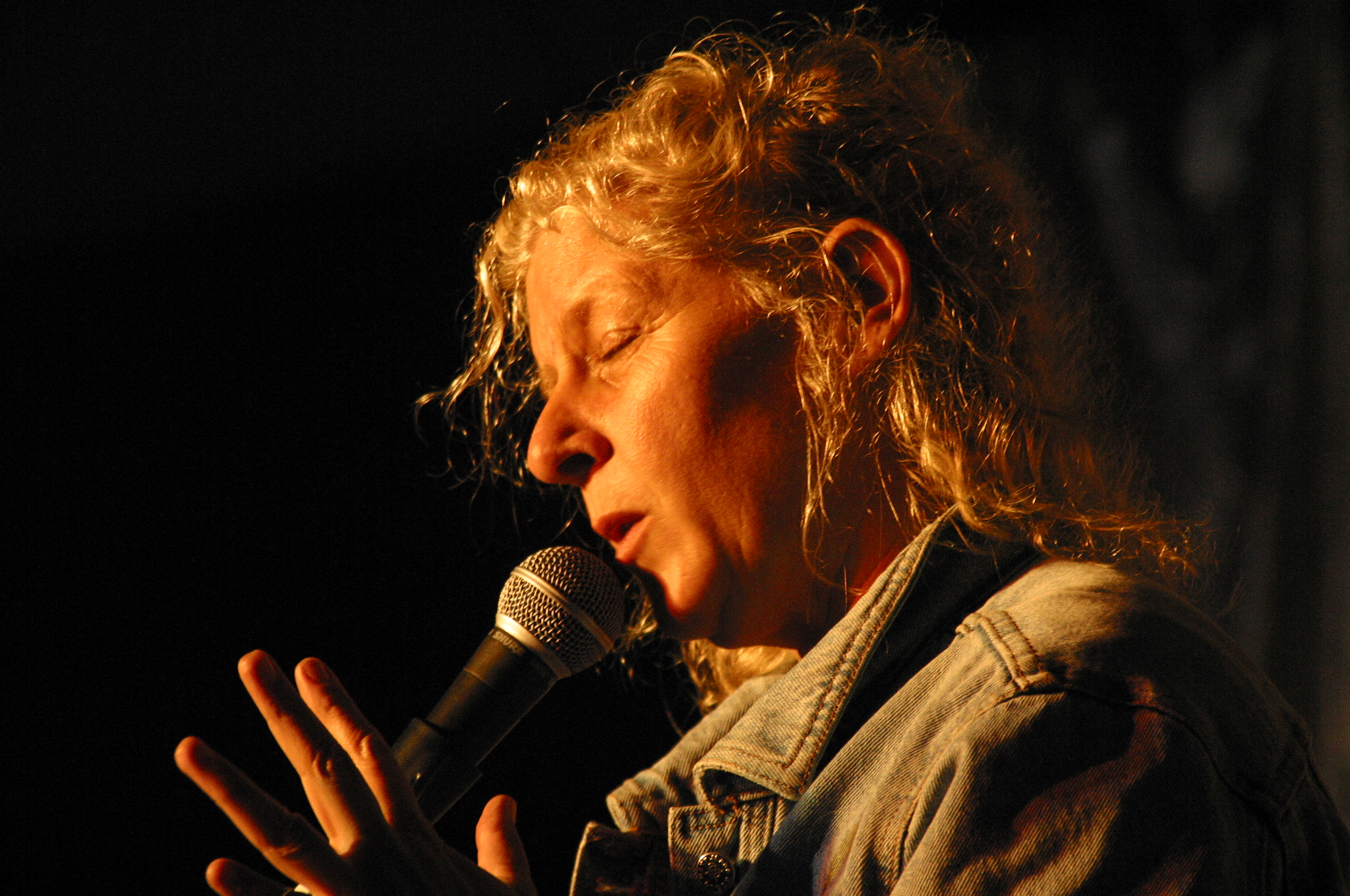
Kristina Olsen performs at Blue Mountains Music Festival, Katoomba NSW Australia, in March 2006

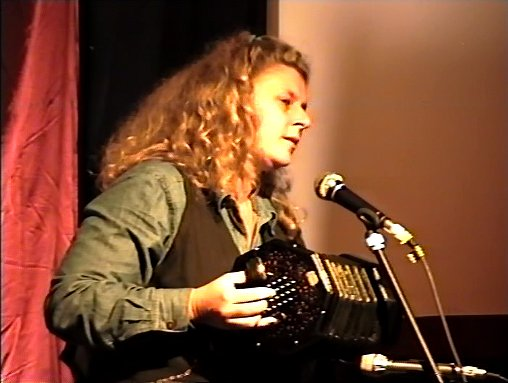
Olsen accompanying herself on English concertina

Kristina Olsen (born May 26, 1957) is an American folk singer-songwriter and multi-instrumentalist who also incorporates influences from acoustic blues. As at 2022 she has released 13 albums (four on the recognised independent label Philo Records); all of her Philo albums achieved between 3 and 4 stars (represented as dog bones) in the 1998 MusicHound Folk:Essential Album Guide. On her Philo albums her accompanying musicians include U.S. guitarist Nina Gerber while several of her later albums include collaborations with the Australian cellist Peter Grayling. Her 2014 album Chemistry is a collaboration with U.S. guitarist Peter Snell who has previously worked with the well known songwriter and performer Lyle Lovett. Olsen is also noted for her extensive touring schedule both nationally and internationally.

== Biography ==
Olsen was born in San Francisco, U.S., and raised in Haight-Ashbury during the 1960s, where she was exposed to a variety of musical styles. Commencing a career as a songwriter and accompanying herself on guitar and other instruments, she won the "New Folk" contest at the Kerrville (Texas) Folk Festival in 1985. Her first two releases It Don't Take Too Much and Cupid Is Stupid (the second billed as by "Kristina Olsen & The Loose String Band") were released in 1983 and 1985 on her own label. Commencing in 1992 she recorded 4 albums for Philo Records which were well received critically, with Kristina Olsen and Love, Kristina both receiving 3 stars (dog bones), Hurry On Home 3 and a half stars, and Live from Around the World four stars in the comprehensive MusicHound Folk: The Essential Album Guide encyclopedia of the folk music genre. Subsequent to her stint with Philo, she has released eight further albums plus a DVD; as at 2022 her latest album release is "Sweet Stillness" from 2016. Olsen is noted for her frequent overseas touring which has included tours in Australia, Scotland, England, Bangladesh (for a benefit concert), New Zealand, Canada and the USA.

Olsen writes songs loosely in the folk/acoustic singer-songwriter genre but incorporates influences from blues and jazz; she has a particular regard for the songs of blues artist Robert Johnson and often incorporates one or two of his numbers in her live performances, accompanying herself on bottleneck resonator guitar. For most of her own songs, she uses regular acoustic guitar but also incorporates piano, banjo and concertina as accompanying instruments. According to Allmusic, in addition to guitar and piano, she plays 13 other instruments.

In an appraisal of her self-titled 1992 album, reviewer William Echard wrote: "Olsen plays modern acoustic folk-rock, at times firmly rooted in the blues ... Her voice is strong and husky, almost a rock voice, and her lyrics are clever but not overly complicated, always directly honing in to a wry and distinctive perspective ... This record as a whole is innovative, assertive, and subtle."

Reviewing Live Around The World (1997), Stephen Ide wrote in Dirty Linen: "She tells stories of trekking through Alaska on snowmobiles to gigs or of dancing with a drunk, and then sings everything from sweet, passionate piano ballads to rollicking folk-rock or growling, raucous blues. For Kristina Olsen, the message is personal and delivered with fire."

Reviewing her 2008 release Quiet Blue for Trad and Now magazine, Tony Smith wrote: "As always, it is Kristina Olsen's voice, complemented by guitar, which will win new admirers. Sometimes she growls out the lyrics in vampish blues style, but at others, the delivery is close to the folk ballad style. ... This is certainly music for grown-ups, but Kristina Olsen has a playful and youthful approach which means there is nothing heavy in her songs ... We should all take our time listening to this superb songwriter."

Pamela Murray Winters, in the MusicHound's Folk Essential Album Guide, writes: "Her music and manner are unabashedly warm and inviting. Olsen is a folk singer in the most literal sense of "folk"; even in the throes of bluesy longing, her voice and delivery draw the listener into the circle." Several of her songs have been covered by other artists including "If I stayed" by Eric Bibb on his 2004 album Friends, "Dangerous" by Fairport Convention on their 1997 album Who Knows Where the Time Goes?, also on Kind Fortune (2000), "Truth of a Woman" by Maddy Prior on Under the Covers, 2005, "Mary Mary" (co-written with Coughlan) by Mary Coughlan on The Whole Affair: The Very Best of Mary Coughlan (2012) and "Practicing Walking Away" by Mollie O'Brien on Things I Gave Away (2000).

== Discography ==
- It Don't Take Too Much (Take A Break Productions, 1983)
- Cupid Is Stupid (by Kristina Olsen & The Loose String Band) (Take A Break Productions, 1985)
- Kristina Olsen (Philo, 1992) - featuring Nina Gerber (guitar), Cary Black (bass) plus others
- Love, Kristina (Philo, 1993) - featuring Nina Gerber (guitar), Cary Black (bass), Joe Craven (percussion) plus others
- Hurry On Home (Philo, 1995) - featuring Nina Gerber (guitar), Joe Craven) (percussion) plus others
- Live From Around the World (Philo, 1997) - featuring Nina Gerber (guitar), Ed Johnson & Kim Scanlon (harmony vocals), Al Petteway (guitar)
- Duet (by Kristina Olsen and Peter Grayling) (self released, 1998)
- Truth of a Woman (Take A Break Productions, 1999) - featuring Peter Grayling (cello, mandocello, mandolin & harmony vocals)
- All Over Down Under ("by Kristina Olsen with Peter Grayling and George Butrumlis") (Take A Break Productions, 2002)
- In Your Darkened Room (Take A Break Productions, 2004) - featuring Peter Grayling (cello, mandolin), Paul Elliott (violin), George Butrumlis (accordion), Ed Johnson (harmony vocals)
- Kristina Olsen & Peter Grayling Live DVD (2004)
- Quiet Blue (Take A Break Productions, 2008) - featuring mandolinist Al Hughes and drummer Scott Hills
- They Paid Us in Tub Time (Audiobook/Ebook) (Take A Break Productions, 2013)
- Chemistry (by Kristina Olsen and Pete Snell) (Take A Break Productions, 2014)
- Sweet Stillness (Take A Break Productions, 2016) - featuring Bill Coon
