= Onekaka Wharf and tramline =

Heritage location in New Zealand

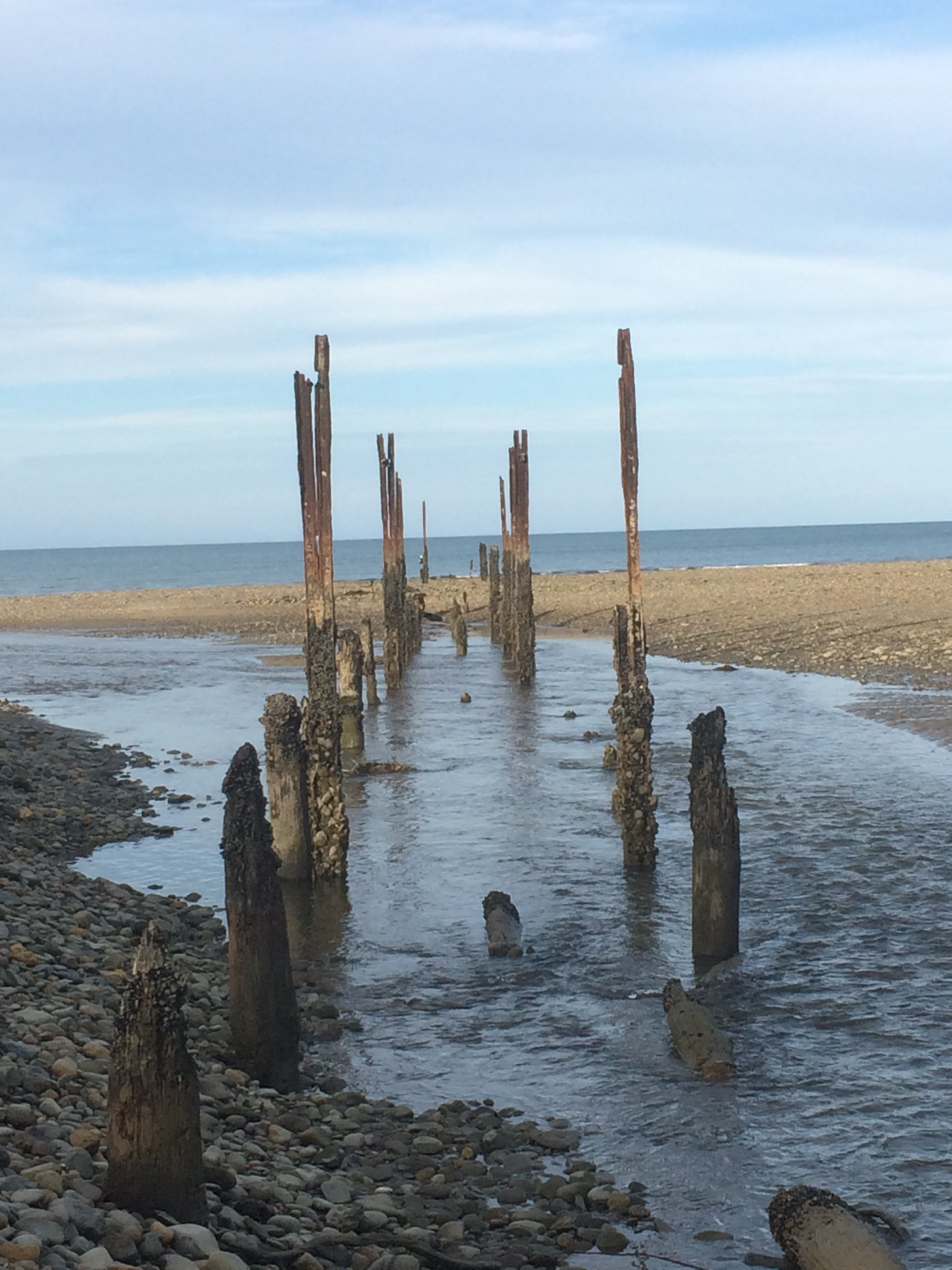
- Onekaka Wharf
- Interactive map of Onekaka Wharf and tramline
- Type: Remnants of a wharf and tramline
- Location: Onekaka, New Zealand
- Coordinates: 40°44′46″S 172°42′39″E
- Built: 1923 and 1924
- Owner: Onakaka Iron and Steel Company

Heritage New Zealand – Category 2
- Official name: Onekaka Ironworks Wharf and Tramline Piles
- Designated: 2 February 1990
- Reference no.: 5126

The Onekaka Wharf and tramline is a registered heritage item in Golden Bay / Mohua's Onekaka in New Zealand. The infrastructure was built in 1923 and 1924 to service the Onekaka Ironworks. The wharf was last used in 1945 before it was damaged in a storm. The remnants of the wharf and tramline share an entry on the Heritage New Zealand register under the name Onekaka Ironworks Wharf and Tramline Piles.

== Background ==
James Bell, as director of the New Zealand Geological Survey, undertook a survey in the foothills behind Onekaka and Parapara from September 1906 to April 1907. The limonite deposits, an iron ore, had long been known about. Bell was impressed by the purity of the limonite and the vast amount that was easily accessible. He wrote:

It is remarkable that the great deposit of iron-ore at Parapara, so well known for many years, should have remained practically untouched up to the present time.

Later on, Bell claimed that the limonite deposits were the largest in the world.

The metallurgist John Heskett had experimented with producing iron from Taranaki ironsand. When that failed, Heskett turned his attention to the limonite in Onekaka instead. He raised £NZ80,000 in capital, founded the Onakaka (Note: Onekaka is a Māori word and the company, whose directors were mostly in England, chose a phonetic spelling so that the place name could be pronounced by English speakers unfamiliar with the Māori language.) Iron and Steel Company, relocated his 16.8 m-high (55 ft) blast furnace from Taranaki, and started building the Onekaka Ironworks. An early initiative for this project was to build a wharf and tramline to get access to the ironworks.

== Construction and demise ==
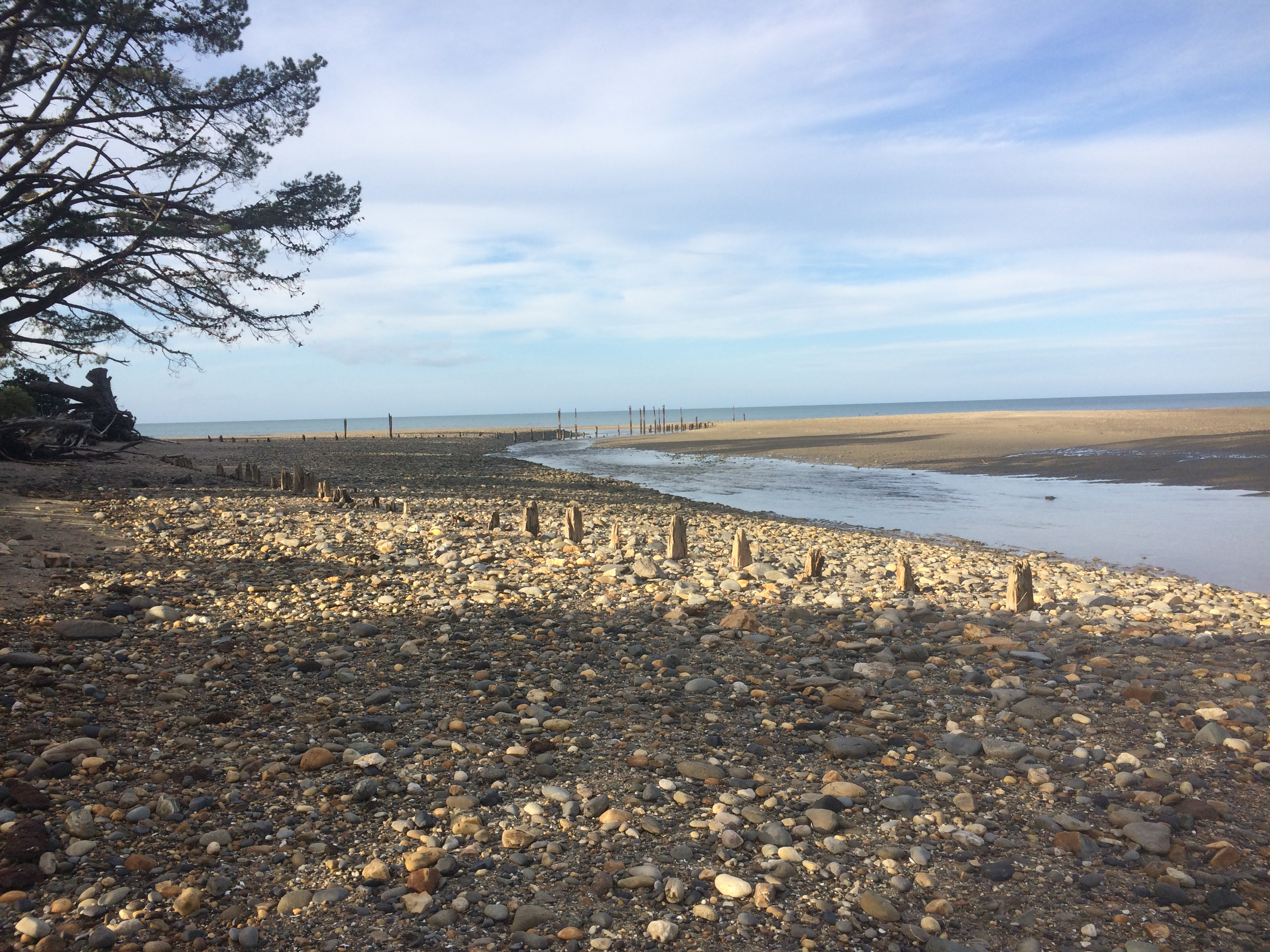
Tramline piles in the foreground, with wharf remnants in the distance

Initially, the company used Skilton's wharf, a private jetty at Onekaka Inlet. Construction of the company's own wharf and associated tramline commenced in 1923 and by the following year, the facilities had been completed. The length of the wharf was 365 m (1,198 ft); at the time, it was the longest wharf in the country. However, the wharf piles were untreated locally felled timber (Nothofagus solandri) and within two or three years, had deteriorated significantly due to an infestation by shipworms. The structure was strengthened by driving tram rails from Wellington alongside the piles, and using these metal rails as additional bracing.

The Onekaka Ironworks struggled financially during the Great Depression and the company was put into liquidation in May 1935. During World War II, the ironworks were reconditioned in case New Zealand was cut off from iron imports, and this included reinstatement of the wharf. The ironworks were never fired up again, though. Since its reinstatement, the wharf had been used for the export of dolomite, a fertiliser locally mined at Mount Burnett. In a storm on 22 November 1945, about 12 m (40 ft) of the wharf near its sea-end collapsed, and some 150 tons of dolomite rock fell into the water, which was 4.3 m (14 ft) deep at high tide. The submerged rocks made it dangerous for ships to approach the wharf, and this caused the wharf to be abandoned.

In the early 1950s, the New Zealand government gave up on ever producing iron again at Onekaka and all facilities were abandoned.

=== Later history ===
Doris Lusk (1916–1990), a painter and art teacher, first came to Onekaka in 1965. At the time, the wharf had deteriorated, with a section at the low tide line missing due to differential wave forces. Lusk took this landscape as her main subject for the next five years. Paintings by Lusk of the Onekaka Wharf are held by the Christchurch Art Gallery, Te Papa, and The Suter Art Gallery.

On 2 February 1990, the remnants of the Onekaka Wharf and tramline were registered with the New Zealand Historic Places Trust (now Heritage New Zealand) as a Category II structure with registration number 5126.
