= Mussel Inn =

New Zealand music venue and pub

- Mussel Inn logo

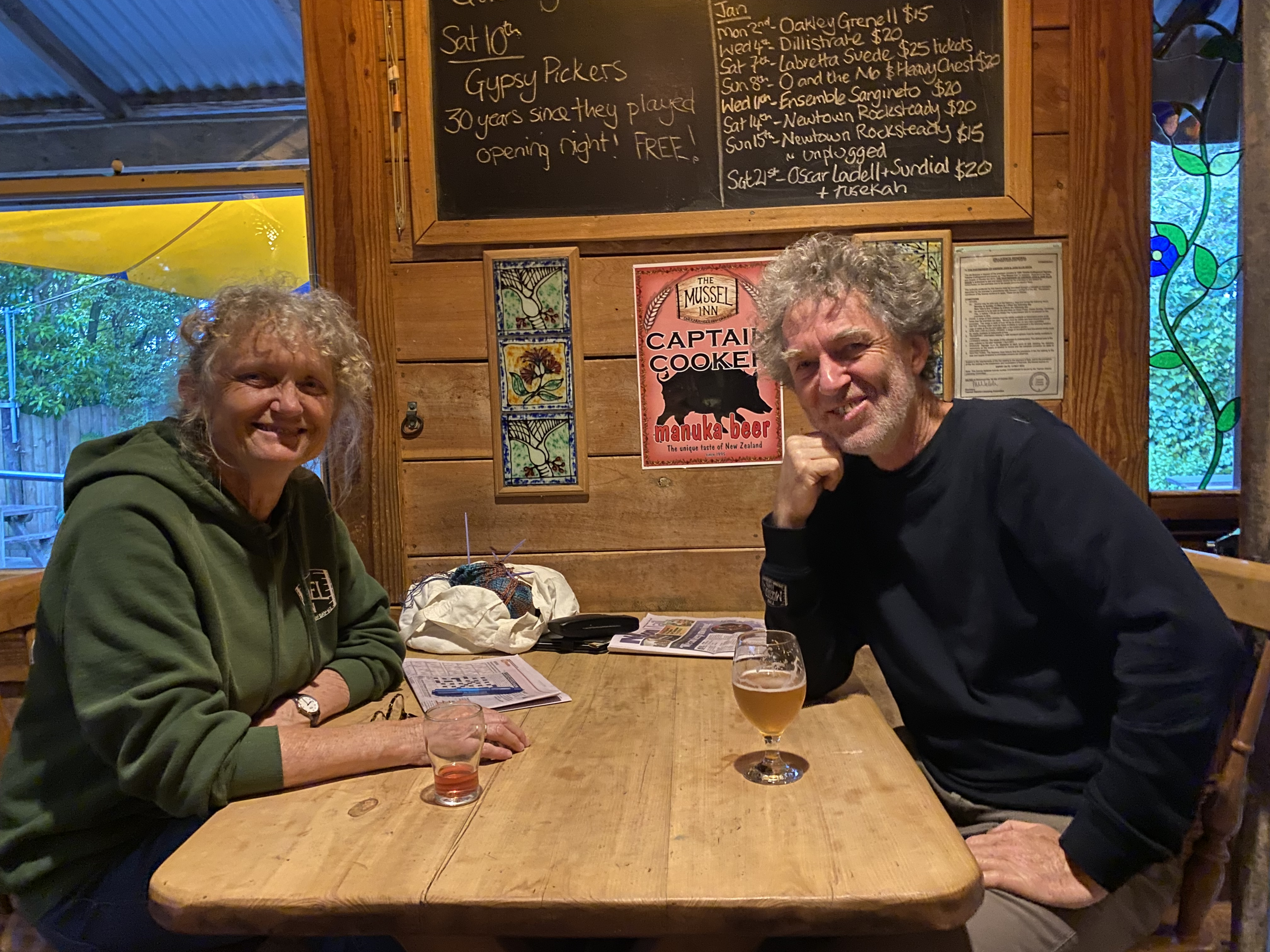
- Proprietors Jane and Andrew Dixon of the Mussel Inn, Onekaka
- Formation: 1992
- Founders: Andrew Dixon, Jane Dixon
- Location: New Zealand
- Website: www.musselinn.co.nz

The Mussel Inn is a brewery bar, restaurant and entertainment venue in Onekaka, in Golden Bay / Mohua in New Zealand. The business was founded by Andrew and Jane Dixon in 1992.

== About ==
The Mussel Inn's first day of operation was 3 December 1992, with live music by Ron and Lindy Valente; the brewery operations started three years later. The owners and operators of the Mussel Inn are Andrew and Jane Dixon, who started it because there was nowhere for people to go to socialise with family and friends. Andrew Dixon's background was as a home brewer of beer, and Andrew and Jane often hosted friends who stopped by for fresh mussels and home-brew. Their focus was on creating a venue for local people with Andrew Dixon saying, "the tourists are kind of the cream on the cake". Over time, other members of the Dixon family have also worked at the Mussel Inn, including sons Henry and Toby.

Since its inception, the establishment has offered a range of events including live music and quiz nights. On the occasion of the venue's 30th birthday, Henry Dixon said: "The birthdays, the wakes, and those moments when people gather on Friday nights... it's community... it's more than a big gig".

Andrew and Jane Dixon have focused on a sustainable ethos and refrained from expanding or changing things much. In 2006, the Mussel Inn won a national Green Ribbon award for environmentally sustainable business from the Ministry for the Environment. The business uses solar power, and recycles and reuses bottles in its on-site production of soft drink, wine and beer. The founders of the business have been members of the Onekaka Biodiversity Group, supporting pest control and native planting. They also participate in the Sustainable Business Network.

Tasman District Council served an abatement notice to the Mussel Inn on 20 December 2018, trying to restrict numbers to 50 patrons at any one time over traffic safety concerns. The owners (the Dixons) took the issue to the Environment Court, where the council’s notice was overturned. The Dixons were ordered by the Environment Court to apply for a new resource consent.

In 2022, the National Library of New Zealand added 806 posters advertising live acts at the Mussel Inn to its Archive of New Zealand Music, with many of the posters designed by Andrew Dixon.

=== Live music ===
As a live music venue, there is a range of New Zealand international artists performing including emerging musicians. There is often a year-long waiting list of bands wanting a spot to perform. Artists who have performed at the Mussel Inn include Age Prior, Anika Moa, Anna Coddington, Don McGlashan and Upper Hutt Posse.

Jane Dixon pouring a beer

=== Beer ===
The Mussel Inn was amongst the first craft brewers in New Zealand and amongst only a few that have lasted as long, Reuben Lee, the company's brewer, joined the company around 1997. Well known beers are The Golden Goose and Captain Cooker, which is a mānuka flavoured brew. Water for the brewing comes from the local stream.

=== Buildings and design ===
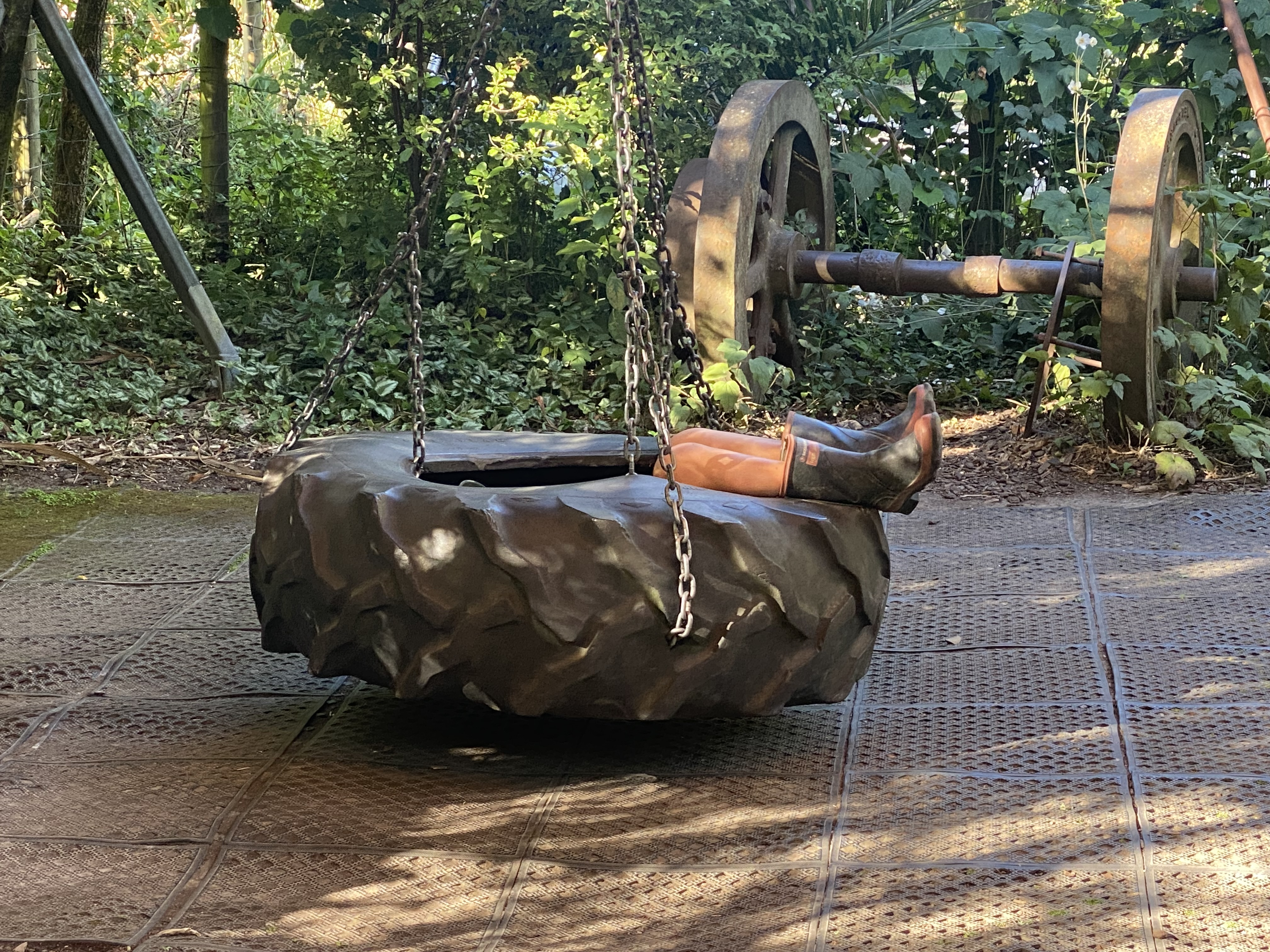
The tyre swing

The Mussel Inn was built in 1992 from locally sourced materials including recycled materials with macrocarpa planks on the inside. It is clad in corrugated iron. The architecture references 19th-century colonial buildings and 1950s tramping huts. Many of the furnishings were built by Andrew Dixon. He built the tables strong enough for up to eight people to dance on them, saying: "People just love dancing on tables; there's something special about it, so I built them to handle it".

The main building is a single room structure with an open fireplace, verandas on two sides and a large courtyard. One of the features in the courtyard is a tyre swing which has been there so long that some of their customers remember it from when they were two years old. There is a house at the back where the owners live, although they sometimes move into a smaller hut and give their house to accommodate musicians who perform at the Inn. There are carvings of large heads by artist Neil Baker in the courtyard and also other art and decorations.

Mussel Inn

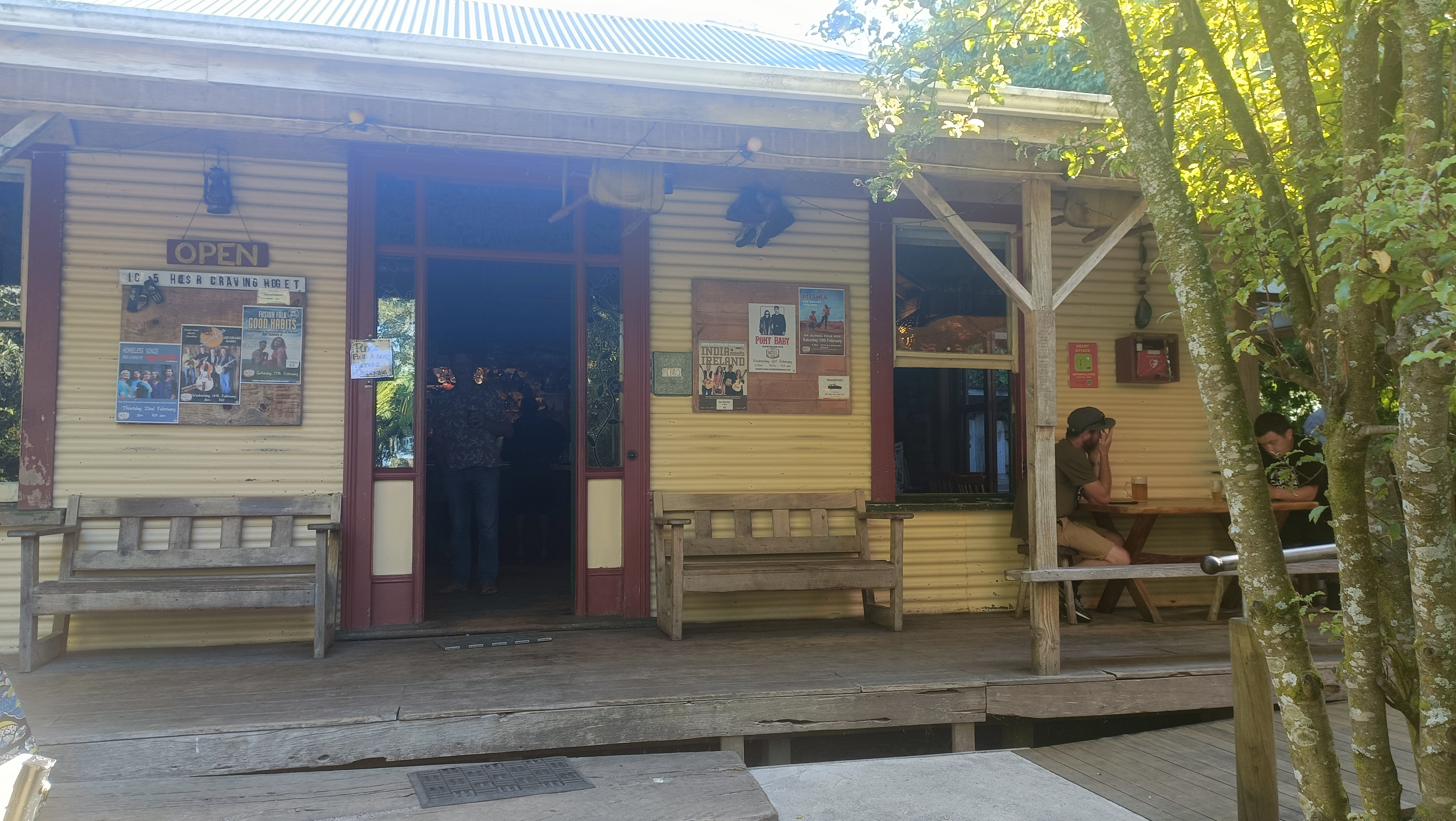
Front entrance to bar

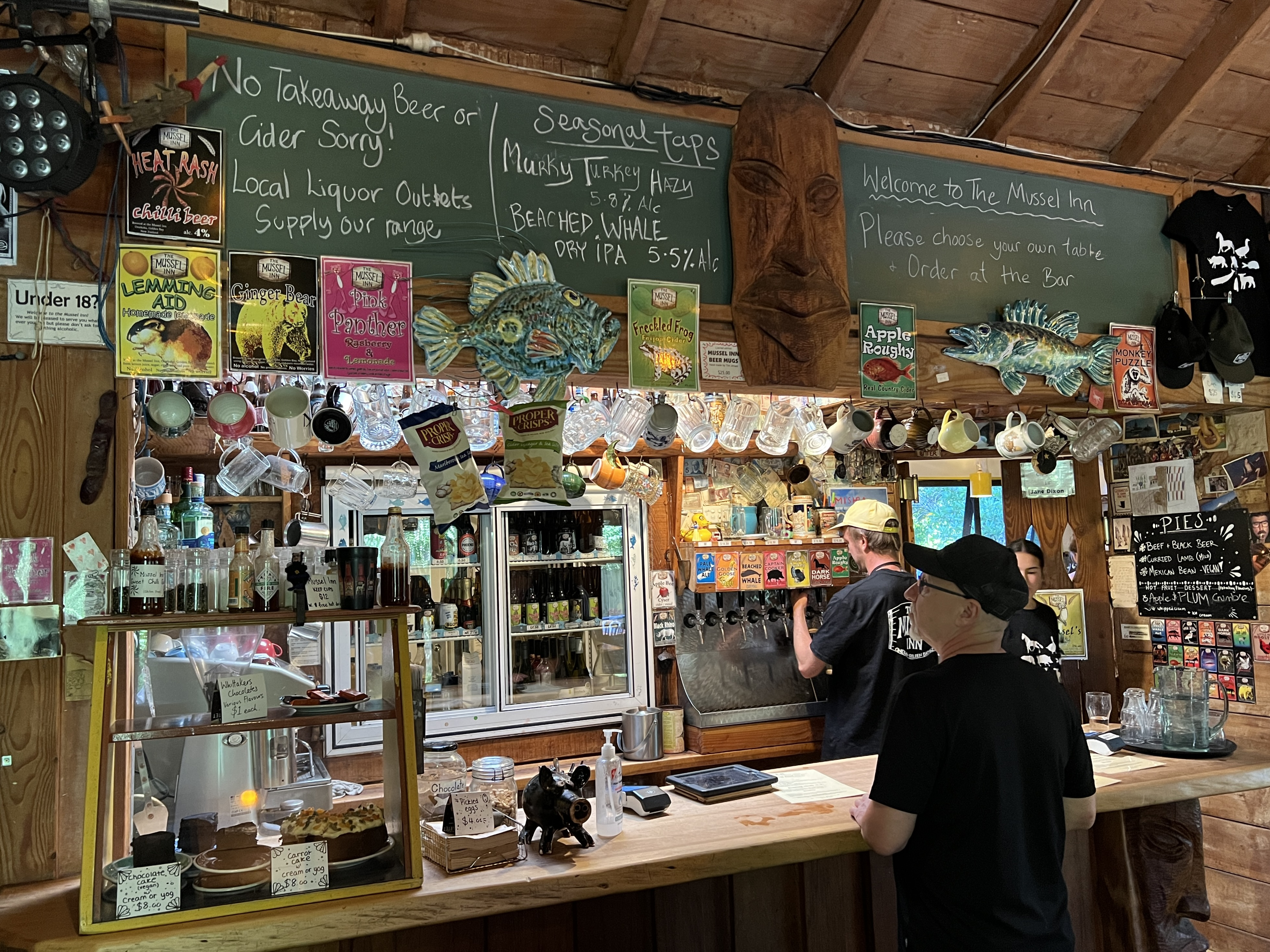
the bar

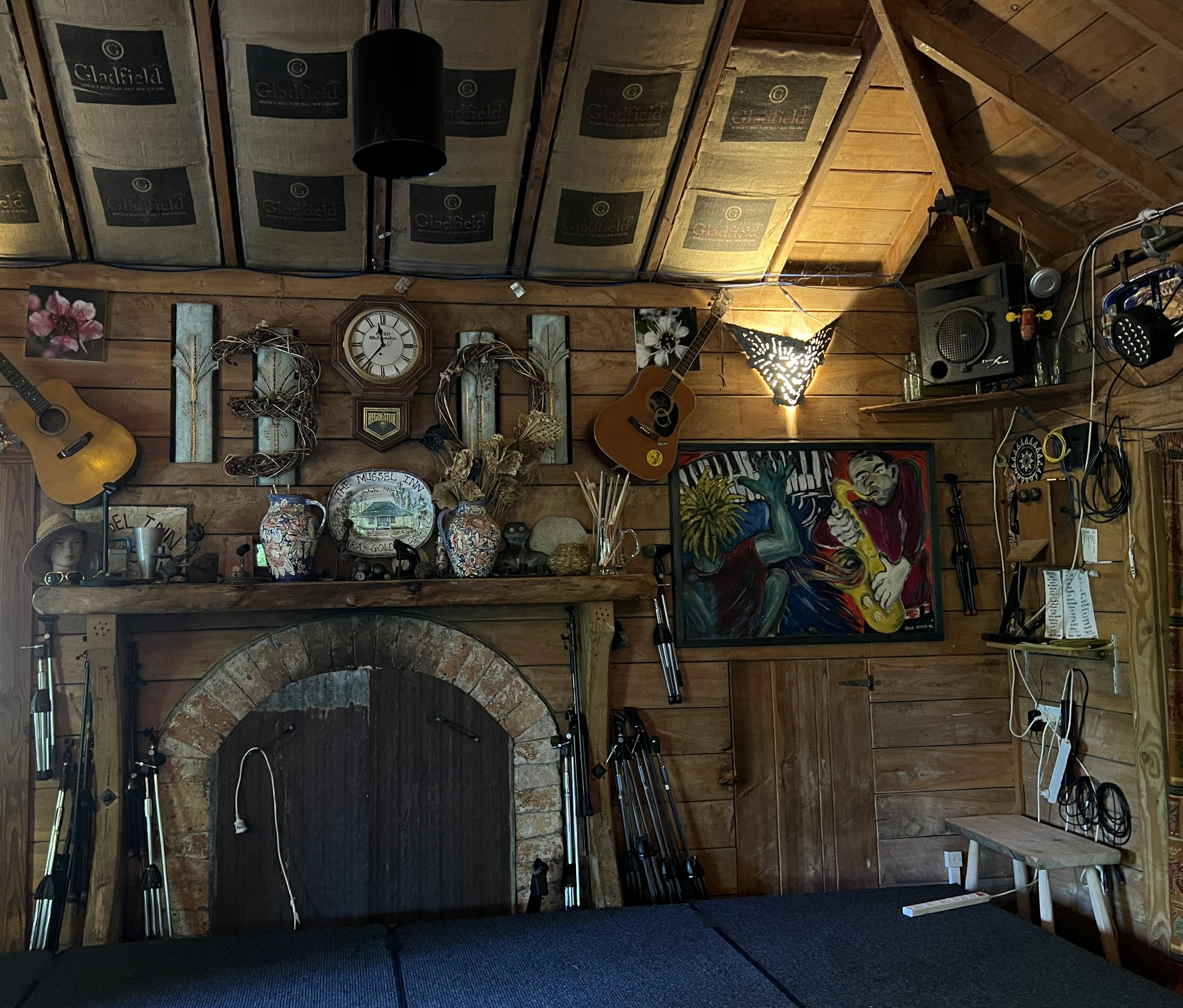
Interior

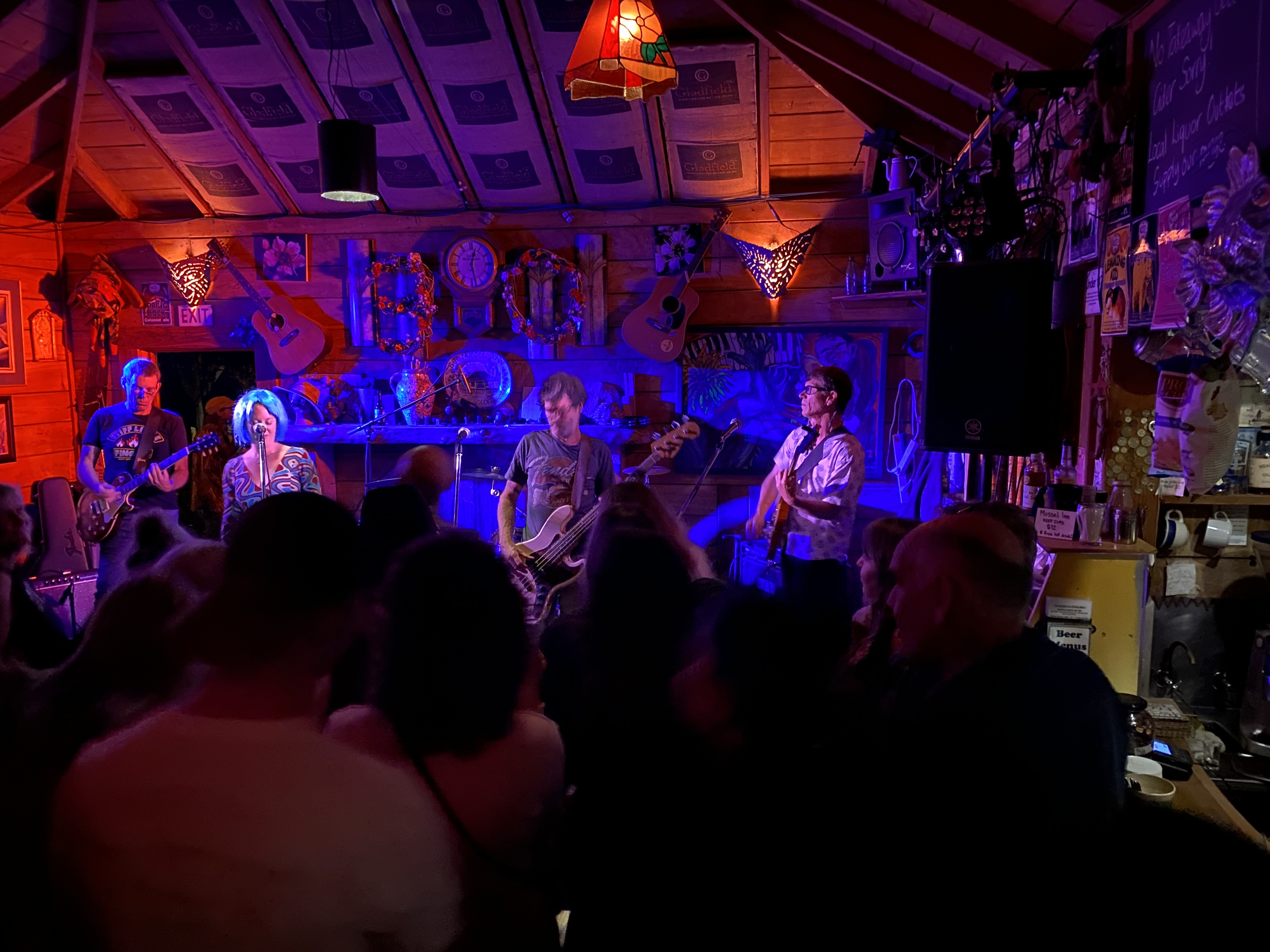
Band performing on stage

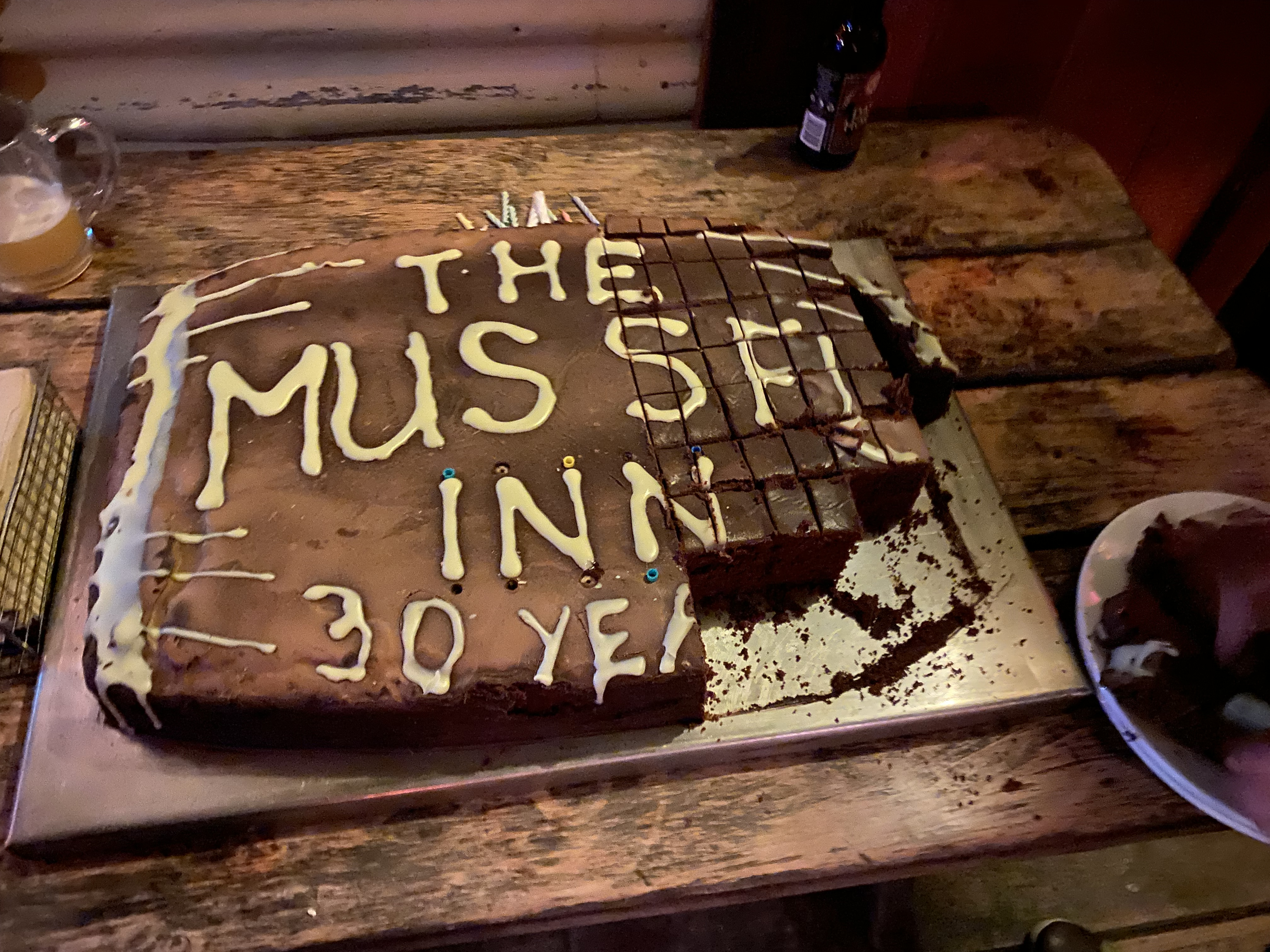
30th birthday cake

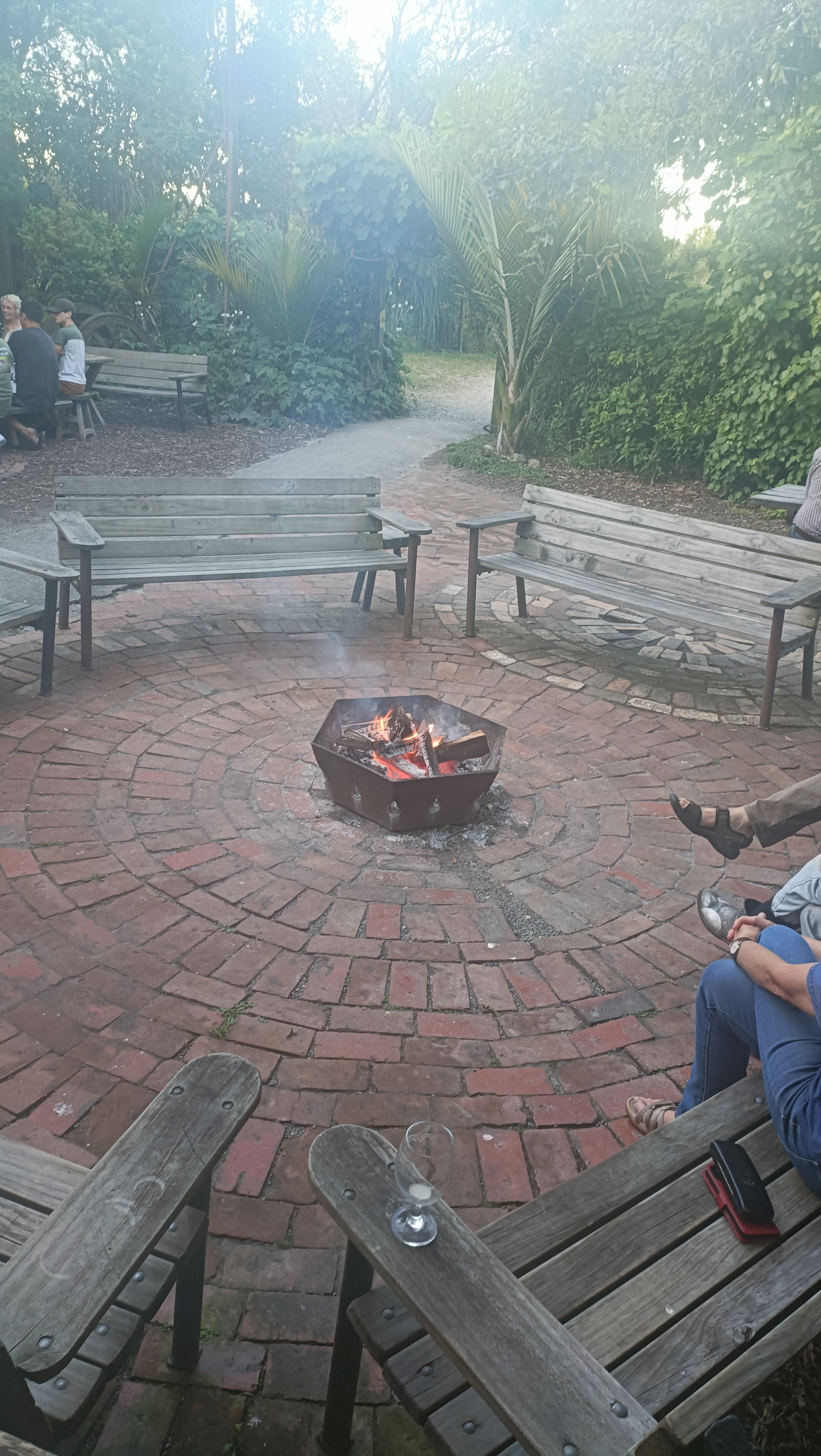
Courtyard

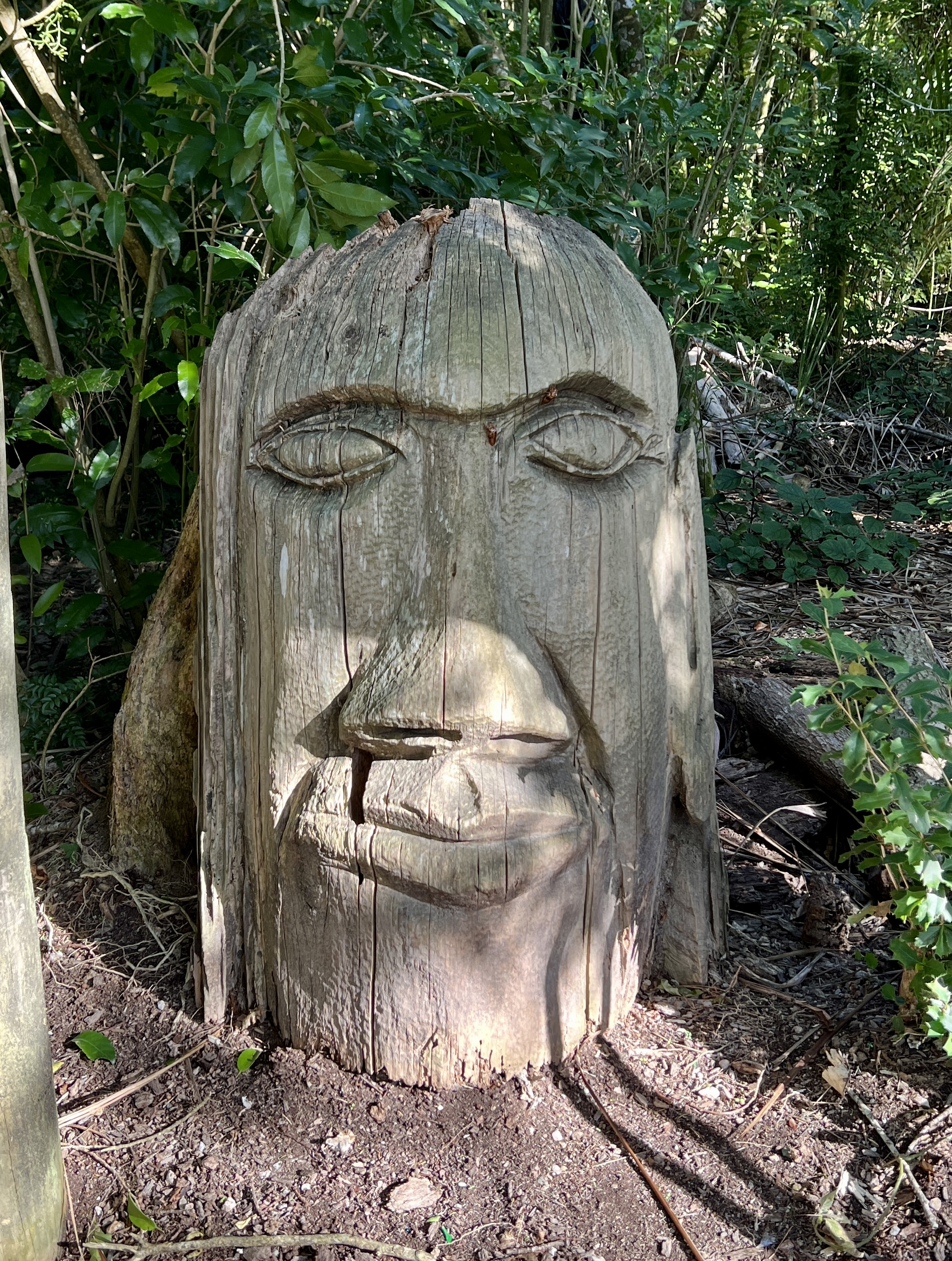
Sculpture by Neil Baker

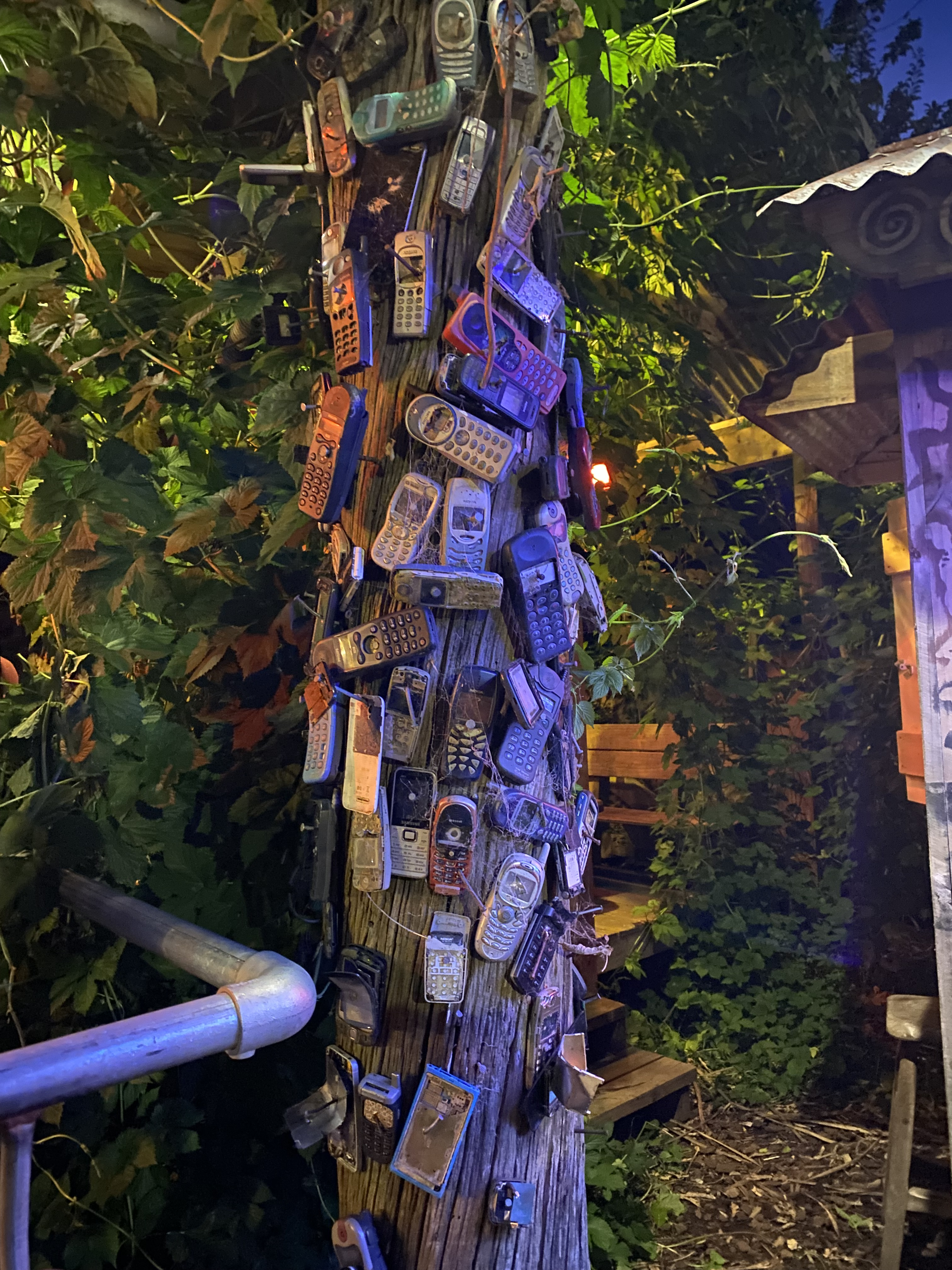
The 'phone tree' of the Mussel Inn

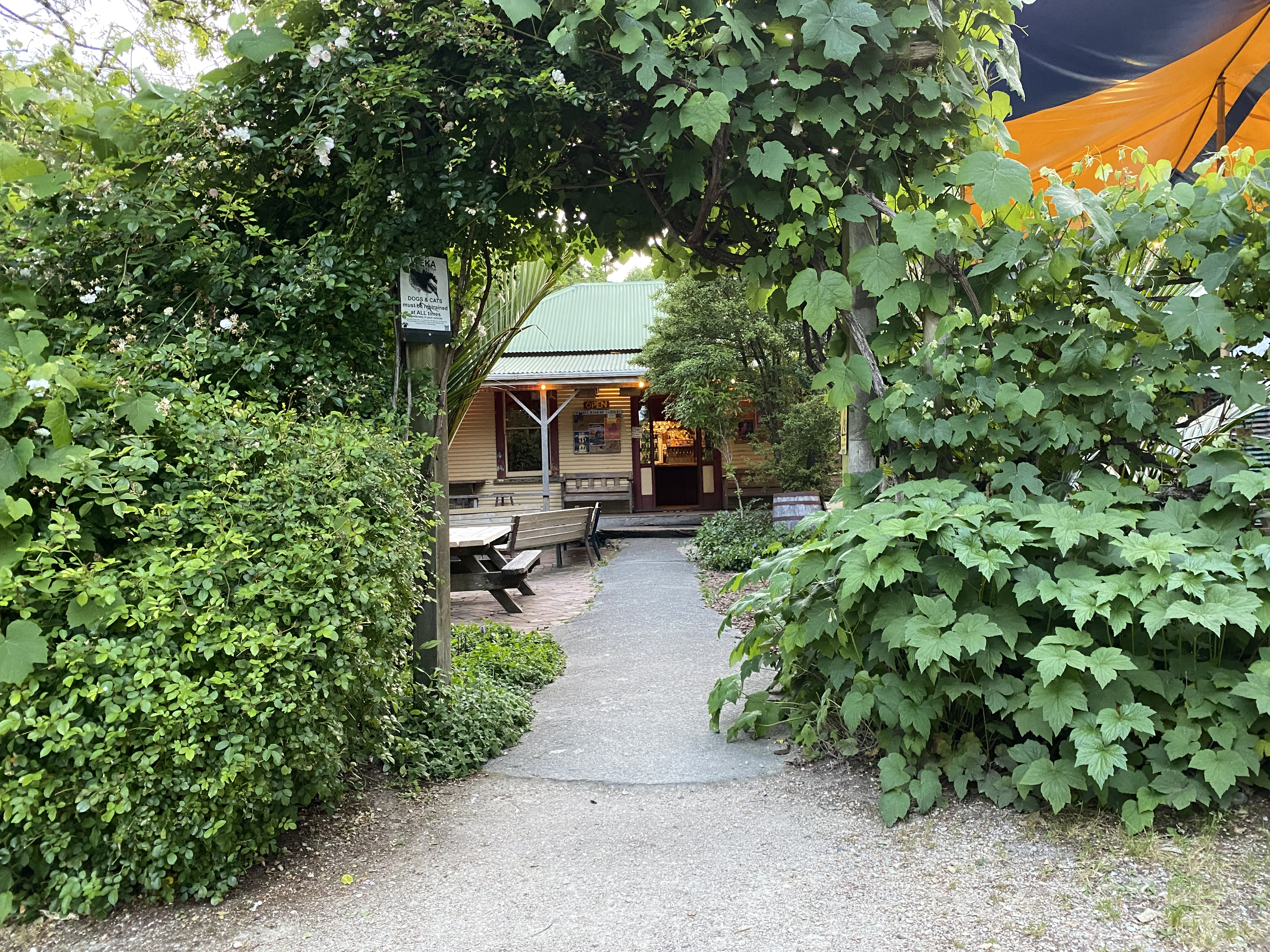
Archway entrance

== Awards ==
- Winner, Sustainable Business (2006) – Ministry for the Environment
- Runner Up, Best Bar (2013) – Society of Beer Advocates (Soba)
