= Onekaka Ironworks =

Former ironworks in New Zealand

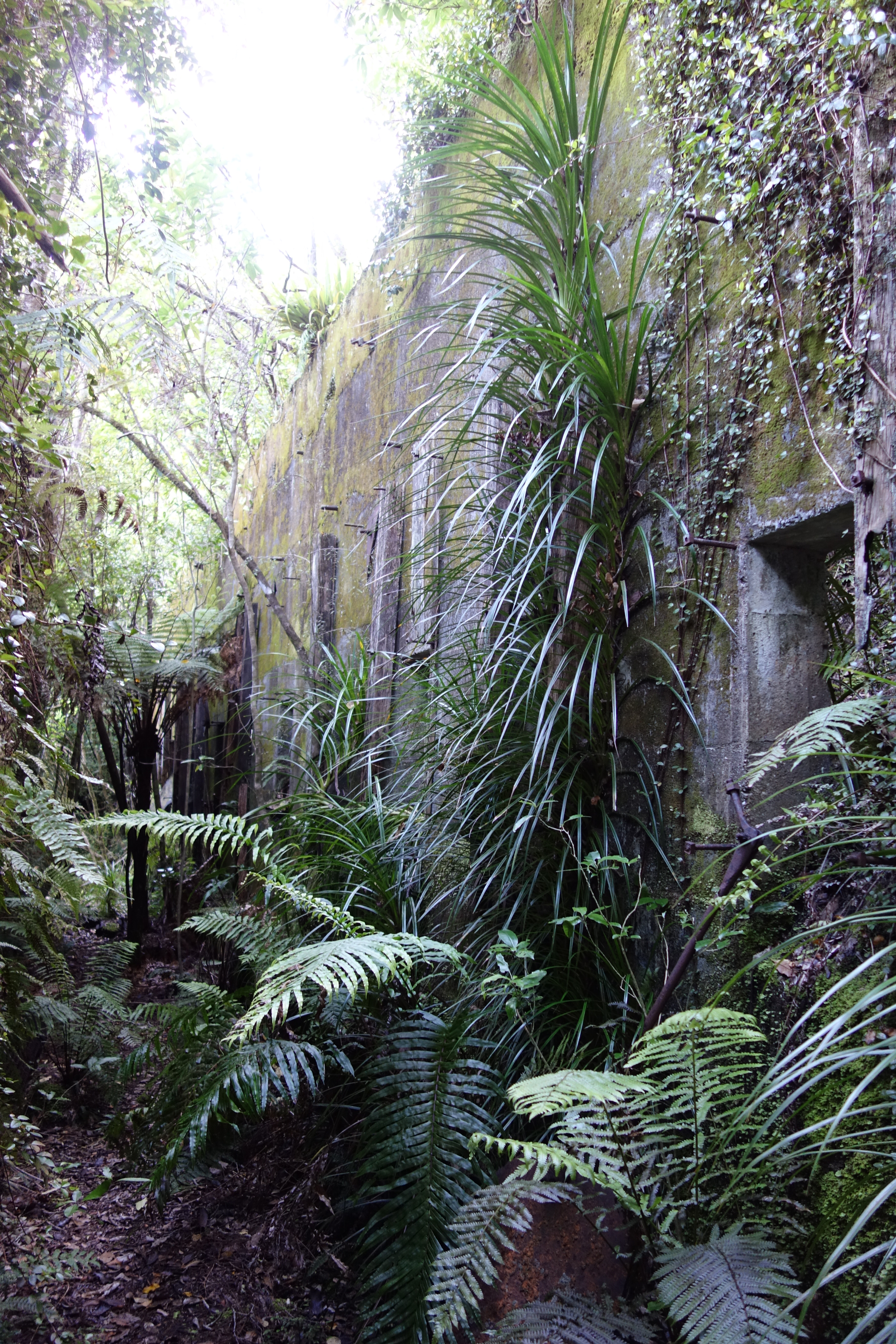

- Location in New Zealand
- Location: Onekaka, Tasman District, New Zealand; 40°46′7″S 172°42′6″E
- Products: Iron
- Opened: 1924
- Closed: 1935

Heritage New Zealand – Category 2
- Designated: 1 January 2022
- Reference no.: 5120

Onekaka Iron and Steel was first floated in 1921 with the works becoming operational in 1924 and only ceasing operation in 1935. The ironworks used the limonite ore from nearby to make iron. To smelt the iron, coal and limestone were also necessary and both limestone and the limonite were mined from the hills behind the works and ferried to the works 2.4 km away, in buckets via an aerial ropeway. Coal had originally been planned to come from the Mataura field, but was eventually sourced from Westport.

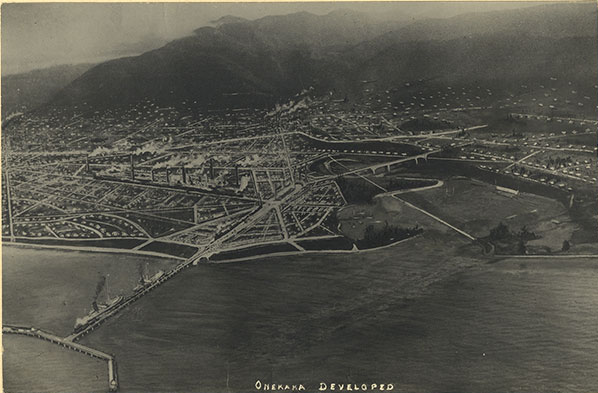
Proposed development for Onekaka (published in 1937 by NZ Truth)

When the industrial use of the iron ore in nearby Parapara was first considered in the early 1900s, it was envisaged to build a wharf north of Tukurua Point. The Parapara iron ore had since the 1870s been used for making red paint, with a tram eventually connecting to a wharf.

Skilton's wharf on the Onekaka Inlet was used to deliver building materials and equipment to build the ironworks in Onekaka, and take away the finished product. However, in 1923 the company was granted permission to build a pier 365 metres long from Onekaka Beach to deep water. A tramline was built in 1924, running 2.6 kilometres from the wharf to the ironworks. This crossed the inlet on raised trestles, and passed under the highway. In 1928–29, a hydro-electric scheme was built to power the pipe-making plant.

The blast furnace was able to produce 10,000 tons of iron per year, outrunning local demand, and produced over 81,000 tons of iron between 1922 and 1935. However, the plant could not compete with overseas iron and by 1930 the market for iron pipes had also collapsed. By 1931, the company was in receivership, closing in 1935.

in 1938, the government acquired the ironworks and there were proposals to revive them, but efforts to revive the works ceased in 1954.

== Heritage ==
Onekaka Ironworks Wharf and Tramline Piles have been declared part of New Zealand's cultural heritage, which has "significance as a poignant physical link to an ambitious iron mining and smelting scheme".

== Gallery ==
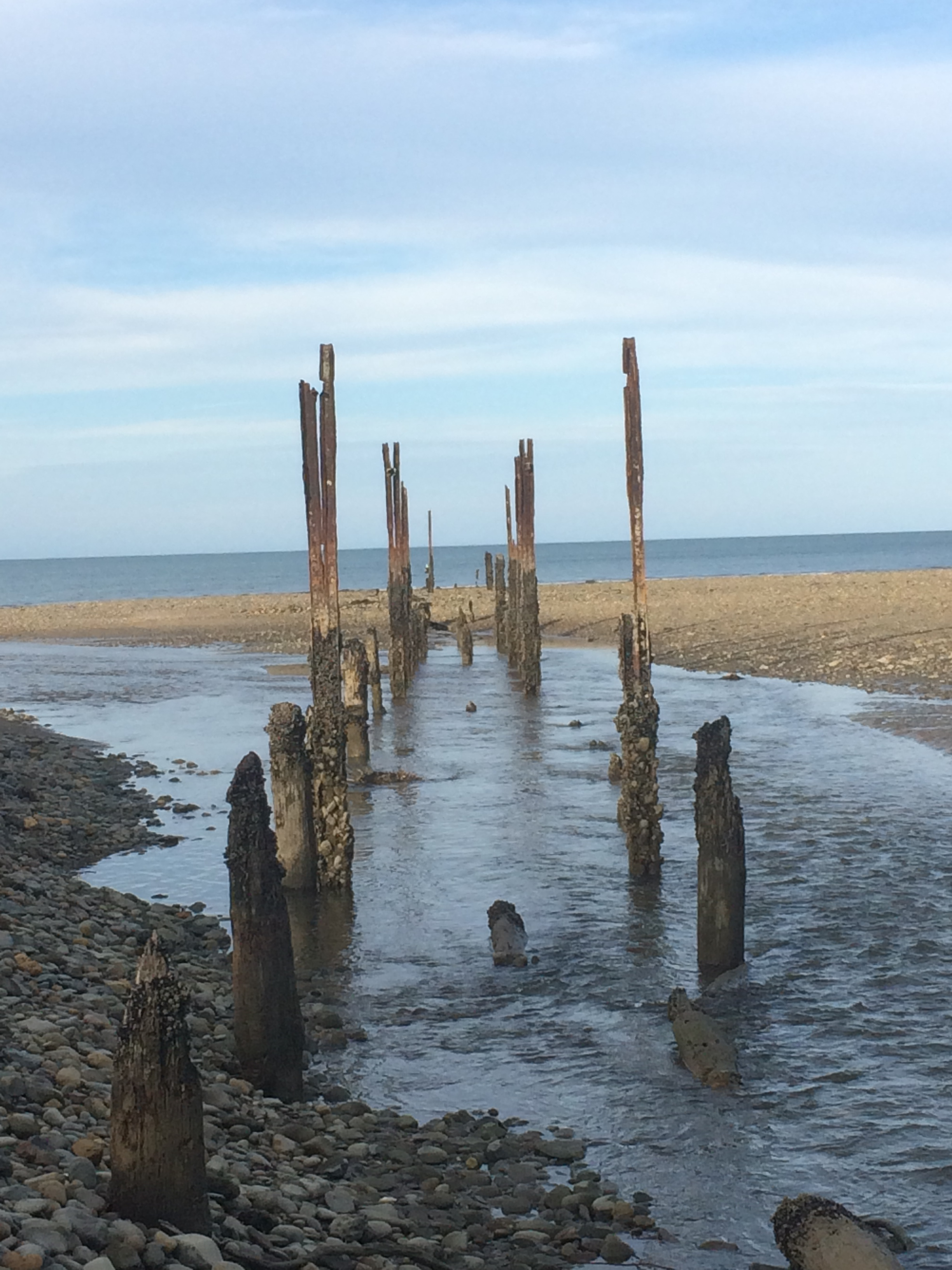
Remnants of the Onekaka wharf

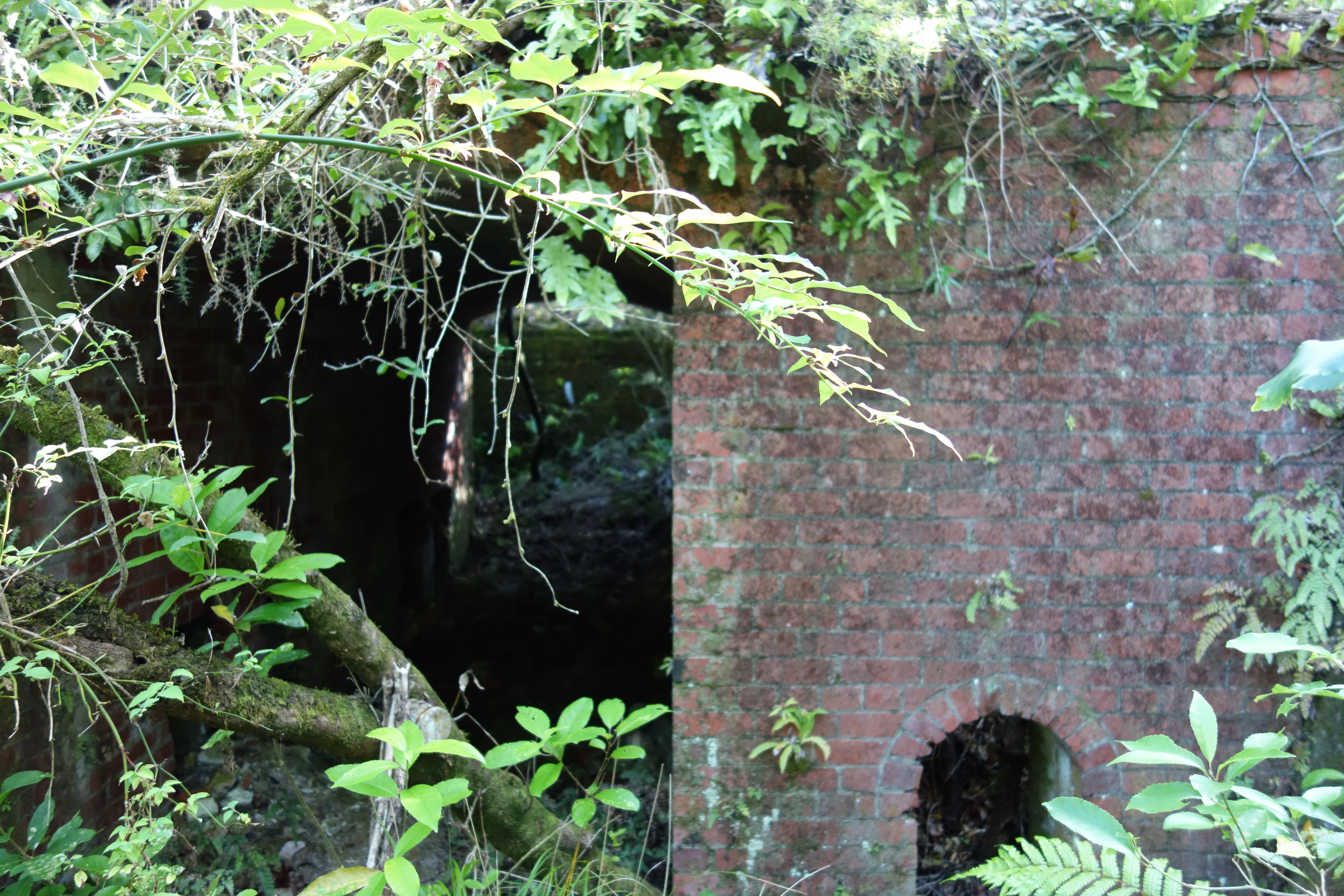

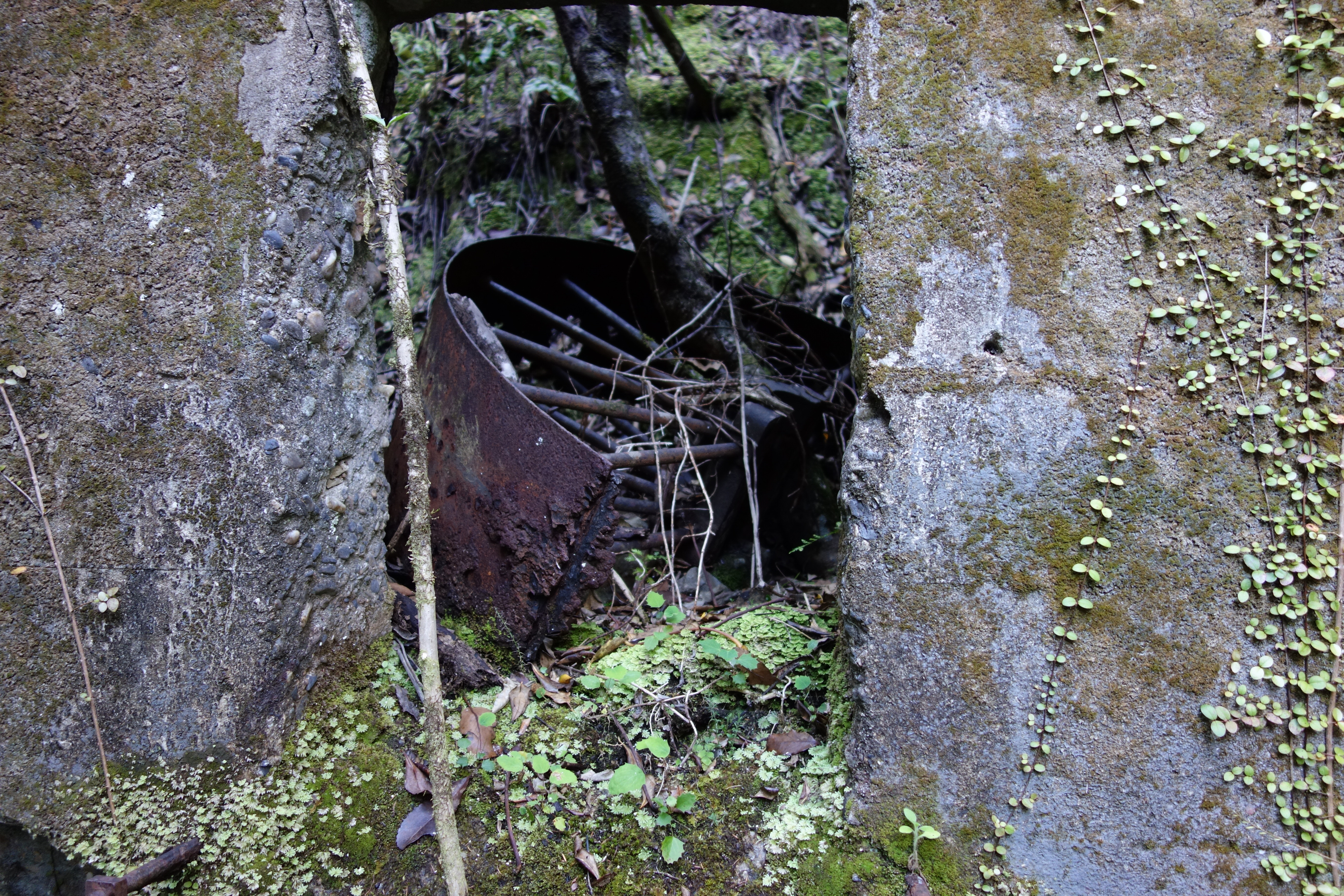

== See also ==
- Mining in New Zealand
