= Electric Kiwi =

New Zealand electricity retailer

- Industry: Electricity
- Founded: 2014; 12 years ago
- Headquarters: Auckland, New Zealand
- Area served: New Zealand
- Key people: Luke Blincoe (CEO)
- Website: electrickiwi.co.nz

Electric Kiwi is an independent online New Zealand electricity retailer. Established in 2014, Electric Kiwi has a focus on using cloud computing and smart meters to service customers in major urban areas around the country. Its services depend on the presence of smart meters in the customer's home. Over one million households in New Zealand were equipped with smart meters as of January 2014.

Electric Kiwi is owned by Energy Collective Limited. 66.8% of the stock is owned by Scientific Investors LPP, a holdings firm based in the United Kingdom, and the other 33.2% is owned by private investors. Electric Kiwi offers a free off-peak hour of power to its customers between 9 am–5 pm and 9 pm–7 am daily. As of 2020, Electric Kiwi had 70,900 customers, giving it a 3.2% share of the retail market and making it the 10th-largest retailer in New Zealand. Nearly all (69,800, or 98.4%) of its customers are classified as residential. In addition to power, Electric Kiwi also offers broadband and mobile phone services.

== History ==
Electric Kiwi was established in mid-2014 and took on its first test customers in December of that year before launching to the public in May 2015. The company's founders, Julian Kardos, Phillip Andreson and Huia Burt, saw an opportunity in the electricity retailing market for a provider which leveraged the capabilities of smart meters, which it and consumer advocacy group Consumer NZ believed were being under-utilised at that time. Electric Kiwi used information gathered from smart meters to more accurately determine its electricity purchases from wholesalers, with the intent of passing savings on to its customers. In April 2017, Electric Kiwi accused competitor Trustpower of intentionally slowing the uptake of smart meters among its customers to prevent them from switching to retailers reliant on smart meter technology, though the Electricity Authority stated it was satisfied with retailers' roll-out rates.

In July 2018, it was reported that Electric Kiwi's "free hour of power" promotion was causing local lines in northern Dunedin to overload, resulting in regular outages. As the area is home to many students from the University of Otago and Otago Polytechnic, numerous customers had selected the same free hour, causing a spike in demand. Electric Kiwi attributed the issue to inadequate local lines infrastructure and low-quality housing, while local lines company Aurora Energy argued it would be uneconomical to increase capacity for such short-term spikes, suggesting retailers should ensure their promotions do not adversely affect the network. In September 2019 the Energy Efficiency Conservation Authority launched the 'Gen Less' campaign to encourage reduced energy use among this demographic.

During an October 2018 spike in the wholesale electricity market, Electric Kiwi temporarily halted customer switches from spot-price providers. CEO Luke Blincoe compared spot-based power retailing to remaining uninsured, stating the risks could result in higher customer costs at times of market volatility. Also in October 2018, Electric Kiwi joined Flick Electric, Pulse, and Vocus Communications in a complaint to the Electricity Authority, alleging an 'Undesirable Trading Situation' caused by a price spike. In February 2019, the Authority found that the spike was due to outages and a lack of information on gas supply, concluding there was no evidence of anticompetitive behavior.

In June 2019, Electric Kiwi lodged complaints with the Commerce Commission and the Advertising Standards Authority alleging that Meridian Energy was "greenwashing" in their advertising claims of 100% renewable electricity, arguing that most energy generated in New Zealand enters a shared grid. Both complaints were subsequently dropped by the authorities. Also in 2019, Electric Kiwi funded two studies by Auckland University of Technology on contemporary kiwi'identity. After heavy rainfall and flooding in Southland in November 2019, Electric Kiwi and other small retailers complained to the Electricity Authority regarding the spilling of water from hydropower stations by competitors Meridian Energy and Contact Energy. Both companies stated they had acted appropriately. In April 2020, Electric Kiwi complained to the Electricity Authority that Genesis Energy had breached the government's Electricity Pricing Review Panel’s ban on 'win backs'—where retailers offer leaving customers improved deals to retain them. Genesis attributed the breaches to a clerical error. During the COVID-19 pandemic in May 2020, Electric Kiwi sponsored the "Jam on Toast" live music festival, which was streamed online via Facebook.

In July 2024, Electric Kiwi stopped accepting new electricity customers due to elevated wholesale energy prices, stating that prices had risen by nearly 73% in the preceding six months. The company argued that at prevailing market rates, every new unhedged customer would be loss-making. Only existing customers were able to access Electric Kiwi's broadband services during this period. The company, which had previously lodged a complaint with the Commerce Commission in 2023 concerning alleged misuse of market power in the industry, accused regulatory authorities of inadequate action in response to sustained high prices and record profits among the four large generator–retailers (Mercury, Contact, Meridian, and Genesis). At the time, wholesale futures prices had nearly doubled since the original complaint, reaching record levels.

In August 2024, Electric Kiwi expanded its services to include mobile phone offerings as a mobile virtual network operator (MVNO), using the 2degrees network. The new plans offered flexibility by allowing customers to increase data allowances during billing cycles. On 4 October 2024, Electric Kiwi announced that it was once again accepting new electricity customers, following improved wholesale conditions. The company stated it was pleased to welcome new households and reiterated its calls for market reform. Simultaneously, new customers gained the option to bundle or individually select Electric Kiwi's broadband and mobile services, enabling consumers to obtain electricity, internet, and phone plans from a single provider if desired.

== Awards ==
Canstar Blue awarded Electric Kiwi the 2017 Most Satisfied Customers Award – Electricity Providers. In 2018, Electric Kiwi was awarded the People's Choice Award from Consumer NZ, was named the New Zealand energy retailer of the year, and was the winner of Deloitte Fast 50.

== Areas of operation ==
Electric Kiwi services customers in the following local lines company areas.

North Island

- Top Energy (Far North district)
- Northpower (Whangarei and Kaipara districts)
- Vector (Auckland region north of Papakura)
- Counties Power (Pukekohe)
- WEL Networks (Hamilton and northern Waikato)
- Waipā Networks (Waipa)
- The Lines Company (King Country)
- Powerco (western Bay of Plenty, eastern Waikato, Taranaki, and most of Manawatu-Wanganui and Wairarapa)
- Unison Networks (Rotorua, Taupō, and Napier and Hastings)
- Eastland Network (Gisborne and East Coast)
- Horizon Energy Distribution (Eastern Bay of Plenty)
- Centralines (Central Hawke's Bay)
- Scanpower (Tararua)
- Electra (Horowhenua and Kapiti Coast districts)
- Wellington Electricity (Wellington metro)

South Island

- Nelson Electricity (Central Nelson city area)
- Network Tasman (Wider Nelson and Tasman areas)
- Marlborough Lines (Marlborough)
- MainPower (North Canterbury and Kaikoura regions)
- Orion (Christchurch and Selwyn)
- EA Networks (Ashburton/Mid-Canterbury)
- Alpine Energy (Timaru/South Canterbury)
- Network Waitaki (North Otago/Oamaru)
- Aurora Energy (Dunedin city and most of Central Otago)

== See also ==
- Electricity sector in New Zealand
- Energy in New Zealand
- List of power stations in New Zealand
- National Grid (New Zealand)
- New Zealand electricity market
- Renewable electricity in New Zealand
