= New Zealand electricity market =

The New Zealand electricity market is a decentralised electricity market regulated by the Electricity Industry Participation Code administered by the Electricity Authority (EA). The authority was established in November 2010 to replace the Electricity Commission.

== Overview ==
Until 1987, New Zealand had a centrally run system of providers of generation, transmission, distribution, and retailing. Reform has since led to the separation of the monopoly elements from the contestable elements to create competitive markets in energy retailing and generation. Regulation has also been imposed on the natural monopolies of transmission and distribution.

Since about 2000, the market is split as follows: regulation, administration, generation, market clearing, transmission, distribution, metering and retail.

The wholesale market for electricity operates under the Electricity Industry Participation Code (EIPC), and is overseen by the market regulator, the Electricity Authority. Trade takes place at more than 200 pricing nodes across New Zealand. Generators can make offers to supply electricity at grid injection points, while retailers and some major industrial users make bids to withdraw "offtake" electricity at grid exit points. The market uses a locational marginal pricing auction which takes generators' offers and retailers' bids, and computes final prices and quantities at each node. These auctions are held every half-hour for a total of 48 trading periods each day.

In addition to the core wholesale spot market there are two associated markets. A hedge market for CFD financial contracts is operated by the ASX Australian Stock Exchange, and an FTR market for Financial Transmission Rights is operated by Energy Market Services, a business unit of Transpower. These markets are linked to wholesale market prices at select locations, allowing market participants to manage their basis risk.

The Electricity Authority contracts out the services required to run the electricity market. The Reconciliation Manager who reconciles all metered quantities, the Pricing Manager who determines the final prices at each node and Clearing and Settlement Manager who pays generators for their generation at the market clearing price and invoices all retailers for their offtake, are all contracted to New Zealand Exchange (NZX), who acquired the previous service provider M-co in June 2009.

The owner of the national transmission grid is Transpower, a state-owned enterprise. Transpower is also the System Operator, responsible for ensuring real time electricity supply security and quality. Transpower is the market scheduler, predicting demand to help generators make offers, as well as the dispatcher, in charge of matching demand and supply in real time.

Distribution of electricity from the grid exit points to the end consumers' premises is the responsibility of about 30 distributors, also known as lines companies, who have monopoly control of the lines services on their networks. Ownership of distributors is through trust-owned companies, such as Auckland Energy Consumer Trust, and public companies. Some major industrial users are directly connected to the grid, such as New Zealand Steel and the Tiwai Point Aluminium Smelter.

Numbers of electricity consumers changing electricity supplier per month

There are four major generators: Contact Energy, Genesis Energy, Mercury Energy, Meridian Energy. These four together produce about 90% of New Zealand's electricity. Meridian Energy, Genesis Energy and Mercury Energy are 51% majority owned by the New Zealand government, while Contact is a 100% publicly traded company. An important feature of the New Zealand market is that all the major generators also own retailing arms. The companies are thus commonly known as "gentailers" (generator–retailers.) Proceeding 2021 TrustPower was also a gentailer until selling their retail arm to Mercury under the TrustPower brand and re-branding the remaining generation business as Manawa Energy. Manawa was NZ's largest independent electricity generator, representing around 5% of the New Zealand generation capacity but is slated to be acquired by Contact Energy in July 2025.

Retailers purchase electricity from the wholesale market, and on-sell it to consumers. Competition for retail customers varies across the country but since 1999, when full retail competition was introduced, customers have switched at a rate between 9% and 14% per annum. Consumer NZ, with support from the Ministry of Consumer Affairs, provides a website called Powerswitch that enables consumers to compare electricity and gas prices from different retailers and to switch suppliers.

MBIE published a useful chronology of reforms up to 2015.

== Wholesale spot market ==
New Zealand demand-weighted daily average wholesale price of electricity 2009 to 2012. Source: Electricity Authority

Electricity is traded at a wholesale level in a spot market. The market operation is managed by several service providers under agreements with the Electricity Authority. The physical operation of the market is managed by Transpower in its role as system operator.

Generators submit offers through a Wholesale Information and Trading System (WITS). Each offer covers a future half-hour period (called a trading period) and is an offer to generate a specified quantity at that time in return for a nominated price. The System Operator (Transpower) uses a scheduling, pricing and dispatch (SPD) system to rank offers, submitted through WITS, in order of price, and selects the lowest-cost combination of offers from the generators to satisfy demand.

The market pricing principle is known as bid-based security-constrained economic dispatch with nodal prices.

The highest-priced offer from a generator required to meet demand for a given half-hour sets the spot price for that trading period.

Electricity spot prices can vary significantly across trading periods, reflecting factors such as changing demand (e.g. lower prices in summer when demand is subdued) and supply (e.g. higher prices when hydro lakes and inflows are below average). Spot prices can also vary significantly across locations, reflecting electrical losses and constraints on the transmission system (e.g. higher prices in locations further from generating stations).

Negative prices are not permitted in the New Zealand electricity market. However, generators may bid in a Must Run Dispatch Auction (MRDA) for the right to submit offers at $0/MWh. For all other generators, the minimum offer price is $0.01/MWh.

Trades take place at approximately 285 nodes (grid injection points and grid exit points) across New Zealand every half-hour. Generators make offers to supply electricity at 59 grid injection points (GIPs) at power stations, while retailers and major users make bids to buy electricity at 226 grid exit points (GXPs) on the national grid.

Final prices at each node, taking account of grid losses and constraints, are processed and confirmed the following day.

All electricity generated is required to be traded through the central pool, with the exception of small generating stations of less than 10MW. Bilateral and other hedge arrangements are possible, but function as separate financial contracts. Trading develops by bids (purchaser/demand) and offers (generator/supply) for 48 half-hour periods for each pricing nodes on the national grid.

Bids and offers start 36 hours before the actual real-time consumption or trading period. Up to four hours (pre-dispatch) before the trading period starts a new forecast price is calculated to guide participants in the market. From four hours to the start of the trading period every half-hour a dispatch price is calculated and communicated. One hour before the start of the trading period bids and offers can no longer be revised (with some exceptions) and the new prices reflect Transpower's adjustments in load forecasts and system availability.

During each half-hour period Transpower publishes a new real-time price every five minutes, and a time-weighted 30-minute average price. The real-time prices are used by some large direct-connect consumers to adapt their demand. The prices are however guidelines only as the final prices are calculated ex-post—normally around 10:00am the following day, unless there are irregularities or disputes. Using the offer prices as established two hours before the trading period and volumes as established during the trading period. Differences between forecast, dispatch, real-time and final prices can be significant.

== Market abuse ==
=== Studies ===
In 2009, the Commerce Commission released a report by Stanford economist Frank Wolak on the ability of the four largest electricity suppliers to exercise unilateral market power in the wholesale electricity market and the economic rents (any payment in excess of the cost of production) that may have resulted. Using empirical industrial organization techniques, Wolak estimates these rents to be $4.3 billion over the 7 years he studied when compared with a perfectly competitive market. The methodology he used and the results are also described in a working paper. His report was criticised for aspects of its methodology, with the Electricity Technical Advisory Group (ETAG), Ministry of Economic Development, claiming that there is no evidence of the sustained exercise of market power. The Commerce Commission decided not to act. Rex Ahdar, University of Otago, later opined that competition law in New Zealand is inherently ill-suited to tackling a network industry such as electricity.

An agent-based model (ABM) developed at Auckland University was used to analyse the New Zealand wholesale electricity market. The model suggests considerable market abuse and quantified the combined market rents for 2006 and 2008 to be $2.6 billion, when compared with a perfectly competitive market as counterfactual.

In terms of residential electricity prices, a 2015 report found these were twice as high under retail competition.

=== Incidents ===
There have been long-standing concerns about the potential for market abuse under nodal pricing, particularly when the transmission system becomes congested.

Genesis Energy was "net pivotal" north of Hamilton on 26 March 2011. The HVAC network was under scheduled maintenance with 2 of 6 220 kV lines out and 3 of 5 110 kV lines out, thereby restricting supply from the South Island. Extreme bids by Genesis Energy sent Auckland spot prices to $23047/MWh (€15000/MWh), these prices later returned $197/MWh (€125/MWh) – a factor of 117×. The Electricity Authority declared a UTS (undesirable trading situation) and subsequently dropped the final price to $3000/MWh (€2000/MWh). The Electricity Authority decision was challenged and the High Court of New Zealand found in favour of the regulator. In its submission, the Electricity Authority stated that "the high interim prices on 26 March 2011, if they are allowed to become final prices ... threaten to damage the integrity and reputation of the wholesale market for electricity".

== History of reform ==
Regulation of the electricity market started in a light-handed fashion but there has been an increasing trend towards more heavy-handed regulation. Light-handed regulation is based on the threat of regulation providing an incentive on companies with market power to exercise self-regulation. The normal regulatory legislation such as the Companies Act, Electricity Act, Resource Management Act 1991, Commerce Act 1986, and Fair Trading Act 1986 provide the framework for regulating normal commercial and environmental transactions.

The Fourth National Government increased the extent of intervention through the Electricity Industry Reform Act 1998, which forced power companies to divest either their energy or their lines business. The Electricity Amendment Act 2001 led to another round of industry reform concentrating on achieving better governance of the electricity market and tighter control of monopoly functions. The "threat of regulation" was extended to the production of a set of regulations that would be brought into effect if the industry's self-regulation did not meet the government's criteria.

On 16 May 2003 the result of a referendum by industry participants and customer representatives on a proposed set of self-regulating rules was announced:

- consumers voted 4.4% for the proposal
- traders voted 66.2% for the proposal (traders comprise generating companies and retailers)
- transporters voted 47.4% for the proposal (transporters comprise distributors and Transpower)

As there was not a substantial majority of all classes in favour of the proposal it was not implemented.

The result put paid to the prospect of a multilateral agreement on the governance and operational arrangements for the electricity market. The New Zealand government invoked the regulations already prepared to meet this contingency. The "threat of regulation" had been insufficient to stave off regulation.

On 2 July 2003 a draft set of Electricity Governance Regulations and Rules was issued on behalf of the Minister of Energy by the Electricity Commission Establishment Unit (ECEU). This set was for consultation purposes and after submissions were received and reviewed, a set of regulations and rules was recommended to the Governor-General.

In September 2003 a revised set of draft rules and regulations was issued by the ECEU for submissions by the end of October. The set did not include proposed transmission regulations, which were still being drafted. Also in September the Minister of Energy announced the chair and members of the Electricity Commission. Roy Hemmingway, whose most recent position was chairperson of the Oregon Public Utility Commission in the US, took on the role as chairperson of the commission.

The final set of Electricity Governance Regulations and Rules (excluding rules for transmission) became effective on 1 March 2004. The final chapter of the Electricity Governance Rules, on transmission, was gazetted on 28 April to become effective on 28 May 2004.

A Ministerial Review of Electricity Market Performance was initiated on 1 April 2009 and led by an independent Electricity Technical Advisory Group, appointed by the Minister for Energy and Resources, with assistance from officials from the Ministry of Economic Development. There were 29 recommendations arising from the review.

One of the key recommendations approved by Cabinet was the transfer of ownership and operation of some power stations between Genesis Energy and Meridian Energy in order to increase retailer competition in both islands and to give Genesis a South Island generating base. It was decided that Genesis would receive the Tekapo A and Tekapo B hydroelectric power stations from Meridian, and Meridian would receive the Whirinaki Power Station from the government (although Meridian eventually declined to accept). The transfer of Tekapo A and B was completed on 1 June 2011.

On 1 November 2010, the Electricity Authority commenced operations, taking over from the Electricity Commission.

In April 2013, the Labour Party and the Green Party said if they were to win the 2014 election, they would introduce a single buyer for electricity, in order to cut retail costs. The government responded by calling it "economic vandalism", comparing it to the Soviet Union, but Greens co-leader Russel Norman said it would boost the economy and create jobs. By the following day, shares in privately owned power company Contact Energy had fallen by more than 10 percent. The general election held on 20 September 2014 was won by the National Party. Share prices of listed electricity companies rose significantly when the share market opened on the Monday following the election.

=== Milestones in the reform process ===
- Prior to 1987, the New Zealand Electricity Department (NZED), a government department, controlled and operated almost all electricity generation and operated the electricity transmission grid.
- April 1987 – The New Zealand Government corporatised the NZED and formed a state-owned enterprise – the Electricity Corporation of New Zealand (ECNZ).
- April 1993 – Electricity Market Company (later called M-co) established as a joint venture by New Zealand electricity industry players to act as a focal point for the design of a wholesale electricity market.
  - The Metering and Reconciliation Information Agreement (MARIA) was set up as a multilateral arrangement to allow for retail competition for customers with half-hour interval meters.
  - Former local electricity supply authorities established as energy companies.
- April 1994 – Transpower separated from ECNZ and established as a stand-alone state-owned enterprise.
- July 1994 – The New Zealand Electricity Market (NZEM) commences trading as a secondary market for ECNZ hedges. An independent market surveillance committee was formed.
- June 1995 – After an exhaustive policy debate, the government announced significant reform of the electricity industry including a framework for buying and selling electricity through a wholesale pool.
- February 1996 – An interim wholesale market is put in place allowing ECNZ and Contact to begin competing.
- April 1996 – Contact Energy commenced operations.
- October 1996 – The reformed wholesale electricity market, NZEM, begins trading.
- April 1998 – Government announced the Electricity Industry Reform Act 1998 which included:
  - Privatising Contact Energy.
  - Splitting ECNZ into three competing state-owned enterprises.
  - Instructions to all energy companies to split their retail and lines businesses and sell one or other within a set time period
- April 1999 – Electricity Corporation of New Zealand (ECNZ) disbanded, establishment of three separate competing spin-off generation companies in the form of Mighty River Power, Genesis and Meridian Energy. A low-cost system for customer switching established allowing every consumer to choose their electricity retailer.
- May 1999 – Contact Energy shares listed for trading on the New Zealand and Australian Stock Exchanges from 11 May 1999.
- February 2000 – The Ministerial Inquiry into the electricity industry begins.
- June 2000 – The report of the Ministerial Inquiry is published.
- November 2000 – Electricity Governance Establishment Project set up as a result of the government's review of the report of the Ministerial Inquiry.
- December 2000 – Government Policy Statement published.
- April 2003 – An industry referendum on the outcomes of the Electricity Governance Establishment Project (EGEP).
- May 2003 – The rules developed by EGEP fail to gain sufficient support in the referendum to avoid government regulation.
- July 2003 – A draft set of regulations and rules was issued for consultation.
- September 2003 – As a result of submissions received, revised rules and regulations were issued for further consultation. A revised Government Policy Statement was issued for submissions and the Electricity Commission was appointed.
- 1 March 2004 – The Electricity Commission took over control of the New Zealand electricity market from the self-regulating bodies, the MARIA Governance Board (MGB) and the Rules Committee of the NZEM.
- October 2004 – The Electricity Act was amended to increase the powers of the Electricity Commission.
- April 2009 – Ministerial review of Electricity Market Performance commences.
- 9 December 2009 – Minister announces outcomes of market review, including 29 new measures.
- 1 November 2010 – Electricity Authority takes over from Electricity Commission, and the Electricity Industry Participation Code comes into effect.

== Current structure ==
The New Zealand electricity market is split into the following areas: administration and market clearing, regulation, generation, transmission, distribution and retailing.

The current legislation (Electricity Industry Reform Act 1998) prevents the ownership of cross-sector investment (that is energy and lines functions). This means a generation company cannot own or have an interest in a distribution company and a distribution company cannot retail electricity or deal in electricity hedges. There are two exceptions to the regulations: generation companies can own the lines required to transport electricity from their power stations to the grid or local distribution network; and distribution companies can own a small amount of conventional generation capacity within their network but are not limited in the level of renewable generation capacity. There is no barrier to vertical integration from generation to retail. The overall arrangement of the industry creates some very interesting market behaviour amongst the players.

=== Generation companies ===
The electricity sector in New Zealand is dominated by five generators, which are Contact Energy, Genesis Energy, Mercury Energy, Meridian Energy, and Trustpower. These are all active in generation, the wholesale market and retail sales of electricity. Between these five companies they produce or control more than 95% of NZ's total electricity generation.

Generation companies
Company	Capacity MW	Generation GWh	Revenue	Employees	Customers	Ownership
Contact Energy	2,022	9,514	2,443m	1,160	429,556	Public ownership
Genesis Energy	1,942	6,699	2,098m	931	531,011	Mixed (public/private) ownership
Meridian Energy	2,654	13,332	2,904m	820	279,616	Mixed (public/private) ownership
Mercury Energy	1,556	6,563	1,678m	800	390,999	Mixed (public/private) ownership
Trustpower	593	2,216	993m	628	258,118	Public ownership

These five companies are listed and traded on the NZX stock exchange. The New Zealand government has 51% ownership of Genesis, Mercury, and Meridian. Contact is also traded on the ASX Australian exchange.

There are a number of smaller companies in the electricity generation industry including WEL Networks, NZ Windfarms, NZ Energy, MainPower, Pioneer and Top Energy.

The retail space is dominated by the five generating companies. The generation and retail companies use this vertical integration as a natural hedge to manage risks associated with volatility of the spot market. For example, during a dry year, the high prices in the wholesale market price benefit the generation arm but hurts the retailers who buy at wholesale prices and sell electricity to consumers at fixed prices; when prices are low, the loss of profits in the generation side is offset by the profits in the retail business.

These five companies have now extended their risk management strategy further by aligning their retail and generation businesses to the same geographic locations. For example, the majority of Meridian Energy's generation assets are in the South Island, and that's where their retail strongholds are. Mercury Energy's generation assets are exclusively in the North Island, and its customer base is also primarily in the North Island.

=== Retail companies ===
The retailers are: Contact Energy, Ecotricity, Electra Energy, Electric Kiwi, Energy Direct, Energy Online, Flick Electric, Genesis Energy, Giving Energy, GLOBUG, King Country Energy, megaEnergy, Mercury Energy, Meridian Energy, Nova Energy, Opunake Hydro, Paua to the People, Payless Energy, Powershop, Pulse Energy, Tiny Mighty Power and Trustpower.

Many of the retailers are owned by generating companies. For example, Mercury Energy owns GLOBUG and Tiny Mighty Power. Some retailers are restricted to certain geographical locations, such as King Country Energy which supplies to the King Country region of the Waikato.

Market share of electricity retailers as at 31 December 2025
Company	New Zealand		North Island		South Island	
Company	ICP count	ICP share	ICP count	ICP share	ICP count	ICP share
Mercury Energy	588,671	25.01%	481,148	27.80%	107,523	17.26%
Genesis Energy	529,314	22.49%	435,249	25.15%	94,065	15.10%
Contact Energy	465,148	19.76%	308,037	17.80%	157,111	25.22%
Meridian Energy	459,753	19.54%	273,048	15.78%	286,705	29.97%
Nova Energy	90,707	3.85%	81,294	4.70%	9,413	1.51%
Pulse Energy	79,188	3.36%	46,442	2.68%	32,766	5.26%
Electric Kiwi	62,686	2.66%	43,920	2.54%	18,766	3.01%
2degrees	56,687	2.41%	43,926	2.54%	12,761	2.05%

== See also ==
- Electricity market
- Electricity sector in New Zealand
- Energy Efficiency and Conservation Authority
- Energy in New Zealand
- National Grid (New Zealand)
- Renewable energy in New Zealand
- Geothermal power in New Zealand
- Hydroelectric power in New Zealand
- Wind power in New Zealand
- List of power stations in New Zealand
- Ministry of Business, Innovation and Employment
