= Tekapo B Power Station =

Hydroelectric power station in Canterbury, New Zealand

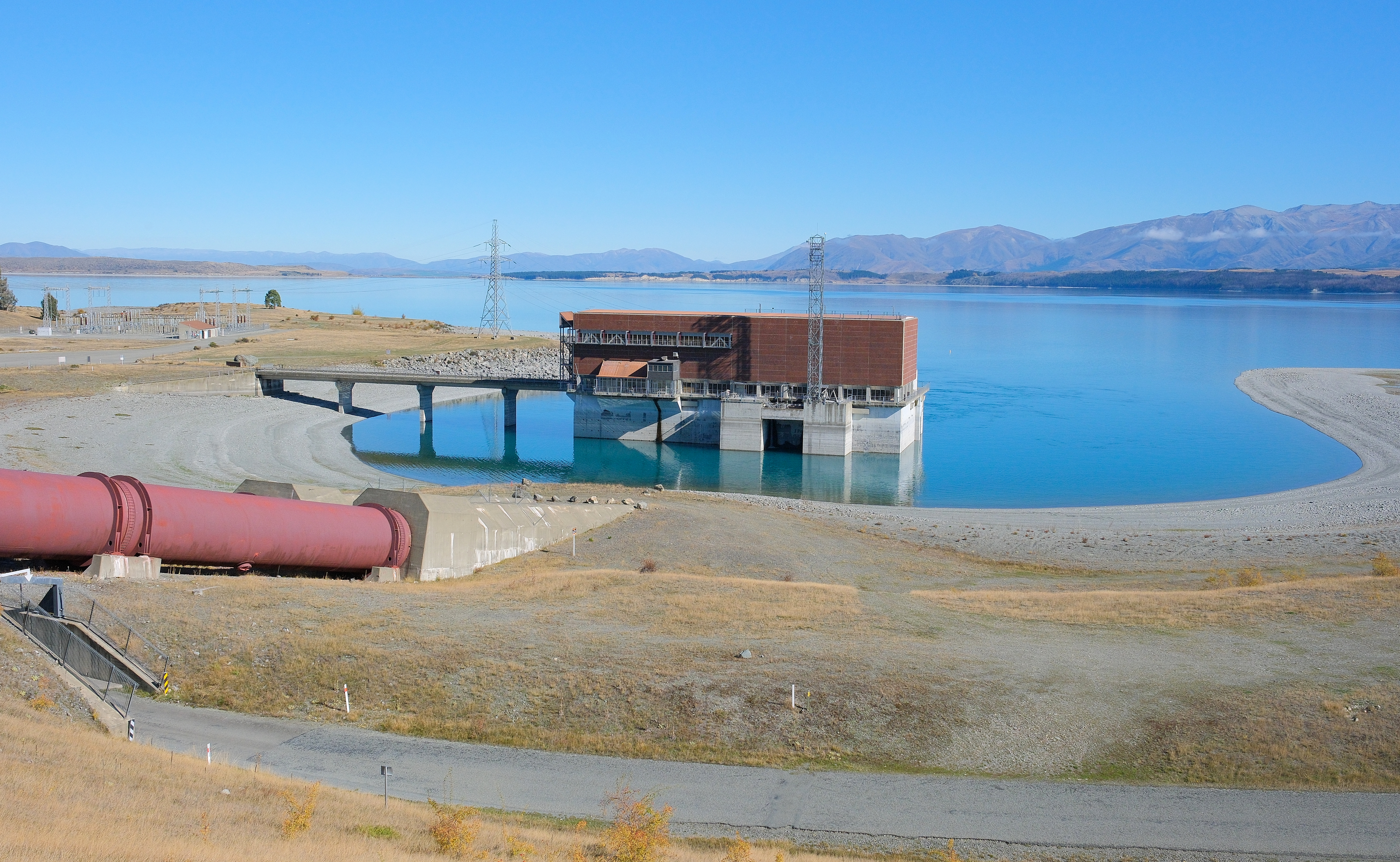
- Tekapo B Power Plant pictured in autumn 2025
- Country: New Zealand
- Location: Canterbury
- Coordinates: 44.1225°S 170.212°E
- Purpose: Power
- Status: Operational
- Construction began: 1970
- Owner(s): Genesis Energy Limited

Power Station
- Commission date: 1977
- Type: Conventional
- Turbines: 2
- Installed capacity: 160 MW (210,000 hp)
- Annual generation: 833 GW·h

The Tekapo B Power Station is a hydroelectric facility on the eastern shore of Lake Pukaki in the Mackenzie Basin, Canterbury, New Zealand. It is driven by water from the Tekapo Canal from the Tekapo A Power Station. The power station is owned and operated by Genesis Energy Limited.

== History ==
The station was built before the lake level of Lake Pukaki was raised as part of the Upper Waitaki hydroelectric scheme. Construction on the Tekapo B Power Station lasted from 1970 to 1977.

The plant was owned by Meridian Energy until 2011, when it was purchased by Genesis Energy Limited under the direction of the New Zealand Government.

== Technical details ==
Water is taken from the Tekapo Canal via penstocks.

The station features two generator units with an output of 80 megawatts (110,000 hp) each. It use Francis turbines. Generated power is fed into the grid via an overhead line managed by Transpower New Zealand.

== See also ==
- Electricity sector in New Zealand
