= Huntly Power Station =

Power station in New Zealand

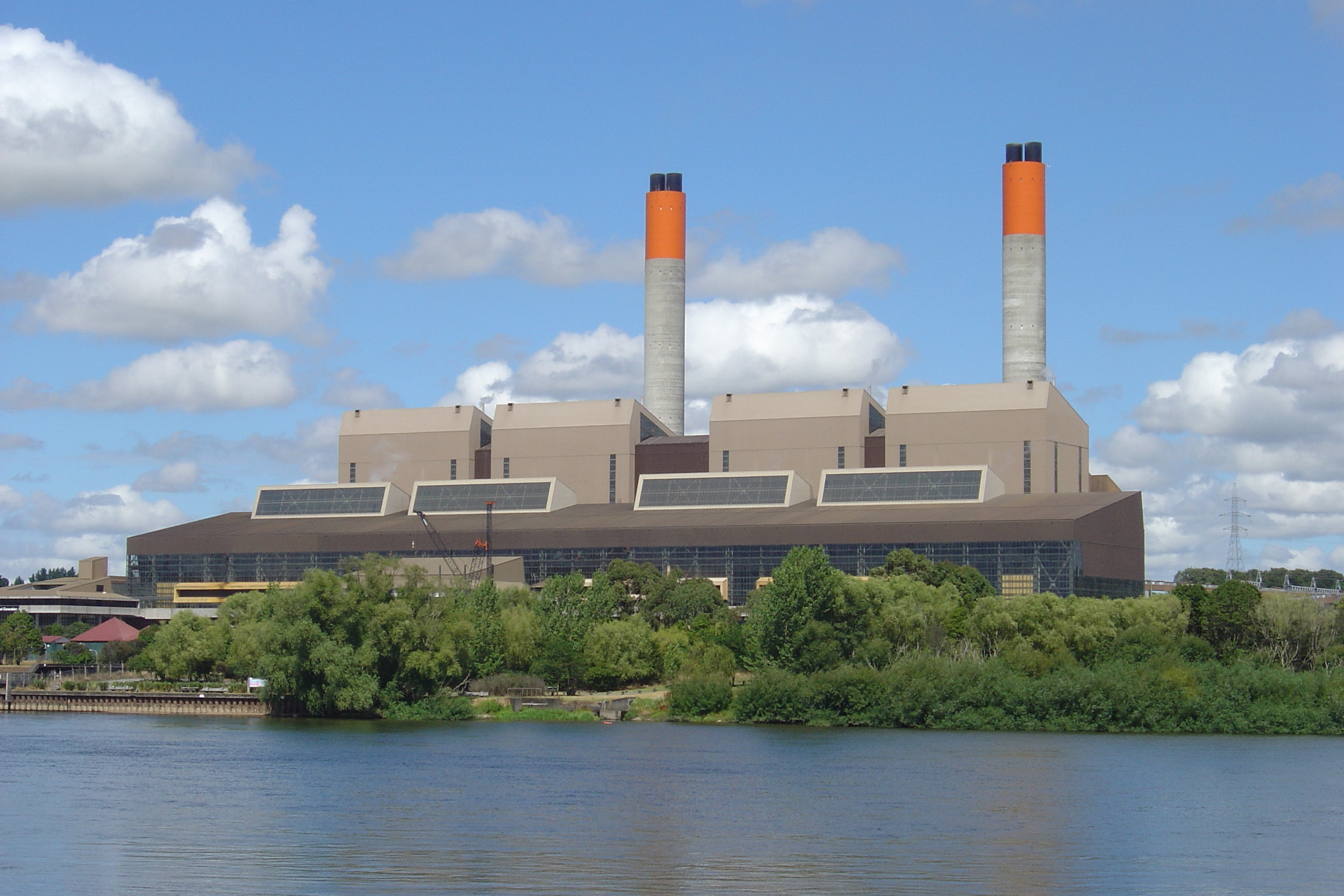
- The station in 2005, with the four steam turbine units
- Country: New Zealand
- Location: Huntly, Waikato
- Coordinates: 37°32′38″S 175°9′10″E
- Status: Operational
- Commission date: 1982
- Owner: Genesis Energy Limited

Thermal power station
- Primary fuel: Natural gas
- Secondary fuel: Coal (units 1–4)
- Combined cycle?: Unit 5 only

Power generation
- Units operational: 3× 250 MW steam turbine 1× 403 MW CCGT; 1× 50 MW open-cycle
- Units decommissioned: 1× 250 MW steam turbine
- Nameplate capacity: 953 MW
- Capacity factor: 66.5%
- Annual net output: 4991 GWh
- Storage capacity: 200 MWh

External links
- Website: www.genesisenergy.co.nz/assets
- Commons: Related media on Commons

The Huntly Power Station is the largest thermal power station in New Zealand and is located in the town of Huntly in the Waikato. It is operated by Genesis Energy Limited, a publicly listed company (51% owned by the New Zealand Government). The station has five operational generating units – three 250 MW coal-and-gas-fired steam turbine units, a 50 MW gas peaking plant, and a 403 MW combined cycle gas turbine plant – as well as a 100 MW / 200 MWh grid battery. The station also plays an important role in voltage support for the Northland, Auckland and Waikato regions.

== Operation ==
=== Generation ===
Each of the four original conventional generating units, installed in stages between 1973 and 1985, can burn either coal or gas and generate 250 MW (megawatts) of electricity, giving a historical generating capacity of 1000 MW. Its chimneys are 150 metres high and each chimney has two flues that are 7 metres in diameter. The plant uses a reheat steam cycle, with C A Parsons turbines and Combustion Engineering boilers.

In 2004 the station was expanded with the addition of a 50 MW gas turbine plant (unit 6). In 2007 a combined cycle gas turbine (CCGT) plant (unit 5) was commissioned, adding 403 MW (250 MW gas turbine + 153 MW steam turbine) of generating capacity, and taking the total capacity to 1453 MW.

In 2007, Huntly operated at a load factor of 85% and was providing a large amount of the baseload energy needs of the northern North Island. In 2007, the plant was mainly gas-fired, but a dry winter in 2008 prompted more coal thermal generation.

In December 2012, Genesis Energy placed one of the four 250 MW units into long-term storage. The second coal-fired 250 MW unit was permanently retired in June 2015 after being placed in storage (with a 90 day return to service) in 2013.

In February 2021, a third 250 MW unit was brought back online to assist with drought and gas shortages and made available until September 2021. Most of the coal it is burning is imported from Indonesia, with much of it coming to Huntly by truck from Ports of Auckland, while some comes by rail from the Port of Tauranga. Genesis announced in September 2025 that it would start burning more New Zealand coal, although the majority would still be imported.

=== Fuel and coolant ===
The four 250 MW units were constructed as dual fuel, able to operate on natural gas from Taranaki or coal from the nearby Rotowaro coal mine. A 10 km conveyor belt was constructed to carry coal from the mine to the power station.

Previous to the substitution of coal, Huntly used gas from the fields to power the generation of the main units as well, but these were switched in the 1990s because of dwindling resources.

Natural gas to power units 5 and 6 comes from several gas fields in Taranaki. The gas is transmitted along the 307 km, 750 mm diameter Maui gas pipeline from Oaonui production station near Opunake, which was commissioned in 1979 to supply the station.

The station uses water from the Waikato River for cooling. However, in order to protect aquatic life, conditions are imposed by the resource consent (issued under the Resource Management Act), specifying the quantity of water that can be removed by the station along with the maximum temperature of the water when returned to the river (25 °C). These conditions mean that on very hot summer days the station cannot operate at maximum capacity, and has sometimes effectively been shut down. A new cooling tower has been built as part of expansion works at the site, which allows one 250 MW unit to run at full load even during such times.

=== Battery Energy Storage ===
A 100 MW / 200 MWh battery was commissioned in October 2026 after being announced in 2024 and construction beginning in June 2025.

=== Transmission and distribution ===
The majority of the energy generated at Huntly Power Station is transmitted through the national grid to Auckland, New Zealand's largest city, which lies 95 kilometres (59 mi) to the north of the station.

Huntly is connected to the rest of the national grid via a large substation switchyard and six 220 kV transmission circuits carried on three high capacity transmission lines.

The Huntly switchyard also includes a grid exit point for supply to the local 33 kV distribution network in the Huntly area, where the 35 MW / 35 MWh Rotohiko battery started in 2024.

== Future ==
The plant contributes over half of New Zealand's emissions of greenhouse gases from electricity generation, has repeatedly drawn the ire of environmentalists and has been the focus of associated protests. A 2006 government report outlining future climate change mitigation and energy policies was seen by the operator as a sign that the plant might have to be closed by 2015 under these plans, with around 10 years of design life still remaining. It was also noted that, apart from being difficult to replace as a source of power (due to New Zealand's annually growing generation demand, especially around Auckland), such a decision would also be uneconomical for the foreseeable future, even if coal prices were to rise.

In May 2012, resource consent was granted by the Waikato Regional Council to continue running the gas and coal units for a period of 25 years.

In April 2016, Genesis Energy announced that the Huntly Power Station would continue operation of its two remaining coal / gas burning units until December 2022. The two gas turbine generators would continue to operate into the future.

Company chief executive Marc England has stated "By 2025, Genesis will only use coal in its thermal units in abnormal market conditions, and it is our intent to remove coal completely by 2030".

Genesis planned a trial of bio-fuel over summer 2022/23.

== In popular culture ==
The Huntly Power Station features in the video for the Purple Pilgrims song "Two Worlds Apart".

The station is featured as an external setting for the 2002 television film Atomic Twister as the Hellman-Klein Nuclear Power Plant in Tennessee, and the 2025 theatrical film A Minecraft Movie as a potato chip factory in the fictional town of Chuglass, Idaho.

== See also ==
- Electricity sector in New Zealand
- List of power stations in New Zealand
- Manapōuri Power Station, the second largest power station in New Zealand
