= Victoria Carter =

New Zealand politician and businesswoman

Victoria Carter ONZM
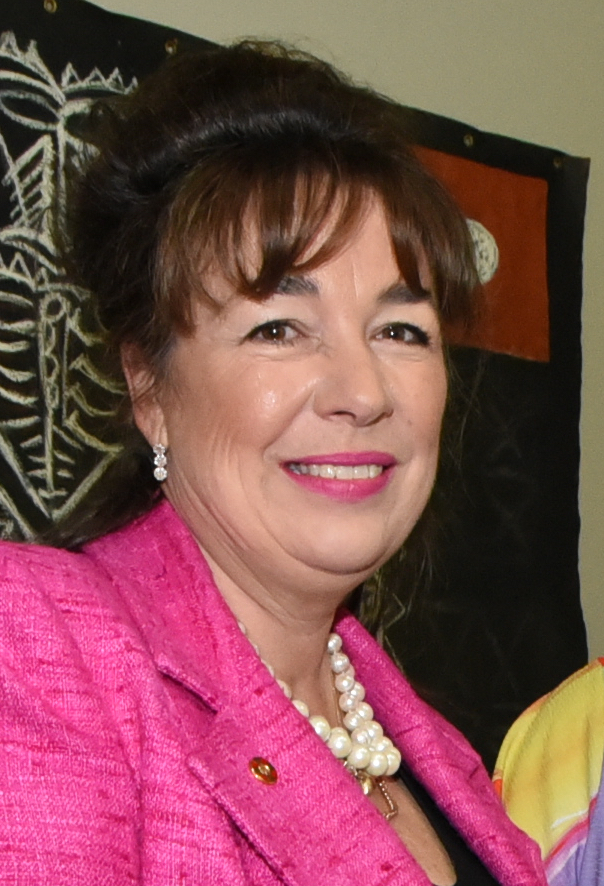
- Carter in 2019

Personal details
- Born: England
- Education: University of Auckland
- Occupation: Company director and Businesswoman

Victoria Mary Carter ONZM is a former New Zealand politician. She is now a professional company director and businesswoman.

== Early life ==
Victoria Carter,(nee Davies-Booth) was born in England, her parents are journalist Valerie Davies and now-retired British Army Colonel, Col Nicolas Davies. Her grandfather was the Vicar of St Mary's Church, Twickenham, Rev WJ Davies.

Carter came to New Zealand with her mother and brother in 1970, after her parents separated. Her mother later married journalist, Pat Booth.

She went to nine schools including Parnell School, Ararimu, Pukekohe High School and Baradene College.

In 1990, Victoria married John Carter, a former legal partner of McElroy Milne and later Carter & Partners. Victoria and John have two sons.

== Early career ==
Carter holds a law degree from the University of Auckland and has a varied background in public relations, marketing, and governance.

Before graduation she worked at Butler White & Hanna. Rob Fenwick offered her a job in financial public relations at Allan Fenwick McCully. She later became PR director for McConnell Dowell group of companies, including InterPacific, Trustees Executors and National Insurance.

In the mid 80's Carter began her own public relations firm acting for clients including Television New Zealand, Farmers Trading, Bayleys Real Estate and other property clients.

In 1995 Victoria Carter was seconded to the board of the Auckland Kindergarten Association, going on to be Vice President and ending up as the President of the Association until 2005. The AKA was the largest educational organization outside of the tertiary sector. Carter advocated for increased funding and raised the awareness of the changing face of Auckland with kindergartens having so many ethnicities and cultures within them.

== Political career ==
Victoria Carter was elected as an Auckland City Councillor in 1998 when she top-polled in the Hobson ward. A year earlier, Carter was the first independent trustee to be elected to the Auckland Energy Consumer Trust in 1997, but had to resign from this position when elected to Auckland City Council.

She served as Chair of City Attractions at Auckland City Council and led the public private partnership that saw the indoor arena at Quay Street built. Carter also restarted the Auckland Arts Festival which she chaired until June 2015.

Carter deliberately left politics in 2004 saying she wanted to go back into business. She then co-owned a CBD hotel and co-founded a business.

== Later career ==
Carter co-founded Cityhop, New Zealand’s first car sharing company with Jucy Rentals. JUCY later exited Cityhop and Carter and her son grew the business before selling to Toyota Financial Services in November 2018. She is a vocal advocate of car share service for cities battling congestion.

Carter has served on over 25 boards including Kidicorp - now Best Start, Turner's Auctions, NZ Thoroughbred Racing, Auckland Racing Club and Jucy Rentals. She has been a Council appointee to the Auckland Regional Amenities Funding Board since 2017 and is presently Chairperson. In May 2018 Carter was elected as the first female President of the Northern Club.

When Deputy Chair of NZTR, Carter was appointed to the Asian Racing Federation and the IFHA. She has spoken at several Asian Racing conferences and IFHA meets. In Korea she gave a keynote speech on 'why racing needs more women,' presenting research on how diversity results in more collaboration, innovation and transformation.

In Paris 2019, she spoke on consumer and political perceptions of horse racing and its impact. In Cape Town, at the 38th Asian Racing Conference in 2020, Victoria Carter spoke about the mental health of jockeys and the part regulators could play. She then led a panel with leading jockeys Michelle Payne, Anthony Delpech and psychologist Kirsten van Heerden.

In September 2019 Minister of Transport Phil Twyford appointed her to the Board of Waka Kotahi, NZ Transport Agency. She chaired the People & Culture committee.

Carter is also an Independent Director of Ngati Awa Group Holdings, the commercial arm of Ngati Awa Runanga in the Bay of Plenty. In 2020, Carter advocated to "save Laura Fergusson, a much loved gym, pool, home and facility in Auckland for the physically disabled." Ultimately, the land was sold and residents were moved out.

In 2023 Carter became Chair of Laura Fergusson Trust.

In 2023 she began a regular column in Businessdesk called Failfile.

== Honours and awards ==
In 2013 Carter was named in the inaugural Global Forty Over 40 list. She was the only Australasian selected.

She was a finalist in the arts category of the Women of Influence awards in 2013 and 2014 for her work with the Auckland Arts Festival.

In the 2016 New Year Honours, Carter was appointed an Officer of the New Zealand Order of Merit for service to arts, business, and the community.

In 2024 Baradene College awarded Victoria Carter the ‘Cor Unum Alumnae Meritae' award which pays tribute to Sacre Coeur alumna who have embraced the philosophy of the Sacred Heart in their everyday life.
