= Cityhop =

New Zealand car share service

- Type: Private
- Industry: Car sharing
- Founded: 2007, Auckland
- Founder: Victoria Carter ONZM
- Headquarters: Auckland, New Zealand
- Area served: Auckland, Wellington
- Products: Car sharing
- Website: www.cityhop.co.nz

Cityhop is New Zealand's first carsharing service operating in Auckland, Christchurch and Wellington. It was founded by former Auckland City councillor Victoria Carter with Jucy Rentals. In 2018, Cityhop has 80 vehicles and more than 3000 active drivers. It was bought by Toyota New Zealand in November 2018 and had about 6,000 members and 120 vehicles in 2019. As of 2020 Cityhop now has over 150 cars and vans across Auckland and Wellington with over 10,000 members.

Cityhop was launched in Auckland in August 2007 by Prime Minister Helen Clark and began with three cars in Auckland Council carparks. This was followed by three cars in Wellington in late 2008. Expansion to Christchurch and Queenstown is planned.

Cityhop follows traditional carsharing principles with car bookings done online or over the phone, keyless car entry by keycard, and dedicated carshare parking spaces for each vehicle. Users pay an annual fee and cars are available by an hourly rate which includes petrol, insurance, maintenance, and cleaning. Most vehicles are late model hatchbacks or sedans and each car is located in an onstreet carpark or offstreet carpark in a highly populated part of the CBD or city fringe. Cityhop has partnered with Z Energy to provide carshare carparks on service station forecourts.

== See also ==
- Alternatives to the automobile
- Carsharing
