= Art student scam =

Confidence trick

The art student scam is a confidence trick in which cheap, mass-produced paintings or prints are misrepresented as original works of art, often by young people pretending to be art students trying to raise money for art supplies or tuition fees. The sellers mostly represented themselves as French art students, but the scam has recently been copied internationally, with instances of Israeli, Chinese, Chilean, Nigerian and other nationalities posing as art students or dealers in Australia, Canada, China, Ireland, New Zealand and the United States since around 2000. The art is often sold in exhibition sites or art galleries. Many scammers operate alongside and at the long-run expense of genuine art students who show their yearly work in festivals during the summer vacation.

== Mass-produced paintings ==
Most mass-produced prints and paintings originate in Asia. These are essentially posters, sometimes referred to as "Hong Kong horrors," printed on rough paper, making the absence of brush strokes less apparent. There is a confusion between "mass-produced paintings" which are actually prints. These are being sold over the internet described as real oil paintings, taking advantage of the difficulty of spotting the scam behind the screen. Sometimes, a few brush strokes are added to the prints to give them a more authentic oil-painting look.

== Australia and New Zealand ==
People posing as art students were reported in Australia and New Zealand from as early as 2003. The paintings, worth around A$5, were passed off as being worth hundreds of dollars. Three backpackers—an Israeli and two Chileans—were taken to court in Dunedin for the scam in 2003 but were discharged as the judge said that they were "minnows" in the organisation. They reportedly made NZ$15,000 in three weeks from the scam. The Consumers' Institute of New Zealand suspected that an Auckland man was the organiser of the operation. A 23-year-old man was arrested in New South Wales, Australia, for operating the scam and 50 oil paintings were found in his car. An adviser for the New Zealand Consumer Affairs Ministry said: "All around the world, students from various countries are doing this." She suggested that the scam's organiser may place advertisements in backpackers' lodges to recruit students. The scammers have also claimed to be Greek, Argentinian, and French.

== Canada ==
In 2004, a group of Russians said to have been selling mass-produced paintings as their own work, for hundreds of dollars each, were deported from Canada for working in violation of their visas. The scam recurred in 2009 in Calgary and in Warman, Saskatchewan. Eight people claiming to be students from Israel, Russia, Germany, and France were arrested, and 100 paintings were seized by the Royal Canadian Mounted Police and Border Services.

== China ==
In China, scammers approach tourists at popular attractions such as the Forbidden City and Tiananmen Square. The scammer speaks English well enough to get into a conversation with the foreigner and then claims to be an art student whose works are on display at a nearby exhibition, which is part of the scam and sells mass-produced art reproductions at exorbitant prices. There are warnings about this scam in tourist guides.

== United States ==
From the summer of 2000, news outlets in the Pacific Northwest reported that young people were posing as art students selling mass-produced oil paintings, both copies and originals, for US$780–$2,000 each. The so-called art students were said to be selling in exhibitions and galleries, primarily targeting local businesses. They claimed to be Israeli citizens studying at art schools in Europe and to be in the United States selling works by talented fellow artists to raise money for art supplies or school fees.

Through the early 2000s, some 13 separate incidents of "art student" encounters were reported across the United States.
