= Powershop =

Electric power company in New Zealand

Powershop NZ
- Company type: Subsidiary
- Founded: 2007
- Headquarters: Wellington, New Zealand
- Area served: In New Zealand: Auckland, Hamilton, Tauranga, Rotorua, Taupo, Napier, Hastings, New Plymouth, Wanganui, Palmerston North, Wairarapa, Wellington, Christchurch, Dunedin, Queenstown, Invercargill
- Founder: Ari Sargent
- Key people: Margaret Cooney, Head of Powershop
- Industry: Electricity retailing
- Products: Electricity
- Employees: Over 200
- Parent: Meridian Energy

Powershop Australia
- Founded: 2012
- Headquarters: Melbourne, Australia
- Area served: In Australia: Victoria, New South Wales, South East Queensland and South Australia.
- Key people: Ed McManus, CEO
- Industry: Electricity retailing
- Products: Electricity & Gas
- Employees: 150
- Parent: Shell Australia

Powershop UK
- Founded: 2016
- Dissolved: 2021
- Successor: E.ON Next
- Headquarters: Birmingham, United Kingdom
- Area served: In the United Kingdom: England, Wales and Southern Scotland
- Key people: David Winter, Head of Powershop UK
- Industry: Energy retailing
- Products: Electricity, gas
- Employees: 10–50
- Parent: NPower

Powershop is an online electricity retailer founded in New Zealand, and also available in Australia. In New Zealand, Powershop is a subsidiary of Meridian Energy, 50.4% of which is owned by the New Zealand Government. The retailer operates through an online platform offering pre-pay and post-pay options.

In November 2021, it was announced that a consortium of Shell Australia and Infrastructure Capital Group would be acquiring Meridian Energy Australia Group, including Powershop Australia. Though subject to regulatory approvals, the transition was due to be completed in early 2022. This development caused an uproar among many customers who opposed the takeover of Australia's greenest electricity provider by a multinational oil company.

== History ==
Meridian Energy traditionally had been a major electricity generator, but only a small retailer. In 2006, Ari Sargent, a veteran of the electricity industry, presented the idea of selling electricity as a "fast-moving consumer item" to Meridian Energy. Initially, they planned to sell electricity tokens in supermarkets, but they abandoned that idea due to cost and instead considered setting up an Internet marketplace.

Sargent, with Simon Coley, a design specialist, founded Powershop in September 2007. In September 2008, Powershop bought its predecessor, Meridian Energy's Marketplace Innovations Business Unit, for NZ$1.26 million in stock. After 14 months of private beta testing, it was made unofficially available to all before being officially launched to the public on 22 February 2009.

== Reception ==
Powershop projected 40,000 to 50,000 customers in its first year. Powershop reached 5,000 customers in October 2009, and 10,000 customers in February 2010. CEO Ari Sargent blamed this on inertia and general distrust of power companies. Energy expert Molly Melhuish claims that because "people are so terrified of their power bills", "a majority of people" wouldn't want to try a new concept like Powershop."

In an article published three days following the public launch of Powershop, The Consumers' Institute of New Zealand tentatively suggested that the service may save consumers money. They stated that they "welcome any initiatives to increase retail power competition", but are clear that "It's too early to tell whether you'll save money by changing to Powershop." and suggest that wintertime indoor heating may completely negate the cost-saving potential of the service.

In a 2009 survey by the Ministry of Economic Development, Powershop was found to be the cheapest electricity retailer for the typical consumer (one who consumes 8,000 kWh/year) in Auckland, Wellington, Christchurch, Dunedin, Manawatū, and New Plymouth. It was the second cheapest in Whanganui and Wairarapa.

In Consumers' Institute of New Zealand's 2009 survey of consumer satisfaction with electricity companies, 92% of Powershop's 111 responding customers found it 'good' or 'very good', and it received zero 'poor' ratings. In 2010, it again received a 92% satisfaction rating. In 2011 and 2012, it garnered a 96% customer satisfaction rating.
