= Energy Direct =

Former New Zealand electricity and gas retailer

Energy Direct NZ
- Founded: 2001
- Dissolved: 2016
- Successor: Trustpower
- Area served: North Island, New Zealand
- Industry: Electricity and gas retailing
- Products: Electricity, gas
- Parent: Trustpower

Energy Direct NZ Ltd was an electricity and gas retailer in New Zealand. It was acquired by Trustpower in mid-2013. Previously, it was a trading division of the Wanganui Gas Company Limited, which the Whanganui District Council wholly owns.

In 2011, Consumer NZ rated Energy Direct as one of the top power companies in New Zealand in its annual survey.

The name Energy Direct was also used by the Hutt Valley Electric Power Board (HVEPB) in the early 1990s.

Energy Direct closed in 2016, and its customers were transferred to Trustpower.

== See also ==
- Electricity sector in New Zealand
- New Zealand electricity market
