= AECT =

AECT may refer to:

- Auckland Energy Consumer Trust, now Entrust, a trust for electricity consumers in Auckland, New Zealand
- Association for Educational Communications and Technology, in the US
