= Hau Nui Wind Farm =

Wind farm in New Zealand

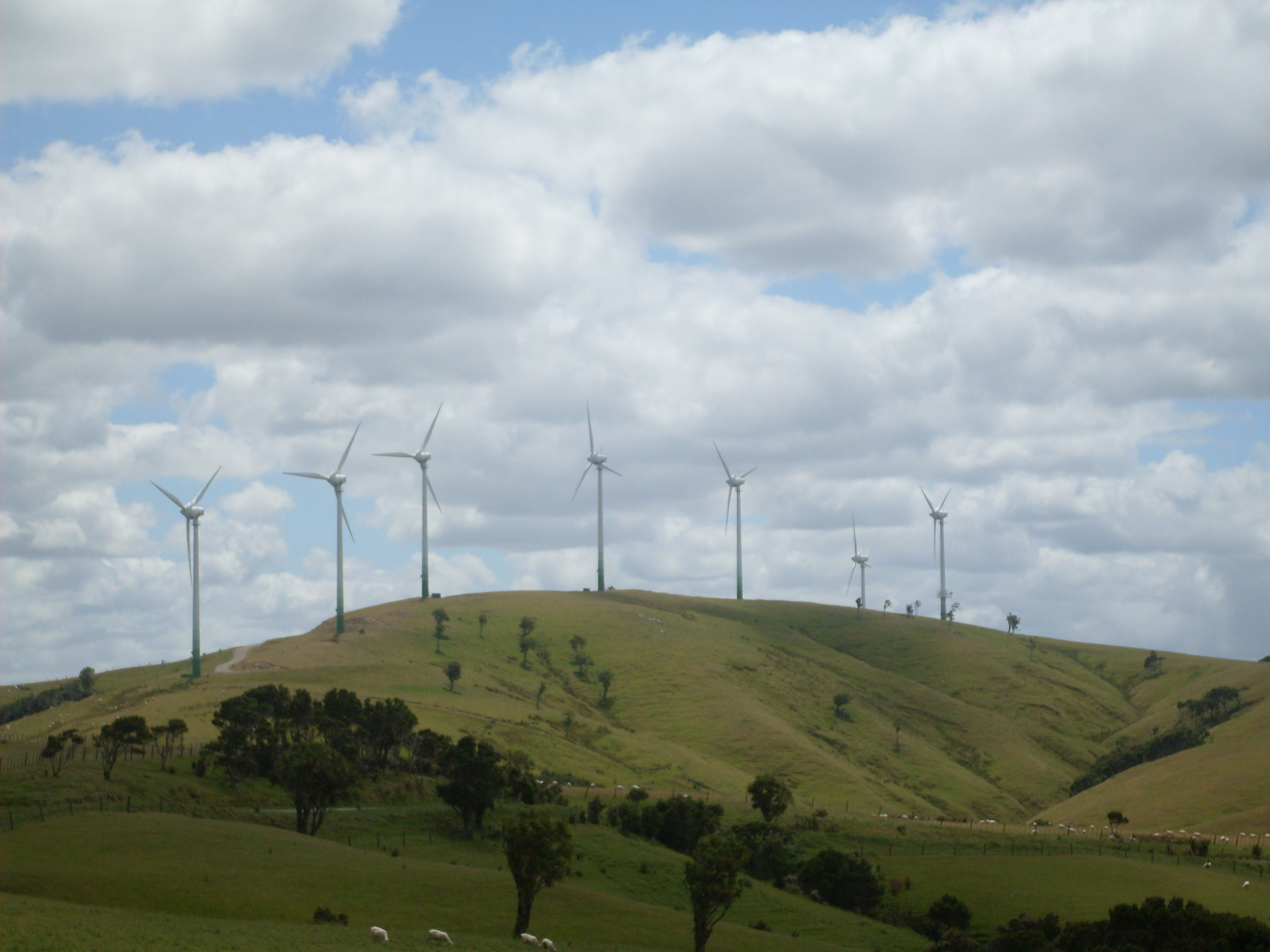
- The seven stage 1 turbines from Range Road
- Country: New Zealand
- Location: south-east of Martinborough, Wellington region
- Coordinates: 41°21′42″S 175°29′2″E
- Status: Operational
- Commission date: 1996, 2004

Wind farm
- Type: Onshore
- Hub height: 46 m (151 ft)
- Rotor diameter: 40 m (131 ft)

Power generation
- Units operational: 15
- Make and model: Enercon: E-40
- Nameplate capacity: 8.65 MW
- Capacity factor: 29.0%
- Annual net output: 22 GWh

External links
- Website: www.genesisenergy.co.nz/hau-nui-wind-farm

The Hau Nui Wind Farm is a 15-turbine wind farm located approximately 21 kilometres (13 mi) south-east of Martinborough, in the South Wairarapa District of New Zealand. Hau Nui (Māori for "big wind") was the first wind farm built in New Zealand.

The wind farm was built in two stages and the completed capacity is 8.65 MW. Originally owned by Genesis Energy, in October 2024 the farm was sold to NZ Windfarms. In July 2025, Meridian Energy acquired NZ Windfarms, including Hau Nui Wind Farm.

== Site ==
Hau Nui wind farm is located on a ridge adjacent to White Rock Road, the main road between Martinborough and White Rock. Stage 1 is situated on Range Road near its intersection with White Rock Road. Stage 2 is located approximately one kilometre south of Stage 1 on Range Road.

The site has an average wind speed of 9.2–9.5 metres per second (30–31 ft/s).

== Turbines ==
Hau Nui has a total of fifteen Enercon E-40 wind turbines. The seven Stage 1 turbines are third-generation turbines, delivering 550 kW each. The eight Stage 2 turbines are later versions of the same Enercon E-40 model, each generating 600 kW each.

The turbines in both stages are 46 metres (151 ft) tall to the hub, and have rotor diameters of 40 metres (131 ft).

== Transmission ==
Electricity generated by Hau Nui is injected into the local distribution grid. The 400 V electricity generated by each turbine is stepped up by transformers at the base of the turbine - to 11,000 V for stage 1 turbines and 33,000 V for stage 2 turbines.

33 kV lines from stage 2 take electricity 24 kilometres (15 mi) to Martinborough to supply the town. Stage 1 turbines connect to 11 kV lines to supply the local area, or connect to the Stage 2 to Martinborough 33 kV lines through a 750 kVA transformer to the north side of the stage.

During peak demand, electricity generated by Hau Nui is used by Martinborough and the eastern South Wairarapa district. During off-peak, Hau Nui electricity can supply the entire South Wairarapa district via 33 kV lines connecting Martinborough with Featherston, Greytown, and Pirinoa. If local demand is low, some electricity may be exported to the national grid through Transpower's Greytown substation.

== See also ==
- Wind power in New Zealand
