= Lake George Scott =

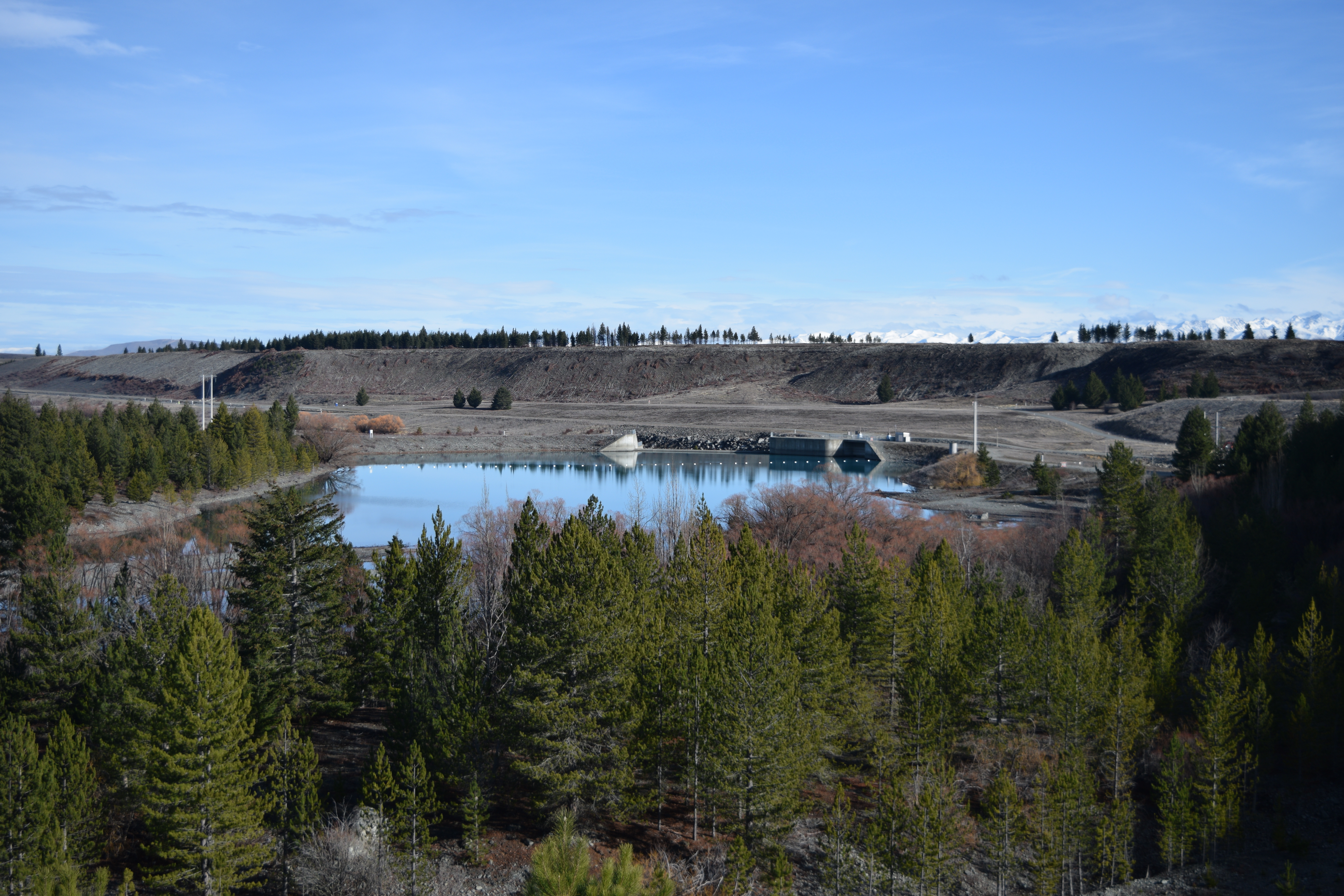

- Location within South Island
- Location: Mackenzie District, Canterbury Region, South Island
- Coordinates: 44°00′55″S 170°27′47″E
- Type: reservoir
- Primary inflows: Tekapo River
- Basin countries: New Zealand
- Max. length: 500 m (1,600 ft)
- Max. width: 150 m (490 ft)
- Surface elevation: 755 m (2,477 ft)

Lake George Scott, also called Scott Pond, is a small lake situated on the Tekapo River approximately 3 kilometres downstream of Lake Tekapo, New Zealand. It is a man-made lake formed to divert water from the river into the Tekapo hydro electric canal. The Lake is named after the late George Scott, a former superintendent of the nearby Tekapo A Power Station. The Department of Conservation maintains a walkway to the lake from the Lake Tekapo Township.
