= Gary War =

- Also known as: Phil Gone, Dalthom
- Born: Greg Dalton; Boston, Massachusetts, United States
- Origin: New York City, New York, United States
- Genres: Hypnagogic pop
- Years active: 1999–present
- Labels: Spectrum Spools, Sacred Bones, Upset The Rhythm, Captured Tracks
- Website: garywar.com

Greg Dalton, also known by the moniker Gary War, is an American musician whose recordings combine elements of psychedelia, garage rock, synth-pop, and shoegaze. He is a former member of Ariel Pink's Haunted Graffiti and has released three albums, a split LP with Purple Pilgrims, two EPs and several singles. Currently, he is based in New Zealand.

== Career ==
Dalton is originally from Gloucester, Massachusetts.

In July 2012, he released Jared's Lot on the Austrian Spectrum Spools label, and toured in support of it. He also collaborated with Taylor Richardson as Human Teenager, and released the album Animal Husbandry in the same year. Towards the end of that year, he moved to New Zealand.

In November 2013 War shared an album with the New Zealand duo Purple Pilgrims, contributing four songs to the release on Upset The Rhythm.

== Discography ==
=== Studio albums ===
- New Raytheonport LP (2008, SHDWPLY Records)
- Horribles Parade LP (2009, Sacred Bones Records)
- Jared's Lot LP (2012, Spectrum Spools)
- Gaz Forth LP (2018, Feeding Tube)

=== EPs ===
- Galactic Citizens 12" (2009, Captured Tracks)
- Police Water 12" (2010, Sacred Bones Records)
- Gary War/Purple Pilgrims Split LP (2013, Upset The Rhythm)

=== Other releases ===
- "Anhedonic Man" 7" (2009, Hell, Yes!)
- "Zontag" 7" (2009, Sacred Bones Records)
- "Reality Protest" 7" (2009, Sacred Bones/Holidays Records)
- "Opens" Cassette (2009, Captured Tracks)
