= Entrust (community trust) =

Entrust, formerly named Auckland Energy Consumer Trust (AECT) prior to June 2016, is a trust for electricity consumers in Auckland, New Zealand. Formed in 1993 as sole owner of the original Mercury Energy Limited, it is now majority owner of electricity and gas distributor Vector Limited, a child of the original Mercury, the other child being the retailing division of Mercury Energy. The Trust will be wound up in 2073 (80 years after its formation) and its assets transferred to the local government authority or authorities in the Trust district (at present this would be Auckland Council). There have been calls for the Trust to be wound up sooner.

AECT owned 75.1% of the shares in Vector in 2015, worth about $2 billion. It holds the shares on behalf of Vector's 300,000 customers and distributes dividends from Vector to its customers. The remaining 24.9% of Vector shares are traded on the NZX Main Board stock exchange.

As part of electricity industry reforms in 1993, the consumer-owned Auckland Electric Power Board became Mercury Energy Limited and AECT was set up to own it, keeping control in the hands of electricity consumers. Similar trusts were established elsewhere in the country. Mercury was the electricity distributor and retailer for Auckland, Manukau and Papakura. In 1998 the government split the electricity sector into distributors (lines companies) and retailers, and accordingly Mercury was split. The retail business was sold to Mighty River Power and the lines business being kept and renamed Vector Limited. AECT was the sole owner of Vector until 2005, when it allowed Vector to make a public float of 24.9% of its shares to raise capital to buy gas company NGC Holdings.

== Election of trustees ==
Campaign posters in the 2009 election

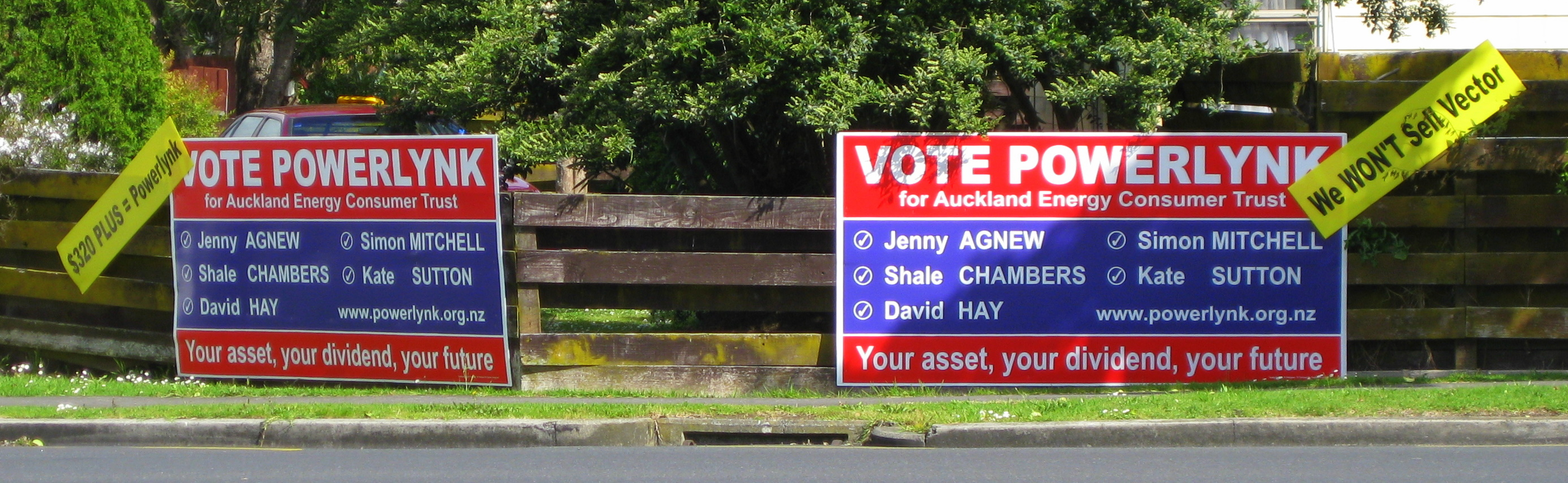
Powerlynk

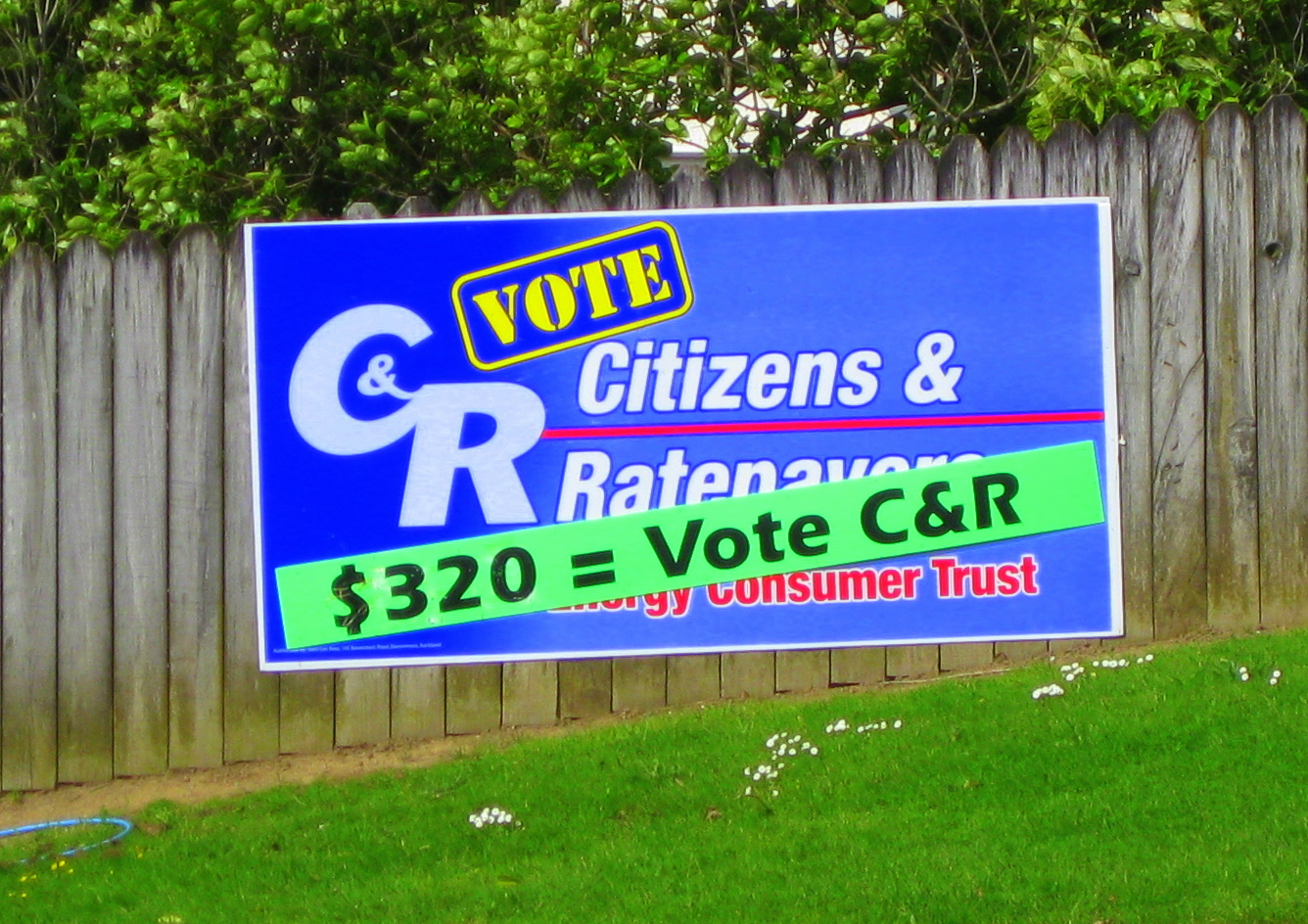
C&R

The trust is run by five trustees elected using the plurality-at-large method every three years in line with the requirements of the Trust Deed. Trustees are electricity customers who live in the Trust area.

The right-leaning C & R – Communities and Residents ticket has dominated election results for the five trust seats in recent years, and under its previous names Citizens & Ratepayers NOW and Citizens & Ratepayers in earlier years. The ticket has long been aligned with the National Party.

In 1997 the first and last Independent Trustee, Victoria Carter was elected to the Board. In 1998, the lights went out for six weeks in Auckland. The Government called for an enquiry.

=== 2003 election ===
2003 trustee election results for the five seats on the trust:

Affiliation	Name	Votes
Citizens & Ratepayers NOW	John Collinge	26,049
Citizens & Ratepayers NOW	Michael Buczkowski	24,567
Citizens & Ratepayers NOW	Karen Sherry	22,830
Citizens & Ratepayers NOW	Warren Kyd	21,962
Powerlynk	Shale Chambers	20,822

=== 2006 election ===
2006 trustee election results for the five seats on the trust:

Affiliation	Name	Votes
Citizens & Ratepayers NOW	Karen Sherry	22,357
Citizens & Ratepayers NOW	Michael Buczkowski	20,129
Citizens & Ratepayers NOW	Warren Kyd	19,742
Powerlynk	Shale Chambers	18,563
Citizens & Ratepayers NOW	James Carmichael	16,829

=== 2009 election ===
2009 trustee election results for the five seats on the trust:

Affiliation	Name	Votes
Citizens & Ratepayers	Karen Sherry	22,752
Citizens & Ratepayers	Warren Kyd	22,129
Citizens & Ratepayers	Michael Buczkowski	21,665
Citizens & Ratepayers	James Carmichael	21,140
Citizens & Ratepayers	William Cairns	16,793

=== 2012 election ===
2012 trustee election results for the five seats on the trust:

Affiliation	Name	Votes
C & R – Communities and Residents	Karen Sherry	27,483
C & R – Communities and Residents	Michael Buczkowski	24,217
C & R – Communities and Residents	Warren Kyd	23,388
C & R – Communities and Residents	James Carmichael	23,355
C & R – Communities and Residents	William Cairns	21,665

=== 2015 election ===
2015 trustee election results for the five seats on the trust:

Affiliation	Name	Votes
C & R – Communities and Residents	Karen Sherry	20,968
C & R – Communities and Residents	Michael Buczkowski	19,761
C & R – Communities and Residents	James Carmichael	19,390
C & R – Communities and Residents	William Cairns	17,824
C & R – Communities and Residents	Paul Hutchison	16,942

=== 2018 election ===
2018 trustee election results for the five seats on the trust:

Affiliation	Name	Votes
C & R – Communities and Residents	Karen Sherry	23,958
C & R – Communities and Residents	Alastair Bell	21,198
C & R – Communities and Residents	Michael Buczkowski	19,645
C & R – Communities and Residents	Paul Hutchison	19,533
C & R – Communities and Residents	William Cairns	18,730

=== 2021 election ===
2021 trustee election results for the five seats on the trust:

Affiliation	Name	Votes
C & R – Communities and Residents	Alastair Bell	16,403
C & R – Communities and Residents	Michael Buczkowski	15,533
C & R – Communities and Residents	Denise Lee	15,274
C & R – Communities and Residents	Paul Hutchison	13,417
C & R – Communities and Residents	William Cairns	11,892

=== 2024 election ===
2024 trustee election results for the five seats on the trust:

Affiliation	Name	Votes
C & R – Communities and Residents	Alastair Bell	17,232
C & R – Communities and Residents	Rachel Langton	15,870
C & R – Communities and Residents	Denise Lee	15,479
C & R – Communities and Residents	Paul Hutchison	15,325
C & R – Communities and Residents	Angus Ogilvie	12,605

== See also ==
- New Zealand electricity market
