= Yourdrive =

Defunct New Zealand peer-to-peer carsharing company

- Type: Private
- Industry: Car sharing, peer-to-peer car rental, collaborative consumption
- Founded: 2014, Auckland
- Founder: Oscar Ellison
- Headquarters: Auckland, New Zealand
- Area served: Auckland, Hamilton, Palmerston North, Wellington, Christchurch, Dunedin
- Key people: Oscar Ellison (Founder & CEO)
- Products: Car sharing
- Services: Peer-to-peer car rental, car sharing, car rental
- Owner: OE Capital, Jucy Rentals
- Number of employees: 8

Yourdrive was a New Zealand peer-to-peer carsharing company. Prior to ceasing operations it facilitated a system in which individuals could rent their privately owned vehicles on an hourly, daily or weekly basis to other registered users of the service. Owners set their rental prices and earn a 60 percent commission from the rental revenue. Prior to going out of business it operated throughout New Zealand with vehicles in Auckland, Hamilton, Palmerston North, Wellington, Christchurch, Queenstown and Dunedin.

New Zealand rental car firm Jucy Rentals purchased 50% of the company in 2016

Peer-to-peer carsharing is an example of collaborative consumption, where assets and skills are shared or traded between neighbours for sustainability and economic benefit. Although car sharing is relatively new in New Zealand it is an area that is being encouraged due to the environmental and economic benefits. Auckland Transport is promoting a scheme that would drastically increase the number of car sharing vehicles.

In March 2020 Yourdrive announced that it had ceased all operations due to lack of revenue.

== See also ==
- Peer-to-peer car rental
- Carsharing
- Alternatives to the automobile
- Car rental
