= Tekapo A Power Station =

Hydroelectric power station in Canterbury, New Zealand

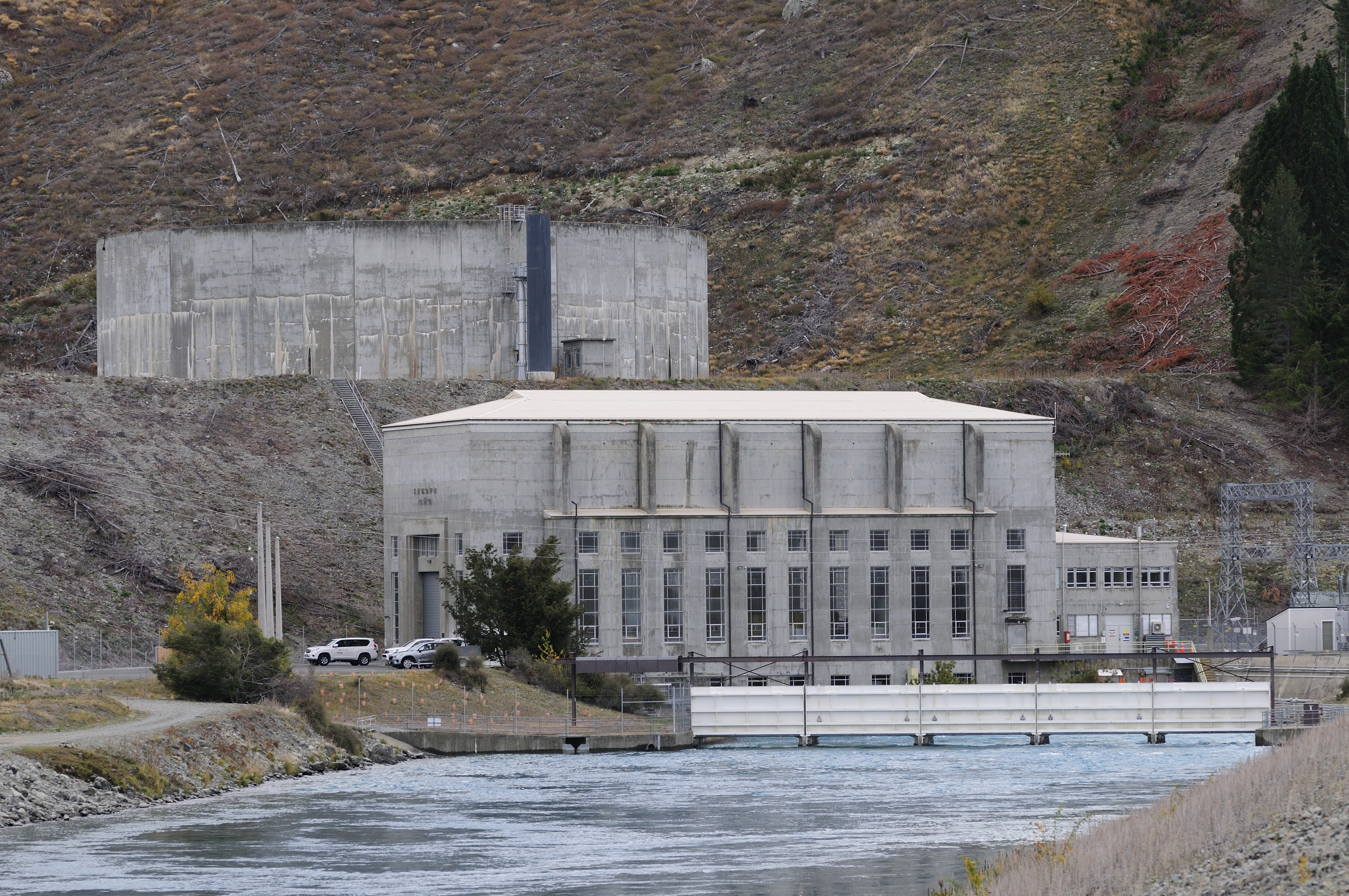
- Tekapo A Power Plant pictured in 2016, with the surge tank visible above it
- Country: New Zealand
- Location: Canterbury
- Coordinates: 44.01382°S 170.46045°E
- Purpose: Power
- Status: Operational
- Construction began: 1938
- Owner(s): Genesis Energy Limited

Power Station
- Commission date: 1951
- Type: Conventional
- Turbines: 1
- Installed capacity: 30 MW (40,000 hp)
- 1981 net generation: 160 GW·h

The Tekapo A Power Station is a hydroelectric facility at the southern end of Lake Tekapo in the Mackenzie Basin, Canterbury, New Zealand. It is a short distance south of the township. The power station is owned and operated by Genesis Energy Limited.

== History ==
The station was the second to be built as part of the Upper Waitaki hydroelectric scheme. Construction on the Tekapo A Power Station began in 1938. Construction was interrupted by World War II due to shortages of labour and material. The original turbine, generator and transformer were manufactured by English Electric. The facility finally opened in 1951.

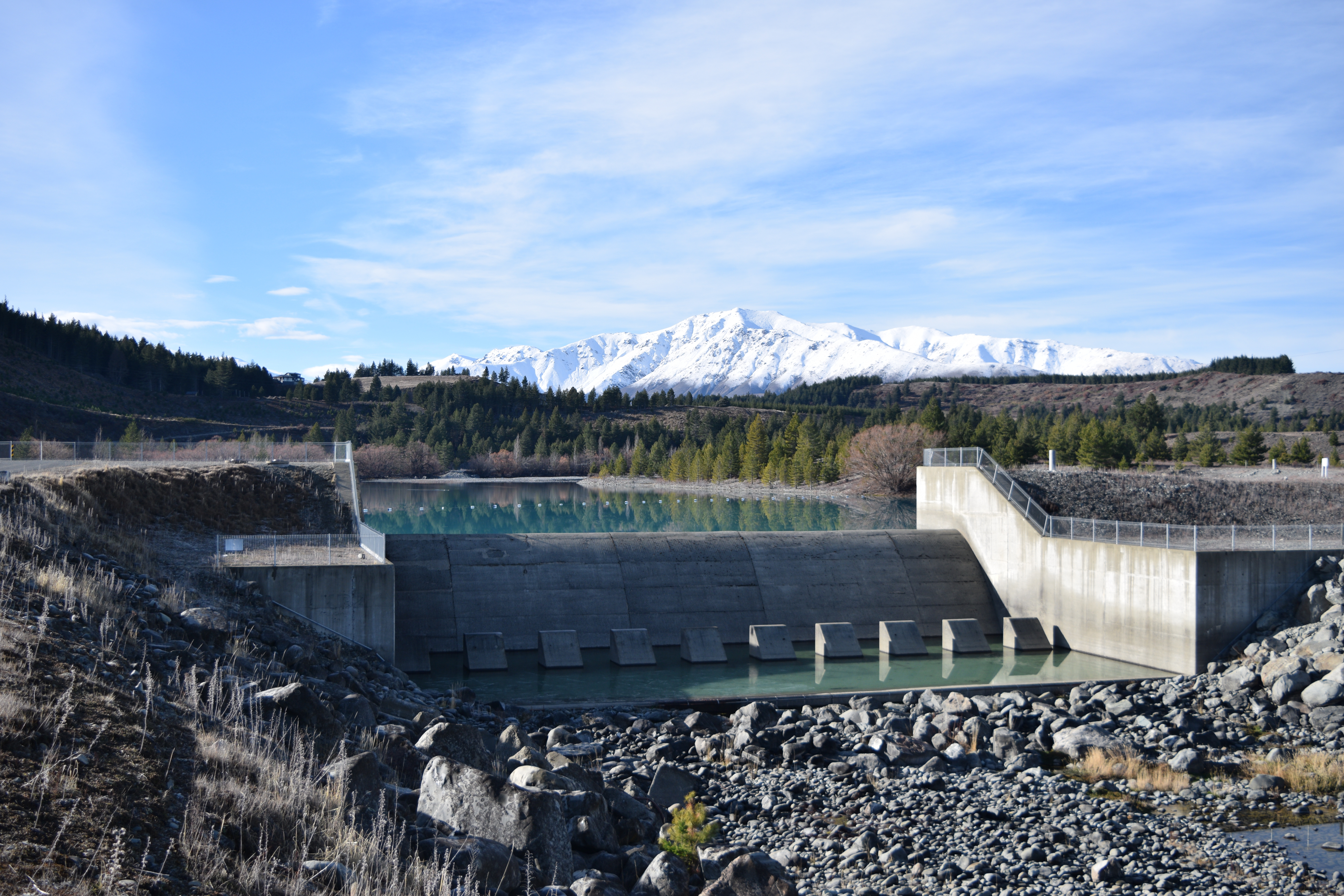
Lake George Scott was created to divert water from the Tekapo River to the Tekapo B Power Station

The facility was expanded in 1970 with the addition of a 25.5 kilometres (15.8 mi) canal to take outflow water to Lake Pukaki and the Tekapo B Power Station. Just to the east is the artificially-created Lake George Scott, which is part of the diversion of additional lakewater from the Tekapo River into the canal. Due to the diversion into the canal, the river is usually dry south of the power plant. When the lake level is high, gates can be opened to dump water back into the original bed of the river.

The penstock tunnel was dug through glacial moraine, which required the use of a "shield" held up by hydraulic supports, with reinforced concrete blocks inserted behind the tunnel-face to form the tunnel lining.

In 1986, three of the seven turbine blades broke off, destroying the turbine. A new turbine, manufactured in Finland, was installed to replace it.

The plant was owned by Meridian Energy until 2011, when it was purchased by Genesis Energy Limited under the direction of the New Zealand Government.

In 2021 earthquake engineering work was completed at the facility, including the installation of a new 50-tonne intake gate. The work cost NZ$25,600,000.

== Technical details ==
Water is taken from Lake Tekapo using an inlet structure at the southern end of the lake. The water then flows 1.4 kilometres (0.87 mi) south through a tunnel underneath the township to the power station. The tunnel has a diameter of 6.1 metres (20 ft). The water enters a surge tank, that is 18.3 metres (60 ft) high and has a diameter of 48.8 metres (160 ft). The surge tank is 30.5 metres (100 ft) above the powerhouse, which creates the effective head of the station.

The station features a single generator unit with an output of 30 megawatts (40,000 hp). It uses a vertical Kaplan turbine. Generated power is fed into the grid via an eastward 110 kilovolt overhead line to Timaru, managed by Transpower New Zealand. An additional 33kV overhead line managed by Alpine Energy goes westward to feed Mount Cook Village. The Tekapo A station can be isolated from the rest of the grid, creating a power "island" that contains only Tekapo, Fairlie, Albury and Mt Cook areas.

== See also ==
- Electricity sector in New Zealand
