= Electricity Commission (New Zealand) =

Agency overview
- Formed: 2003
- Dissolved: 2010
- Superseding agency: Electricity Authority (New Zealand)
- Jurisdiction: New Zealand
- Status: Dissolved
- Headquarters: Level 7, ASB Bank Tower, 2 Hunter Street, Wellington

The New Zealand Electricity Commission was a government authority set up in 2003 to regulate the electricity sector in New Zealand. It was succeeded by the Electricity Authority in November 2010.

The Commission was established under the Electricity Act to regulate the operation of the electricity industry and markets (both wholesale and retail) in accordance with government energy policy. The Commission was established following extremely dry hydro years in 2001 and 2003, which led to government concerns that the electricity market did not provide adequate security of electricity supply.

The first Electricity Commissioner was Roy Hemmingway, who was succeeded by David Caygill in 2007.

== See also ==
- Electricity Authority (New Zealand)
