= Genesis Energy Limited =

New Zealand electric utility gcompany

- Genesis Energy logo as of 2026
- Type: Public
- Traded as: NZX: GNE; ASX: GNE
- Industry: Energy
- Predecessor: Electricity Corporation of New Zealand
- Founded: 1999; 27 years ago
- Headquarters: Auckland, New Zealand
- Key people: Barbara Chapman, Chairman; Malcom Johns, Chief Executive
- Services: Electricity, Natural Gas, LPG
- Revenue: ▲NZ$3,662M (2025)
- Operating income: ▲NZ$470M
- Net income: ▲NZ$169M
- Total assets: ▲NZ$6,102M
- Total equity: ▲NZ$2,975M
- Owner: New Zealand Government (51%)
- Number of employees: 1,278
- Website: genesisenergy.co.nz

Genesis Energy Limited, formerly Genesis Power Limited is a New Zealand publicly listed electricity generation and electricity, natural gas and LPG retailing company. It was formed as part of the 1998–99 reform of the New Zealand electricity sector, taking its generation capacity from the breakup of the Electricity Corporation of New Zealand (ECNZ) and taking retail customers from three local power boards in the Lower North Island. The New Zealand Government owns a 51% share of the company.

Genesis Energy is one of the largest electricity and natural gas retailers in New Zealand with 23% and 33% market share respectively in the 2024-2025 financial year. In 2025, Genesis produced 15% of New Zealand's electricity, and is the third largest electricity generating company in New Zealand in terms of MW capacity, GWh generation and revenue (see comparison table at New Zealand electricity market).

== History ==
Genesis Energy began business on 1 April 1999, after the reform of the New Zealand electricity market and the breakup of the Electricity Corporation of New Zealand (ECNZ). It took over the Huntly Power Station, Tongariro Power Scheme and Waikaremoana Hydro Scheme from ECNZ, and the Hau Nui Wind Farm and the Kourarau Hydro Scheme from Wairarapa Electricity. It also inherited the retail arms of Powerco, Central Power and Wairarapa Electricity, while Powerco and Central Power concentrated on electricity distribution (the distribution arm of Wairarapa Electricity merged with Powerco on the same day).

During 2000 to 2002 Genesis Energy purchased several electricity and gas retailing entities, following changes to laws governing the electricity industry. These included electricity retail businesses of Todd Energy, and electricity and gas customers from NGC (now Vector Limited) and Energy Online.

In September 2013, the company announced a change of name from Genesis Power Limited to Genesis Energy Limited.

On 17 April 2014, the National Government sold a 49% stake in Genesis Energy through an initial public offering at NZ$1.55 per share.

In February 2018, Genesis Energy announced a pathway to a coal-free electricity future for New Zealand by 2030.

In 2024, the company downgraded the reserves at Kupe by 81 petajoules of gas resulting in a $64 million writedown. This, along with other factors including a power station outage, resulted in a steep decline in profits although revenue was up.

== Power stations ==
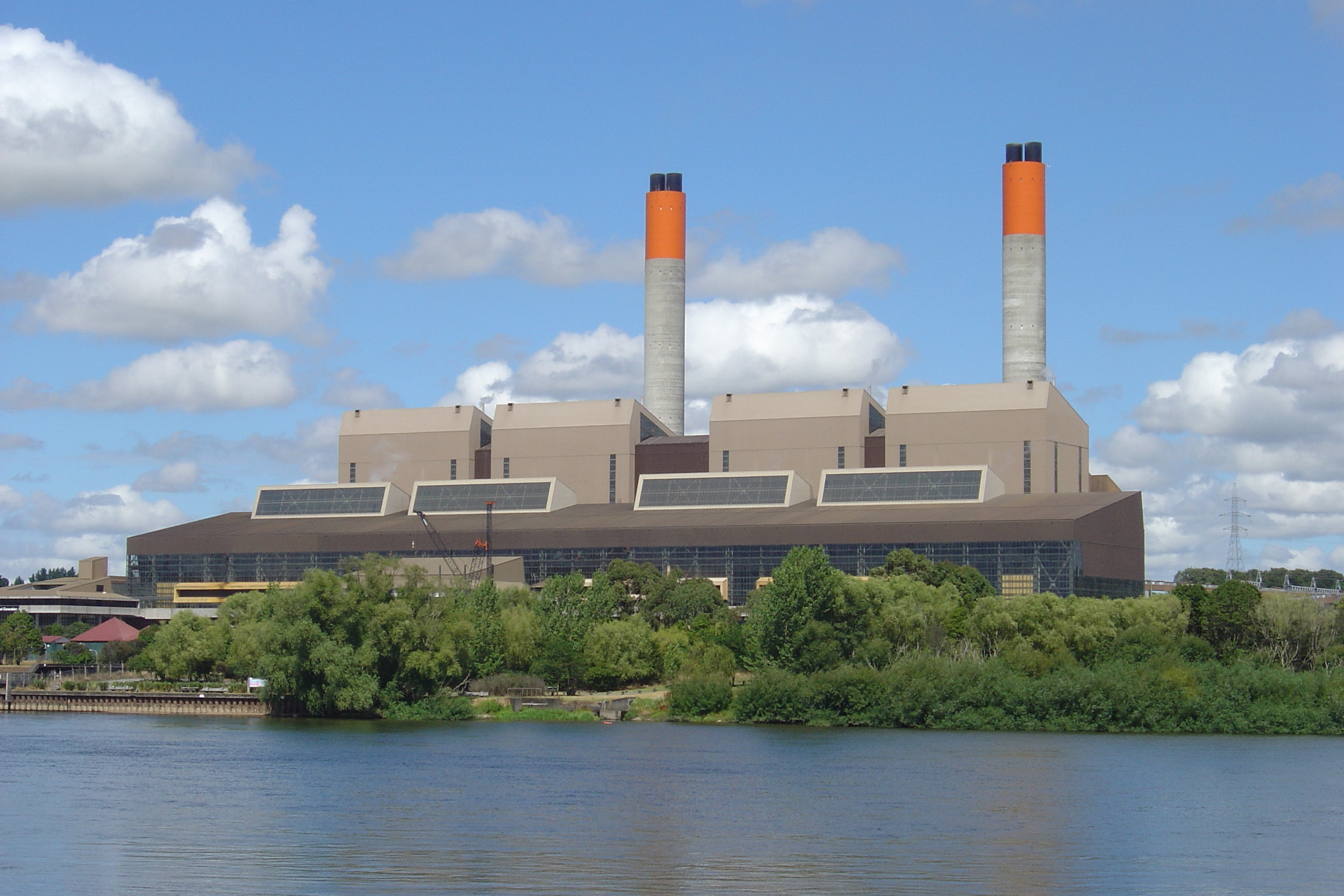
Genesis Energy owns and operates the coal- and gas-fired Huntly Power Station, New Zealand's largest power station.

Genesis Energy owns and operates a diverse portfolio of assets that includes hydroelectric, thermal and wind generation.

Genesis Energy operates three hydroelectric generating stations on the (361.8 MW) Tongariro Power Scheme – Rangipo (120 MW), Tokaanu (240 MW) and Mangaio (1.8 MW). It also operates the (138 MW) Lake Waikaremoana hydro scheme, comprising the Tuai (60 MW), Kaitawa (36 MW) and Piripaua (42 MW) stations.

On 1 June 2011, Genesis Energy purchased Tekapo A (27 MW) and B (160 MW) hydroelectric power stations from Meridian Energy.

Genesis Energy operates the Huntly Power Station, a (953 MW) coal- and gas-fired thermal plant on the Waikato River. In addition to two gas/coal-fired generating units, Huntly has a 50 MW open-cycle gas turbine unit that runs as base load, and a (403 MW) combined cycle gas turbine commissioned in June 2007 as a NZ$500 million project. Huntly also has a third coal unit, which can be taken out of storage within 90 days. The coal units are mainly used as hydro firming when New Zealand is in a dry winter.

The first of the four coal-fired units at the Huntly Power Station was taken out of service in late 2012. A second unit was placed into long-term storage in December 2013 and permanently retired in June 2015.

The company also operates the (7.3 MW) Hau Nui windfarm in the North Island.

Genesis Energy power stations
Name	Fuel, type	Location	Commissioned	Installed capacity (MW)	Annual average generation (GWh)
Hau Nui	Wind	south-east of Martinborough, Wellington	1996	7.3	22
Huntly Units (2 units)	Coal/gas, steam turbine	Huntly, Waikato	1983	500	2850
Huntly e3p (Unit 5)	Gas, combined-cycle turbine	Huntly, Waikato	2007	403	2410
Huntly P40 (Unit 6)	Gas, open-cycle turbine	Huntly, Waikato	2004	50.8	335
Kaitawa	Hydroelectric	Lake Waikaremoana, Hawke's Bay	1948	36	91
Lauriston	Solar	Lauriston, Canterbury	2025	63	47
Mangaio	Hydroelectric	south of Tūrangi, Waikato region	2008	1.8	5.8
Piripaua	Hydroelectric	Lake Waikaremoana, Hawke's Bay	1943	42	133
Rangipo	Hydroelectric	south of Tūrangi, Waikato region	1983	120	580
Tekapo A	Hydroelectric	Lake Tekapo	1955	27	160
Tekapo B	Hydroelectric	Lake Pukaki	1977	160	800
Tokaanu	Hydroelectric	Tokaanu, Waikato region	1973	240	763
Tuai	Hydroelectric	Lake Waikaremoana, Hawke's Bay	1929	60	218
Total				1647.9	8,367.8

=== Future generation developments ===
==== Castle Hill ====
Genesis Energy has resource consents for a wind farm at Castle Hill, 20 km north-east of Masterton in the northern Wairarapa. It is planning up to 286 turbines over a 30 km^{2} (12 sq mi) area, with a total installed capacity of up to 860 MW and potentially generating over 2000 GWh per year.

In March 2023 Genesis applied to extend the resource consent for the wind farm and vary its conditions. Its proposal involves reducing the size of the windfarm to 300MW. Consent was granted in October 2023, and now expires in 2031.

==== Slopedown Wind Farm ====
In 2010, Genesis Energy purchased the Southland Wind Farm aka Slopedown wind from Wind Prospect CWP Ltd. It is 15 km east of Wyndham. Genesis Energy has not yet applied for resource consents. This appears to be a Contact Energy project now as stated in Southland Wind Farm.

== Community and sustainability investments ==
=== Science Based Targets ===
Genesis has created Science Based Targets to align their sustainability goals to. They aim to reduce scope 1 and 2 emissions by 36% and reduce scope 3 emissions 21%.

=== School-gen and School-gen Trust ===
Genesis Energy began its School-gen programme in 2006 to teach students about solar power, renewable energy and energy efficiency. The School-gen programme has created extensive teaching resources, including Maker Projects and eBooks that are free for any school in New Zealand. It has also provided 92 New Zealand schools with either a 2, 4 or 6 kilowatt photovoltaic (PV) solar panel system, at no cost to the schools. The largest solar array on a School-gen school is 16 kilowatts on Vauxhall School in Auckland. The PV system allows these schools to generate a portion of their electricity from the sun while also teaching students about solar energy.

=== Duffy Books in Schools ===
Duffy Books in Homes aims to encourage reading and supports students in lower socio-economic areas where the children are more likely to come from homes without access to books.

=== Whio Forever Project ===
Genesis Energy has partnered with the New Zealand Department of Conservation to help save the endangered native whio or blue duck. The Whio Forever Project includes a national recovery plan that will double the number of fully operational secure breeding sites throughout New Zealand and boost pest control efforts.

=== Curtain Bank ===
Genesis Energy is the major sponsor of the Wellington Curtain Bank and the Christchurch Curtain Bank. The curtain banks take donated second-hand curtains or fabric and re-cut and line them for distribution to households in need. This helps households in saving money on their energy bills and to create warmer, healthier homes. Some retailers offer a service in which they take down and donate your old curtains when installing new ones.

=== Ngā Ara Creating Pathways ===
This Genesis-developed programme provides training and employment opportunities to prepare young people in local communities.

=== Pou Ltd at Huntly ===
Pou Ltd is a marae-owned entity that delivers facilities maintenance services to Huntly Power Station.

== Retail focus areas ==
- Genesis is focusing on electricity management tools for its customers including their app that has been around since 2016 - app functions include energy usage graphs, bill payments and moving home tools
- The Genesis website was updated in 2022 and focuses messaging on Energy IQ, joining and moving house through their website content

== Other developments ==
- Genesis Energy owns a 46% interest in the Kupe natural gas field.
- Genesis Energy is a founding member of Awatea, the New Zealand marine energy association.
- The Gasbridge LNG project was a 50:50 joint venture between Genesis and Contact Energy.

== Subsidiaries ==
=== Frank Energy (previously Energy Online) ===
Genesis Energy purchased Energy Online in December 2002 from the Newcall Group Limited. Energy Online was rebranded to Frank Energy in 2021. After continued growth Frank Energy now services more than 110,000 customers with a primary focus on retailing energy services to an expanding customer base in the North Island.

In June 2025, Frank Energy announced that its brand would be wound down and stopped accepting new customers. Existing customers would be moved to Genesis Energy or another retailer of their choice. The announcement came a few days after Consumer magazine gave Frank Energy their People's Choice Award (jointly with Flick Electric) for the power company with the highest customer satisfaction.

=== Infogen ===
Genesis energy retailed internet services to its customers through its Infogen service. The service was outsourced and provided by Orcon until it was purchased by Orcon in 2009.

== See also ==
- Electricity sector in New Zealand
