= Purple Pilgrims =

New Zealand musical duo

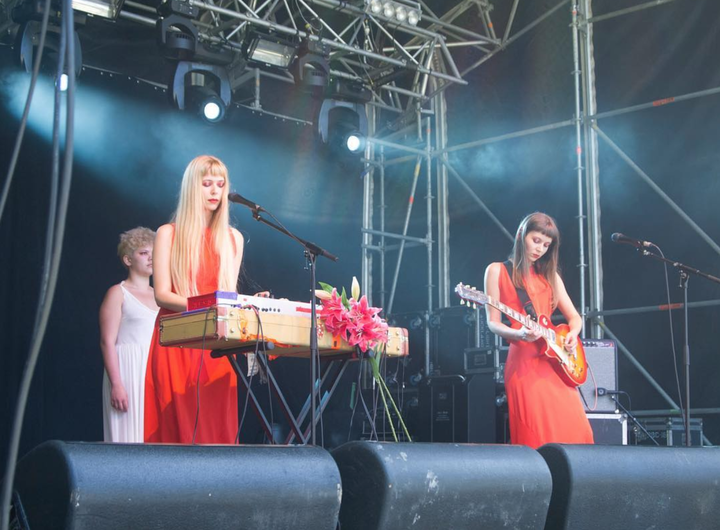
- Purple Pilgrims at Laneway Festival, 2017

Background information
- Origin: New Zealand and Hong Kong
- Genre: Dream pop
- Instruments: Vocals; guitar; synthesizer
- Years active: 2016-present
- Labels: AD 93, Flying Nun, Not Not Fun Records

Purple Pilgrims is a New Zealand dream pop duo composed of sisters Clementine and Valentine Nixon.

== Background ==
Sisters Clementine and Valentine Nixon are great-granddaughters of folk musician Davie Stewart. They were raised itinerantly between Christchurch, New Zealand and Hong Kong, China.

== Musical style ==
Purple Pilgrims' music combines elements of dream pop, noise, lo-fi, folk, and atmospheric jazz. The duo has been frequently likened to Kate Bush, Beach House and 1980s dream pop artists. Stuff has referred to the band as "Aotearoa's answer to haze-pop pioneers Dead Can Dance and Cocteau Twins".

The sisters' soprano vocal styles have been compared to Marianne Faithfull, Mary Hopkin, Joni Mitchell, Judy Collins, Sandy Denny, Vashti Bunyan and Linda Perhacs.

Purple Pilgrims utilize a mixture of digital and analog recording techniques in their work, from an early DIY approach using cassette tape collage to analog studio processing in their later work.

== Career ==
Purple Pilgrims released their first recording a self-titled 8" lathe cut record in 2011 via New Zealand underground label Pseudo Arcana. The limited edition release came with a 12-page art zine. The New Zealand Listener called the work "assertively lo-as-fi-can-go ... a good example of gently and deeply moving elegant dream pop."

In 2013 the band released a split LP with American avant-garde musician and frequent Purple Pilgrims collaborator Gary War via London-based label Upset the Rhythm.

Purple Pilgrims released their debut LP Eternal Delight in 2016 via Los Angeles based label Not Not Fun Records. The Guardian said that the album "could’ve come direct from golden era 4AD Records when the Cocteau Twins still roamed."[30].

In 2018, Purple Pilgrims collaborated with guitarist and composer Roy Montgomery on his album Suffuse, alongside Grouper, Circuit des Yeux, and Julianna Barwick. Pitchfork described the album as featuring “some of the era’s most compelling women singers.”

Purple Pilgrims' sophomore album Perfumed Earth was released on August 9, 2019, via Flying Nun Records. The Sydney Morning Herald called the album "an alluring combination of hazy soundscape and songwriting finesse…" while Pitchfork noted “...its lush melodies, strands that wind and splay like a carpet of vine”.

In 2023, Purple Pilgrims released the album The Coin That Broke The Fountain Floor, under their birth names, stylised as Clementine Valentine. Released on Flying Nun Records, the album was recorded in New York City with producer Randall Dunn (known for his work with Björk, Oneohtrix Point Never, and Jim Jarmusch), featuring renowned drummer Matt Chamberlain and mastered by Heba Kadry. The album received critical acclaim, with Rolling Stone AU naming it the #2 best New Zealand albums of 2023 and ranking it #12 among the 80 best New Zealand albums of the 2020s so far. The album artwork, painted by New Zealand artist Andrew McLeod, was nominated for Best Album Artwork at the 2024 Aotearoa Music Awards.

In 2025, Purple Pilgrims contributed backing vocals to Spring Board, the final studio album by The Chills. They appeared on three tracks: “Meet My Eyes,” “I’ll Protect You,” and “I Don’t Want to Live Forever.”

In 2026, Purple Pilgrims announced their third studio album Given To The Night, to be released on November 27, 2026 with AD 93 Recordings. Alongside the album announcement, Purple Pilgrims released the first single of the album, "Innocence Lost", on September 8, 2026.

Purple Pilgrims have headlined tours globally, and alongside Ariel Pink, Aldous Harding, Gary War, John Maus, and Weyes Blood.

== Discography ==
=== Albums ===
- Eternal Delight (Not Not Fun Records 2016)
- Perfumed Earth (Flying Nun Records 2019)
- The Coin That Broke the Fountain Floor (as Clementine Valentine) – 2023, Flying Nun Records

=== Other releases ===
- Purple Pilgrims Self-titled (8" lathe cut, Pseudo Arcana 2011)
- "Drink the Juice" (online single, Not Not Fun Records 2017)

=== Collaborations ===
- Gary War / Purple Pilgrims (Split LP, Upset the Rhythm 2013)
- Mirage by Roy Montgomery and Purple Pilgrims (Roy Montgomery 'Suffuse' LP, Grapefruit Records 2018)
