= Electricity Authority (New Zealand) =

New Zealand government entity for electricity regulation

- Te Mana Hiko (Māori)

Crown entity overview
- Formed: November 2010
- Headquarters: Level 7, 1 Willis Street, Wellington
- Minister responsible: Simeon Brown, Minister for Energy
- Crown entity executive: Sarah Gillies, Chief Executive
- Website: www.ea.govt.nz

The Electricity Authority (Māori: Te Mana Hiko) is an independent Crown entity responsible for the regulation of the New Zealand electricity market. The Authority was established in November 2010, following a government review of the electricity industry, and replaced the Electricity Commission. The Authority has a narrower focus on industry competition, reliability and efficiency than the Electricity Commission had.

== Functions and responsibilities ==
The key functions performed by the Authority are:

- Registering industry participants
- Developing and administering the Electricity Industry Participation Code
- Monitoring and enforcing compliance with the Code
- Acting as Market Administrator and contracting providers of market operations services
- Facilitating market performance through information, best-practice guidelines and related services; and
- Undertaking sector reviews

Functions that were performed by the Commission, but which are undertaken by agencies other than the Authority include:

- Consumer protection – Consumer Affairs at Ministry of Business, Innovation and Employment
- Electricity efficiency – Energy Efficiency and Conservation Authority
- Reserve energy and emergency campaigns – Transpower
- Security of supply information and forecasting – Transpower
- Transmission network upgrades approval – Commerce Commission

== Funding ==
The Electricity Authority is publicly funded, and this cost is then recovered by the government through a levy on electricity industry participants. This levy has the potential to be passed on to consumers in the form of higher electricity prices. A portion is on-charges through electricity bills (roughly 0.4% of household bills). Additionally, this levy funds electricity efficiency programmes delivered by the Energy Efficiency and Conservation Authority.

These Levy rates are rest based on the costs burdens on the Electricity Authority, and the costs of the Energy Efficiency and Conservation Authority's electricity efficiency programmes quantity of electricity generated, purchased and conveyed, plus the number of consumer connections.

== See also ==
- Electricity sector in New Zealand
