= Jucy Rentals =

Companies based in Auckland

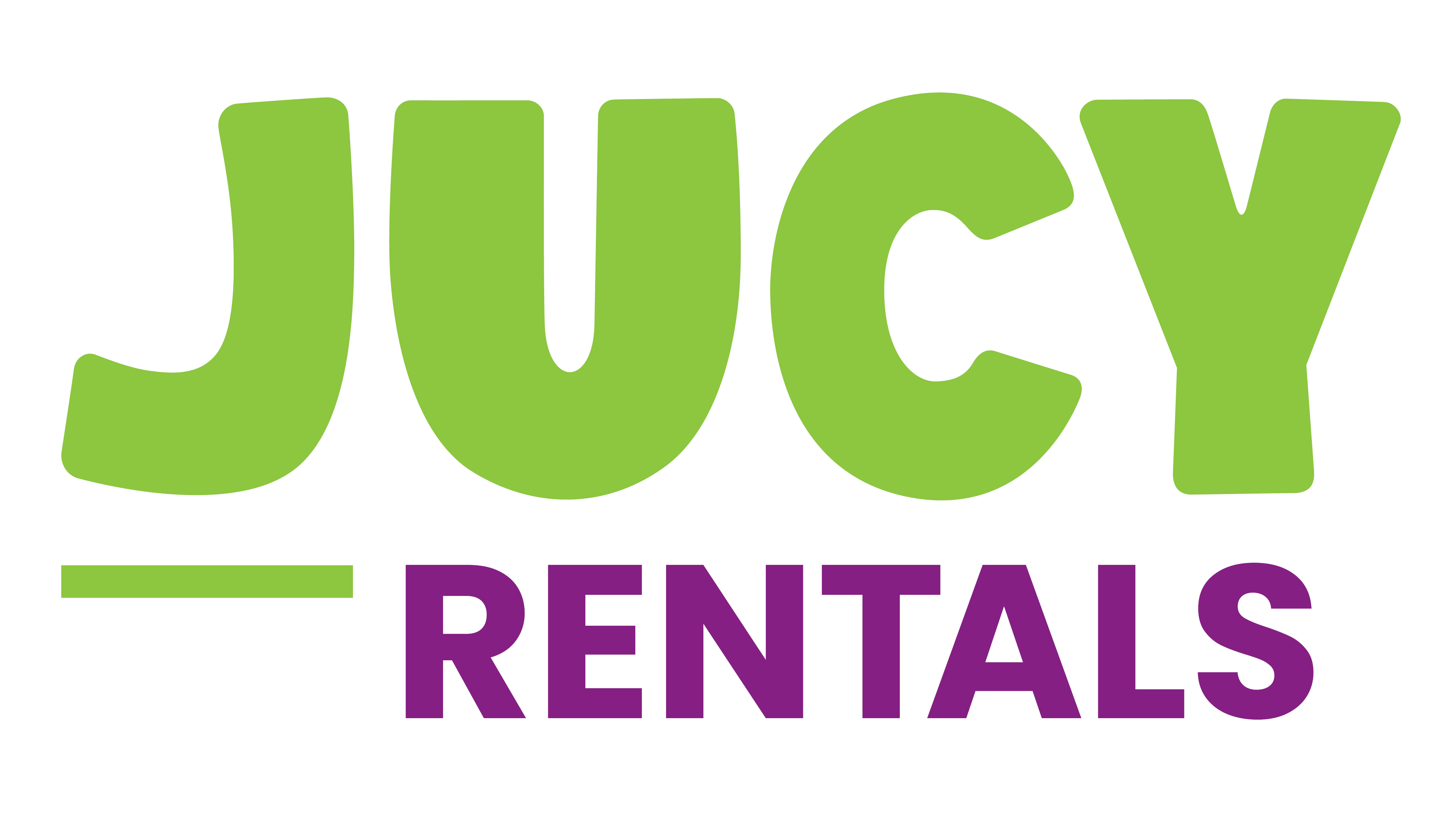

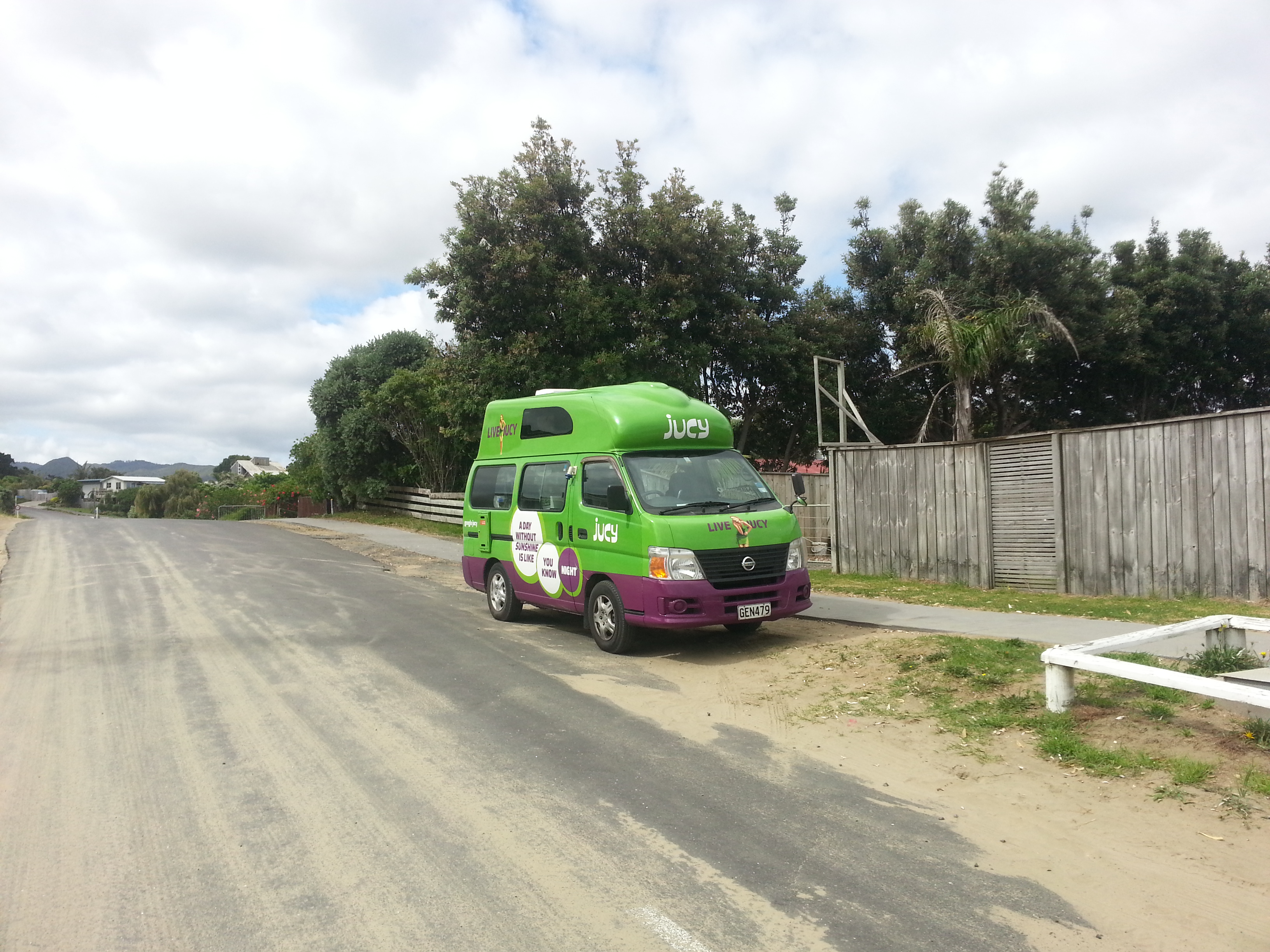
- A Jucy Camper Van at the ninety mile beach, New Zealand
- Type: Private
- Industry: Tourism
- Founded: September 2001
- Founder: Tim and Dan Alpe
- Headquarters: Auckland, New Zealand
- Key people: Tim Alpe, Dan Alpe and Chris Alpe
- Website: www.jucy.com/nz/

Jucy Rentals is a tourism company which was founded in New Zealand in 2001. Jucy is primarily a car and campervan hire business and also operates scenic cruises in Milford Sound, and Snoozes in Auckland central, Queenstown, and Christchurch.

== History ==
Jucy was founded by Auckland brothers Tim and Dan Alpe in 2001 with 35 cars. Their father, Chris Alpe, founded Maui campervans in the 1980s. The business was operated from a small garage in Parnell, Auckland, New Zealand. In 2003, JUCY launched their custom built campervans for hire in New Zealand. JUCY also built its own manufacturing plant in Auckland.

In 2008, Jucy launched a fleet of 100 JUCY compact campervans for hire in Australia. Five years later in 2013, JUCY opened operations in Australia and by 2015 had a fleet of over 500 vehicles for hire.

In 2012, Jucy opened offices in the United States, initially offering larger motorhomes for hire. In 2015, Jucy offered 200 campervans for hire in three locations across the West Coast of the United States: Los Angeles, San Francisco, & Las Vegas.

In 2016, Jucy bought a 50 percent stake in Yourdrive, a peer-to-peer car rental business in NZ.

In 2018, Jucy invested in its very first electric campervan.

== Cruise boat ==
Late in 2007, Jucy bought into Cruise Milford Sound Limited, acquiring 51% of the business which operated cruises on the Milford Adventurer boat in Milford Sound, New Zealand. The business ran as Cruize Milford until May 2011 when it was fully rebranded as JUCY Cruize, with coach services from Queenstown and Te Anau complementing the Milford Sound Cruises.

Reflecting the success achieved through the Jucy rebrand, in 2013, Jucy Cruize bought a 24m catamaran, The Maiden of Milford, from Southern Discoveries with a capacity of 200, and soon after sold the Milford Adventurer back to a new company called Cruise Milford NZ Ltd, created by a pair of the original owners of the first Cruise Milford incarnation. As part of the customer experience, Jucy Cruise joined forces with Pita Pit and offered Milford Sound's only on-board fast food restaurant.

In 2016, Jucy purchased a second cruise boat in the Milford Sound, The Gem of the Sounds. The Gem is a luxury cruise boat which set sail in 2017. New Jucy Cruise boat to take Milford Sound | Scoop News

== Accommodation ==
In 2010, Jucy Hotel opened in Auckland Central. JUCY Hotel was rebranded Jucy Snooze in 2015. A second JUCY Snooze opened in Christchurch, NZ in 2016 as a pod hotel. In April 2018 JUCY opened Queenstown Snooze with a rooftop restaurant and bar.

== Awards ==
The company was named winner of the AUT Business School Most Innovative Business Model in International Business. JUCY was nominated in two categories; ANZ Best Business and AUT Business School Most Innovative Business Model in International Business, and was named joint winner along with NZ Merino.
