= Electricity retailing =

Aspect of electric power distribution

Electricity retailing is the final sale of electricity from generation to the end-use consumer. This is the fourth major step in the electricity delivery process, which also includes generation, transmission and distribution.

== Beginnings ==
Electricity retailing began at the end of the 19th century when the bodies which generated electricity for their own use made supply available to third parties. In the beginning, electricity was primarily used for street lighting and trams. The public could buy once large scale electric companies had been started.

The provision of these services was generally the responsibility of electric companies or municipal authorities who either set up their own departments or contracted the services from private entrepreneurs. Residential, commercial and industrial use of electricity was confined, initially, to lighting but this changed dramatically with the development of electric motors, heaters and communication devices.

The basic principle of supply has not changed much over time. The amount of energy used by the domestic consumer, and thus the amount charged for, is measured through an electricity meter that is usually placed near the input of a home to provide easy access to the meter reader.

Customers are usually charged a monthly service fee and additional charges based on the electrical energy (in kWh) consumed by the household or business during the month. Commercial and industrial consumers normally have more complex pricing schemes. These require meters that measure the energy usage in time intervals (such as a half-hour) to impose charges based on both the amount of energy consumed and the maximum rate of consumption, i.e. the maximum demand. This is usually called peak demand charge. Frequent reporting also allows the retailer to pass on the spot price (with some markup) to its customers.

== Monopoly supply ==
The rapid growth in electric appliance usage in the early part of the 20th century contributed to an explosive growth in electrification around the world.

The supply of electricity to homes, offices, shops, factories, farms, and mines became the responsibility of public utilities, which were either private organizations subject to monopoly regulation or public authorities owned by local, state or national bodies.

In some countries a statutory or government-granted monopoly was created to be controlled by legislation, for example Eskom in South Africa.

Electricity retailing in the period from approximately 1890 to 1990 consisted of managing the connection, disconnection and billing of electricity consumers by the local monopoly supplier.

In many utilities there was a marketing function which encouraged electricity usage when there was excess capacity to supply and encouraged conservation when supply was tight.

== Creating a market ==
An electricity provider is often known as "the electric company" or "the power company".

In 1990 there was a significant development in the way electricity was bought and sold. In many countries, the electricity market was deregulated to open up the supply of electricity to competition. In the United Kingdom the electricity supply industry was radically reformed to establish competition, including a market in advising users about switching supplier. This trend continued in other countries (see New Zealand Electricity Market and deregulation) and the role of electricity retailing changed from what was essentially an administrative function within an integrated utility to become a risk management function within a competitive electricity market.

Electricity retailers now offer fixed prices or variable for electricity to their customers and manage the risk involved in purchasing electricity from spot markets or electricity pools. This development has not been without casualties. The most notable example of poor risk management (coupled with poor market regulation) was the 2001 California electricity crisis, when Pacific Gas and Electric and Southern California Edison were driven into bankruptcy by having to purchase electricity at high spot prices and sell at low fixed rates.

Customers may choose from a number of competing suppliers. They may also opt to purchase "green" power, i.e. electricity sourced from renewable energy generation such as wind power or solar power.

== United States ==
Over the past several decades, many US states have moved to deregulate their electric markets, with 24 states allowing for at least some competition among retail electric providers (REPs) including California, Texas, and New York. Deregulation of electric retailers has been subject to much controversy as more states have opted for competitive markets. In some cases new regulations for the industry brougnt about disruptions like the California electricity crisis.

Example of electricity tariff for operators in Texas, from May to October
View source data.
- Entergy Texas, Inc. Electric Service (Residential service -Time Of Day, Residential service, Fixed fuel factor and loss multipliers)
- El Paso electric company (Residential service rate schedule n°01)

== See also ==
- Distributed generation
- Eugene Green Energy Standard
- Net metering
- Microgeneration
- Peak demand and off-peak
- Vehicle-to-grid
- Deregulation of the Texas electricity market
