= Consumer NZ =

Consumer advice service in New Zealand

Consumer NZ is an independent, non-profit consumer advocacy organisation in New Zealand, established in 1959. It conducts independent research, uses insights from market research for investigations and tests product to inform and advocate for greater consumer protections.

It is well known for its magazine, Consumer, which is published quarterly. Consumer NZ was a finalist in the 2025 Voyager Media Awards for Best News, Current Affairs or Specialist Publication.

== History ==
The Consumers' Council was established in 1959, to protect and promote the interests of consumers. In 1963, it was renamed the Consumers' Institute and, in 1967, became a separate government-funded entity. Following the establishment of the Ministry of Consumer Affairs in 1986, the institute lost its special legal protection and government funding. In 1989, it became an incorporated society funded by member subscriptions, and in 2007, it was renamed Consumer NZ.

'Consumer NZ manages Powerswitch, which is a website that helps consumers compare power plans and check they're on the best plan to meet their needs.

== Funding ==
Consumer NZ is primarily funded by memberships. It also acquires funding through research partnerships and its business license programmes, such as the People’s Choice award and the Consumer Trusted programme.

== Research and insights ==
Consumer NZ conducts extensive research to gauge public sentiment and inform its advocacy work. The organisation's quarterly Sentiment Tracker surveys 1,000 New Zealanders to identify and monitor top consumer concerns, such as the cost of living, healthcare and climate change.

The organization also surveys New Zealanders to assess their satisfaction in areas such as insurance, banking, Kiwisaver and energy retailers.

== Campaigns and investigations ==
Consumer NZ campaigns on issues affecting people in New Zealand. Efforts focused on since 2020 include:

- Supermarkets – End dodgy ‘specials’: Consumer NZ raised concerns about inaccurate pricing and misleading promotions. In June 2022, its petition to #stopthesuperprofits saw 77,607 New Zealanders add their signature to demand fairer prices at the supermarket. In 2023, Consumer NZ filed a complaint to the New Zealand Commerce Commission, with 600 examples of pricing and promotional errors. In May 2025, the commission filed criminal charges against Woolworths NZ, Pak’nSave Silverdale and Pak’nSave Mill Street for potential breaches of the Fair Trading Act.
- Flight rights: Consumer NZ has been advocating for stronger consumer protections in the aviation sector since launching its campaign in 2022. The campaign called for airlines to communicate honestly with passengers about consumer rights and reasons for cancellations and delays. Since the campaign’s launch, Air New Zealand has updated its website and guide for passengers affected by cancellations or delays.
- Stamp out scams: In June 2024, in response to the ever-increasing threat of scams, Consumer NZ launched its campaign to stamp out scams. Its petition called for banks to refund scam victims, a national anti-scam framework and a centralised anti-scam centre where relevant organisations work together to keep New Zealanders safe.
- Yeah, Nah Awards: Launched in 2024 to highlight businesses that have significantly let consumers down, Consumer NZ's "Yeah, Nah" awards aim to pressure underperforming companies to improve their practices. Public nominations are accepted annually.

== Testing and reviews ==
Consumer NZ undertakes in-house testing and commissions independent laboratories to conduct product tests, ensuring unbiased results. It tests and rates a range of products and services, including information technology, kitchen appliances, whiteware, insurance, heating, cleaning and more.

Consumer NZ belongs to Consumers International, benefitting from the opportunity to exchange information with consumer organisations around the world.

== Board ==
Consumer NZ is governed by an elected board of seven members who serve three-year terms.

As of 2025, the board comprises:

- Robert Aitken (Chair): A professor of consumer behaviour at the University of Otago, focusing on the ethics of marketing and consumer rights.
- Kate Tokeley (Deputy Chair): An associate professor at Victoria University of Wellington's Faculty of Law, specialising in consumer law and policy.
- Elizabeth Tennet: A former Labour MP with extensive experience in consumer advocacy and governance.
- Tom Harris: With over 30 years in the social sector, Tom has extensive governance experience and a keen interest in social justice.
- Emily Mabin Sutton: General manager of Climate Club Aotearoa, with a background in technology and AI, advocating for sustainable consumer practices.
- Ron Scott: An economist and business owner with strategic planning expertise, involved in various governance roles across New Zealand.
- Jenna Whitman: Deputy chief information security officer for the Australian-based telecommunications company Vocus, with a strong focus on consumer-centric advocacy in the digital age.

== Executive team ==
Consumer NZ's' executive team provides leadership across key areas, including research, advocacy, operations, finance~~,~~ and revenue. The team supports the organisation’s mission to protect and empower consumers.

As of 2025, the executive leadership team comprises:

- Jon Duffy – Chief executive: Jon has made a career of fighting for consumers and has a keen interest in sustainability and the environmental impacts of consumption, data ethics and promoting equity.
- Gemma Rasmussen – Head of research and advocacy: Gemma is passionate about demystifying complex consumer information and driving change through advocacy to empower New Zealanders. With a background in journalism, data and communications, she is responsible for leading the organisation’s investigative, communications and advocacy work.
- Bex Robinson – Head of operations: Bex joined Consumer NZ in 2019 and leads the operations team. She is passionate about broadening Consumer’s impact and advocating for vulnerable communities across Aotearoa.
- Andrea Chew – Head of finance: Andrea has over 20 years of experience as a finance professional working for some of the world’s largest consumer brands in both the UK and New Zealand. She is passionate about driving maximum value for money in organisational spend and making finance simple to digest for non-finance professionals. Andrea is responsible for ensuring Consumer NZ's long-term financial sustainability.
- Joe Slater – Head of revenue: An executive leader in growth for impactful companies, Joe leads Consumer NZ’s revenue team, with the aim of building its member community and business services to support its research and advocacy work.
