= North Auckland and Northland grid upgrade project =

North Auckland and Northland Grid Upgrade

Location
- Country: New Zealand
- General direction: South-North
- From: Pakuranga, Auckland
- To: Albany

Ownership information
- Owner: Transpower New Zealand
- Operator: Transpower New Zealand

Construction information
- Construction started: October 2011
- Expected: December 2013

Technical information
- Type: Underground cable
- Current type: HVAC
- Total length: 37 km (23 mi)
- Capacity: 800 to 1000 MVA
- AC voltage: 220 kV
- No. of circuits: One

The North Auckland and Northland (NAaN) grid upgrade project reinforced transmission into the Auckland Region and across the harbour to North Auckland and the Northland Region. It added new 220 kV transmission capacity to the National Grid by providing 37 km of underground cable between the Pakuranga, Penrose, and Albany substations.

The project included new grid exit points at Hobson Street (Auckland CBD) and Wairau Road (North Shore) and a cable across the Auckland Harbour Bridge. The estimated total cost of the cable aspects of the works was $415 million.

The project was completed and the connection was commissioned in February 2014 at a final cost of NZ$473 million.

== Overview ==
The NAan project established a 220 kV connection between the Pakuranga and Penrose substations, and a further 220 kV connection between the Penrose and Albany substations. The Penrose to Albany section included connections to the zone substations owned by Vector at Hobson Street in the Auckland CBD, and Wairau Road in the North Shore, and established new grid exit points at both of those locations.

The 220 kV circuit from Pakuranga to Penrose:

- increased capacity to the Penrose substation by adding a third 220 kV circuit alongside the existing 220 kV Otahuhu–Penrose double-circuit line
- added to the security provided by the Whakamaru to Brownhill Road transmission line (known as the North Island Grid Upgrade or NIGU project), increasing the diversity of transmission from the south into the Auckland region by establishing a 220 kV transmission connection from Pakuranga to Penrose.

The 220 kV circuit from Penrose to Albany:

- increased capacity to the Northland region (including the North Isthmus) by adding a third 220 kV circuit to the existing 220 kV double-circuit line from Otahuhu to Henderson
- built on the NIGU project and increased the diversity for transmission from the south into the Northland region (including the North Isthmus), by establishing 220 kV transmission from Pakuranga, through Penrose, to Albany
- provided capacity and security to Vector's Hobson Street and Wairau Road substations through a 220 kV connection to the Albany–Penrose circuit, and enabled Vector to redistribute load from existing grid exit points, particularly the Albany 33 kV and 110 kV (Wairau Road) loads and Auckland CBD loads.

== Background ==
The North Auckland and Northland region covers the upper parts of the North Island, north of Henderson. It includes the North Shore and Waitakere township, the Rodney District and the entire Northland region. The main electricity load centres in the region are the North Auckland urban areas, Whangārei, and the Marsden Point Oil Refinery.

The North Auckland urban area is growing rapidly. Since the Auckland Harbour Bridge opened in 1959, the North Shore alone has expanded nearly five-fold, from a population of 50,000 in the late 1950s to 229,000 in June 2011. The after diversity maximum demand (ADMD) for electricity in the North Auckland and Northland region is forecast to grow from 908 megawatts in 2012 to 1254 megawatts by 2027. This is an average annual growth rate of 2.2 percent, which is higher than the national average of 1.7 percent per annum.

There are no large generating stations operating in the region, although there are local generation schemes with a combined total output of around 54 megawatts. Two large generating stations were built in Northland in the late 1960s and early 1970s – the 250 MW Marsden A and Marsden B oil-fired thermal power stations at Marsden point . However, the 1973 oil crisis, the 1979 energy crisis, and the discovery of Maui gas saw Marsden B mothballed before it was commissioned. Marsden A was relegated to a reserve generator during drought years before being decommissioned in 1997. Plans were developed in 2004 to refurbish and modify the Marsden B station to become a 300 MW coal-fired power station, but these were subsequently scrapped in 2007 after widespread protest. Because of the lack of generation in the North Auckland and Northland region, nearly all of the electricity used in the area must be supplied via transmission lines that run through Auckland, carrying electricity from Otahuhu, and generators in the Waikato region.

Prior to the commissioning of the NAaN project, the main route for electricity transmission into the North Auckland and Northland region was through the double-circuit 220 kV Henderson to Otahuhu via Southdown line. This is a high capacity line, rated to operate at 938/984 MVA (summer/winter) per circuit in normal circumstances and slightly higher during contingencies, but restricted to 915 MVA due to constraints at Henderson substation. There were also two double circuit 110 kV lines that run parallel to the 220 kV line via Hepburn Road (Glendene) and Mount Roskill, with one line going via Māngere. However, these lines are of relatively low capacity and on their own could support only a very small proportion of the total load north of Mount Roskill.

Therefore, the Henderson-Otahuhu double circuit 220 kV line represented a single mode of failure for the supply of electricity to the entire North Auckland and Northland region. A study of the High Impact, Low Probability (HILP) risks associated with the Henderson to Otahuhu 220 kV transmission line was included as one of the submissions made by Transpower to the Electricity Commission in early 2009, in support of the need for the NAan project. The line was also fast approaching capacity with the load growth, with some circuits expected to overload from 2017 during certain outages.

The vulnerability of the transmission line was subsequently shown on 30 October 2009 at around 8:00am, when power was cut to the whole of Northland and most of the northern half of Auckland, affecting 280,000 consumers (14.5% of the country). A forklift carrying a shipping container accidentally hit one of the Henderson to Otahuhu circuits while the other circuit was out for maintenance, leaving the region supplied by the four low capacity 110 kV circuits. Power was restored to the entire region around 11:00am.

== Project timeline ==
Key milestones in the history of the project are:

- 2005 – Cable ducts installed alongside the route of the Northern Motorway, during the construction of the Northern Busway, between the Auckland Harbour Bridge and Constellation Drive.
- 21 September 2007 – Transpower submitted a Grid Upgrade Plan proposal to the Electricity Commission, following a period of consultation with stakeholders. The estimated cost of the project at that time was $521 million.
- 9 November 2007 – Vector made a submission to the Electricity Commission supporting the main NAan proposal.
- 9 May 2008 – Transpower submitted revised versions of the NAaN proposals to the Commission, seeking approval for $577 million for the main proposal.
- May 2008 – the Commission gave designated transmission customers and parties affected by the revised proposals an opportunity to comment.
- 19 December 2008 – the Commission published a notice of its intention to decline Transpower's NAaN proposal, and gave further opportunities for affected parties to comment
- 23 December 2009 – the Commission received requests from Transpower and Vector for a public conference to provide a final opportunity for comment on the proposed investment.
- 13 February 2009 – the Commission held a technical briefing in Auckland and called for submissions.
- 2 March 2009 – a public conference was held
- 30 April 2009 – the Commission decided to approve NAaN proposal, and published a final decision, following consideration of additional material made available at the public conference.
- 15 June 2010 – Vector and Transpower sign security of supply agreement for access to the Vector tunnel between Penrose and Hobson Street.
- 31 May 2011 – Tunnel access agreement between Transpower and Vector becomes unconditional.
- 30 March 2012 – First section of cable installed in the Northern Busway

== The route ==
=== Pakuranga to Penrose ===
The 9 km long route of the underground cables between Pakuranga and Penrose is mainly in the road carriageway of Ti Rakau Drive and the South Eastern Highway. For the final section approaching Penrose, the route is adjacent to existing overhead transmission lines in a designated transmission corridor. Where the cables cross the Tamaki River and Pakuranga Creek they are attached to the relevant road bridge. The original Pakuranga-Penrose A 110 kV overhead transmission line is removed.

=== Penrose to Hobson Street ===
Between Penrose and Hobson Street, the NAan project cables are installed in Vector's 9 km long tunnel from Penrose to Hobson St. The tunnel is about 3 m in diameter and was completed in 2001 to secure electricity supply into central Auckland, especially after the 1998 Auckland power crisis. The tunnel follows the Auckland Southern Motorway between Penrose and the Symonds Street interchange, where the tunnel passes through central city streets, via Vector's Liverpool Street zone substation, to the Hobson Street substation.

At Hobson Street, a new grid exit point with a single 250 MVA 220/110 kV was to be established, connecting to Vector's Hobson Street zone substation and supplying Vector's central city distribution network.

Vector had two existing 110 kV cables paralleling the Transpower cable, connecting Penrose and Hobson Street via Liverpool Street, which continue to provide extra capacity and redundancy.

=== Hobson Street to Albany ===
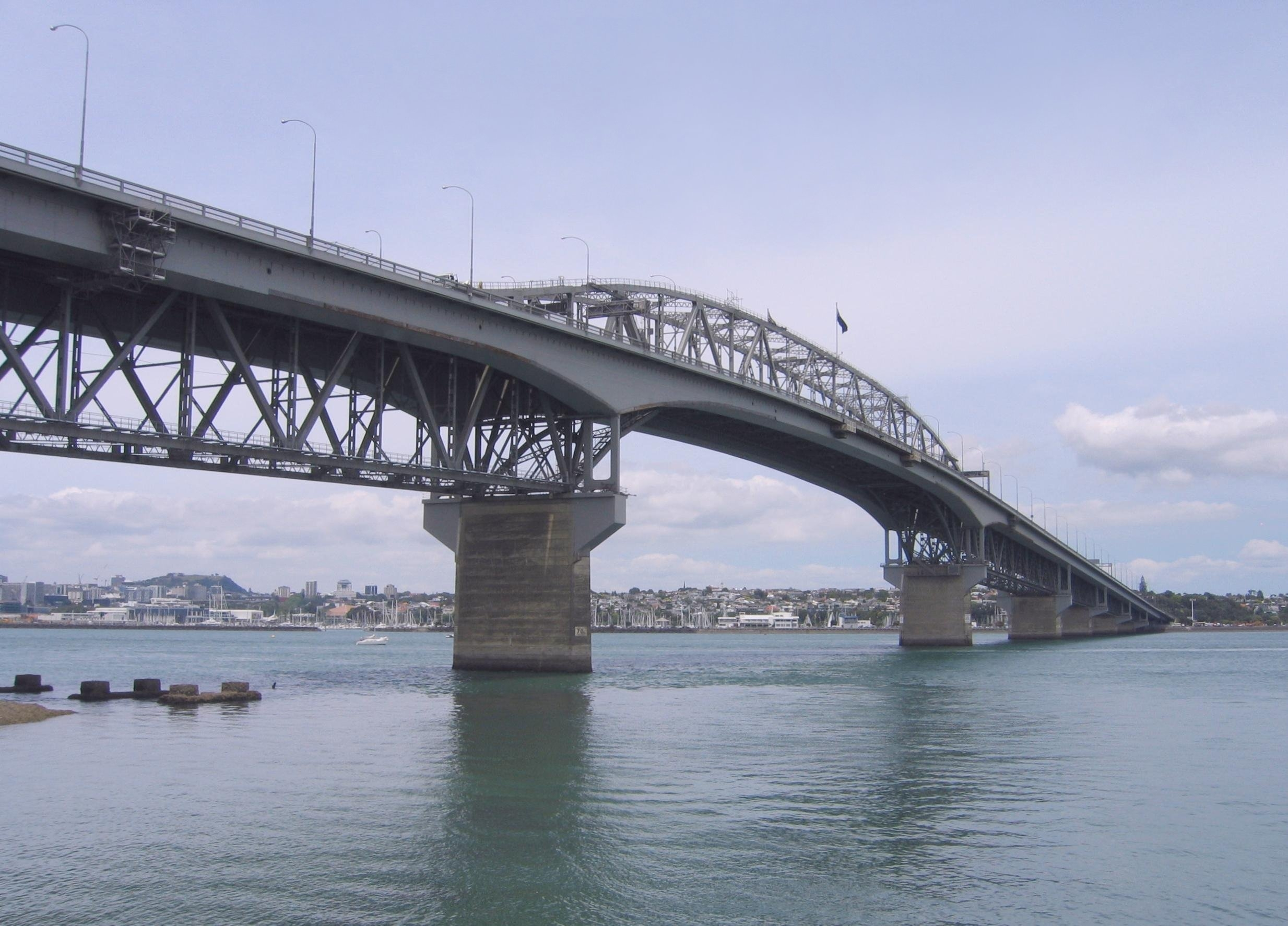
Auckland Harbour Bridge

From the Hobson Street substation, the NAan cables are installed in ducts along a route through Fanshawe Street and Westhaven to the Auckland Harbour Bridge. The route across the bridge is on a purpose built cable support structure.

From the Harbour Bridge the route follows the Northern Busway. The cables are installed in ducts that were originally placed during the construction of the busway in 2005. Cable joint bays are installed at 500–800 m intervals. The cables are deviated from the Northern Busway at Wairau Road to connect to a new grid exit point (Wairau Road) adjacent to Vector's Wairau Valley zone substation, containing a single 120 MVA 220/33 kV connecting into the Wairau Valley zone substation and supplying the southern North Shore. Vector's work at this site includes the conversion of the existing outdoor 33 kV switchyard into an indoor switchroom. From Wairau Road, the cable route again follows the Northern Busway to Constellation Drive.

The NAaN cables leave the Northern Motorway at Constellation Drive, and are installed in trenches and ducts beneath roads in Albany to Transpower's Albany Substation. Vector has three existing 110 kV overhead line circuits connecting Albany to Wairau Valley to provide redundancy on this section.

=== Sites ===
- Pakuranga sub-station: 36.9261°S 174.9063°E
- Penrose sub-station: 36.9055°S 174.8177°E
- Hobson Street sub-station: 36.8454°S 174.7623°E
- Wairau Road sub-station: 36.7805°S 174.7469°E
- Albany sub-station: 36.7395°S 174.6907°E

== Cable ratings ==
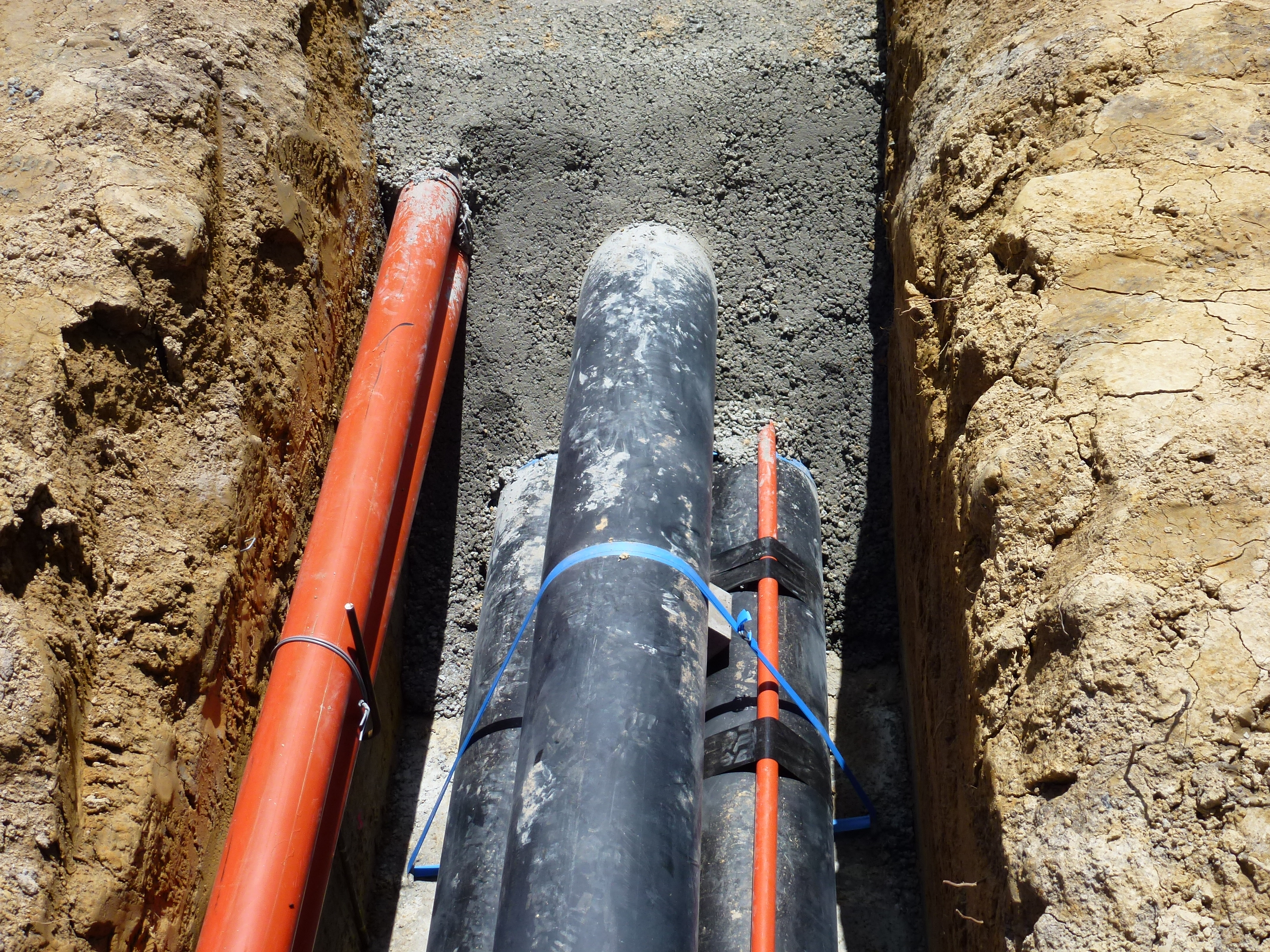
220 kV cable ducts in trefoil configuration

The cables are copper conductor, cross linked polyethylene (XLPE) insulated, metal sheathed cables with high density polyethylene over-sheaths. They are about 160 mm in diameter and weigh about 40 kg a metre. Each section of the route is a single circuit, with three separate cables – one for each phase. In the trenched sections of the route, the cables are typically installed in ducts in trefoil configuration.

The ratings of the four cable sections vary slightly, as shown in the following table.

Ratings of cable sections
	Rating
Pakuranga to Penrose	900 MVA
Penrose to Hobson Street	1000 MVA
Hobson Street to Wairau Road	800 MVA
Wairau Road to Albany	800 MVA

== See also ==
- High-voltage cable
- National Grid (New Zealand)
- Electricity sector in New Zealand
- Electric power transmission
