= 2006 Auckland blackout =

Power outage in Auckland, New Zealand

The 2006 Auckland Blackout was a major electrical blackout in Auckland, the largest city in New Zealand, on 12 June 2006. It started at 08:30 local time, with most areas of Auckland regaining power by 14:45. It affected some 230,000 customers and at least 700,000 people in and around the city.

== Immediate effect ==
Power went off at around 8:30 am local time on 12 June 2006 over half of Auckland in New Zealand. Most of southern and central Auckland, including the central city were without power.

== Cause ==
The cause of the blackout was traced back to the Ōtāhuhu sub-station, the city's main transmission switching station. A corroded shackle connecting the Ōtāhuhu to Penrose 220 kV line's earth wire had broken in 90 km/h (56 mph) winds, letting the earth wire fall across the 220 kV line and the 110 kV busbar below it, tripping both the line and three sections of the busbar, disconnecting lines to Mount Roskill, Penrose and Pakuranga. The trip also disconnected Ōtāhuhu B and Southdown power stations from the national grid. The trip left only one line, the now-dismantled Arapuni to Pakuranga 110 kV line, supplying Pakuranga, Penrose, and the central city. Eight seconds after the failure, this line tripped from overloading, leaving Penrose, Pakuranga, and central city substations without power, as well as parts of Ōtāhuhu and Mount Roskill substations.

Investigation of this incident found that maintenance of the electricity transmission system was not adequate and that this substation had major and minor design deficiencies.

== Effects ==
Due to the power outage, many public services and business operations were disrupted:

- suburban commuter railway services were suspended
- over 300 groups of traffic lights were off
- some hospitals were closed and left only emergency services in operations
- radio station transmitters located in the Sky Tower were also taken offline for a period of time
- mobile phone and telephone service failures
- people stuck in lifts in office buildings
- end of semester exams due to be held that day at local universities were postponed.

Since the central city was without power from the morning rush hours, business operations and traffic were disrupted severely. Many businesses sent their staff home.

== Restoration of service ==
Power was restored to Auckland central at 12:40 local time, 12 June 2006. It was estimated that all affected areas would have their power restored by 16:30 local time. At approximately 14:45, power was restored to most of Auckland, except Penrose, Glen Innes, East Tāmaki, and Ōtāhuhu.

== Improving security of supply ==
The incident at Ōtāhuhu in June 2006 had a major influence on subsequent decisions about the development of the grid.

On 11 December 2006, the Electricity Commission received an application from Transpower for the establishment of a new 220 kV gas insulated switchgear (GIS) facility at Ōtāhuhu, adjacent to but geographically separate from the existing outdoor 220 kV switchyard. This project was described as the Ōtāhuhu substation diversity project, and included transferring approximately half of the circuits from the existing switchyard to the new GIS switchyard, to improve network resilience. The project was approved in August 2007.

Further steps have been taken to increase security of supply to Auckland, by reducing the dependence on Ōtāhuhu. These include the diversity provided as part of the North Island Grid Upgrade Project by connecting the new Whakamaru to Brownhill Road transmission line to Pakuranga substation, rather than directly to Ōtāhuhu. A second major project, the North Auckland and Northland grid upgrade project provides underground 220 kV cables from Pakuranga to Penrose, and from Penrose to Albany on the North Shore, via Hobson Street in the Auckland CBD. A 220 kV- capable overhead transmission line between Pakuranga and Ōtāhuhu has also been upgraded from 110 kV to 220 kV.

== See also ==
- 1998 Auckland power crisis
- List of power outages
- Whakamaru to Brownhill Road transmission line
- North Auckland and Northland grid upgrade project
