= Union Rotorua =

History
- Name: Union Rotorua
- Owner: Union SSCo 1977–98
- Port of registry: New Zealand
- Route: Trans Tasman
- Builder: BHP, Whyalla Steelworks
- Cost: $30 million
- Yard number: 60
- Launched: 19 January 1976
- Completed: 1976
- Identification: IMO number: 7366221
- Fate: Broken up Alang, India 1999

General characteristics
- Type: Container and Ro-Ro
- Tonnage: 23,971 GRT
- Length: 203.2m LOA
- Beam: 26.3m
- Propulsion: 1 × General Electric MM5262RB gas turbine
- Speed: 19 knots

Union Rotorua was a large ro-ro vessel operated on the trans Tasman route by the Union Steam Ship Company of New Zealand (USSCo). Along with her sister ship Union Rotoiti, she was unusual in that she originally had turbo-electric transmission.

== Construction ==
Union Rotorua was built by BHP's Whyalla Steelworks in South Australia. She was launched on 19 January 1976. Delivery was delayed by a year and costs went over-budget by $8 million bringing the total cost to $30 million. It was subsequently acknowledged that Rotoiti and her sister ship Rotorua could have been built for half the price if they had been built outside Australia.

Union Rotorua was unusual in that she was powered by gas turbine. The ship's main gas turbine / electric machinery consisted of a single General Electric MM5262RB gas turbine operating on a regenerative cycle. This was coupled to an AC generator to provide a maximum designed continuous rating of 18822 kW for a motor propeller speed of 200rpm. The turbine speed of 4670rpm was reduced to 1500rpm for the generator by a reduction gearbox. The generator output 6.6kV 3-phase at 50 Hz to the ships motors. There were four closed air circuit water cooled synchronous A.C. motors, arranged with two per shaft. Previous USSCo vessels had traditionally had twin outward turning fixed pitch propellers, however Union Rotorua has twin inward turning controllable pitch propellers. This decision was made in the interests of maneuverability, since the center of thrust is in the outer part of the disk thus giving a larger turning moment arm. In normal running configuration the whole system could be controlled by a single lever from the bridge. The speed of the gas turbine was controlled by a solid state control and safety system integrated with the propulsion controls.

Union Rotorua was also interesting in its use of ro-ro for the Trans Tasman route. The cargo did not necessarily just contain truck and trailer units, but was also cargo stacked in the decks using forklifts. This necessitated the vehicle decks of the ship being built to withstand the loading of up to 39t per axle that could be exerted by a heavy forklift. Union Rotorua was built with a large angled stern ramp that allowed her to unload her cargo at any wharf without the need for a specialist linkspan as required by most ro-ro ships. She also had a bow door which could be used if a linkspan was present in a port, thus allowing cargo to be worked both forward and aft speeding up turn around time.

== Incidents ==
In May 1980 Union Rotorua was on passage from Tauranga to Sydney when she broke down 200 miles west of Cape Maria van Diemen. Union Rotoiti was only 80 miles away and the two masters agreed to attempt a tow. Captain Andrew Keyworth, one of the most senior masters of the USSCo, was the master of Union Rotoiti. With much skill on his part, and while the ships were sometimes only 25 metres apart, a line was made fast between the two ships by use of a line-carrying rocket. Once the tow began 422 nm were covered in just over 56 hours at an average speed of 7.5 knots. It was a feat never before accomplished with two ships of this size, and Captain John Warren of Union Rotorua later exclaimed: ‘If anyone had previously tried to tell me it was possible … I would have thought them quite barmy’.

On 29 December 1993 Union Rotorua was about 27 miles south of Sydney Heads, en route for Melbourne, when a fire broke out in the gas turbine house. It was established that the seat of the fire was in one of the cubicles of the 6.6 kilovolt switchboard, which distributed power from the gas turbine generator to the propulsion motors and auxiliary electrical systems. Initial attempts to fight the fire with extinguishers proved to be ineffective and a decision was made to utilise the fixed fire fighting medium and flood the space with CO_{2}. This was effective in extinguishing the fire. With the high voltage switchboard out of commission, the vessel was towed to Sydney, where it remained for three months undergoing repairs.

During the 1998 Auckland power crisis the four underground cables providing power to downtown Auckland all failed between 20 January and 20 February, leaving much of the downtown area without power for five weeks. Generators were brought in from across the country, however this was still not enough to power Auckland. In the first week of March Union Rotorua was brought in to supply power to parts of downtown Auckland. Berthed at Freyberg Wharf she was connected up so that her gas turbine and A.C. generator could supply power to one of the cities largest users, Ports of Auckland Ltd. This allowed the container cranes to continue to work at full speed during the outage.

== See also ==
- video (no sound) of Union Rotorua being launched
