= Whakamaru Dam =

Whakamaru Power Station
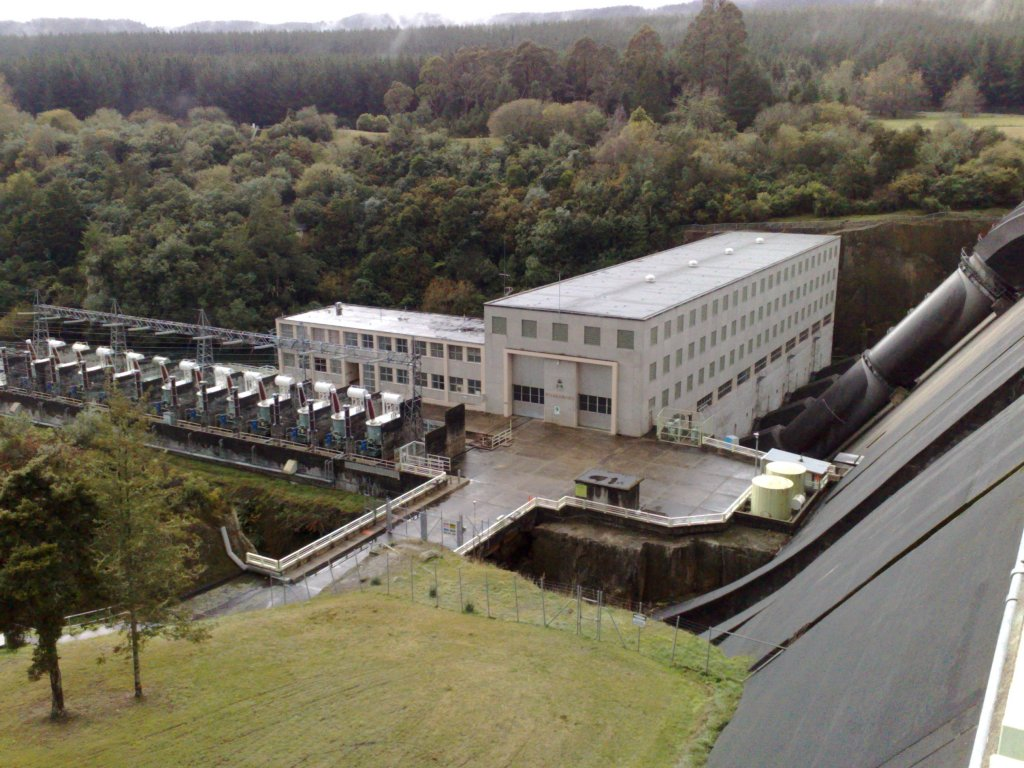

- Location within New Zealand
- Country: New Zealand
- Location: Lake Whakamaru
- Coordinates: 38°25′11″S 175°48′30″E
- Status: Operational
- Opening date: 1949
- Owner: Mercury Energy

Dam and spillways
- Impounds: Waikato River

Power Station
- Turbines: 4
- Installed capacity: 124 MW

Whakamaru Power Station is a hydroelectric power station on the Waikato River, adjacent to the town of Whakamaru in the North Island of New Zealand. It is the fourth hydroelectric power station on the Waikato River.

Lake Whakamaru is one of the larger hydro reservoirs on the Waikato river. The power station is owned and operated by Mercury Energy. The adjacent Whakamaru switching station is operated by Transpower and is a key node on the national grid.

== History ==
Development work started in 1949 with the construction on 10 kilometres (6.2 mi) of road from Mangakino which at the time was the operational centre of the Waikato hydroelectric scheme. Firstly a diversion channel 259 metres (850 ft) long, 31 metres (102 ft) deep and 7 metres (23 ft) wide was built taking 3 years to complete.

The foundation rock turned out to be deeply cracked and filled with clays rendering it partially porous. Shafts were sunk into the rock and this allowed the clay to be cleared and cement grout was later forced into the rock which was then back-filled with concrete.

== Transmission ==
The first 220 kV transmission lines in New Zealand were constructed from Maraetai to Whakamaru, and from Whakamaru to Ōtāhuhu. These lines were commissioned in October 1952, making Whakamaru a key node on the North Island grid. Following the commissioning of the HVDC Inter-Island link, the North Island Control Centre for the national grid was transferred from Claudelands to a new facility at Whakamaru, officially opened on 13 January 1965. The North Island Control Centre at Whakamaru remained in service until 1993 when a replacement was commissioned at Hamilton.

Electricity generated by Whakamaru and the other five Waikato hydroelectric power stations, and the geothermal power stations in the area, converges at the Whakamaru substation on the western side of the dam. It is transmitted from there via 220 kV lines to the Bay of Plenty, Hawke's Bay, Manawatu and Hamilton. The largest transmission route is to New Zealand's largest city, Auckland, approximately 200 kilometres (120 mi) to the north – three 220 kV circuits connect Whakamaru to Otahuhu in southern Auckland, with an additional circuit serving Otahuhu via Hamilton.

In 2010–2012 the Whakamaru to Brownhill Road transmission line, a major line, was constructed to Brownhill Road, close to the south Auckland urban boundary. This reinforced supply lines to Auckland and allowed for the large amount of new geothermal generation that was expected in the Taupo region over the following 5–7 years. A separate switching station, designated Whakamaru North, was built approximately 800 metres (2,600 ft) from the current substation as the terminal station for the new line, with short tie-lines connecting to the existing substation.

== Refurbishment ==
In 2013 a refurbishment project was begun to refurbish the turbines and generators. The first equipment arrived at site in 2016 and was installed and commissioned on the first unit in 2017. The generator replacement parts were supplied by GE Renewables. The new turbine components were supplied by Andritz Hydro. By 2020, all units had been refurbished and the total generation capacity increased from 100 MW to 124 MW.
