= National Grid (New Zealand) =

Overview of the electrical grid in New Zealand

New Zealand's major transmission network. Generation and load centres are shown as blue and red circles respectively. The major AC transmission corridors are shown as black lines, with the HVDC Inter-Island as a dashed line.

The National Grid is the nationwide system of electric power transmission in New Zealand. The grid is owned, operated and maintained by Transpower New Zealand, a state-owned enterprise, although some lines are owned by local distribution companies and leased to Transpower. In total, the national grid contains 11,803 kilometres (7,334 mi) of high-voltage lines and 178 substations.

Much of New Zealand’s electricity generation is hydroelectric, the majority of which is from power stations on lakes and rivers in the lower half of the South Island, while most of the electricity demand is in the North Island, in particular, the Auckland region. Consequently, large amounts of electricity need to be transmitted long distances from power stations to electricity users, including transmission across Cook Strait through the HVDC Inter-Island link.

Investments in new transmission are regulated by the Electricity Commission and the Commerce Commission. In a news release in January 2012, the Commerce Commission reported that Transpower was planning to invest $5 billion over the next 10 years in upgrades of critical infrastructure.

== History ==
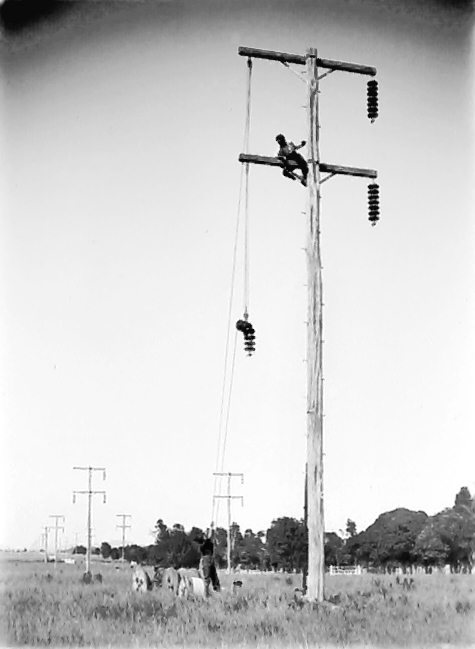
Construction of the 110kV transmission lines between Mangahao Power Station to Khandallah substation in Wellington, 1925.

Initial use of electricity in New Zealand was associated with mining. The first industrial hydro-electric power plant was established at Bullendale in Otago in 1885, to provide power for a 20 stamp battery at the Phoenix mine. The plant used water from the nearby Skippers Creek, a tributary of the Shotover River. There was a two-mile-long (3.2 km) transmission line from the generating station to the stamping battery.

The first transmission line constructed by the government was associated with the Okere Falls Power Station near Rotorua. Electricity was transmitted at 3.3 kV over a 13-mile (21 km) route to Rotorua, and was used to drive sewage pumps, and some public buildings including five thermal baths.

The first major transmission line in the North Island was constructed in 1913-14, connecting the Horahora hydro station to Waikino to meet the power requirements of the stamp battery 5 miles (8.0 km) further on at the Waihi gold mine. The line length between Horahora and Waikino was 45 miles (72 km), and the transmission voltage was 50 kV, which was to set a precedent for North Island transmission voltage for many years.

The first major transmission line in the South Island was constructed by the government as part of the Coleridge hydro station development and was commissioned in 1914. Two transmission lines operating at 66 kV carried the power from Coleridge over a distance of 65 miles (105 km) to Addington in Christchurch.

Following World War I, regional networks began to develop using 110 kV transmission lines to connect towns and cities with remote hydroelectric schemes. By 1930, there were three major transmission networks: the Arapuni system stretched from the Hibiscus Coast in the north to Ōtorohanga and Rotorua in the south and Ōpōtiki in the east; the Mangahao-Waikaremoana system stretched from Wellington north to Gisborne and west to Wanganui; and the Coleridge system stretched along coastal Canterbury from Rangiora to Oamaru. During the Depression years, the Arapuni and Mangahao-Waikaremoana systems were connected via Taranaki and the system extended north to Whangārei. The Coleridge system extended south to link with Dunedin's Waipori system and Southland's Monowai system, inland from Oamaru to the Waitaki Dam, and west over Arthur's Pass to Greymouth.

The State Hydro-electric Department was established in 1946 to oversee the development of electricity generation and transmission to meet rapidly growing demand. Nelson and Marlborough were the last regions to join the national grid system when a transmission line between Inangahua and Stoke was completed in 1956.

The construction of the 220 kV network began in the early 1950s, initially connecting Auckland and Wellington to the Waikato River dams, and Christchurch to Roxburgh Dam. The first North Island 220 kV line was commissioned between Maraetai and Whakamaru in October 1952, and the first South Island 220 kV line was commissioned between Roxburgh and Islington in July 1956.

In 1958 the State Hydro-electric Department was changed into the NZ Electricity Department (NZED), reflecting the development of thermal generation to supplement the hydro-electric schemes.

The electricity systems of the two islands were joined together by the HVDC Inter-Island link in 1965, connecting Benmore in the South Island with the suburb of Haywards in the North Island. The original link used mercury arc valve converters and was rated at 600 MW. It was the first HVDC link to be commissioned in the Southern Hemisphere.

In 1978, the Electricity Division of the Ministry of Energy was established to integrate the state-owned electricity generation and transmission business with the oil, gas and coal businesses of the government owned energy sector.

In 1987, the Electricity Corporation of New Zealand (ECNZ) was established as a State Owned Enterprise, and in 1988, the transmission business was established as a subsidiary within ECNZ, taking the name Transpower New Zealand.

The late 1980s and early 1990s saw the completion of the 220 kV backbone, with the last line connecting Stratford in Taranaki to Huntly in Waikato. The HVDC Inter-Island was also upgraded by increasing the operating voltage of the lines, replacing the original Cook Strait submarine cables and installing a new thyristor pole in parallel to the existing mercury arc valve converter equipment to double its capacity to 1240 MW.

In 1994, Transpower was separated from Electricity Corporation of New Zealand to become a State-Owned Enterprise in its own right.

=== The "Glide Path" ===
In 1997, Transpower adopted a strategy known internally as “the glide path”, and minimised spending on the grid and renewing assets. The rationale for this strategy was based on the expectation that there would be widespread installation of distributed generation (electricity generated close to where it is used), and that this would significantly reduce the need to expand and renew the grid.

However, by 2003, it had become clear that the glide path strategy was unsustainable. Many of the grid assets were approaching the end of their useful life, and at the same time had to carry higher loads than previously experienced to meet the demands of a growing economy and population. Transpower identified that the grid backbone was nearing its capacity and that investment was needed in many other parts of the grid. The transmission lines into and around Auckland were of particular concern, having remained largely unmodified since the late 1970s while the city's population has doubled. The aging and near-capacity infrastructure has caused several high profile failures, including the 1998 Auckland power crisis, where aging cables caused a cascading failure and blacking out the CBD for five weeks (strictly speaking, this was a distribution system failure, not a transmission failure); the 2006 Auckland Blackout, where a corroded shackle broke and caused a seven-hour outage of the inner city, and an October 2009 incident where a forklift accidentally knocked out power to northern Auckland and the whole of Northland.

=== Major grid developments commence ===
In 2008, Transpower turned its attention to the need for replacement and refurbishment of the aging grid assets.

A new strategy was developed that focussed on advancing investment proposals to increase the capacity of the grid. Some of the main grid upgrade projects are described in the following section.

== AC transmission network ==
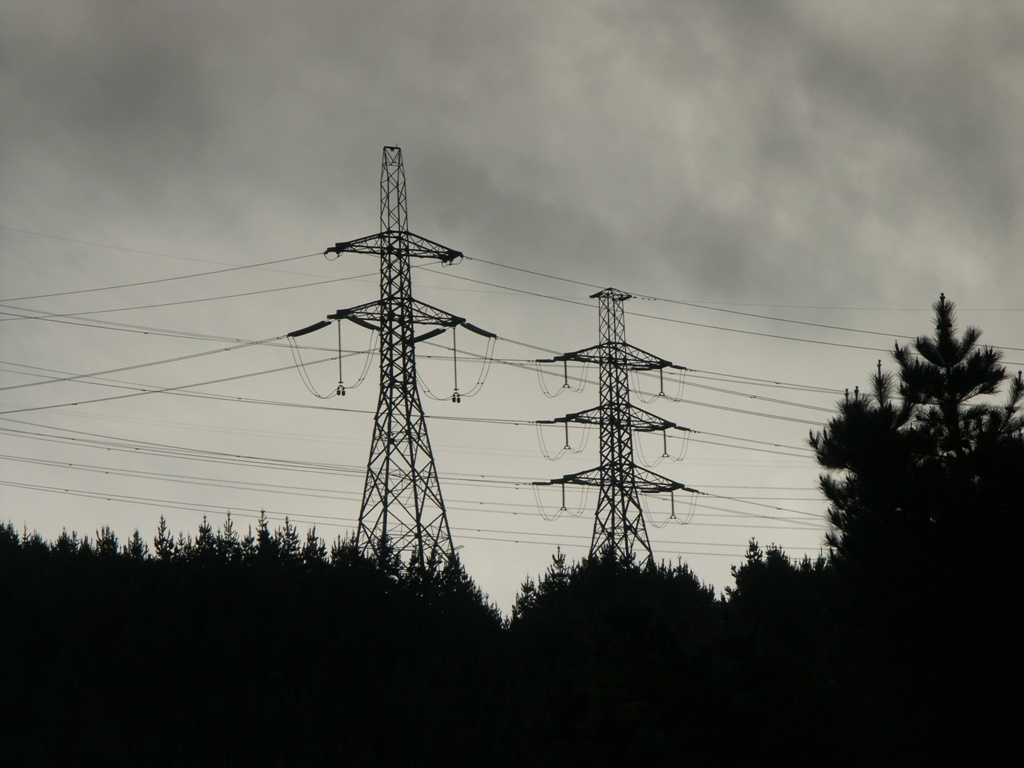
A 220kV transmission line (back) and the HVDC Inter-Island transmission line (front) near the Cook Strait in Wellington.

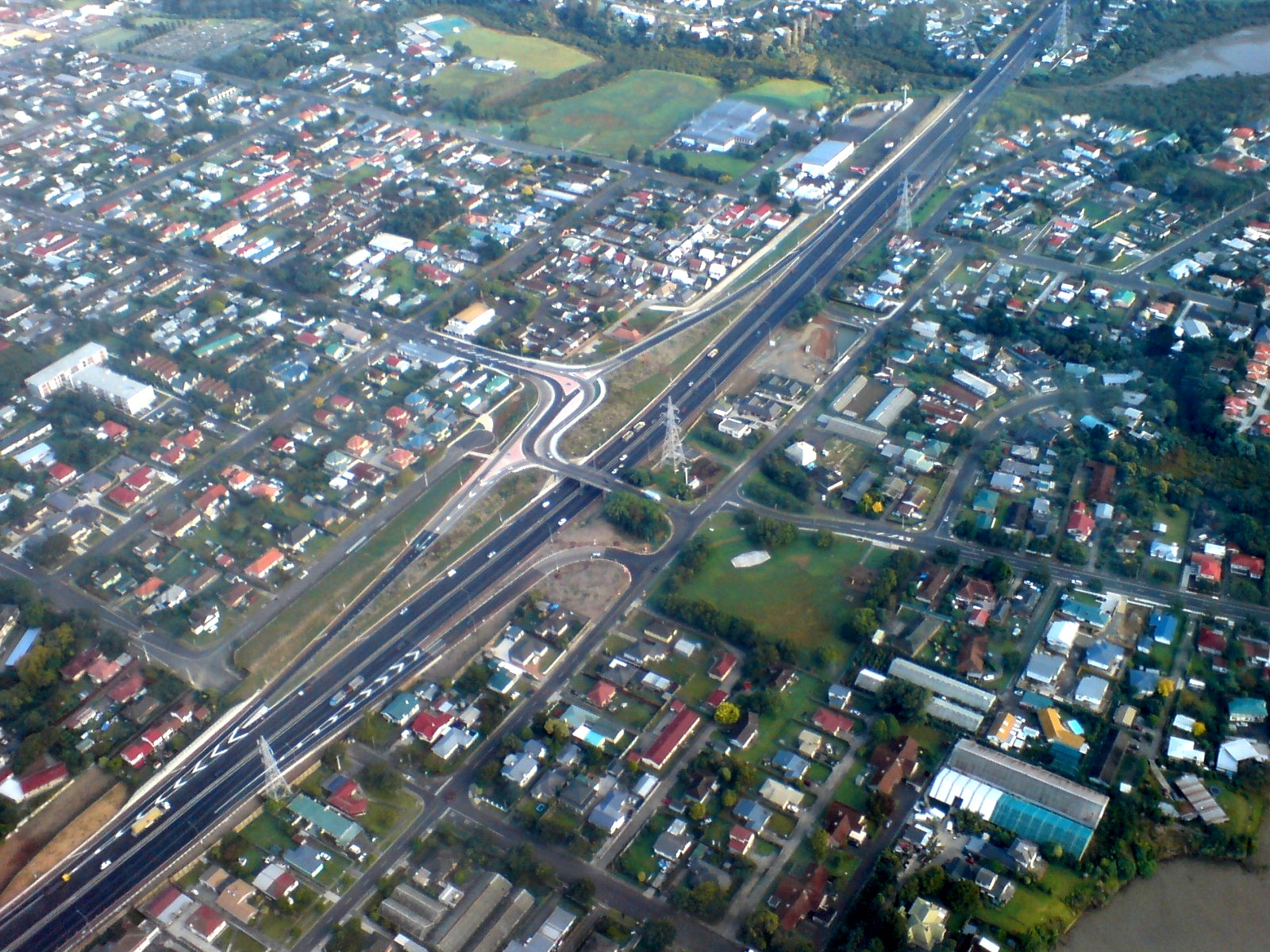
A power line following SH1 in South Auckland.

The backbone of New Zealand's national grid is the network of 220 kV transmission lines in each of the North and South Islands, which links the major power stations and the country's major cities. Supplementing this are 110 kV, 66 kV and 50 kV transmission lines, which supply provincial towns and cities with electricity from the 220 kV grid, and also connect smaller power stations to the grid.

=== Auckland and Northland ===
Auckland's power grid has suffered several famous blackouts, such as the 5-week long 1998 Auckland power crisis caused by failure of cables in the Mercury Energy distribution network.

Because of the location of the major load centres in Auckland city, the geography of the Auckland isthmus, and the historical development of the grid, all but one of the transmission lines from the south converge on Otahuhu substation creating limited redundancy in the network.

A major transmission failure occurred at Otahuhu substation on 12 June 2006, leading to the 2006 Auckland Blackout. It started at 8:30 am local time, with most areas of Auckland regaining power by 2:45 pm local time. It affected some 230,000 customers directly and at least 700,000 people in and around the city indirectly.

On 11 December 2006, the Electricity Commission (NZ) received an application from Transpower for the establishment of a new 220 kV gas insulated switchgear (GIS) facility adjacent to but geographically separate from the existing outdoor 220 kV switchyard at Otahuhu. This project was described as the Otahuhu substation diversity project, and included transferring approximately half of the circuits from the existing switchyard to the new GIS switchyard, to improve network resilience. The project was approved in August 2007.

On 30 October 2009 at around 8:00am, power was cut to the whole of Northland and most of the northern half of Auckland, affecting 280,000 consumers (14.5% of the country). A forklift carrying a shipping container accidentally hit one of the Otahuhu to Henderson 220 kV circuits while the other circuit was out for maintenance, leaving the region supplied by four low capacity 110 kV circuits. Power was restored to the entire region around 11:00am.

==== Grid Upgrade Projects ====
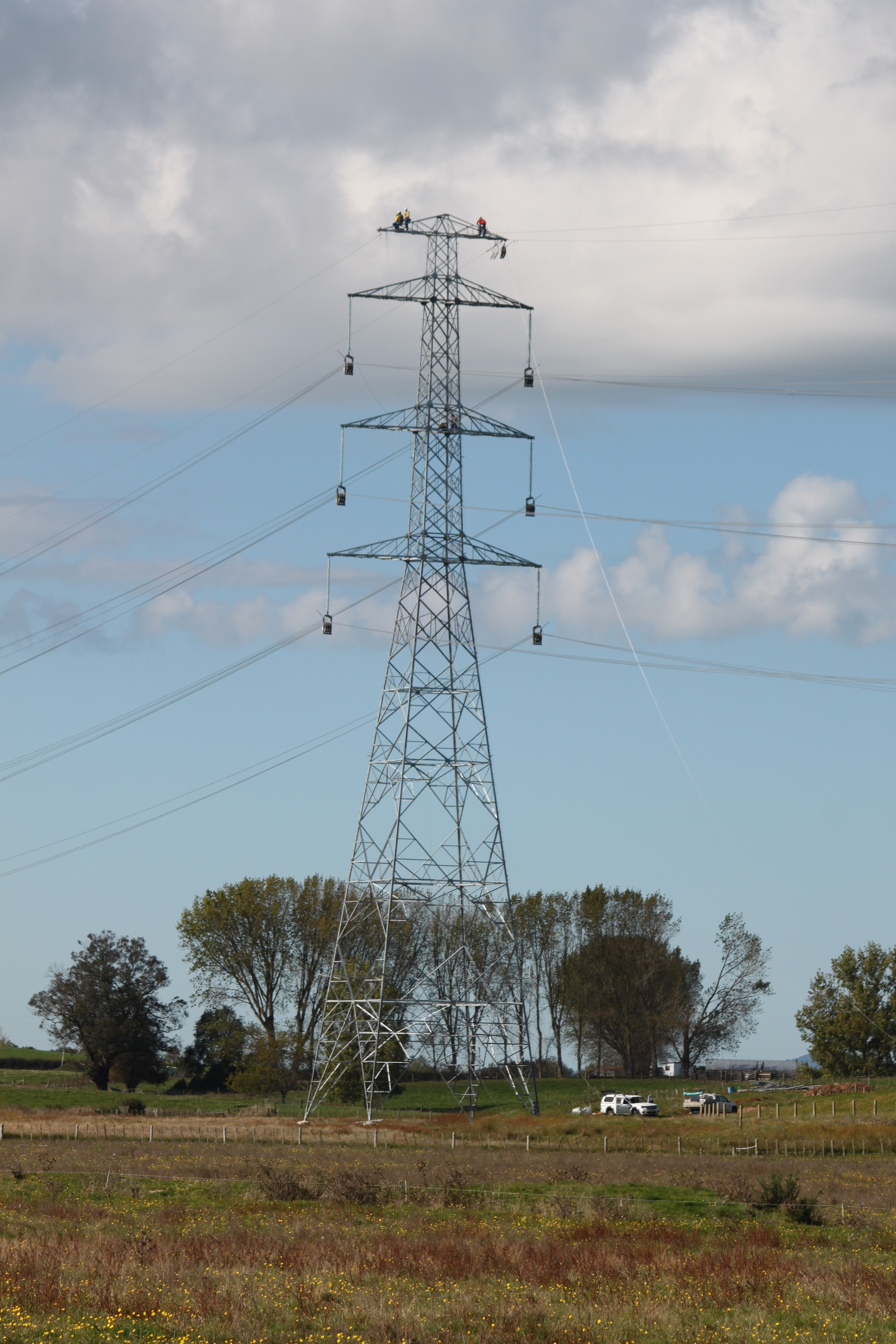
Tower under construction on the Whakamaru to Brownhill Road transmission line

The North Island Grid Upgrade (NIGU) between the southern Waikato region and central Auckland was a large and controversial transmission project. This project involved a 220 kV switching station at Drury, upgrading the existing 220 kV Otahuhu to Whakamaru C line, new capacitors at Otahuhu, Penrose, and Hepburn Road substations, and the construction of a new 220/400 kV transmission line between Whakamaru and Pakuranga.

Transpower submitted its initial investment proposal for the project in May 2005. The regulatory process for investment approval for the project created significant tension between Transpower and the Electricity Commission, and led to political pressure for progress, to ensure the security of electricity supply to Auckland. There were strong protests against the proposed transmission line during the initial planning and regulatory approval process from those most directly affected. Many individuals and communities living near the proposed route expressed concerns about the visual impact of the line, possible health effects, and the devaluation of their properties. A particular point of concern was that the proposed transmission towers were to be up to 70 metres (230 ft) in height. Cabinet Minister Pete Hodgson used powers under the Resource Management Act to "call in" Transpower's proposal, because of its national significance. He established a Board of Inquiry to consider the designations and resource consents required for the project. The Board of Inquiry gave its final approval for the project in September 2009.

A further grid upgrade project was completed to increase supply security to central Auckland, the North Shore, and further afield to Northland.

This project involved building a new 220 kV cross-harbour underground cable link between Pakuranga, Penrose, Hobson Street (Auckland CBD), Wairau Road (North Shore City), and Albany. The route crosses the Waitematā Harbour in a special cableway installed underneath the Auckland Harbour Bridge.

=== Wairakei ring ===
The Wairakei ring is a set of transmission lines north of Lake Taupō linking Wairakei with Whakamaru. These lines connect several hydro and geothermal power stations into the national grid, enabling their power to be exported to the major centres of electricity demand. A number of new geothermal power stations are being built or are planned for the area, and a higher capacity line is needed to transport their power to market. In December 2008, Transpower submitted a Grid Upgrade proposal to the Electricity Commission to build a new double circuit 220 kV line, Wairakei to Whakamaru C, to replace the single circuit Wairakei to Whakamaru B line. that was intended to help facilitate the connection of up to 1000 MW of new generation expected in the region over the next 5–7 years. The Commission announced their intention to approve the investment on 20 February 2009. Transpower completed the project in mid-2013. The estimated cost of the project was $141 million.

In October 2021, Transpower submitted a resource consent application to the Taupō District Council to build a series reactor on the Wairakei to Whakamaru A line at Ātiamuri. The reactor will re-balance the electricity flow between the A and C lines to allow an extra 500 MW to be transmitted towards Whakamaru, especially with the construction of Tauhara Power Station (152 MW) and Harapaki Wind Farm (176 MW).

=== Lower South Island ===
Transmission in the region is a mix of core grid (220 kV) and smaller (110 kV) lines. The 220 kV grid supplies major loads at Dunedin, Invercargill and Tiwai Point, from generation at Roxburgh and Manapouri. The 110 kV lines supply smaller load centres throughout the region including some larger industrial loads (Brydone fibreboard plant and Edendale dairy factory). Power transfer into and out of the region is primarily through the two Invercargill–Roxburgh circuits. There are two issues in this region:

- The available 220 kV transmission capacity from Roxburgh south to Invercargill and North Makarewa is limited. Additional capacity is required to maintain security of supply to Invercargill and North Makarewa during low hydrological inflow or low wind periods
- The 110 kV network is nearing capacity due to increasing demand in the region. It is vulnerable to loss of supply or low voltage when any 110 kV circuit or 220/110 kV inter-connecting transformer is out for maintenance. The smaller lines can also constrain the import of power into the region when Manapouri generation is low

The 220 kV and 110 kV circuits were also not inter-connected at Gore.

==== Reliability upgrade ====
A Lower South Island transmission reliability investment proposal was approved by the Electricity Commission in September 2010. The project has a maximum approved cost of $62.4m, and was originally scheduled to be completed by 2016. The scope includes:

- connect Gore substation to the existing 220 kV North Makarewa–Three Mile Hill line
- install new 220/110 kV transformers at Gore, and replacement transformers at Invercargill and Roxburgh
- install a series capacitor on one circuit of the North Makarewa–Three Mile Hill line to better balance power flows into Southland
- install special protection schemes on the 220 kV and 110 kV network.

The new interconnection at Gore was constructed during 2017-2018

==== Enabling renewables ====
On 30 November 2009, Transpower submitted Part V of the 2009 Grid Upgrade Plan (2009 GUP), Lower South Island Renewables Investment Proposal, with approval sought for up to $197 million. It was an economic, rather than a reliability investment proposal. At the time of submission, it was expected that a large amount of new renewable generation would be commissioned in the Lower South Island within the next few years. The proposal aimed to facilitate competition in the generation market, supporting renewable generation and improve the security of supply to the lower South Island region. The proposal was approved in April 2010.

Transpower's proposal was to upgrade five transmission lines between Roxburgh and the Waitaki Valley namely:

- Converting the Roxburgh to Livingstone section of the Roxburgh-Islington A 220 kV line to a duplex conductor configuration.
- Converting the Aviemore-Livingstone A 220 kV line to a duplex conductor configuration.
- Converting the Aviemore-Benmore A 220 kV line to a duplex conductor configuration.
- Converting the Roxburgh to Clyde section of the Roxburgh-Twizel A 220 kV line to a duplex conductor configuration.
- Thermally upgrading the Cromwell-Twizel A 220 kV line to a 75 °C (167 °F) rating.

In November 2011, Transpower reviewed the delivery schedule of this project in the absence of significant new generation being committed in the lower South Island. From that review it was confirmed that the Roxburgh to Clyde and Aviemore to Livingstone sections of work would proceed as planned but that other sections would be the subject of a further review on or before June 2013.

In 2019, Transpower restarted the remaining upgrade work on lines in the Clutha and Upper Waitaki area to enable more northwards power transmission in this region. The decision to start the remaining projects was in response to speculation about the possible closure of the Tiwai Point smelter. The projects were to be funded by agreements with Contact Energy and Meridian Energy. The purpose was to ensure that if the smelter closed, there was sufficient transmission capacity to ensure that energy from the southern hydro-electric generating stations could be transmitted north. The restarted projects included tower strengthening and the installation of duplex conductor on the Roxburgh - Livingstone circuits during the summers of 2020-2021 and 2021-2022. The new work also included upgrade of the Cromwell-Twizel circuits.

== HVDC Link ==
The HVDC Inter-Island link is New Zealand's only high voltage direct current (HVDC) system, and provides a connection between the North and South Island grids. The HVDC link connects to the South Island 220 kV grid at Benmore Power Station in South Canterbury. The power is transmitted via overhead transmission lines over 535 kilometres (332 mi) to Fighting Bay in Marlborough. From here, it crosses the Cook Strait via submarine power cables for 40 km to Oteranga Bay, west of Wellington. At Oteranga Bay, the HVDC line converts back to overhead lines to cover the last 35 km, with the line terminating and connecting to the North Island's 220 kV grid at Haywards in Lower Hutt.

The main reason for a power system connection between the two islands is due to New Zealand's geography and demographics. The South Island has a large number of rivers suitable for hydroelectricity generation, however 75% of New Zealand's population lives in the North Island. HVDC was chosen for the inter-island connection because it is a more practical and economical solution for long distance transmission, particularly where significant lengths of cable are required.

=== HVDC upgrade project ===
In May 2008, Transpower submitted a Grid Upgrade Plan proposal to the Electricity Commission for a major project to upgrade the HVDC system including:

- new HVDC converter stations at Benmore and Haywards to replace the existing mercury-arc valve converters
- seismic strengthening works for existing and new switchyards at both locations
- extensions to 220 kV switchyards at both locations
- replacement of control systems for the existing Pole 2 converter stations
- new unit connection transformers for four synchronous condensers at Haywards

On 25 September 2008, the Commission issued its final approval for the project, with an approved maximum cost of $672 million.

The project replaced the aging mercury arc rectifier Pole 1 converter stations with a new thyristor valve pole (known as Pole 3). Upgrades at the converter stations at Benmore and Haywards allowed the link to carry up to 1000 MW with future provision for 1400 MW.

== See also ==
- List of power stations in New Zealand
- List of New Zealand spans
- Electricity sector in New Zealand
- New Zealand electricity market
