= Whakamaru to Brownhill Road transmission line =

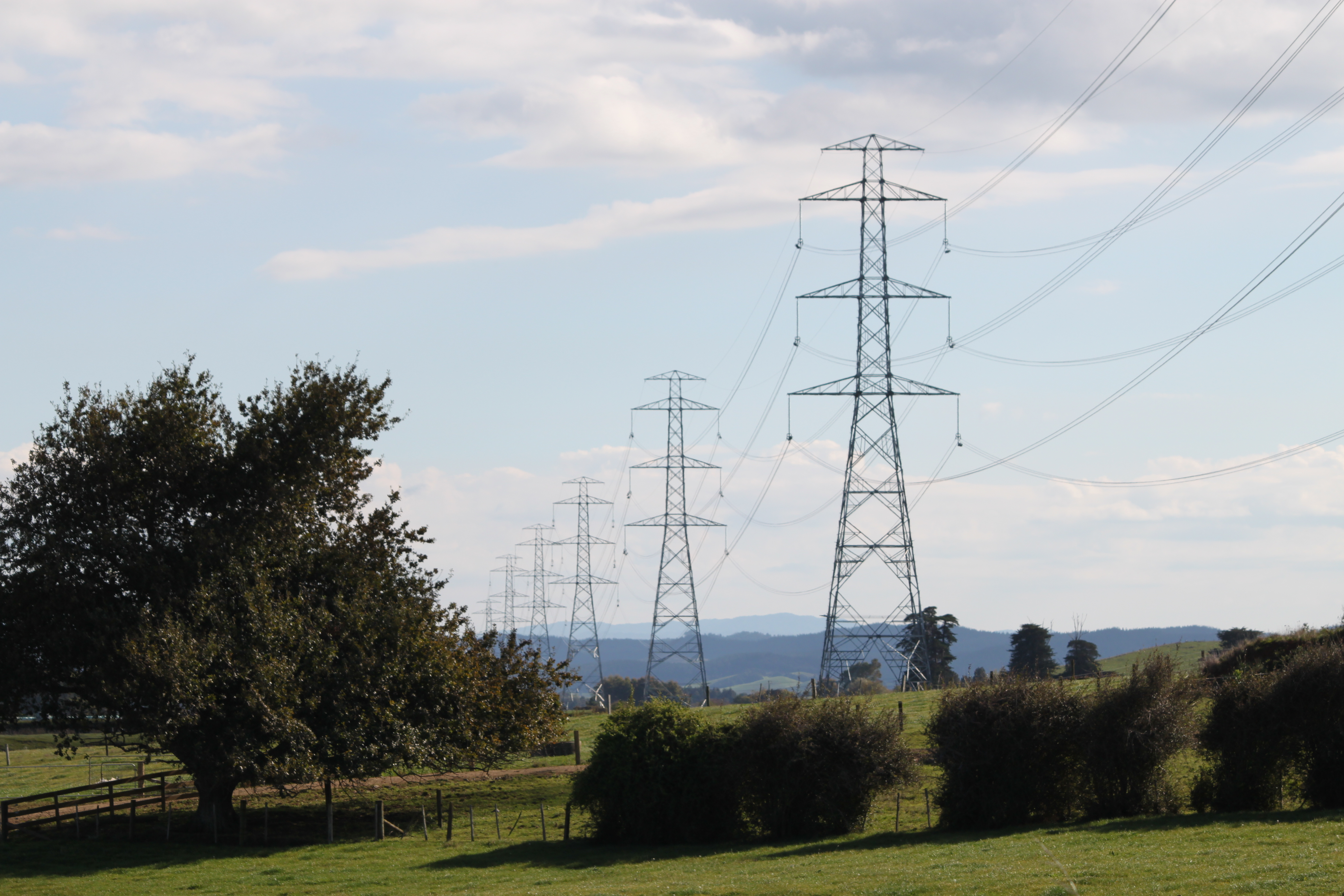
- Whakamaru to Brownhill Road transmission line near Te Kauwhata

Location
- Country: New Zealand
- General direction: South-North
- From: Whakamaru Power Station, southern Waikato
- To: Brownhill Road switching station, southeastern Auckland

Ownership information
- Owner: Transpower New Zealand
- Operator: Transpower New Zealand

Construction information
- Construction started: February 2010
- Commissioned: 30 October 2012

Technical information
- Type: Overhead transmission line
- Current type: HVAC
- Total length: 186 km (116 mi)
- Capacity: 2700 MVA per circuit at 400 kV
- AC voltage: 400 kV design 220 kV initially
- No. of circuits: Two

The Whakamaru to Brownhill Road transmission line is a double-circuit 400 kV-capable transmission line constructed by Transpower to increase the capacity of the National Grid between the southern Waikato and the city of Auckland. The line runs from the Whakamaru sub-station near the Whakamaru Power Station, over a distance of 186 kilometres (116 mi) to the new Brownhill Road substation near Whitford in southeastern Auckland. The line will initially be operated at 220 kV. From Brownhill Road, 220 kV underground cables connect the line to the Pakuranga sub-station in eastern Auckland. The project was the subject of considerable controversy and protest during the planning and approval stages. Construction of the line started in February 2010, and the line was commissioned on 30 October 2012. The transmission line forms the major part of a wider North Island Grid Upgrade project with a forecast cost to completion of $894 million.

== Overview ==
The line was a major enhancement to the National Grid and was designed to increase electrical supply and security to Auckland and Northland. The line provides more transmission capacity between the Waikato River hydro stations and Auckland, and takes load off the existing 220 kV lines. Prior to the commissioning of the new line, all existing major transmission lines into Auckland converged on the Ōtāhuhu substation, creating a concentration of risk to the security of supply to Auckland and Northland. The new line was terminated at the Pakuranga substation instead, creating diversity of electricity supply to Auckland.

The line was designed and built for 400 kV operation, but has operated since commissioning at 220 kV. In future, possibly by 2030, the installation of 220/400 kV transformers at Whakamaru and Brownhill Road would allow the transmission line to be operated at 400 kV, but the high cost of the required 400 kV transformers are unlikely to make that upgrade feasible. If upgraded to 400 kV operation, additional underground cables would be needed to connect Brownhill Road directly to Ōtāhuhu substation.

== Background ==
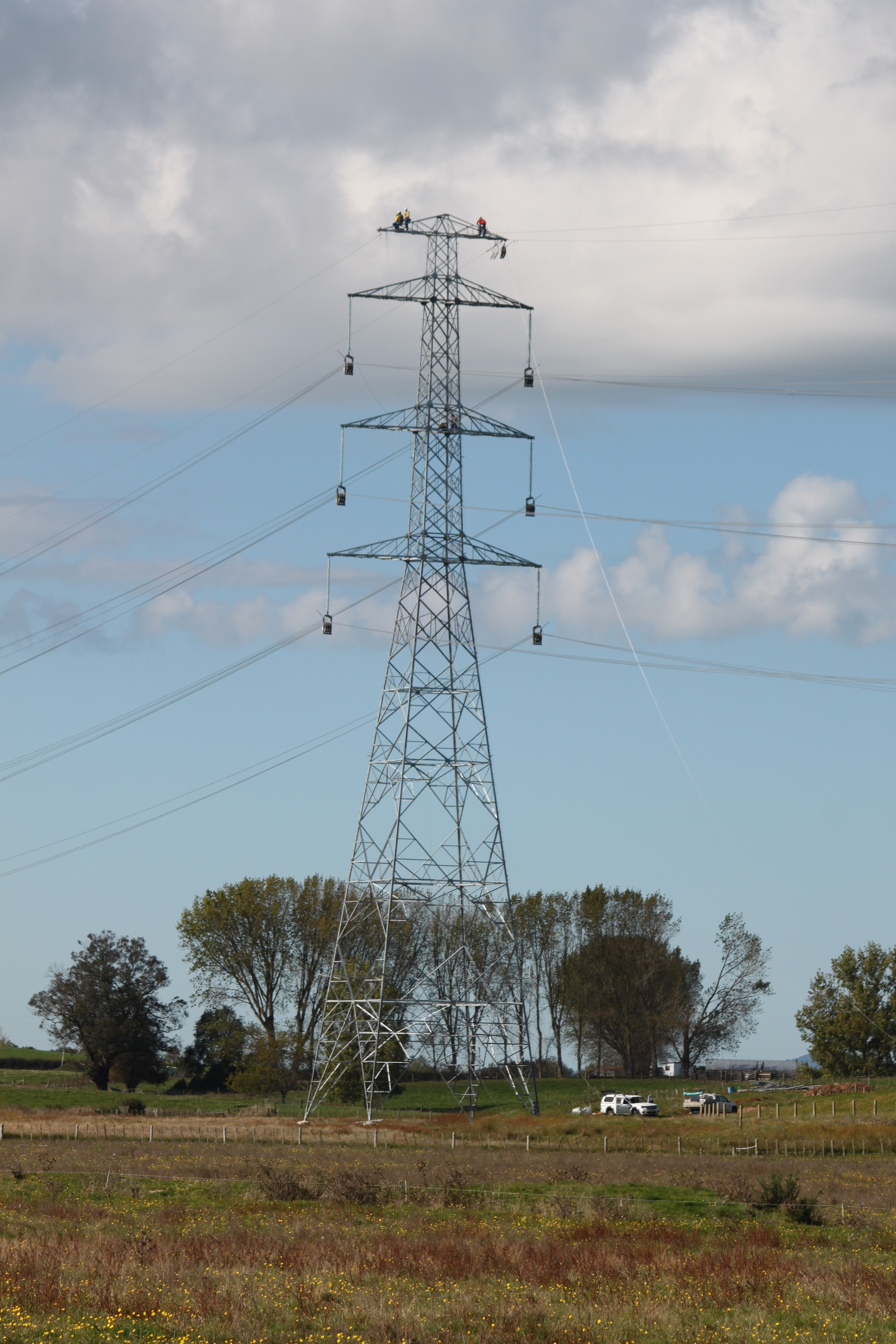
Tower under construction on the Whakamaru to Brownhill Road transmission line

There are very few electricity generating stations north of Auckland, which means that the electricity requirements for Auckland city and Northland must be supplied from the south - especially from the hydroelectric power stations on the Waikato River and the dual-fuelled Huntly Power Station.

Prior to the commissioning of this new transmission line, there were six lines running north into Auckland:

- A double-circuit 220 kV line from Ohinewai (near Huntly) to Ōtāhuhu via Huntly and Takanini, with one circuit also going via Drury.
- A double-circuit 220 kV line from Whakamaru to Ōtāhuhu via Ohinewai, with one circuit also going via Hamilton.
- Two single-circuit 220 kV lines from Whakamaru to Ōtāhuhu direct.
- A double-circuit 110 kV line from Arapuni to Ōtāhuhu, via Hamilton, Bombay and Wiri.
- A single-circuit 110 kV line from Arapuni to Bombay direct

The Ohinewai-Huntly-Ōtāhuhu line was the last of these transmission lines to be built into Auckland, commissioned in the late 1970s to export electricity out of the then under-construction Huntly Power Station. Since then, the population of the upper North Island has more than doubled, and electricity use has trebled.

Power supply to the Upper North Island is dependent largely on two major factors: the generation from Huntly and the transmission capacity between Huntly and Ōtāhuhu; and generation from Whakamaru and south of Whakamaru, and the transmission capacity between Whakamaru and Ōtāhuhu. For the transmission system as at 2010, issues that could arise during periods of high demand and low generation in the Auckland area included:

- an outage of a Huntly–Ōtāhuhu circuit may overload the other Huntly–Otahuhu circuit
- an outage of a Huntly–Ohinewai circuit may overload the other Huntly–Ohinewai circuit
- the two 220 kV Whakamaru-Ōtāhuhu circuits may overload during a contingency
- an outage of the Whakamaru-Hamilton circuit may overload the two 110 kV Arapuni–Hamilton regional circuits
- an outage of the Hamilton–Ohinewai circuit may cause low voltage at the Hamilton 220 kV bus.

The North Island Grid Upgrade (NIGU) project, including the Whakamaru to Brownhill transmission line, was intended to address these issues, although forecasts predict the last issue (Hamilton–Ohinewai outage causing low voltage at Hamilton) will reappear towards 2025. The project also increases the power transfer capacity into Auckland, and reduces the loading on the existing 220 kV Whakamaru-Ōtāhuhu and Huntly–Ōtāhuhu circuits, with a consequential reduction in the reactive support needed in the Upper North Island.

== Project Timeline ==
Key milestones in the history of the project are:

- 2004 – Transpower announced its intention to build 400kV line from Whakamaru to Auckland, but open for input on minor variations on exact route. Estimated cost $500 million.
- July 2004 – Founding and incorporation of New Era Energy Inc, an organization opposed to the 400 kV design and seeking less intrusive, and less costly transmission line alternatives
- May 2005 – Transpower submitted an Investment Proposal for a 400 kV line from Whakamaru to Ōtāhuhu to the Electricity Commission, under transitional provisions of the Electricity Governance Regulations 2003, which didn't provide the financial detail required by the Electricity Commission
- 30 September 2005 - Transpower submitted a Grid Upgrade Plan to the Electricity Commission, including several investment proposals, one of which was a revised version of the proposal for a 400 kV line from Whakamaru to Ōtāhuhu
- 27 April 2006 - Electricity Commission announced a draft decision to not approve the Transpower Grid Upgrade Plan proposal for a 400 kV line from Whakamaru to Ōtāhuhu (because it considered there were other lower cost alternatives)
- 20 October 2006 - Transpower submitted another revised proposal, for a 400 kV capable transmission line that would be initially operated at 220 kV, terminating south of Auckland, with 220 kV underground cables to Pakuranga substation
- 31 December 2006 - Roy Hemmingway departed Electricity Commission after his contract not renewed
- 31 January 2007 - The Electricity Commission issued a notice of its intention to approve the proposal but agreed to hold a public conference. The public conference was held in May.
- 27 May 2007 – Transpower lodged “Notices of Requirement” under the Resource Management Act 1991, with seven affected local councils
- 5 July 2007 – The Electricity Commission announced its final decision to approval the proposal
- August 2007 – New Era Energy announced it intends to file an application with the High Court in Wellington for a Judicial Review of the Electricity Commission decision to approve the Transpower revised proposal for a 400 kV capable transmission line.
- 9 August 2007 - Cabinet Minister Pete Hodgson announced he would use powers under the Resource Management Act to "call in" Transpower's proposal to build the electricity transmission line from Waikato to Auckland, because of its national significance, and establish a Board of Inquiry to consider the designations and resource consents required for the project
- 19 October 2007 - Ralph Craven departed Transpower, with $350,000 golden handshake.
- 25 March 2008 - Ministry for the Environment (MfE) Board of Inquiry commenced hearings of the Notices of Requirement and applications for resource consent
- 31 October 2008 – MfE Board of Inquiry hearings concluded
- 4 May 2009 – The High Court finds against New Era Energy's application for a Judicial Review of the Electricity Commission's approval of the project
- 27 May 2009 – MfE Board of Inquiry released its draft report and decision to approve the designations and consents required for the project under the Resource Management Act.
- 18 September 2009 – MfE Board of Inquiry released its final report and decision approving the designations and consents required for the project
- 4 May 2010 - First of the new transmission towers constructed
- 27 October 2011 - Stringing of conductor commenced
- 18 May 2012 - Transpower announced a $30M increase in the forecast cost of the project, taking the total to $894 M. The increase was attributed to increased costs of construction and costs of acquiring property rights.
- 20 May 2012 - Stringing reaches the single-circuit Karapiro to Hinerua 110 kV line north of Lake Karapiro. Supply to Hinerua substation is cut for seven hours, affecting Tīrau, Putāruru and parts of Matamata, while a structure is erected to protect the 110 kV line during stringing.
- 30 October 2012 - The line is commissioned, operating at 220 kV. Final cost $894 million.

== The route ==
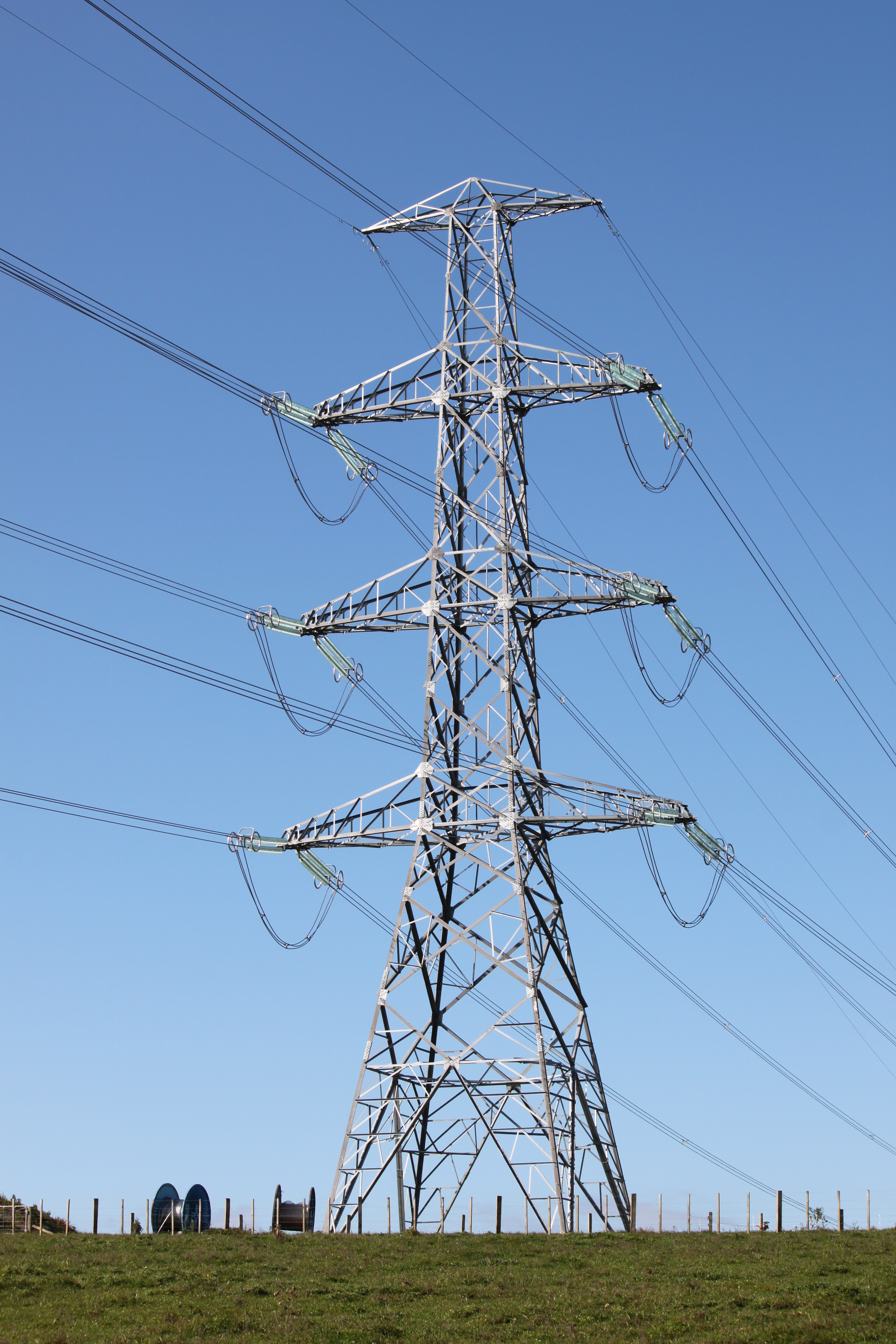
Whakamaru to Brownhill Road transmission line - strain tower under construction

The line commences at a newly constructed substation, Whakamaru North (also known as Whakamaru B), just outside the Whakamaru village. The new substation is 800 metres north of the existing main Whakamaru substation (Whakamaru A). A short tie-line connects the two substations. The double-circuit 220 kV Wairakei to Whakamaru C line, under construction and expected to be commissioned in 2013, will have one circuit connect to each substation, with the circuit passing via Te Mihi connecting to the Whakamaru A switchyard and the direct circuit connecting to the Whakamaru North switchyard.

From Whakamaru, the line travels approximately 186 km north-north-west through the South Waikato, Waipa, Matamata-Piako (passing just west of Morrinsville), Waikato and the Franklin ward of Auckland. The overhead line terminates at a new substation at Brownhill Road, near Whitford, close to the south east Auckland urban boundary. From there, two sets of underground cables connect to Pakuranga substation, which despite the name is near Botany Town Centre in eastern Auckland (the suburb of Pakuranga is 5 km east of the substation). Each cable circuit has a continuous rating of around 660 MVA.

The underground cable route from Brownhill to Pakuranga is 11 km long, and follows Brownhill Road, Sandstone Road and Caldwells Road, weaving through the suburban streets of Dannemora to Te Irirangi Drive until the final approaches to Pakuranga substation.

=== Sites ===
- Whakamaru (main) substation: 38.41908°S 175.80037°E
- Lake Karapiro/State Highway 1 crossing: 37.95117°S 175.61946°E
- State Highway 26 crossing: 37.66578°S 175.50534°E
- State Highway 2 crossing: 37.24605°S 175.19592°E
- Brownhill Road substation: 36.97259°S 174.96113°E
- Pakuranga substation: 36.92594°S 174.90666°E

== Technical description ==
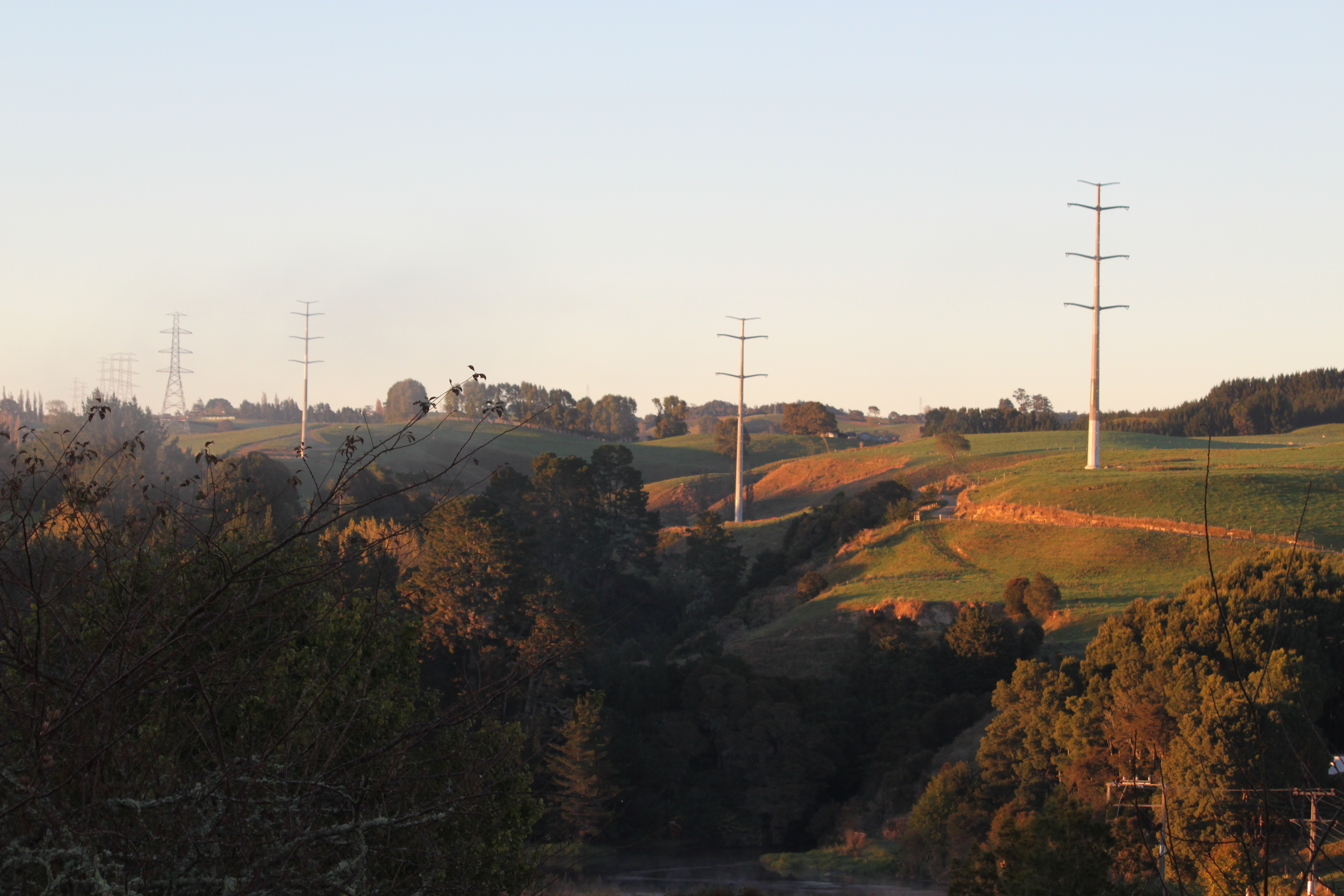
Monopoles near Lake Karapiro.

The transmission line is a double circuit line, supported mostly on steel lattice towers. The route length is 186 kilometres (116 mi) and there are 426 structures. The average height of the towers is 60 metres, with some up to 70 metres tall. The average span length between towers is 437 metres, with a maximum span length of 824 metres.

Almost all of the transmission structures are steel lattice towers, but there are seven monopole structures in the Lake Karapiro area (three on the north bank, and four on the south bank). This area had been classified as a Special Landscape Character Area in the Waipa District Plan. The final report of the Board of Inquiry accepted Transpower's proposal to use monopoles instead of lattice towers in this area, and this became a requirement as part of the resource consent conditions for the project.

The transmission line uses a bundled arrangement of three conductors (called a Triplex arrangement) in each phase of each circuit. The conductor type is an All Aluminium Alloy Conductor (AAAC) with a code name of Sulphur. The composition of the aluminium alloy 1120 used in Sulphur conductor includes copper, manganese, magnesium, zinc, iron, chromium and silicon. Conventional transmission line conductors used historically in New Zealand are aluminium conductor steel reinforced (ACSR). The major advantage of the all aluminium alloy conductor over ACSR is its superior strength to weight ratio and its lower electrical resistance for the same cross-sectional area. This leads to lower costs for the transmission line structures, and lower electrical losses over the lifetime of the conductor. AAAC conductors also have superior corrosion resistance when compared with ACSR.

A Sulphur conductor is a stranded AAAC consisting of 61 strands, each of 3.75 mm diameter, with a nominal cross sectional area of 673 square millimetres (1.043 sq in). The overall diameter of each conductor is approximately 33.8 millimetres (1.33 in). The design capacity of the new line when operating at 400 kV, was 2700 MVA per circuit, At 220 kV, the circuits would normally operate at 851/890 MVA (summer/winter), with the capacity to operate up to 1490 MVA during contingencies.

The cables in the underground section from Brownhill Road to Pakuranga are each around 160 millimetres (6.3 in) in diameter, and weigh 40 kilograms per metre (81 lb/yd). Each cable circuit comprises three cables. The rating of each cable circuit is 660 MVA.

The project included the removal of the 145 km long Arapuni-Pakuranga 110 kV transmission line first built in 1940, requiring the removal of 460 towers.

== Regulatory and industry environment ==
Both Transpower and the Electricity Commission were fairly new to the regulatory environment in 2004, and there had been substantial changes in the way the New Zealand electricity industry was structured since the reforms to transform the industry from a government department to free market competition began in 1987. Transpower was split from Electricity Corporation of NZ into a standalone state owned enterprise (SOE) on July 1, 1994. Ralph Craven was the second CEO of Transpower, and took up his role in 2002. The Electricity Commission began operations on 14 September 2003, and it comprised six members, of which Roy Hemmingway was appointed as founding Chair. A new regulatory environment took effect in April 2004, with the Electricity Commission now responsible for assessing grid upgrade investment proposals by Transpower. In October 2004, the responsibilities of the Commerce Commission for regulatory oversight of pricing by Transpower were introduced. The regulatory process for approval of the series of investment proposals and grid upgrade plans submitted by Transpower beginning in 2005 created significant tension between Transpower and the Electricity Commission, and led to political pressure by Government ministers for progress to ensure the security of electricity supply to Auckland.

== Controversy and protest ==
Well organized and visible opposition to the proposed 400 kV transmission line began within a few weeks of the initial announcement of an intended 400 kV transmission line by Transpower in 2004. The most vocal opposition group was New Era Energy Inc, which organized protests at Transpower initiated consultation meetings, fronted for media comment, co-ordinated submissions to the Electricity Commission and the resource consent hearings, and did fundraising for the legal expenses which would soon come. A committee consisting of David Graham (Putāruru), Christina Baldwin (South Waikato), Bob McQueen (Te Miro), Lorraine Bilby (Morrinsville), Rob Storey (North Waikato), Catherine Tuck (Clevedon) and Steve Hunt (Hunua) guided the efforts of the organization. An extensive website (notowers.co.nz, no longer operating) was managed by Kate Brennan, and held repositories of information about the health dangers of EMF fields around transmission lines, and resources about transmission lines from other countries.

In 2004 and early 2005, Transpower undertook to organize a series of information meetings in local halls and communities along the route. On 24 February 2005, angry protesters stormed out of a Transpower public meeting in Tīrau, and effigies of the Transpower CEO Ralph Craven and Prime Minister Helen Clark were burned in the street. There were strong protests against the proposed transmission line during the initial planning and regulatory approval process. Many individuals and communities living near the proposed route expressed concerns about the visual effect of the line, possible health effects, and the devaluation of their properties. A particular point of concern was that the proposed transmission towers were to be up to 70 metres (230 ft) in height.

The Electricity Commission under Hemmingway also organized meetings during this time for information dissemination about its processes, and to gather feedback from the public. These were much better received than the Transpower meetings. The Electricity Commission was also doing financial analysis of the Transpower proposal, and conducting modelling on electricity demand, generation, and consumption data.

In April 2006, the Electricity Commission announced its intention to decline Transpower's investment proposal for the 400 kV line, on the grounds that it was not the most cost-effective solution. However, on 12 June 2006, the vulnerability of power supply to Auckland was revealed when a major non-transmission failure occurred at the Ōtāhuhu substation, leading to the 2006 Auckland Blackout. It started at 8:30 am local time, with most areas of Auckland regaining power by 2:45 pm local time. It affected some 230,000 customers representing at least 700,000 people in and around the city. This incident brought back memories of a much more serious 1998 Auckland power crises which lasted 5 weeks, and was caused by the failure of underground power cables leading to the CBD. The public mood in 2006 demanded that something be done to secure Auckland's electricity supply, and the politicians were listening.

In June 2006, Hemmingway and the other Electricity Commission members, together with senior Transpower executives were summoned to meet Energy Minister David Parker and Finance Minister Michael Cullen, and were bluntly told to reach an agreement. Later that year, Hemmingway was not re-appointed as chairperson of the Electricity Commission when his term expired, and on his departure expressed frustration at the political involvement in the regulatory process.

Transpower then submitted a revised proposal to the Electricity Commission, which retained the 400 kV capable towers, but removed the expensive 220 to 400 kV transformers at the ends of the new line. This significantly reduced the cost of the revised proposal, but it also meant that the higher efficiency and capacity of 400 kV transmission would not be possible. It also meant that the objectionable height and scale of the transmission towers would still remain, but they would be significantly overbuilt to handle the lower 220 kV voltages.

During the consideration of the revised proposal by the Electricity Commission, the new acting Chairperson of the Electricity Commission, a more compliant replacement to Hemmingway who seemed intent on approving Transpower's revised proposal, was sworn at and abused at a public meeting in Hamilton in February 2007. A large number of submissions opposing the revised proposal were made to the Electricity Commission in writing or in presentations at public conferences held by the Commission in May 2007. In July 2007, the Electricity Commission, under the new acting Chairperson who had replaced Hemmingway, announced that it had approved the revised proposal. This was met with astonished disbelief and anger by those opposed to the proposal.

In November 2007, New Era Energy announced that it would seek a judicial review of the decision by the Electricity Commission to approve the project. The High Court hearing was held in Wellington. This legal action by New Era Energy was ultimately unsuccessful, with the High Court rejecting the application in May, 2009.

A Board of Inquiry was established to consider the designations and resource consents for the project and began hearings in March 2008, which ran through to October that year. It received a total of 1244 submissions, of which 1160 were opposed to the project. Even after September 2009, when the Board of Inquiry announced its approval for the designations and resource consents for the project, many directly affected people were still protesting against the project.

Some protests against the transmission line continued during the construction period.

However, ultimately, landowners with lines on or over their property signed easement agreements with Transpower. In the Annual Report for 2010–2011, Transpower recorded that easements had been obtained on all the 318 properties crossed by the new line, without Transpower having to use powers of compulsory acquisitions.

== Land purchases ==
Transpower purchased a large number of properties from owners to enable the creation of easements that would allow the line to be constructed. Many of the larger properties were dairy farms, and these were bought at a time of high dairy commodity prices. Transpower recorded losses in the value of these properties of approximately $30 million in one year and $20 million in the subsequent year resulting from a decline in dairy commodity prices.

== See also ==
- Overhead power line
- High-voltage cable
- National Grid (New Zealand)
- Electricity sector in New Zealand
- Electric power transmission
