= Union Rotoiti =

History
- Name: Union Rotoiti
- Owner: Union SSCo 1977–99, ANZDL 1999–2005, CP Ships 2005–06
- Port of registry: New Zealand
- Route: Trans Tasman
- Builder: BHP, Whyalla Steelworks
- Cost: $30 million
- Yard number: 61
- Laid down: 19 September 1975
- Launched: 12 November 1976
- Completed: 22 June 1977
- Identification: IMO number: 7366233
- Fate: Broken up Chittagong, Bangladesh 2007

General characteristics
- Type: Container and Ro-Ro
- Tonnage: 23,971 GRT
- Length: 203.2 m LOA
- Beam: 26.3 m
- Propulsion: 1977–86 1 × General Electric MM5262RB gas turbine 1986–2007 2 × Wärtsilä diesel
- Speed: 19 knots

Union Rotoiti was a large roll-on/roll-off vessel operated on the trans Tasman route by the Union Steam Ship Company of New Zealand (USSCo.). Along with her sister ship Union Rotorua, she was unusual in that she originally had turbo-electric transmission.

== Construction ==
Union Rotoiti was built by BHP's Whyalla Steelworks in South Australia. She was completed on 22 June 1977. Delivery was delayed by a year and costs went over budget by $8 million, bringing the total cost to $30 million. It was subsequently acknowledged that Rotoiti and her sister ship Rotorua could have been built for half the price if they had been built outside Australia.

Union Rotoiti was unusual in that she was powered by gas turbine. The ship's main gas turbine / electric machinery consisted of a single General Electric MM5262RB gas turbine operating on a regenerative cycle. This was coupled to an AC generator to provide a maximum designed continuous rating of 18822 kW for a motor propeller speed of 200 rpm. The turbine speed of 4670 rpm was reduced to 1500 rpm for the generator by a reduction gearbox. The generator output 6.6 kV 3-phase at 50 Hz to the ships motors. There were four closed air circuit water cooled synchronous AC motors, arranged with two per shaft. Previous USSCo vessels had traditionally had twin outward turning fixed pitch propellers, however Union Rotoiti has twin inward turning controllable pitch propellers. This decision was made in the interests of manoeuvrability, since the center of thrust is in the outer part of the disk thus giving a larger turning moment arm. In normal running configuration the whole system could be controlled by a single lever from the bridge. The speed of the gas turbine was controlled by a solid state control and safety system integrated with the propulsion controls. Because of high fuel use it was subsequently converted to diesel power at the State Dockyard, Newcastle in 1986.

Union Rotoiti was also interesting in its use of ro-ro for the Trans Tasman route. The cargo did not necessarily just contain truck and trailer units, but also had cargo stacked in the decks using forklifts. This necessitated the vehicle decks of the ship being built to withstand the loading of up to 39 t per axle that could be exerted by a heavy forklift. Union Rotoiti was built with a large angled stern ramp that allowed her to unload her cargo at any wharf without the need for a specialist linkspan as required by most ro-ro ships. She also had a bow door which could be used if a linkspan was present in a port, thus allowing cargo to be worked both forward and aft speeding up turn around time.

== Incidents ==
In May 1980 Union Rotorua was on passage from Tauranga to Sydney when she broke down 200 miles west of Cape Maria van Diemen. Union Rotoiti was only 80 miles away and the two masters agreed to attempt a tow. Captain Andrew Keyworth, one of the most senior masters of the USSCo, was the master of Union Rotoiti. With much skill on his part, and while the ships were sometimes only 25 metres apart, a line was made fast between the two ships by use of a line-carrying rocket. Once the tow began 422 nm were covered in just over 56 hours at an average speed of 7.5 knots. It was a feat never before accomplished with two ships of this size, and Captain John Warren of the Union Rotorua later exclaimed: ‘If anyone had previously tried to tell me it was possible … I would have thought them quite barmy’.

On 23 April 1999, New Zealand Transport Accident Investigation committee reported Union Rotoiti as losing power in the Tasman Sea.
