= 1998 Auckland power crisis =

Major power outage in New Zealand

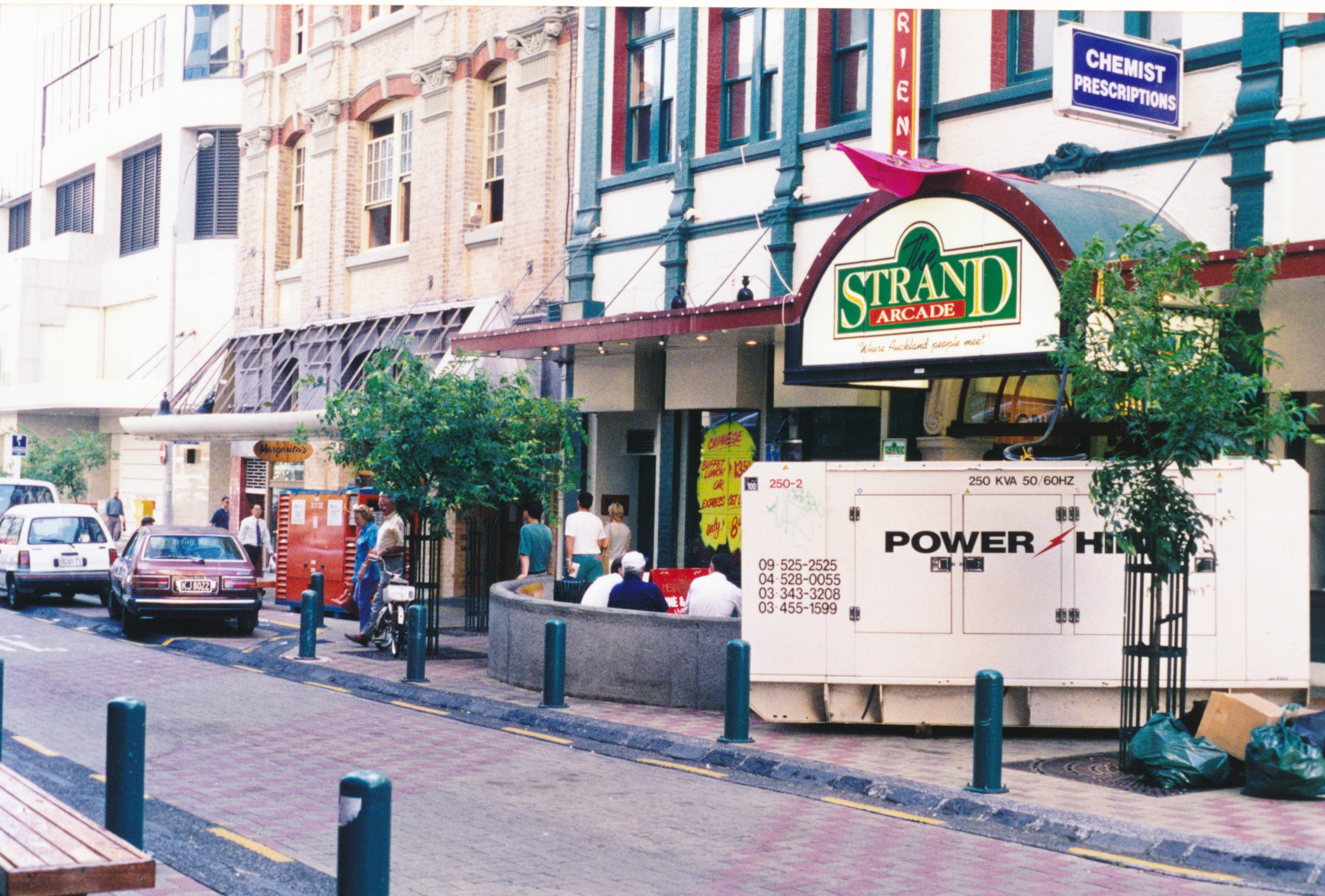
- A diesel generator outside the Strand Arcade in central Auckland
- Date: 19 February – 27 March 1998
- Location: Auckland central business district, New Zealand
- Type: Blackout
- Cause: Cable failure

The 1998 Auckland power crisis was a five-week-long power outage affecting the central city of Auckland, New Zealand, from 19 February to 27 March 1998. A 1998 ministerial inquiry criticised both the Auckland Electric Power Board and its privatised successor, which had halved its staff after taking over in October 1993. The report blamed risk and asset management and contingency planning, but said reviews of the electricity network were in accordance with industry practice. However, Mercury Energy's Board had known for 5 years of a potential failure of the power cables, but, instead of also replacing them, they took the cost-saving risk of only building a replacement tunnel, which wasn't ready in time. The inquiry report also said, "Internal expertise in 110 kV assets was not maintained at a sufficient level".

At the time, almost all of Auckland's central business district was supplied with electricity by Mercury Energy Limited via four 110 kV power cables from the national grid at Transpower's Penrose substation, with two cables each connecting to two central city substations at Liverpool Street and Quay Street. The two cables connecting to Quay Street were 40-year-old gas-insulated cables that were past their replacement date. One of the Quay Street cables failed on 20 January, possibly due to the unusually hot and dry conditions, although this did not warrant a crisis as the three remaining cables could still supply the central city. The second Quay street cable failed on 9 February, leaving only the Liverpool Street cables supplying the city. Due to the increased load from the failure of the first cables, these remaining two cables failed on 19 and 20 February, leaving the entire central city supplied by a single 22 kV cable from Kingsland, resulting in about 20 city blocks (except parts of a few streets) losing all power.

Queen Street was almost deserted for the first few days, as few businesses could operate. Some brought goods out onto the street to sell, but heavy rain in the first week made that impractical. Generators were brought in from around the country to power essential services and some businesses. These made Queen Street a very noisy place and thus deterred customers. Some businesses estimated that the outage cost them at least NZ$60,000 per week.

In the five weeks it took to restore the power supply, about 60,000 of the 74,000 people who worked in the area worked from home or relocated offices in the suburbs. Some businesses relocated staff to other New Zealand cities, or even to Australia. The majority of the 6,000 apartment dwellers in the area had to find alternative accommodation. Temporary power was supplied to the Port of Auckland by the Union Rotorua, a gas turbine powered cargo ship.

The old gas cables were found to be repairable and were put back into service, but were restricted to 30 MVA capacity. The newer oil cables were irreparable, so to restore full supply to the city, a temporary 110 kV overhead line was constructed along the rail corridor between Penrose and Liverpool Street.

Energy Minister Max Bradford commissioned an independent report into the Auckland power supply failure. The report of the Ministerial Inquiry was released on 21 July 1998.

Following the crisis, Mercury Energy Limited disposed of its electricity and gas retail business, renamed Vector Limited, replaced the cables, and reinforced the supply in Auckland. In 2001, a 9 km (5 mile) tunnel from Penrose to Hobson Street via Liverpool Street was completed, containing two new 110 kV cables to replace the damaged Liverpool Street cables and the temporary overhead line. A third 110 kV cable was installed from Mount Roskill to Quay Street via Liverpool Street, largely superseding the old gas cables which were eventually decommissioned.

== See also ==
- 2006 Auckland Blackout
- List of major power outages
