= Andrew Stanley Keyworth =

Captain Andrew Stanley Keyworth
- Born: 2 December 1923; Auckland, New Zealand
- Died: 25 July 1996 (aged 72)
- Occupation: Mariner

Andrew Stanley Keyworth (2 December 1923 – 25 July 1996) was a New Zealand master mariner. He was born in Auckland, New Zealand, on 2 December 1923.

Long-time captain for the Union Steam Ship Company of New Zealand, Keyworth is famous for his rescue of the Union Rotorua while captaining the Union Rotoiti in 1980.
