= Transpower New Zealand =

New Zealand state-owned power transmission company

Transpower New Zealand Limited
- Type: State-owned enterprise
- Industry: Electricity transmission
- Founded: 1994; 32 years ago
- Headquarters: Wellington, New Zealand
- Key people: Michele Embling, Chair; James Kilty, Chief Executive
- Revenue: ▲NZ$1,150 million
- Total assets: NZ$7,515 million employed
- Total equity: NZ$1,706 million
- Website: www.transpower.co.nz

Transpower New Zealand Limited (TPNZ), known simply as Transpower, is the state-owned enterprise responsible for maintenance and transmission of the electric power grid in New Zealand. It performs two major functions in the New Zealand electricity market: as the owner of the National Grid, it provides the infrastructure of electric power transmission that allows consumers to have access to generation from a wide range of sources, and enables competition in the wholesale electricity market; and as system operator, it manages the real-time operation of the grid and the physical operation of the electricity market.

Transpower was initially formed as an operating division of the Electricity Corporation of New Zealand (ECNZ) in 1987. In 1994 it was separated from ECNZ and corporatised to become a state-owned enterprise with its own board of directors and ministerial shareholders, the Minister of Finance and the Minister of State-Owned Enterprises. The New Zealand Treasury's Commercial Operations group (formerly the Crown Ownership Monitoring Unit) monitors the performance of Transpower on behalf of the shareholding ministers.

== Role of the National Grid ==
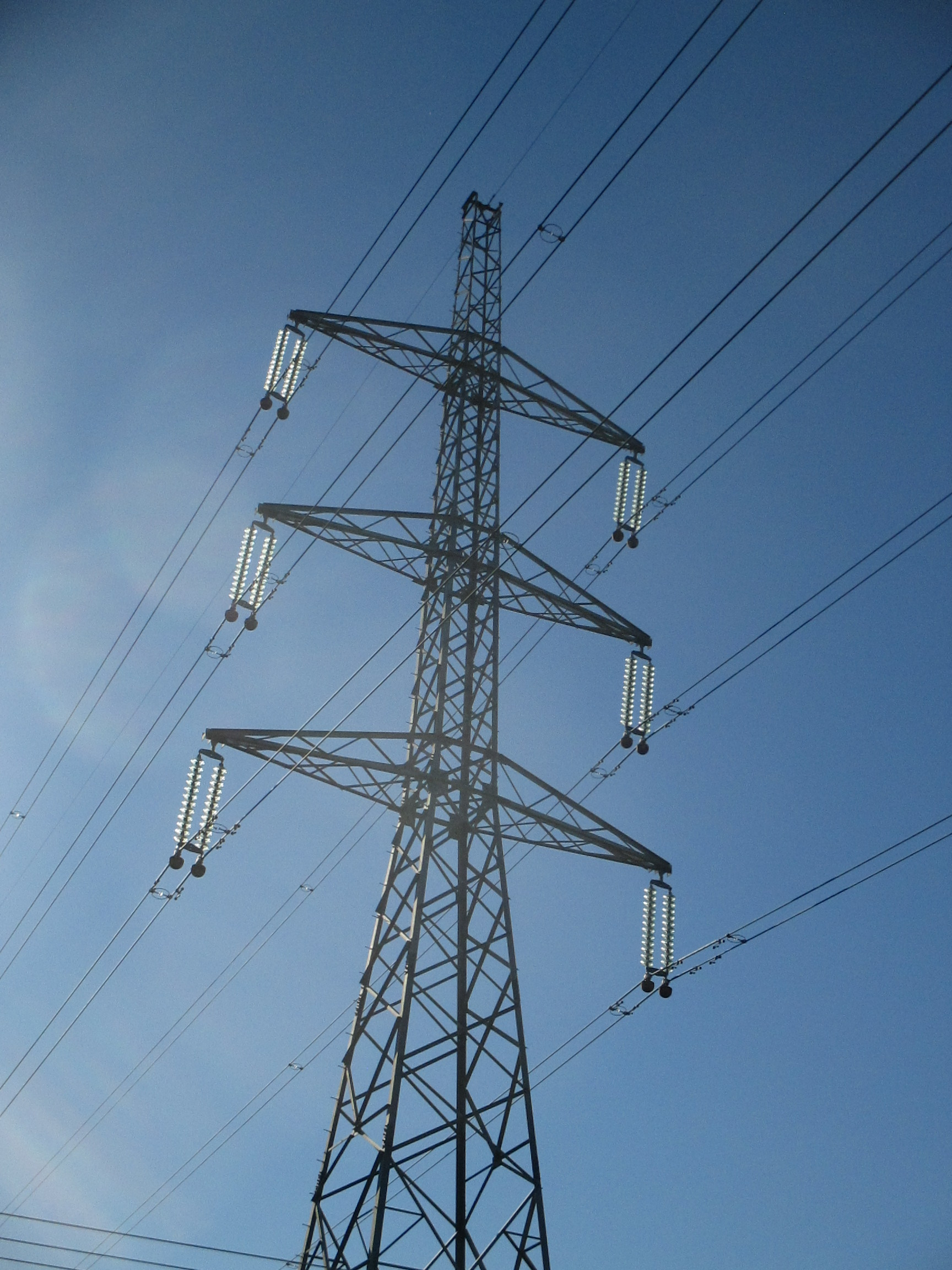
Power transmission lines near Bunnythorpe, New Zealand

The New Zealand national grid provides the means of transporting bulk electricity from where it is generated (by companies like Meridian Energy and Mercury Energy) to cities, towns and some major industrial users like the Tiwai Point Aluminium Smelter. Most of the electricity from the national grid is delivered to New Zealand's homes and businesses by electricity distribution companies like Vector and Orion. A few large industrial users are directly connected to the national grid.

Transpower owns and operates 11,806 kilometres (7,336 mi) of transmission lines. A core network consisting of 5,719 kilometres (3,554 mi) (route) of 220 kV transmission lines exist in each island (one line is built to 400 kV but operates at 220 kV), and this is supplemented by 4,719 kilometres (2,932 mi) of 110 kV transmission lines and 797 kilometres (495 mi) of 66 kV and 50 kV transmission lines, which interconnect the core grid to smaller load centres and power stations. Transpower also owns and operates the HVDC Inter-Island, a 611-kilometre (380 mi) ±350 kV high-voltage direct current link between the two islands. There are 178 electrical substations, containing 1116 transformers with a total capacity of 14,500 MVA.

== Regulation under the Commerce Act ==
The revenue that Transpower receives for the provision of the transmission service is regulated by the Commerce Commission, under Part IV of the Commerce Act. The type of regulation is individual price-quality path (IPP) regulation, and came into effect on 1 April 2011. The individual price-quality path governs Transpower's revenues for each pricing year, with the paths being reset either every four or five years. Quality targets for the transmission service are also reviewed and monitored in the regulatory process.

== Role of the system operator ==
The role of the system operator is to manage the security of the power system in real time and co-ordinate the supply of and demand for electricity, in a manner that avoids fluctuations in frequency or interruptions of supply. The system operator is required to maintain a continuous (second-by-second) balance between electricity supply from power stations and demand from consumers, and also ensure the provision of reserves that will allow for sudden contingencies. The system operator achieves this by determining the optimal combination of generating stations and reserve providers for each market trading period, instructing generators when and how much electricity to generate, and managing any contingent events that cause the balance between supply and demand to be disrupted. System operations staff undertake this work using sophisticated energy modelling and communications systems. In addition to its roles of real-time dispatch of generation and managing security, the system operator also carries out investigations and planning to ensure that supply can meet demand and system security can be maintained during future trading periods. Examples of planning work may include co-ordinating generator and transmission outages, facilitating commissioning of new generating plant and procuring ancillary services to support power system operation.

The system operator service is provided and funded under an agreement with the Electricity Authority.

== See also ==
- Electricity sector in New Zealand
