= Hobson Street =

Street in Auckland, New Zealand

Coordinates: 36.850°S 174.761°E

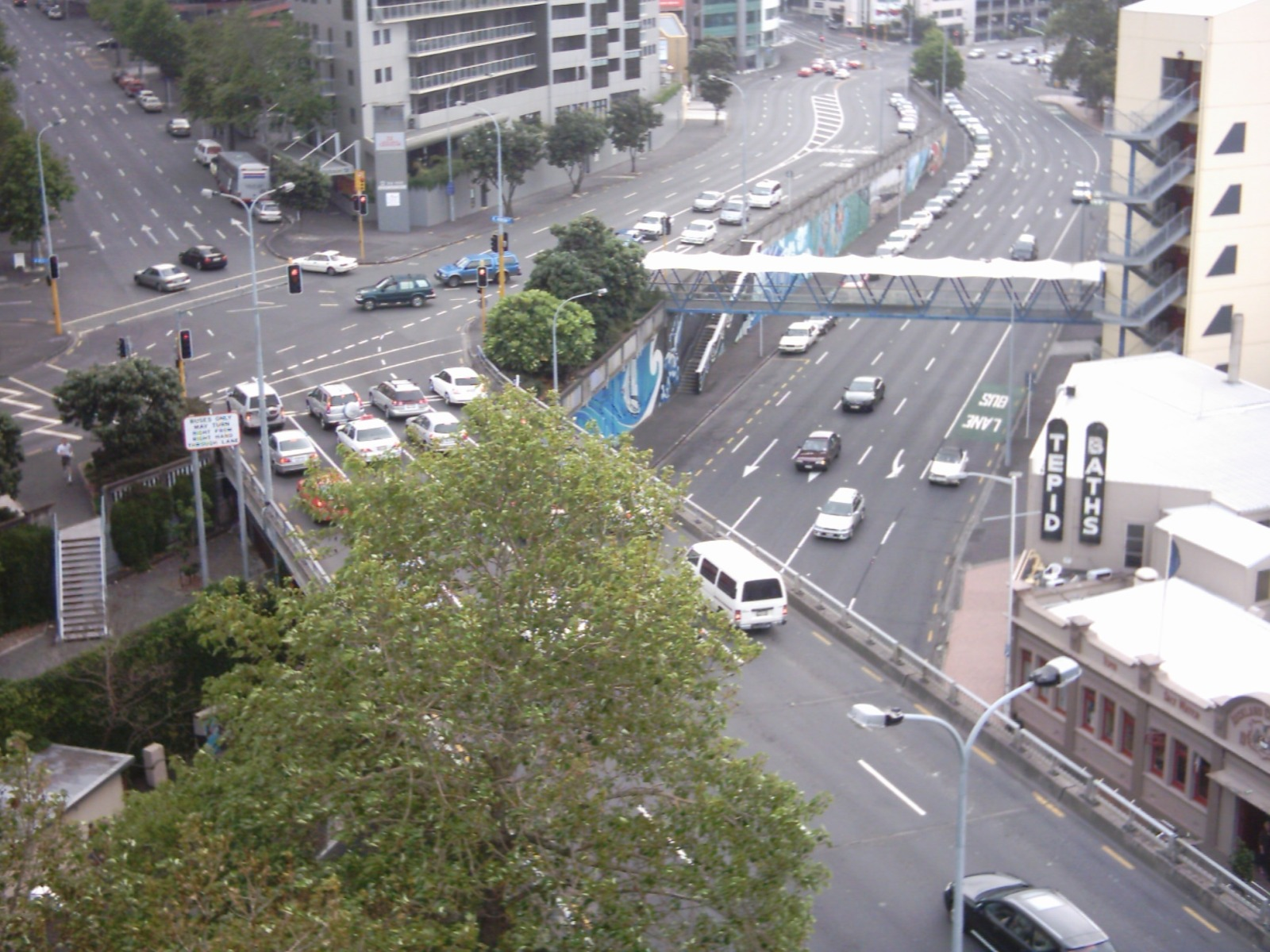
- Lower Hobson Street crossing Sturdee St, 2006
- Length: 1.4 km (0.87 mi)
- Location: Auckland CBD, New Zealand
- Postal code: 1010
- North end: Quay Street
- South end: Auckland Northern Motorway

Hobson Street is a major street in Auckland, New Zealand. It lies on the western side of Queen Street. It is a commercial and high-rise residential street, and provides access to the Auckland Northern Motorway going south, and the Northwest Motorway going west. For most of its length it is one-way. One block to the west is Nelson Street, which is one-way in the other direction and provides access to the central city for traffic exiting from the motorways. One block to the east is Albert Street, part of Mayoral Drive, and Vincent Street. The area encompassed by these streets is called Hobson Ridge by Statistics New Zealand.

== History ==
Hobson Street existed by 1842 but it was not initially entirely urban, with the Auckland City Council being asked to prevent cattle from obstructing its footpaths in 1870. The street was named after the first Governor of New Zealand, William Hobson.

By 1884, the street was an important route for horse-drawn trams travelling south to Ponsonby and Karangahape Road, as the steep southern portion of Queen Street was unsuitable for horses. By the early 20th century, Hobson Street had become a busy thoroughfare to reach the western suburbs of central Auckland, such as Ponsonby and Grey Lynn.

The Nelson Street-Hobson Street one-way system was in place in the early 1970s.

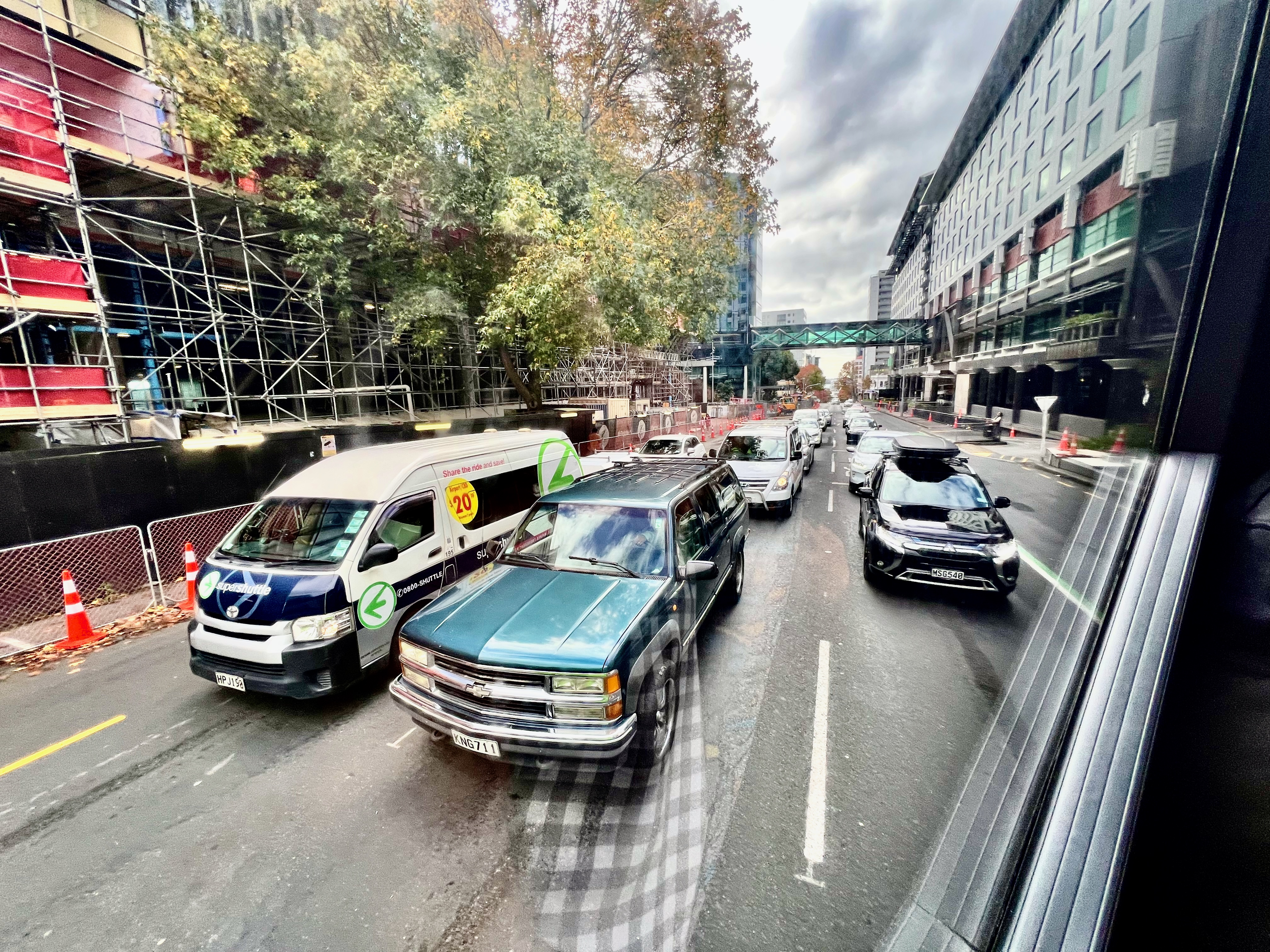
Buses heading north from SkyCity cut across all four lanes of Hobson Street. In 2024 construction work was continuing on extension of the convention centre

Since 1996 SkyCity and its InterCity bus terminal have been accessed from Hobson Street.

== Demographics ==
The statistical areas centred on Hobson Street cover 0.37 km^{2} (0.14 sq mi) and had an estimated population of 7,650 as of June 2025, with a population density of 20,676 people per km^{2}.

Historical population
Year	Pop.	±% p.a.
2006	4,533	—
2013	7,098	+6.62%
2018	8,190	+2.90%
2023	6,483	−4.57%

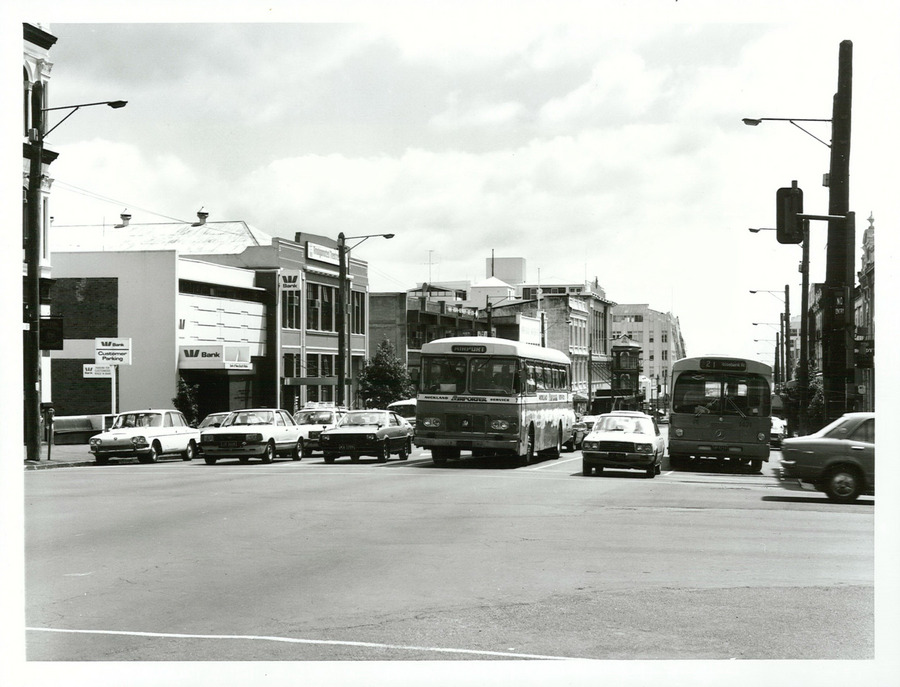
Hobson Street in 1982

The Hobson Street statistical areas had a population of 6,483 in the 2023 New Zealand census, a decrease of 1,707 people (−20.8%) since the 2018 census, and a decrease of 615 people (−8.7%) since the 2013 census. There were 3,465 males, 2,952 females and 69 people of other genders in 3,675 dwellings. 10.0% of people identified as LGBTIQ+. There were 393 people (6.1%) aged under 15 years, 2,640 (40.7%) aged 15 to 29, 3,171 (48.9%) aged 30 to 64, and 273 (4.2%) aged 65 or older.

People could identify as more than one ethnicity. The results were 30.3% European (Pākehā); 9.3% Māori; 6.1% Pasifika; 55.7% Asian; 6.9% Middle Eastern, Latin American and African New Zealanders (MELAA); and 1.6% other, which includes people giving their ethnicity as "New Zealander". English was spoken by 93.2%, Māori language by 2.6%, Samoan by 1.1%, and other languages by 46.3%. No language could be spoken by 1.8% (e.g. too young to talk). New Zealand Sign Language was known by 0.5%. The percentage of people born overseas was 68.3, compared with 28.8% nationally.

Religious affiliations were 24.8% Christian, 12.2% Hindu, 3.4% Islam, 0.7% Māori religious beliefs, 4.3% Buddhist, 0.6% New Age, 0.3% Jewish, and 3.0% other religions. People who answered that they had no religion were 45.0%, and 5.9% of people did not answer the census question.

Of those at least 15 years old, 2,631 (43.2%) people had a bachelor's or higher degree, 1,947 (32.0%) had a post-high school certificate or diploma, and 1,521 (25.0%) people exclusively held high school qualifications. 624 people (10.2%) earned over $100,000 compared to 12.1% nationally. The employment status of those at least 15 was that 3,405 (55.9%) people were employed full-time, 798 (13.1%) were part-time, and 327 (5.4%) were unemployed.

Individual statistical areas
Name	Area (km^{2})	Population	Density (per km^{2})	Dwellings	Median age	Median income
Hobson Ridge North	0.15	2,304	15,360	1,428	31.3 years	$46,700
Hobson Ridge Central	0.06	2,616	43,600	1,449	30.1 years	$33,800
Hobson Ridge South	0.16	1,563	9,769	798	32.1 years	$37,300
New Zealand					38.1 years	$41,500

== Notable locations ==
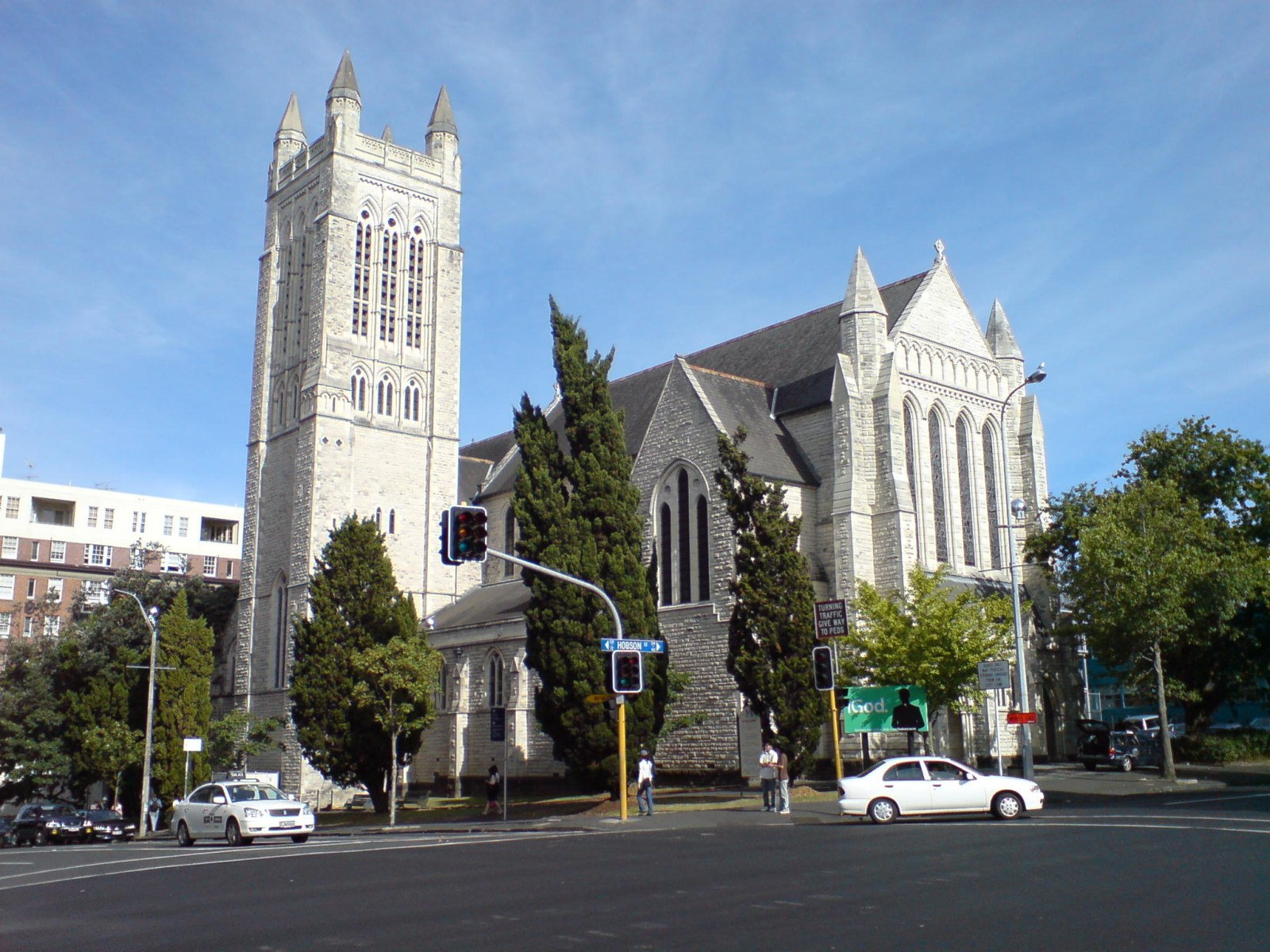
St Matthew in the City

- Auckland Harbour Board Workshops, corner Lower Hobson and Quay Street, 1944-1989, site spread between Lower Hobson St, Customs Street and Quay Street, repair of boats, cranes and other equipment.
- Tepid Baths, corner Customs and Lower Hobson Streets, 1914, public indoor pool complex.
- St Patrick's Presbytery, corner Wyndham and Hobson Streets, 1888, priest's residence and administrative centre of the Roman Catholic Diocese of Auckland. Part of the St Patrick's Cathedral site.
- Farmers Building, 35 Hobson Street, 1914, Retail, office and warehouse for Farmers Trading Company 1914-1991.
- St Matthew-in-the-City, 132-134 Hobson Street, 1905, neo-gothic Anglican church.
- Higher Thought Temple, 1 Union Street, late 1920s, non-denominational church associated with the New Thought movement.
- Wesleyan Chapel, 8A Pitt Street, 1860, oldest surviving brick church in New Zealand. Owned by the Independent Order of Odd Fellows for most of the 20th century.
