= Waitahora Wind Farm =

Abandoned renewable energy project

- A simulated image of the proposed Waitahora Wind Farm.
- Country: New Zealand
- Location: Puketoi Range
- Coordinates: 40.362314°S 176.17328°E
- Status: Proposed
- Owner: Contact Energy

Power generation
- Units operational: 65
- Nameplate capacity: 177 MW

The Waitahora Wind Farm was a proposed renewable energy project in New Zealand planned by Contact Energy but which has now been abandoned without construction beginning (see resource consent process below). This development was proposed to be located on the Puketoi Range which forms one side of the picturesque Waitahora Valley, near Dannevirke in the Manawatū-Whanganui Region.

It was planned to have up to 65 wind turbines with a capacity of up to 177 MW. The proposed towers were to be 100m high, with a total height of 150m. The windfarm was opposed by a local residents group, representing a large proportion of local residents.

In 2013, Contact announced that the project would not proceed in the foreseeable future. Consents for the project lapsed in 2016.

== Resource consent process ==
The windfarm required resource consent approval, a licensing process administered by local government. The consent application for this project was publicly notified on 30 September and submissions closed on 30 October 2008. The consent hearing was held in February 2009. Three independent landscape architects gave evidence at the hearing, and all agreed that the Puketoi range was an outstanding natural landscape.

The application for resource consents for this project was declined in 2009,. This is not unusual, as several renewable energy projects were declined resource consents (see Awhitu, Mokau hydro, Mount Cass, Te Waka).

Contact Energy appealed the decision to decline the consent application and presented a substantially revised proposal, especially with regards to the limestone geology and sediment control. One of the consenting authorities, Horizons Regional Council, stated that consents should not have been declined on the basis of discharge of contaminants to groundwater, and that the consents should be granted. The Environment Court upheld the appeal and granted consents for the revised wind farm in 2010. The lapse period granted for the consents was five years.

No construction began on this project and the consents lapsed in April 2016. There was no application made to extend them. No official statement has been released by Contact Energy but it is understood that the development of other more economic renewable energy projects (principally geothermal) coupled with an uncertain outlook for future electricity demand growth made this project unattractive for investors. As of April 2016, this appears to be the first proposed wind farm in New Zealand to have allowed its construction consents to lapse. Other wind farms have had their consents extended, although the approval of consent extensions may not continue indefinitely.

== Related issues ==
There are two other industrial scale wind farm developments planned for the Puketoi range and surrounding area, the 53 turbine (Mercury) Puketoi wind farm (south of Waitahora) and the 286 turbine (Genesis Energy) Castle Hill wind farm (south of Puketoi). Five power companies (including Contact Energy, developer of the proposed Waitahora Wind Farm) asked for the district plan to be modified to avoid hindering wind energy generation projects. TrustPower asked for the Puketoi ranges to be removed from the list of outstanding natural features, or for "skyline" to be more clearly defined. Contact Energy also asked for the Puketoi Ranges to be removed from the Council list of outstanding natural features until a district wide assessment of landscape features can be undertaken, despite their own landscape architect (as well as two others) already concluding that the Puketoi Range is indeed an outstanding natural feature (see references below). These changes would make it easier to get local government approval for large scale wind energy developments. The power companies involved have not publicised their attempts to change the district plan. Cross submissions on the proposed District Plan closed on 3 October 2008.

Transpower, the national grid owner-operator, has issues exporting electricity generated from the area, as there are no appropriate transmission lines to connect to in the area. Although the nearest lines are 20 km away at Dannevirke, they are low capacity 110 kV lines that are already constrained by generation from the Te Āpiti Wind Farm connecting at Woodville. Even with the now completed reconductoring of the Woodville-Mangamaire-Masterton line, and the proposed reconductoring of the Woodville-Bunnythorpe line, only 110 MW of generation could be potentially attached to the existing lines. For the Waitahora wind farm to be connected the national grid, a new 220 kV transmission would have to be built from the wind farm to Bunnythorpe substation or the Bunnythorpe-Linton-Haywards-Wilton 220 kV line

== See also ==
- Wind power in New Zealand
- Electricity sector in New Zealand
