= Mount Cass Wind Farm =

Proposed wind farm in New Zealand

- Country: New Zealand
- Location: Canterbury
- Coordinates: 43°4′30″S 172°50′15″E
- Status: Planned
- Owner: Yinson Renewables

Wind farm
- Type: Onshore
- Hub height: 76.5 m
- Rotor diameter: 120 m
- Rated wind speed: Generates electricity up to 122 km/h, and withstands gusts up to 350 km/h

Power generation
- Make and model: Siemens Gamesa SWT-DD-120
- Units planned: 22 x 4.3 MW
- Nameplate capacity: 94.6 MW

The Mount Cass Wind Farm is a proposed wind farm to be located east of Waipara on Mount Cass in the Canterbury region of New Zealand. The project dates back to 2006, and the current plan by MainPower is to construct 22 wind turbines along a ridge of Mount Cass.

Resource consent was initially refused by the Hurunui District Council in 2009 but approved by the Environment Court in 2011. Preliminary work began in 2019 with the intent to be completed by late 2021, but was delayed by animal conservation concerns among other issues. As of July 2024 the project's status is unclear after a major investor pulled out.

== Proposal ==
The current design would install 22 Siemens Gamesa SWT-DD-120 wind turbines on Mount Cass, Waipara. It would have a maximum generation of 94.6 megawatts, enough to power 40,000 homes. As of 2019 the proposed wind farm would have been the largest in the South Island, though today the also-proposed Southland Wind Farm in The Catlins would be larger.

== History ==
MainPower, a North Canterbury lines company, initially proposed the wind farm in 2006. It erected a 50 meter monitoring mast in April 2006, with plans to lodge resource consents in 2007. The original proposal was for a wind farm of between 15 and 25 MW, but subsequently increased to between 35 and 63MW. It applied for resource consent from the Hurunui District Council in June 2008, with public consultation on the consent starting in January 2009. MainPower's managing director said of the 6.5 km long wind farm that it had "the potential to provide enough electricity to supply all the homes in the Hurunui and Waimakariri districts. He acknowledged, though, that MainPower had heard concerns over the ecological impact during its own consultation of the public.

By May 2009, the district council had declined the consents, on the basis that the site was an outstanding natural feature of national significance which the wind farm would degrade. Groups such as Forest and Bird and the Mt Cass Protection Society supported the decision to decline. MainPower appealed the decision to the Environment Court. The court received submissions from 72 parties; supporters noted the importance of renewal energy to achieve government policy, while opponents were concerned with damage to the limestone ecosystems and habitats, and the noise and visual impact on locals. The court granted consent to a significantly modified design in December 2011. The judge noted that the area was not "an untouched, pristine natural environment - fire and farming have depleted and degraded the vegetation and habitat for fauna', and that the proposed land offset and conservation management measures would improve biodiversity in the area. The consent was originally due to lapse in February 2020, but was extended until 2025.

Preliminary work on construction began in December 2019, with the intent to complete construction by late 2021. Work was interrupted in December 2020 by the possible discovery of a colony of critically endangered New Zealand long-tailed bats on a nearby property. In April 2021 wildlife monitoring determined that there were no bats present. Construction was then scheduled to begin in late 2021.

In September 2021, MainPower announced that the project was "transitioning to an alternative delivery model". The company had intended to operate with a turnkey contract with General Electric. MainPower said this model had become uneconomic particularly due to the effects of COVID-19, and was instead moving to a multi-contract model. In June 2023 MainPower stated that two permanent 76.5m meteorological masts had been installed to provide ongoing wind data, further geotechnical work had been undertaken, and contractors had been engaged for the main works.

In September 2023, MainPower announced a partnership with Marlborough Lines Limited. Marlborough Lines bought a 50% financial interest in the wind farm through its subsidiary Energy Marlborough, which it had created in 2021 to get into power generation. The two entities created and jointly owned a company called GreenPower New Zealand to run the project. MainPower said it expected construction to begin in 2024.

In May 2024, Marlborough Lines refused further funding for the project. In July 2024 it ended its involvement in the project. Marlborough Lines would not say why it had left the project. According to its chief executive, the Mount Cass project had cost Marlborough Lines the equivalent of a year's profit. As of July 2024, MainPower had not commented on what its next steps will be.

In February 2025, the Hurunui District Council extended the wind farm's resource consent by five years, until 2030.

In December 2025 the project was bought by Yinson Renewables, and construction was expected to start in early 2026. The same month, Yinson signed a 15 year power purchase agreement to provide the wind farm's output to Genesis Energy Limited.

== See also ==
- Wind power in New Zealand
- List of power stations in New Zealand
