= Puketoi Wind Farm =

Wind farm proposal in New Zealand

- Country: New Zealand
- Location: Puketoi Ranges
- Coordinates: 40°32′23″S 176°3′23″E
- Status: Proposed
- Owner: Mercury Energy

Power generation
- Units operational: up to 53
- Nameplate capacity: 310 MW

The Puketoi Wind Farm is a proposed wind farm project in the Tararua District of New Zealand. The project is planned by Mercury Energy.

== History ==
Mercury Energy (then known as Mighty River Power) applied for resource consent for the project in August 2011. Consent for 53 turbines and a transmission line was granted in June 2012. Three appeals against the project were withdrawn in June 2013. Mighty River said they did not expect to begin construction for three to five years. The consent lapses in 2023.

In March 2019 Mercury announced that development of the nearby Turitea Wind Farm would support the future development of Puketoi. In March 2021 Mercury had no estimated completion date for the project. In March 2023 that the resource consent had been extended until 2031 and that the allowed turbine blade diameter had been increased.

== Location ==
The proposed site is in the Puketoi Ranges, approximately 40km south of Dannevirke. The site will be connected to Mercury's existing Turitea Wind Farm with a 220 kV transmission line.

== See also ==
- Wind power in New Zealand
- Waitahora Wind Farm
- Castle Hill Wind Farm
