= Flat Hill Wind Farm =

Wind farm in New Zealand

- Country: New Zealand
- Location: Southland
- Coordinates: 46°34′51″S 168°17′6″E
- Status: Operational
- Construction began: 2014
- Commission date: August 2015
- Owner: Southern Generation Limited Partnership
- Operator: Pioneer Energy

Wind farm
- Type: Onshore
- Hub height: 44 m (144 ft)
- Rotor diameter: 52 m (171 ft)

Power generation
- Units operational: 8
- Make and model: Gamesa: G52
- Nameplate capacity: 6.8 MW
- Annual net output: 26 GWh

External links
- Website: pioneerenergy.co.nz/projects-and-partnerships/sustainable-cities/project-case-study-1/

The Flat Hill Wind Farm is a wind farm in New Zealand constructed by Pioneer Energy. It is located three kilometres (1.9 mi) west of Bluff in the Southland Region of the South Island. It stands at an altitude of 100 metres (330 ft) on the hill that gives it its name.

Resource consents were applied for in 2012 and, following appeal to the Environment Court, the consent was confirmed in March 2013. Construction began in late 2014 and the eight-turbine wind farm was commissioned in August 2015.

== See also ==
- Wind power in New Zealand
- List of power stations in New Zealand
