= Project Hayes =

Proposed wind farm in South Island, New Zealand (2006–2012)

- Country: New Zealand
- Location: Otago
- Coordinates: 45°30′39″S 169°53′3″E
- Status: withdrawn
- Owner: Meridian Energy

Power generation
- Units operational: 176
- Nameplate capacity: 630 MW

Project Hayes was a controversial wind farm proposed for the Lammermoor Range of Otago, New Zealand. The project was developed by Meridian Energy from 2006 to 2012 at a cost of $8.9 million.

It had a proposed capacity of up to 630MW, at the time making it the largest wind farm project in the southern hemisphere. The proposed farm would have covered an area of approximately 92 km², used up to 176 wind turbines and cost up to $2 billion. Meridian initially won resource consent for the project in 2007, but these were overturned by the Environment Court in 2009, and Meridian eventually announced it was withdrawing its application for consent in January 2012.

The project was named after engineer Eben Ernest Hayes (1851–1933), founder of the Hayes Engineering Works in Otago. He developed a windmill to power his engineering works from 1910 to 1927, and manufactured windmills for pumping water on farms.

== Resource consent process ==
In May 2006, Meridian announced three public consultation days to explain Project Hayes. Between July and October 2006, Meridian lodged applications for resource consents with the Central Otago District Council and with Otago Regional Council.

Resource consents for Project Hayes were granted in 2007, however the decision was appealed to the Environment Court. The project was opposed by a number of people, including the former All Black Anton Oliver who is also opposing the nearby Mahinerangi Wind Farm. The respected painter Grahame Sydney and poet Brian Turner also opposed the wind farms. Meridian spent more than NZ$7.6 million on the consenting process.

In November 2009, the Environment Court declined the consents as they concluded that the project did not achieve sustainable management under the Resource Management Act 1991 because the substantial adverse impacts, principally on the outstanding natural landscape, outweighed the positive factors, principally the large quantity of renewable energy.

Meridian stated that the Environment Court, in requiring a comprehensive and explicit cost-benefit analysis including hypothetical projects, had effectively created a new legal test for projects to overcome. Consequently, Meridian appealed the Environment Court decision to the High Court. In August 2010, the High Court allowed Meridian's appeal and sent the case back to the Environment Court to be reconsidered, with Meridian to present further evidence on alternative locations. The opponents of the project (the Maniototo Environmental Society, Upland Landscape Protection Society, John and Sue Douglas and Ewan Carr) filed notice to appeal the High Court Decision to the Court of Appeal. Meridian's lawyers asked the High Court to clarify its decision in respect of the Central Otago district plan landscape categories. As of February 2011, no dates had been set for the next round of court hearings.

In January 2012, Meridian announced it had withdrawn the applications for resource consent. Meridian Chief Executive Mark Binns stated "... other projects now are a higher commercial priority than Project Hayes".

== See also ==
- Wind power in New Zealand
