= Awhitu Wind Farm =

Wind farm in the Auckland Region, New Zealand

- Country: New Zealand
- Location: near Waiuku, New Zealand
- Coordinates: 37°16′S 174°40′E
- Status: Proposed
- Owner: Private

Power generation
- Units operational: 3

The Awhitu Wind Farm is a renewable energy project in New Zealand, located on the Āwhitu Peninsula near Waiuku on the west coast south of Auckland.

== History ==
The project was initially developed by Genesis Energy with plans for up to 18 wind turbines with a capacity of up to 25 MW. Maximum height to the tip of the blades was 90m.

In 2004, the wind farm received carbon credits from the New Zealand government, under a scheme to promote renewable energy for electricity generation. However, local councils denied the application for resource consents. This project was notable in being one of the few power projects to be denied resource consents.

Genesis Energy appealed to the Environment Court, which, in 2005, granted the resource consents until the year 2015, overturning the decision of the local councils. Genesis subsequently sold development rights to a landowner, who approached Trustpower to progress the project. In 2016, Tilt Renewables demerged from Trustpower. By 2016 the project was being pursued by private development.

A single turbine was erected in 2020. As of December 2023, three turbines had been erected.

== See also ==
- Wind power in New Zealand
- Electricity sector in New Zealand
