= Mill Creek Wind Farm =

Wind farm in New Zealand

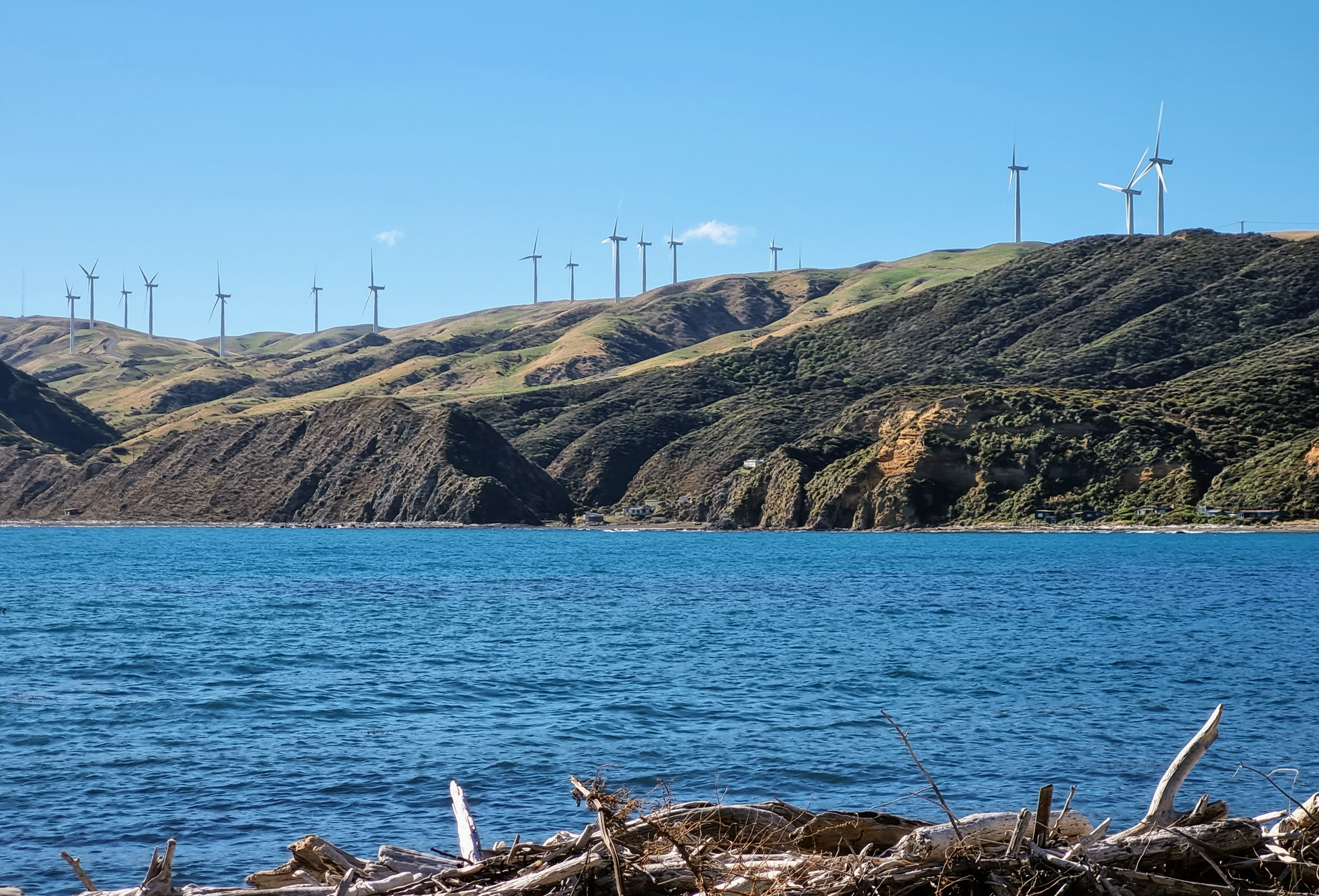
- Mill Creek Wind Farm from Ohariu Bay
- Country: New Zealand
- Location: west of Johnsonville, Wellington
- Coordinates: 41°12′44″S 174°44′20″E
- Status: Operational
- Construction began: August 2012
- Commission date: mid-2014
- Owner: Meridian Energy

Wind farm
- Type: Onshore
- Rotor diameter: 82.4 m (270 ft)

Power generation
- Units operational: 26
- Make and model: Siemens Wind Power: SWT-2.3-82 VS
- Nameplate capacity: 59.8 MW

Mill Creek Wind Farm is a wind farm in the Ohariu Valley near Wellington, New Zealand.

The wind farm is operated by Meridian Energy and has 26 wind turbines.

The application for resource consents described the project as having a total capacity of up to 71.3MW. The wind farm covers an area of approximately 18 square kilometres (7 sq mi) and was planned to use 31 Siemens 2.3MW wind turbines. A 33,000-volt power line connects the wind farm to Transpower's Wilton substation, where the farm's electricity is injected into both Wellington Electricity's local distribution network and the national grid.

The resource consents were granted in February 2009 with conditions, including a limit of 29 turbines and a maximum height of 111 m (364 ft). Local Ohariu Valley residents who opposed the development lodged an appeal to the Environment Court. In August 2011, the Environment Court approved the resource consents for the project, subject to a limit of 26 turbines.

Construction began in late 2012, and the first electricity was generated in May 2014. It became fully operational in October 2014.

== See also ==
- Wind power in New Zealand
