= Hurunui =

Hurunui may refer to:

- Hurunui District, New Zealand
- Hurunui (New Zealand electorate)
- Hurunui River, New Zealand
- Hurunui Windfarm
- Hurunui, New Zealand, a small settlement in Hurunui District by the Hurunui River
