= Mahinerangi Wind Farm =

Wind farm in New Zealand

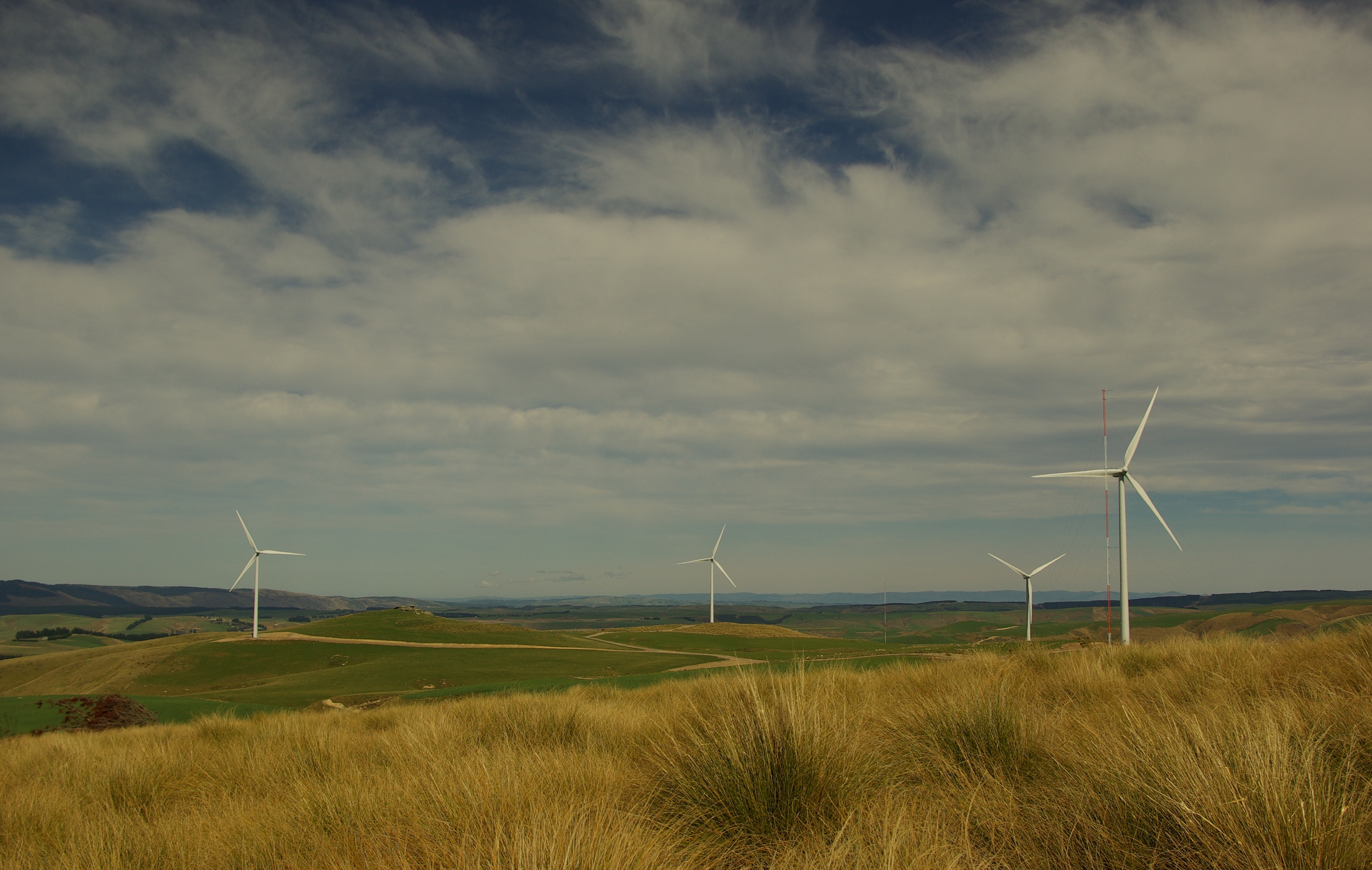
- Four of the twelve turbines at Mahinerangi Wind Farm, 2 April 2011
- Country: New Zealand
- Location: north of Lake Mahinerangi, Otago
- Coordinates: 45°45′38″S 169°54′18″E
- Status: Operational
- Construction began: September 2010
- Commission date: March 2011
- Construction cost: NZ$75 million
- Owner: Mercury NZ Ltd

Wind farm
- Type: Onshore
- Rotor diameter: 90 m (295 ft)
- Rated wind speed: 15 m/s (54 km/h; 34 mph)
- Site area: 17.23 km^{2} (6.65 sq mi)
- Site elevation: 600–730 m (1,970–2,400 ft)

Power generation
- Units operational: 12
- Make and model: Vestas: V90-3MW
- Nameplate capacity: 36 MW; Planned: 200 MW
- Annual net output: 101 GWh (stage 1)

External links
- Commons: Related media on Commons

The Mahinerangi Wind Farm is a wind farm on the north side of Lake Mahinerangi, around 50 km west of Dunedin, in Otago, New Zealand. Stage one of the wind farm, generating 36 MW, was commissioned in March 2011. An additional 160 MW is consented to be commissioned in further stages, possibly to be expanded to 190MW.

The wind farm is owned and operated by Mercury NZ Ltd. It was the second major wind farm to be built in the South Island.

== History ==
Resource consent was granted in 2007 and later confirmed after an appeal to the Environment Court.

Construction of the Stage 1 turbines began in September 2010. Vestas V90-3MW turbines were chosen for the wind farm, having previously been used for stage 3 of Tararua Wind Farm in 2007. Turbines were shipped to Port Chalmers, and trucked through Dunedin to their final site.

The wind farm generated its first electricity on 21 February 2011, with the first two turbines being commissioned. All twelve Stage 1 turbines were completed and generating electricity by the end of March 2011.

== Location ==
The wind farm is on 17.23 km^{2} (6.65 sq mi) of land at an elevation of 600 to 730 metres above sea level and about 50 kilometres west of Dunedin. Most of the land in the site is pasture grazed by sheep and cattle.

== Stage 2 ==
Stage 2 at Mahinerangi is proposed for up to 100 wind turbines producing 160MW and an annual output of over 600GWh. Resource consents were granted in 2009. In 2026, Mercury applied under the Fast Track Approvals Act to install fewer but larger turbines instead, along with a 60MW battery.

In October 2026 Mercury decided to proceed with the project, now renamed Puke Kapo Hau.

== Transmission ==
Electricity generated from Stage 1 turbines is injected into the nearby Deep Stream and Waipori hydro schemes. This uses the existing 33kV transmission line, avoiding the cost of additional transmission infrastructure. Electricity from Stage 1 and the hydro schemes is then injected into either Dunedin's local distribution network, or into Transpower's Halfway Bush-Balclutha-Gore 110 kV line at Berwick.

Stage 2 and beyond is too large to inject into the Waipori/Deep Stream system. Instead, it will inject into Transpower's Halfway Bush-Roxburgh 110 kV line, which passes a short distance south of the wind farm.

== See also ==
- Wind power in New Zealand
- Project Hayes
