= MainPower =

New Zealand electricity distribution company

- Industry: Electricity distribution
- Predecessor: North Canterbury Electric Power Board
- Founded: 1928
- Headquarters: Rangiora, New Zealand
- Key people: Tony King (Chair); Andy Lester (CE)
- Parent: MainPower Trust
- Website: www.mainpower.co.nz

MainPower New Zealand Limited is an electricity distribution company, based in Rangiora, New Zealand, responsible for electricity distribution to nearly 42,000 customers in the Canterbury region north of the Waimakariri River. MainPower was formed in 1993, after the Energy Companies Act 1992 required the North Canterbury Electric Power Board to reform into a commercial power company. More reforms in 1998 required electricity companies nationally to split their lines and retail businesses, with MainPower retaining its lines business and selling its retail business to Contact Energy.

MainPower has initiated a number of local generation projects, including the Mount Cass Wind Farm and Cleardale Hydro Power Station.

== Electricity network ==
MainPower has a total service area of 11,180 square kilometres (4,320 sq mi), covering the Waimakariri, Hurunui and Kaikōura districts. The area includes the towns of Kaiapoi, Rangiora, Oxford, Woodend, Pegasus, Amberley, Waipara, Culverden, Cheviot, Hanmer Springs and Kaikōura.

MainPower takes electricity from Transpower's national grid at five grid exit points (GXPs): Kaiapoi, Southbrook, Ashley, Waipara and Culverden. It operates 4,873 km of circuits at 66,000 and 33,000 volts for subtransmission, and 22,000 and 11,000 volts for distribution. As is standard in New Zealand, electricity is delivered to homes at 230/400 volts (phase-to-neutral/phase-to-phase).

In 2011, MainPower purchased the Kaikōura GXP and Culverden to Kaikōura 66 kV transmission line from Transpower. In 2015, MainPower completed works to up-rate the network west of Rangiora towards Oxford to 66/22 kV (from 33/11 kV). Other projects in progress include upgrading the 33 kV subtransmission line between Cheviot and Kaikōura to 66 kV, and preparing for a new "Rangora East" GXP between Rangiora and Woodend to supply Woodend and Pegasus, offloading Kaiapoi GXP.

MainPower New Zealand Limited network statistics for the year ending 31 March 2024
| Parameter | Value |
|---|---|
| Regulatory asset base | $328 million |
| Line charge revenue | $60.5 million |
| Capital expenditure | $37.3 million |
| Operating expenditure | $24.7 million |
| Customer connections | 44,918 |
| Energy delivered | 640 GWh |
| Peak demand | 117 MW |
| Total line length | 5,234 km |
| Distribution and low-voltage overhead lines | 3,668 km |
| Distribution and low-voltage underground cables | 1,191 km |
| Subtransmission lines and cables | 390 km |
| Poles | 56,430 |
| Distribution transformers | 8,493 |
| Zone substation transformers | 24 |
| Average interruption duration (SAIDI) | 937 minutes |
| Average interruption frequency (SAIFI) | 2.88 |

The high SAIDI and SAIFI in the 2023/24 years is primarily attibuted to an extreme windstorm in October 2023.

== Power stations ==
Mainpower developed the proposed Mount Cass Wind Farm, obtaining resource consent for the project in 2011. After a funding partnership with Marlborough Lines Limited fell through in 2024, Mainpower sold the project to Yinson Renewables in December 2025.

=== Operational ===
| Name | Type | Location | Capacity (MW) | Annual generation (average GWh) | Commissioned |
|---|---|---|---|---|---|
| Cleardale | Hydro | Mount Hutt | 1 | | 2010 |

=== Proposed / under construction ===
| Name | Type | Location | Projected capacity (MW) | Status |
|---|---|---|---|---|
| Thongcaster Rd | Solar | Oxford, Canterbury | 7.3 | Under construction |

== See also ==
- Electricity sector in New Zealand
