= Project Huriwaka =

Proposed wind farm in New Zealand

- Country: New Zealand
- Location: Taihape
- Coordinates: 39°31′52.02″S 175°48′25.7″E
- Status: proposed
- Owner: Manawa Energy

Power generation
- Nameplate capacity: 300 MW

Project Huriwaka is a proposed wind farm located on the Hihitahi Plateau between Waiouru and Taihape, New Zealand. The project was originally developed and consented by Meridian Energy, but the consents were allowed to lapse. In May 2023 the rights to develop the project were acquired by Manawa Energy.

== Consent process ==
Meridian Energy applied for resource consents for a 52 turbine farm generating 130 MW in 2008. The consent hearing was held in December and Horizons Regional Council granted the resource consents in February 2009. The decision was appealed to the Environment Court in September 2009 and in January 2010 the court ruled the wind farm project could proceed. The approved consent conditions limited the number of turbines to 52 and maximum blade height to 135 m. In May 2015 the resource consents were extend for five years, until 2020.

Consent for the wind farm lapsed in May and June 2020. In 2021 Meridian planned to apply for a new consent for the site.

In May 2023 Manawa Energy announced that it had secured the rights to develop the project. Renamed Project Huriwaka, it will generate 230MW. Development of the project and gaining resource consents is expected to take three years.

In October 2024 the project was included in the National government's fast-track list. The project was increased to 300MW, with construction expected to begin in 2026.

== See also ==
- Wind power in New Zealand
