= Kaiwaikawe Wind Farm =

Wind farm in New Zealand

- Country: New Zealand
- Location: Dargaville
- Coordinates: 35°52′8.6″S 173°43′50.85″E
- Status: Under construction
- Construction began: March 2025
- Construction cost: NZ$287 million
- Owner: Mercury Energy
- Operator: Mercury NZ

Power generation
- Units operational: 12
- Nameplate capacity: 77 MW

The Kaiwaikawe Wind Farm is a wind farm currently under construction in the Northland Region of New Zealand. When complete it will consist of 12 turbines with an output of 77 MW. The wind farm was initially developed by Tilt Renewables, and then by Mercury Energy following the latter's acquisition of Tilt's New Zealand assets.

Tilt applied for resource consent for the wind farm - then called Omamari - in May 2021. In July 2021 Tilt signed a 20-year agreement with Genesis Energy Limited to sell the electricity from the wind-farm, which had been renamed Kaiwaikawe.

The project was granted resource consent in March 2022. In December 2024 Mercury announced that the project would proceed, and now consisted of twelve 206-metre Vestas V162-6.4 MW turbines with a total output of 77MW. Construction began with a ground-breaking ceremony in March 2025, and the project was expected to be complete by the end of 2026.

The turbines did not arrive in Aotearoa until February 2026, and were transported to the site in night-time convoys. In March 2026 it was reported that the farm would begin power generation in mid-2026, with full completion by mid-2027.

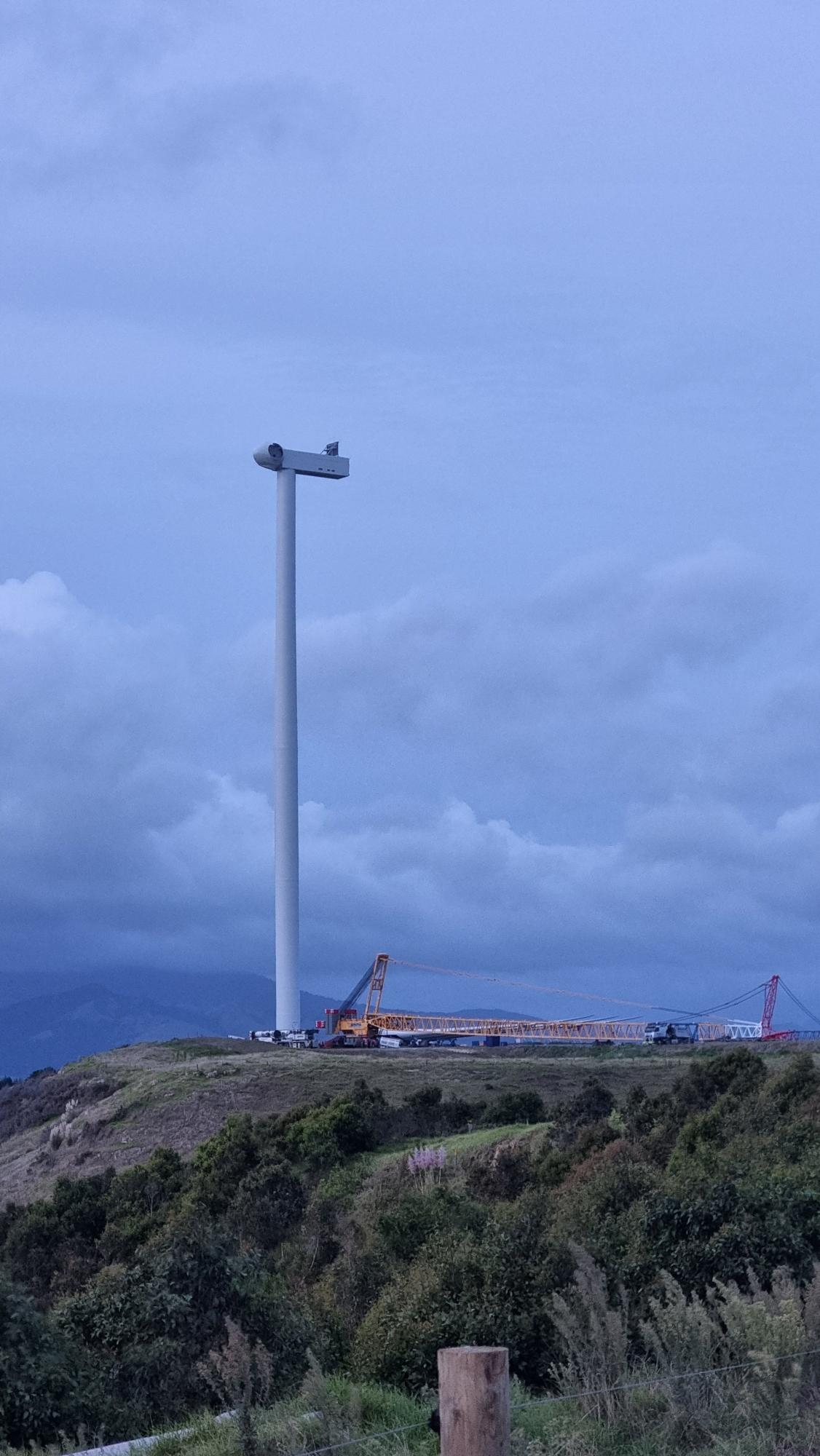
Kaiwaikawe Wind Farms first tower under construction

== Location ==
The wind farm site is located about 10 kilometres north-west of Dargaville.

== See also ==
- Wind power in New Zealand
