= Project Hurunui =

Proposed wind farm in New Zealand

Hurunui Windfarm
- Country: New Zealand
- Location: North Canterbury
- Coordinates: 42°59′33″S 172°57′32″E
- Status: Proposed; resource consent granted but has lapsed with time
- Owner: Meridian Energy

Power generation
- Units operational: 33
- Nameplate capacity: 76 MW

Project Hurunui is a proposed wind farm located between Omihi and Greta Valley in north Canterbury, New Zealand. Meridian Energy proposed the wind farm; in 2013 it received resource consent from the Environment Court, though this consent lapsed in 2023.

== History ==
The proposal as of 2011 was for a wind farm of 33 turbines, with maximum height of 130.5 metres, located on a 34 km^{2} area on the east side of State Highway 1.

Meridian Energy began consultations on the project in April 2010. An informal survey of residents in the affected area showed that slightly more were in favour of the wind farm than those who were opposed.

The application for consents was lodged in February 2011, and notified in April 2011. In June 2011, the Hurunui District Council and the Canterbury Regional Council agreed to a request by Meridian that the wind farm proposal be referred to the Environment Court. Consent was granted by the Environment Court in April 2013, though one of the conditions was that the consent lapsed if "not given effect to within ten years".

In February 2021 Meridian said that the company wanted to see more demand in the South Island before developing more generation there. which is planned to produce up to 75.9 MW from 2014.

As of 2024, the Hurunui project does not appear in Meridian's webpage of projects.

== See also ==
- Wind power in New Zealand
