= Southland Wind Farm =

Proposed wind farm in New Zealand

- Country: New Zealand
- Location: Wyndham Southland
- Coordinates: 46°21′04″S 169°04′06″E
- Status: Proposed
- Owner: Contact Energy

Wind farm
- Type: Onshore wind farm
- Hub height: up to 135m
- Rotor diameter: up to 170m
- Site elevation: 380m to 630m

Power generation
- Annual net output: 900-1200GWh

The Southland Wind Farm, also referred to as the Slopedown Wind Farm, is a proposed wind farm near Wyndham in the Southland district of New Zealand. If built it would be the largest wind farm in New Zealand. A wind farm on this site was first proposed in 2008, but did not progress. The idea was revived in 2023 by Contact Energy. The current proposal is for 55 turbines.

The project's application for resource consent was opposed by some nearby residents. The application was initially declined in March 2025, with the decision-making Panel judging that the project's economic and social benefits did not justify its adverse effects such as impacts on birds, bats, and lizards.

Consent was granted in April 2026, after the Minister for Infrastructure referred Contact Energy's application to an Expert Panel under the Fast-track Approvals Act 2024.

== Proposal ==
The 2023 version of the proposal, by Contact Energy, was for 55 turbines that are 220 metres base to tip, with a total maximum generation of 300MW. The site of the project is about 5,500 hectares sitting about 15 km east of Wyndham. Contact Energy stated the project would take two and a half years to install and another 12 months for 'site rehabilitation', and that it would have 160-240 jobs during construction and 10-14 jobs once operational.

If the site is built out to the proposed 300MW it would be the largest wind farm in the country ahead of today's largest, the 222MW Turitea Wind Farm. Other proposals for similar or larger wind farms exist, such as the Kaihiku Wind Farm which would also be in the Catlins and is also proposed to be 300MW.

Whether the project goes ahead may be tied to the future of the Tiwai Point Aluminium Smelter. This smelter uses 13% of New Zealand's electricity, and has been considering closing subject to power price negotiations. If it did, Southland would have a large surplus of electricity generation and this could affect the viability of the Southland Wind Farm. However, Contact Energy have also said that power demand in Southland is growing, and if Fonterra's plants were electrified this would consume "quite a significant chunk" of the wind farm's generation.

== History ==
=== Original proposal by Wind Prospect and Genesis ===
The project was originally proposed by Wind Prospect CWP (NZ) Ltd in 2008. Wind Prospect's initial proposal was for a 150MW wind farm (50 turbines of 3MW each). The project was purchased by Genesis Energy Limited in June 2010. But by 2011 Genesis said the project was not a priority as the company focused its attention elsewhere, such as a wind farm in Wairarapa. The project had already attracted opposition, such as from the West Catlins Preservation Society which had concerns about the visual impact.

=== Revived proposal by Contact Energy ===
In 2023 the proposal was revived by Contact Energy. It would be Contact's first wind power station. This new version initially proposed 50 turbines, later increased to 55. Contact said that if approved, construction would start in 2025. The project was initially estimated to cost $700 m to $900 m, though by November 2023 this was revised to $1 billion.

=== Opposition ===
The proposal faces opposition by the West Catlins Preservation Society. Members have stated that the project would visually impact the area, and affect the environment and wildlife. They have also questioned the need for more power generation in the province, and suggested that if more power is needed that hydroelectric stations would be preferable. A petition against the project received at least 200 signatures. Part of the wind farm site has been identified as an "outstanding natural landscape" in a report commissioned by four Southland councils in 2018 and finalised in 2019. There are currently 30 dwellings within 5 km of the proposed wind farm.

=== Resource consent application ===
In July 2023 the project was accepted for fast-tracking towards resource consent approval under the COVID-19 Recovery (Fast-track Consenting) Act 2020. Contact Energy lodged a resource consent application with the Environmental Protection Authority (EPA) in December 2023. The laws creating the fast-track process have since been repealed but Contact's application was filed in time to use it. The fast-track process gives the decision to an expert consenting panel, chaired by Clare Leniham, a former environmental and public law barrister. The EPA provided advice and administrative support to the panel.

The Southland District Council opposed the use of the fast-track process because it blocks the general public from the resource consent process. However, the panel was still required under the law to invite written comments on the application from certain groups. The panel invited people and entities such as the West Catlins Preservation Society, all adjacent landowners, multiple district and regional councils, Te Rūnanga o Ngāi Tahu, and multiple government ministers. Comments were required by 25 July 2024 and were published shortly after that. The EPA also sought more information from Contact Energy on multiple occasions, such as light spill distances, dwellings near the wind farm, and why Contact did not prepare management plans in consultation with Te Ao Mārama Inc, the iwi liaison entity for Southland's four rūnanga.

In August 2024, after public feedback was published, the consent application was paused at Contact Energy's request. Contact requested the pause so it could address the matters raised "and where necessary, work through issues with commenters". In December 2024, the consenting panel produced a minute which said there were "what appear to be insurmountable difficulties" between opponents and Contact Energy, such as on wetland protection, lizards, invertebrates, landscape and amenity.

Contact Energy intended, as part of the proposal, to create a community fund valued at $2.8 million over the 35 years of the project’s lifetime. The West Catlins Preservation Society said that this fund was not substantial, with a spokesperson saying no amount would be enough to cover the harm done. The resource consenting panel agreed that the proposed fund was not a substantial fund for the community "given their feedback about the long-term adverse effects... and the expected profit [to Contact]". In December 2024, Contact said it was willing to increase the fund to $3.78 million.

The Panel deferred its decision from December 2024 to March 2025, eventually declining the consent on 18 March 2025. Contact Energy announced an appeal nine days later, and re-applied under the Fast Track Consenting Act. The application was later referred to an Expert Panel under the Fast-track Approvals Act 2024.

The Fast Track Panel formally approved a consent for the wind farm to proceed in April 2026.

Shortly after, Contact Energy announced an agreement with Rio Tinto to sell 50MW of the wind farm's output to power the reopening of Tiwai Point's Line 4 potline.

== See also ==
- Wind power in New Zealand
