= Te Āpiti Wind Farm =

Wind farm in New Zealand

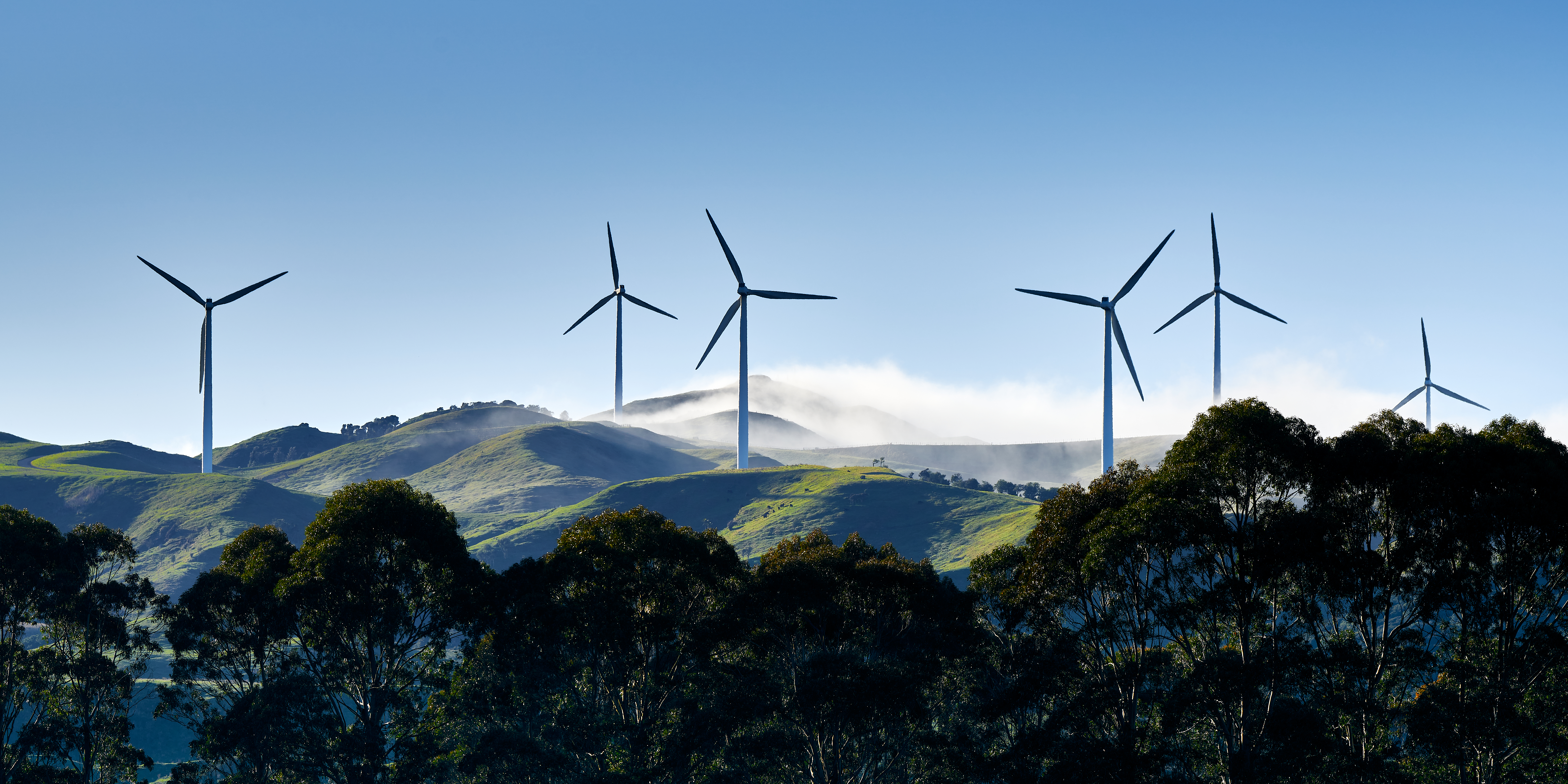
- Te Āpiti Wind Farm viewed from Ashhurst Domain, 2020
- Country: New Zealand
- Location: Ruahine Ranges, north-east of Palmerston North, Manawatū-Whanganui
- Coordinates: 40°17′46″S 175°48′30″E
- Status: Operational
- Construction began: November 2003
- Commission date: December 2004
- Owner: Meridian Energy
- Operator: Meridian Energy

Wind farm
- Type: Onshore
- Hub height: 70 m (230 ft)
- Rotor diameter: 72 m (236 ft)
- Site area: 11.5 km^{2} (4.44 sq mi)

Power generation
- Units operational: 55
- Make and model: Vestas:vNM72-1.65MW
- Nameplate capacity: 90.75 MW
- Capacity factor: 32.4%
- Annual net output: 258 GWh

External links
- Website: Te Āpiti Wind Farm - Meridian Energy
- Commons: Related media on Commons

Te Āpiti is a wind farm owned and operated by Meridian Energy. It is located on 11.5 km^{2} of land north of the Manawatū Gorge in the North Island of New Zealand. At 90.75 MW, it was New Zealand's largest capacity wind farm until September 2007, when the third stage of the nearby Tararua Wind Farm was completed.

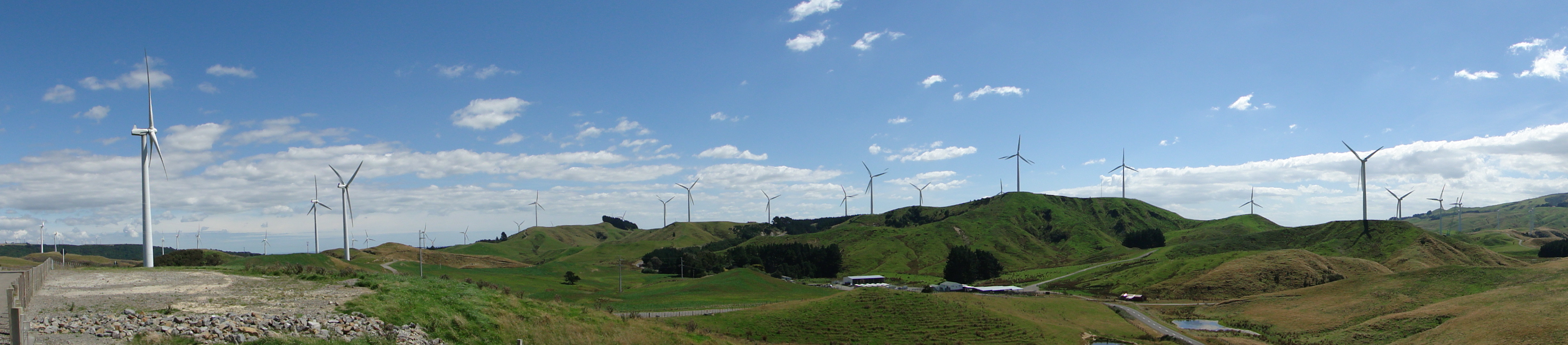

The $100 million wind farm consists of 55 separate turbines capable of generating 1.65 MW each, representing a total capacity of 90.75 MW. Each turbine is atop a 70-metre-high (230 ft) tower. It is fitted with 3 blades each 35 metres in length.

In 2024 the wind farm reached the end of its original operating life. Meridian contracted the manufacturer Vestas to conduct an End-of-Life (EOL) study to see if its life can be extended, and has been for an additional 10 years. Life extensions relatively low cost compared to repowering, with power generation continuing as before, giving a high return.

== Location ==
The site near the Manawatū Gorge area is ideal for wind farms. The Tararua and Ruahine Ranges provide a barrier to the predominantly westerly winds that flow across New Zealand. Between the two ranges lies a lower range of hills that serve to funnel the wind. TrustPower, another New Zealand electricity generator and retailer, operates a wind farm on the south side of the Manawatū Gorge.

== Carbon offsets ==
The Te Āpiti wind farm is also a carbon offset project. In 2005 the British bank HSBC purchased 125,000 tonnes worth of carbon credits from Meridian generated by the wind farm. Meridian Energy also sold the Dutch government 530,000 tonnes of carbon credits from Te Āpiti. The price per tonne was considered to be about $10.40 a tonne. In both cases, the carbon credits for Te Āpiti were from New Zealand's Assigned amount units allocated under the Kyoto Protocol. The New Zealand Government granted the AAUs to Meridian Energy as an incentive for carbon neutral power development under the Projects to Reduce Emissions programme (or PRE).

As of 2007, installed capacity of wind turbines in New Zealand has reached 321 MW and a further 46.5 MW is under construction.

== Transmission ==
Te Āpiti was the first wind farm in New Zealand to connect directly to Transpower's national grid. Previously constructed windfarms, including Hau Nui and Tararua, connected to the national grid via local distribution and sub-transmission lines.

Electricity from the 55 turbines is sent via a 48-kilometre (30 mi) network of underground cables to the Te Āpiti substation near the lookout, where the electricity is stepped-up to 110 kV for transmission. A 4.5-kilometre (2.8 mi) single-circuit transmission line connects the wind farm to the national grid at Transpower's Woodville substation.

== Virtual field trip ==
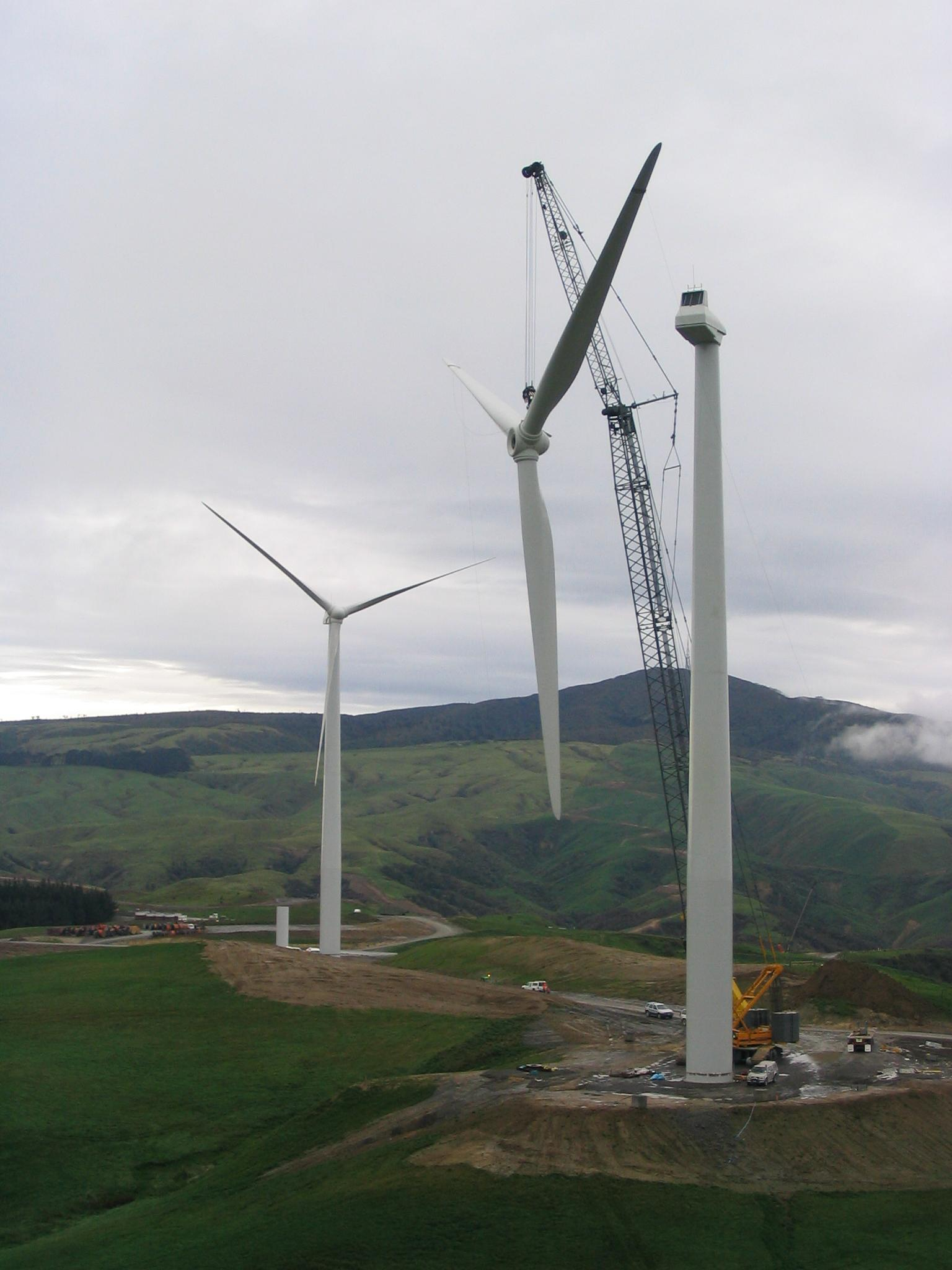
Construction of the Te Āpiti wind farm

The New Zealand online education programme, LEARNZ, conducted a virtual field trip to Te Āpiti Wind Farm in April 2008. Over 1500 New Zealand school students joined LEARNZ teacher Darren on this trip. Telephone conferences were held between students and wind farm staff. Two telephone conferences were held while Darren and Meridian staff were on top of a 70m high wind turbine.

== See also ==
- Te Rere Hau Wind Farm
- Wind farm
- Wind power in New Zealand
