= Marlborough Lines Limited =

Electricity distribution company based in Blenheim, New Zealand

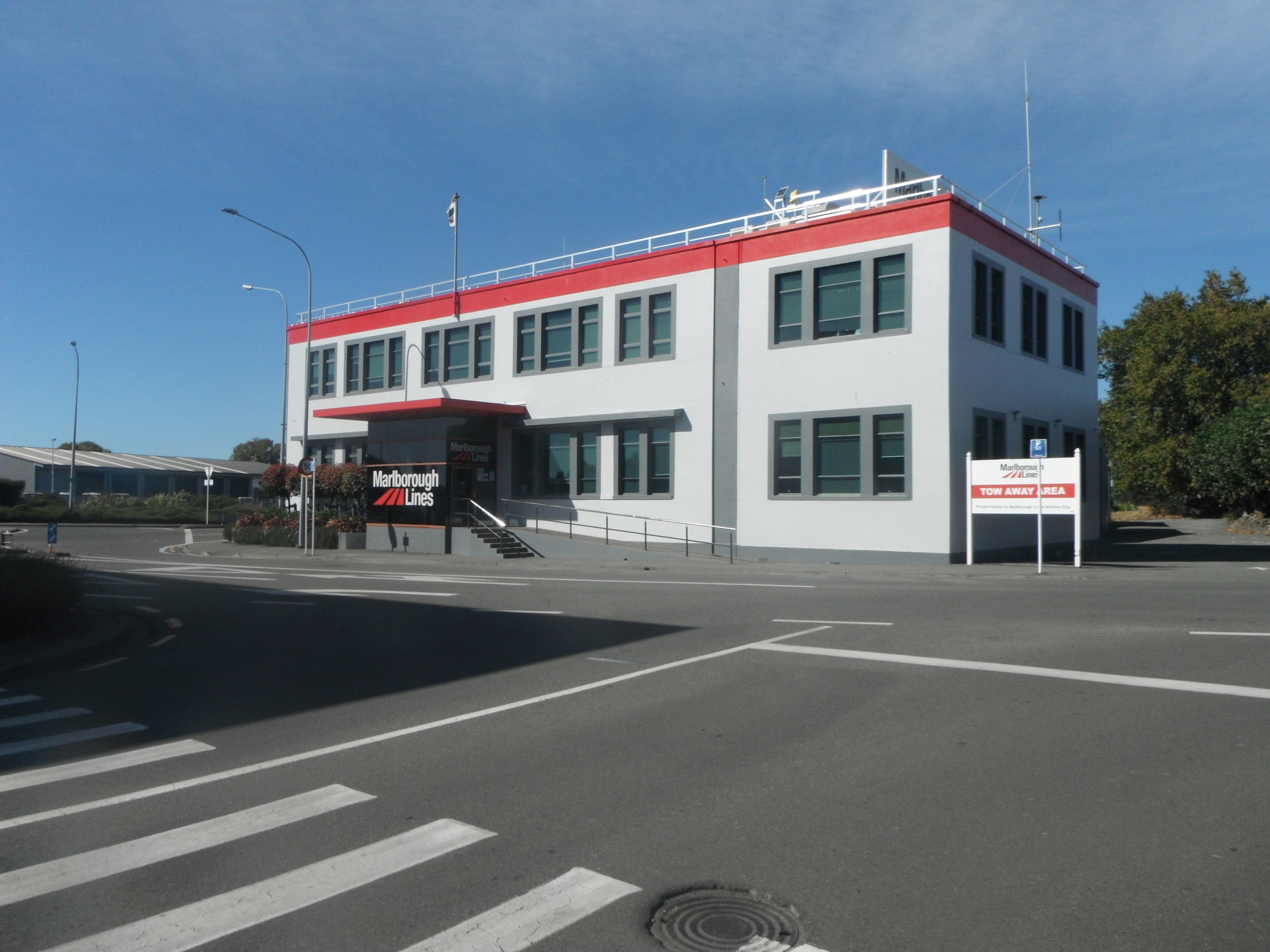
- Marlborough Lines' head office in central Blenheim
- Industry: Electricity distribution
- Predecessor: Marlborough Electric Power Board
- Founded: 1923
- Headquarters: Blenheim, New Zealand
- Key people: Phil Robinson (Chair); Tim Cosgrove (Chief Executive)
- Revenue: $46 M (Network) (2021)
- Owner: Marlborough Electric Power Trust
- Number of employees: 150
- Website: www.marlboroughlines.co.nz/Home

Marlborough Lines Limited (Marlborough Lines) is an electricity distribution company, based in Blenheim, New Zealand. Marlborough Lines is responsible for subtransmission and distribution of electricity to approximately 26,000 customers in the Marlborough Region over a service area of 11,330 km^{2} (4,370 sq mi). The network includes approximately 3,400 km (2,100 mi) of power lines extending to some very isolated areas across the region, including the extremities of the Marlborough Sounds, which can only be reached by boat or helicopter.

Marlborough Lines was established in October 1923 as the Marlborough Electric Power Board (MEPB), a combined electricity generator, distributor and retailer. It supplied its first electricity in August 1927, generated from the Waihopai dam and later supplemented by diesel generators at Springlands. The MEPB was connected to the Cobb power station in 1945 and onwards to the rest of the South Island transmission system in 1955. In 1993, the Power Board was corporatised to become Marlborough Electric. Following the 1998 electricity sector reforms, Marlborough Electric sold its generation and retail business to Trustpower, keeping the distribution network business and becoming Marlborough Lines.

== Ownership and management ==
The company is 100% owned by the Marlborough Electric Power Trust on behalf of electricity users in the Marlborough region.

Marlborough Lines has a 50% shareholding in Nelson Electricity, the distribution company that serves Nelson city.

Marlborough Lines was previously a majority shareholder in OtagoNet, the lines business supplying most of rural Otago, but sold their 51% shareholding in September 2014 for $153 million.

In September 2019, it was announced that Managing Director Ken Forrest, who had been with the company for 39 years, was to retire at the end of the year. On 10 January 2020, the chair of the board announced that Tim Cosgrove had been appointed as the new chief executive, to commence in early April.

=== Regulation ===
As a natural monopoly lines business, Marlborough Lines is subject to regulation under the Commerce Act 1986. However, as Marlborough Lines is 100% owned by a consumer trust, it is not subject to price-quality regulation, but is subject to Information Disclosure regulation. The Commerce Commission publishes a wide range of Information Disclosure data provided by Marlborough Lines.

== History ==
=== Establishment ===
The Marlborough Electric Power Board (MEPB) was gazetted on 25 October 1923, with the responsibility to supply Blenheim borough, Marlborough and Awatere counties with electricity. The eight-member board was elected on 24 November 1923 and first met on 11 December 1923. The Havelock Town Board and Picton Borough Council had set up their own electricity supplies in 1917 and joined the MEPB in 1926 and 1947 respectively.

Engineers considered multiple sources of generation for the MEPB, before deciding on a one-megawatt hydroelectric station on the Waihopai River, 40 km (25 mi) southwest of Blenheim. A £300,000 loan to construct the power station, transmission and distribution infrastructure and the wiring of consumer's premises was approved by ratepayers on 11 October 1924. The first contracts for construction were let on 29 June 1925.

The MEPB supplied its first electricity on 6 August 1927 following the commissioning of the Waihopai dam Electricity from the dam was transmitted at 33,000 volts to substations at Renwick, Springlands (for Blenheim), and Seddon, where it was stepped down to 6,600 volts in Blenheim and 11,000 volts in other areas for distribution. From the outset, the MEPB used the 230/400 V 50 Hz three-phase alternating current system which had been made the national standard in 1920.

=== Expansion ===
To supplement the supply from Waihopai, the MEPB commissioned a 430 kW diesel generator set at Springlands in 1930. A 900 kW diesel generator set was added in 1937. In January 1945, a transmission line from Springlands to Stoke was completed, connecting the MEPB to Nelson and onward to the Cobb Power Station.

Picton was the last town to join the MEPB in 1947. At the time, the town still used a direct-current system, which required the MEPB to re-reticulate the town and convert consumers' appliances for alternating current. The reticulation and conversion cost £14,460, in addition to the £14,000 cost of constructing a 33,000-volt line from Springlands to Picton. The changeover was completed in November 1950.

The Nelson-Marlborough regional grid was isolated and operated independently of the rest of the South Island grid until 1955, when a transmission line was completed from Kiwiwa (near Saint Arnaud) to Inangahua, linking the region to the rest of the island via the West Coast. The interconnection was further reinforced in 1958 with the completion of a direct 220,000-volt transmission line between the Islington substation in Christchurch and Kikiwa.

Reticulation into the Marlborough Sounds began in 1969. D'Urville Island was connected to the MEPB network in 1975 via an 11,000-volt line spanning 1,020 m (3,350 ft) across French Pass, while Arapaoa Island was connected in 1982, supplied via an 11,000-volt line spanning 2,029 m (6,657 ft) across Tory Channel. The Tory Channel span gain notoriety in October 1985 when it was struck by an Air Albatross Cessna 402, resulting in the death of eight of the nine people on board.

=== Reorganisation ===
In 1992, the passing of the Energy Companies Act required that the various franchised electricity distribution and retailing organisations then operating in New Zealand become commercial power companies with a responsibility to operate as a successful business and have regard to the efficient utilisation of energy. The Marlborough Electric Power Board then became Marlborough Electric – one of 35 integrated electricity businesses around New Zealand. At that time Marlborough Electric was one of a small number of electricity companies who also operated their own generation business, and produced some 26% of Marlborough's electricity requirement.

The Electricity Industry Reform Act was passed in 1998, and this required that all electricity companies be split into either the lines (network) business or the supply business (generating and/or selling electricity) by 1 April 1999. The generation and retail businesses of Marlborough Electric were sold to TrustPower, and from April 1999 Marlborough Lines was established to focus on the operation and maintenance of the distribution lines network.

== Network ==
The Marlborough Lines distribution network consists of approximately 3,500 km of lines, supplying approximately 26,800 customers across the Marlborough District as well as in the northern Kaikōura District as far south as Waipapa Bay. Towns covered by the network include Blenheim, Picton, Renwick, Seddon and Havelock.

The Marlborough Lines network connects to the national grid via a grid exit point at Transpower's Blenheim substation, located on Old Renwick Road in Springlands, Blenheim. (41.4987°S 173.9325°E) The Blenheim substation is supplied by three separate Transpower 110 kV circuits, one from Kikiwa (around 10 km north of Saint Arnaud) and two from Stoke.

The subtransmission network is made up of 308 km (191 mi) of 33 kV lines and cables interconnecting the Blenheim grid exit point with sixteen zone substations. The zone substations step the voltage down to 11 kV to supply 1,804 km (1,121 mi) of distribution lines and cables and 536 km (333 mi) of single-wire earth return lines which in turn feed 3,988 distribution transformers. The distribution transformers step the voltage down to 230/400 volts to feed customers via 871 km (541 mi) of low-voltage lines and cables.

As of 2024, Marlborough Lines is planning to extend the 33 kV subtransmission network down the Wairau Valley to a new zone substation 3 to 5 km (2 to 3 mi) west of Wairau Valley township. Vineyard growth in the Wairau Valley has resulted in the existing 11 kV distribution lines reaching capacity, with vineyards having to use diesel-powered pumps for irrigation.

=== Network statistics ===
Marlborough Lines Limited network statistics for the year ending 31 March 2024
Parameter	Value
Parameter	2024
Regulatory asset base	$279 million
Line charge revenue	$42.0 million
Capital expenditure	$17.1 million
Operating expenditure	$22.1 million
Customer connections	27,034
Energy delivered	401 GWh
Peak demand	74 MW
Total line length	3,539 km
Distribution and low-voltage overhead lines	2,541 km
Distribution and low-voltage underground cables	617 km
Subtransmission lines and cables	309 km
Poles	31,034
Distribution transformers	4,095
Zone substation transformers	31
Average interruption duration (SAIDI)	181 minutes
Average interruption frequency (SAIFI)	2.33

== Power stations ==
In 2021 the company established a subsidiary, Energy Marlborough, with the goal of having 50MW of renewable generation by 2030. In 2025 it acquired the Lulworth and Weld Cone wind farms near Ward from Energy3.

In 2023 Energy Marlborough entered a partnership with MainPower to build the Mount Cass Wind Farm. Marlborough Lines refused further funding for the project in 2024.

=== Operational ===
Name	Type	Location	Capacity (MW)	Annual generation (average GWh)	Commissioned
Lulworth	Wind	Ward, Marlborough	1		2011
Seaview Solar Farm	Solar	Seddon, Marlborough	4		2024
Taylor Pass	Solar	Blenheim, New Zealand, Marlborough	0.85		2023
Ward Solar Farm	Solar	Ward, Marlborough	9		2025
Weld Cone	Wind	Ward, Marlborough	0.75		2010

=== Heritage diesel generators ===
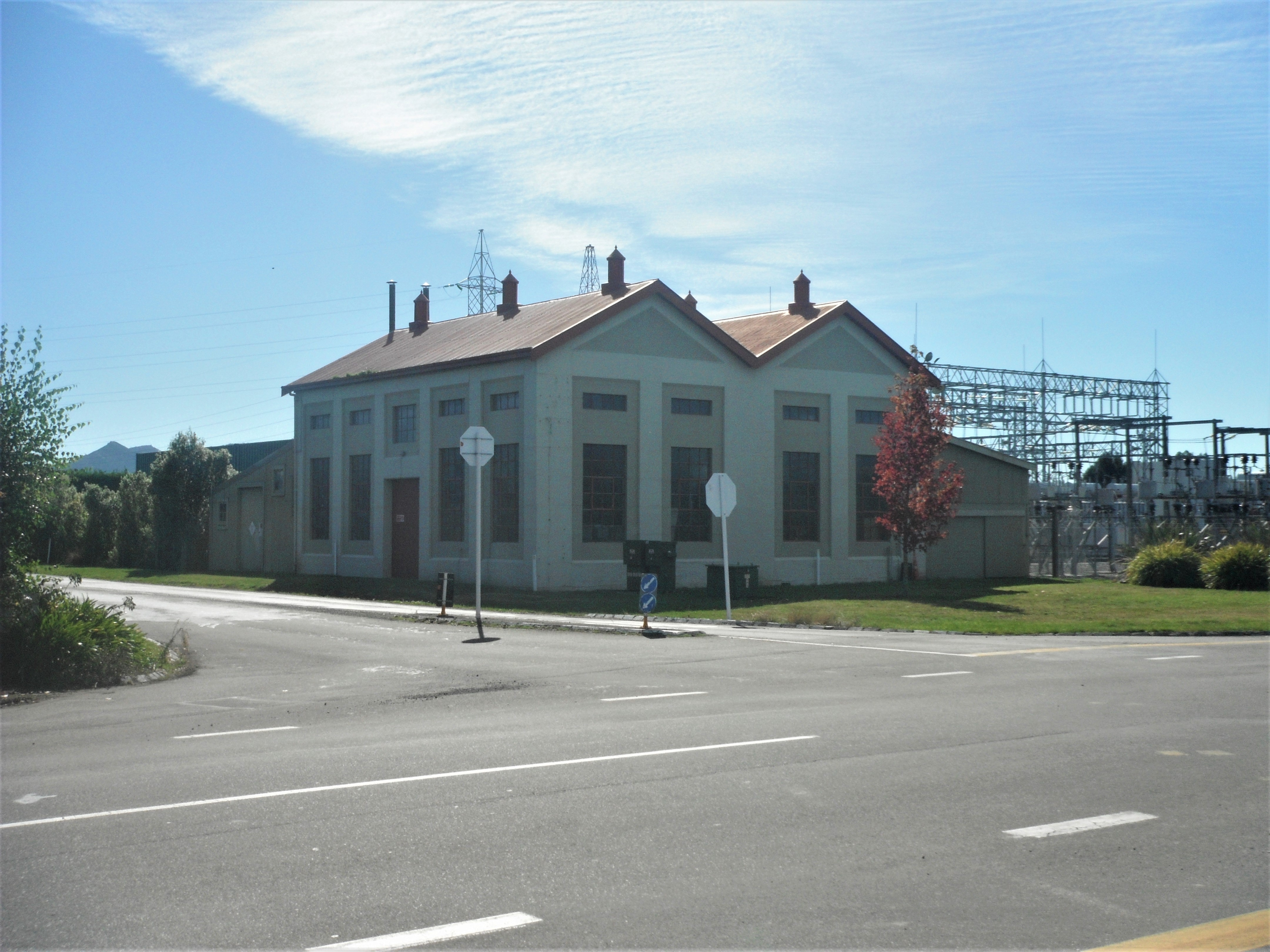
The Springlands diesel station in April 2021. Transpower's Blenheim substation can be seen behind the station.

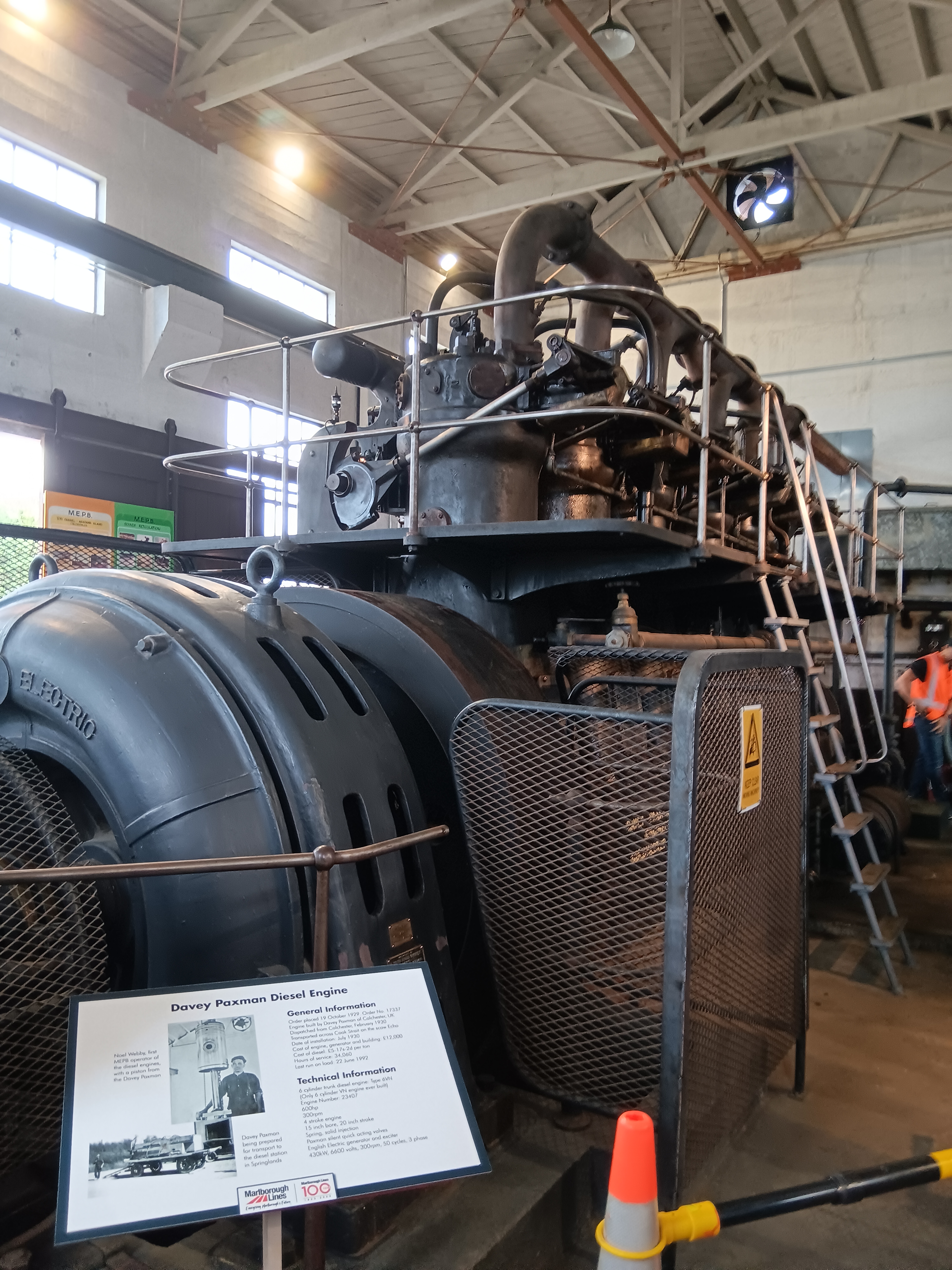
The Davey Paxman 6VN diesel generator in April 2024.

The supply of electricity to Marlborough was initially dependent on a small hydro station at Waihopai. In 1930, a diesel generator was established at Springlands in Blenheim to provide backup power when hydrogeneration was not available. The Davey Paxman 6VN diesel engine and generator output 430 kW of electricity; it was the only six-cylinder VN engine ever built and is the only VN engine still in working order.

A further diesel generator set, a 900 kW Harland & Wolff set, was installed in 1937. After Marlborough was connected to the rest of the South Island grid in 1955, the need for the generators was greatly reduced and they were relegated to reserve use. They were last used for generation on 22 June 1992, during that year's nationwide power shortages.

The generators have been preserved by Marlborough Lines as part of the engineering heritage of electricity supply in the region.

== Purchase of Yealands Wine Group ==
In 2015, Marlborough Lines purchased an 80% shareholding in a local vineyard, Yealands Wine Group, for $89 million. The sale allowed owner Peter Yealands to retain 15 per cent of the company he founded in 2008. Critics questioned whether an electricity lines company, as a regulated natural monopoly, had the skills required to produce, process and market wine internationally in a competitive and high risk industry. The managing director of Marlborough Lines, Ken Forrest said the Marlborough public will get a return better than if the cash remained in the bank.

On 2 July 2018, a subsidiary of Marlborough Lines acquired the last 14 per cent of Yealands Wine Group it did not already own from an entity controlled by Peter Yealands. On the same day, Peter Yealands quit as a director of Yealands Wine Group. Months after he quit the company, a suppression order lifted, revealing Peter Yealands had been prosecuted along with two former senior staff for covering up the addition of sugar to post-fermentation wine that was destined for Europe. In November 2018, Peter Yealands appeared at the Blenheim District Court to face charges related to the falsification of records and export certification documents over the period 2012–2015, and Yealands Estate Wines was subsequently fined $400,000. Months earlier, Marlborough Lines reached a settlement under which it agreed not to sue Yealands, even though Marlborough Lines says Peter Yealands did not tell it about the false statements before it paid $85 million for control of the company. The settlement also saw Peter Yealands paid $23 million for his remaining shares in the company.

At the annual reporting meeting of the Marlborough Electric Power Trust in December 2021, there was controversy about the investment in Yealands because it had not paid a normal dividend for two years. In August 2022, Marlborough Lines announced that it was looking to divest part of its holdings in the Yealands group, in order to fund renewable energy developments and meet expected new electricity demand. Marlborough Lines was still trying to sell a stake in Yealands in late 2023, and faced controversy over the poor financial performance of the wine company. In the 2024 elections for the members of the Marlborough Electric Power Trust, three candidates who had campaigned on issues associated with Yealands were successful, deposing the current chairperson. In November 2024, Marlborough Lines stated that the Yealands Wine Group had recorded a $19 million loss in the previous financial year, and that it was no longer on the market.

== Sponsorship ==
Marlborough Lines is the principal sponsor of a Sports and Events Centre known as Marlborough Lines Stadium 2000. The stadium is adjacent to the Marlborough District Council's existing Aquatic Centre in central Blenheim. The company also sponsors a science and technology fair in Marlborough. In 2024, the company became the naming rights sponsor of the Omaka Classic Fighters Airshow for 2025, 2027 and 2029.

== Subsidiaries ==
- Seaview Capital Limited (investment holding company)
- Yealands Wine Group Limited

== See also ==
- Electricity sector in New Zealand
- Yealands Estate
