= Puketiro Wind Farm =

Proposed wind farm in Porirua, New Zealand

- Country: New Zealand
- Location: Pāuatahanui
- Coordinates: 41.053373°S 174.937723°E
- Status: Proposed
- Owner: RES

Power generation
- Units operational: 40
- Nameplate capacity: 130MW

The Puketiro Wind Farm was a renewable energy project proposed for land owned by the Greater Wellington Regional Council (GWRC) in the Puketiro Forest near Pāuatahanui, north of Wellington, New Zealand. However, the project did not subsequently proceed.

The project was originally proposed by the Greater Wellington Regional Council (GWRC) in June 2005. After a tender process in 2006, RES NZ Ltd was selected to develop the project.

It was planned for approximately 40 wind turbines with a capacity of up to 130 MW. Wide public consultation was undertaken during early development of the project. 1300 submissions were received, with over 90% in favour. Nonetheless, a group of residents (Pauatahanui Futures Society Inc.) sought an injunction in May 2008 to stop the wind farm from proceeding. In September 2008 the GWRC withdrew permission for the three turbines that were to be installed in Battle Hill Farm Forest Park, and subsequently banned all turbines from the park. As of June 2011 the project was not expected to proceed.

The New Zealand Ministry for Culture and Heritage gives a translation of "view from the hill" for Puketiro.

== See also ==
- Wind power in New Zealand
- Electricity sector in New Zealand
- List of power stations in New Zealand
