= Yealands Estate =

New Zealand winery based in Marlborough

- Location: Seddon, New Zealand
- Coordinates: 41.648611°S 174.131526°E
- Wine region: Marlborough
- Founded: 2008; 18 years ago
- Varietals: Sauvignon Blanc, Pinot Noir, Chardonnay, Pinot Gris
- Tasting: Open to the public
- Website: https://www.yealands.co.nz

Yealands Estate is a winery based in the Marlborough wine region of New Zealand, originally established in 2008 by entrepreneur Peter Yealands. In 2018, it was taken over by Marlborough Lines, a community-owned power company. Yealands also produces the labels Babydoll and The Crossings.

== History ==
The winery was founded in 2008 by Peter Yealands on a large block of coastal land east of Seddon. The winery expanded its vineyard holdings to over 1,000 hectares (2,500 acres) in the Awatere Valley and purchased The Crossings, a Marlborough winery, and the Hawke's Bay-based winery Crossroads in 2011.

In 2016, Yealands sold its Crossroads winery facility and land and moved to transport its Hawke's Bay grapes to its Marlborough winery. In 2020, it won the Best in Show trophy for its Sauvignon Blanc wines.

=== Export offence conviction ===
After an investigation by the Ministry for Primary Industries, Yealands and two other staff were sentenced in 2018 under New Zealand's Wine Act 2003 for illegally adding sugar to wine exported to the European Union between 2013 and 2015 and falsifying records to conceal the activity. Marlborough Lines, who had already purchased a controlling stake in 2015, agreed not to sue Yealands in return for his resignation and remaining shares.

In December 2020, Yealands sold 187 hectares (460 acres) of vineyards to the New Zealand Superannuation Fund, the government-owned sovereign wealth fund, to reduce debt after the recessional economic impacts of the COVID-19 pandemic.

== Practices ==
The winery practices include using sheep and chickens to control weeds and pests, establishing wetlands, and using recycled materials for glass bottles and packaging. The 412 kW photovoltaic solar cell system installed at the winery was at the time the largest single solar array in New Zealand.

The winery ran into trouble with its waste reuse initiative to process pomace into feedstock, receiving penalties for subsequent pollution of a local waterway. The winery has planned to reduce its carbon emissions by 50 percent by 2030 and 80 percent by 2045.

Yealands also produces wine under the labels Babydoll and The Crossings.

== See also ==
- New Zealand wine
