= Arc Innovations =

Energy company owned by Vector Limited

Vector Metering
- Industry: Electricity generation Electricity retailing
- Founded: 2003
- Headquarters: Auckland, New Zealand

Vector Metering started as a subsidiary of Meridian Energy. Launched in 2003, operating under the business name; Arc Innovations. It was established to develop and deploy electricity meters using advanced meter infrastructure. In 2014, Vector Limited was granted clearance to buy Arc Innovations from the Commerce Commission from Meridian Energy with the sale completed for an undisclosed price on 1 December 2014. As of 2022, & subject to commerce commission approval, Vector has sold 50% of Vector Metering to Queensland Investment Centre (QIC) for 1.7B. Arc Innovations was the first company to introduce Smart Meters in New Zealand, rolling out the country’s pilot Smart Meter program in Central Hawkes Bay in 2005. Arc Innovation’s smart meter network relies on a mix of GPRS, RF Mesh network and satellite for the meter’s two-way communication.

== History ==
Following Arc Innovation’s launch in 2003 the company spent two years researching and developing smart meters. The introduction of this first generation of smart meters saw 6,000 meters installed in Central Hawkes Bay over 2005 and 2006. Following this, 125,000 smart meters were deployed to the wider Christchurch area.

In 2009, approximately 70% of Christchurch homes were installed with smart meters, making it the largest smart metering network in Australasia at that time.

== Christchurch earthquake ==
Following the two major earthquakes in September 2010 and February 2011, smart meters in Christchurch were able to be used to provide information to the city’s distribution network about power outages to individual homes.

Christchurch’s smart meter infrastructure was also used to switch on hot water cylinders in several hundred homes following the February earthquake.
