= Little River (New Zealand river) =

River in New Zealand

Coordinates: 43°26′55″S 171°36′10″E

Location
- Country: New Zealand

Physical characteristics
- Source
  - location: Mount Hutt
- Mouth
  - location: Rakaia River
  - elevation: 314 m (1,030 ft)
- Length: 7 km (4.3 mi)

The Little River is a tributary of Rakaia River, about 7 km (4.3 mi) long, in the Canterbury Plains of New Zealand's South Island. It rises on the 2,185 m (7,169 ft) Mount Hutt and enters the Rakaia 314 m (1,030 ft) above sea level.

Little River is also the name of a short river, roughly 2 km (1.2 mi), on Stewart Island, about a 2-hour walk from Oban.

== Power station ==
MainPower’s Cleardale power station, was built in 2010. It takes up to 450 L (99 imp gal; 120 US gal)/second through a fibreglass penstock, 2.3 km (1.4 mi) up from, and 300 m (980 ft) above, the station, to drive a 1 MW (1,300 hp) pelton wheel. Power is generated at 400 volts and transformed to feed into Electricity Ashburton's 11 kV network. Some water from the tailrace is used to irrigate 208 ha (510 acres), with the remainder returned to the river. The power station and penstock have been landscaped and are now barely visible.
