= Wind power in New Zealand =

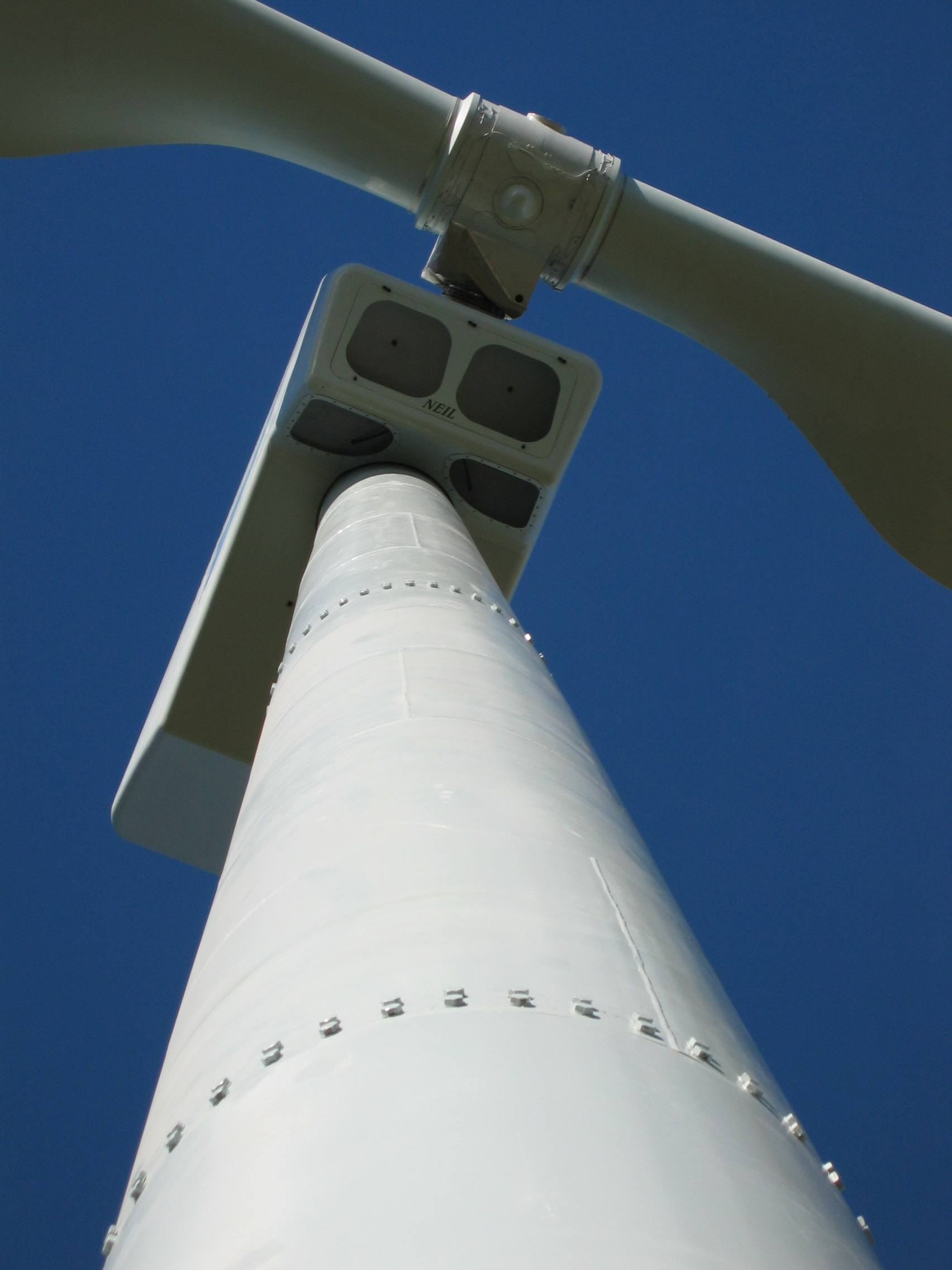
The Windflow 500 is New Zealand's only locally designed and manufactured wind turbine.

Wind power constitutes a small but growing proportion of New Zealand's electricity. As of November 2023, wind power accounts for 1,059 MW of installed capacity and over 6 percent of electricity generated in the country.

New Zealand has abundant wind resources. The country is in the path of the Roaring Forties, strong and constant westerly winds, and the funneling effect of Cook Strait and the Manawatū Gorge increase the resource's potential. Over three-quarters (512 MW) of the country's wind generation is installed within a 150 km (93 mi) radius of Palmerston North, with some turbines in the area having a capacity factor of over 50 percent.

== Generation capacity and expansion ==
Large operational wind farms (>5MW) in New Zealand.

As of December 2020, New Zealand had an installed wind generation capacity of 690 MW. In the 2020 calendar year, wind power produced 2,282 GWh of electricity, 5.5 percent of the country's electricity generation that year.

A further 2,500 MW of wind farms have received resource consent.

By December 2025 New Zealand's installed wind generation capacity had almost doubled to 1,265 MW. Representing 12% of New Zealand's installed generation capacity.

The New Zealand Wind Energy Association predicts that wind could reach 20 percent of New Zealand's annual generation by 2035.

== Wind potential ==
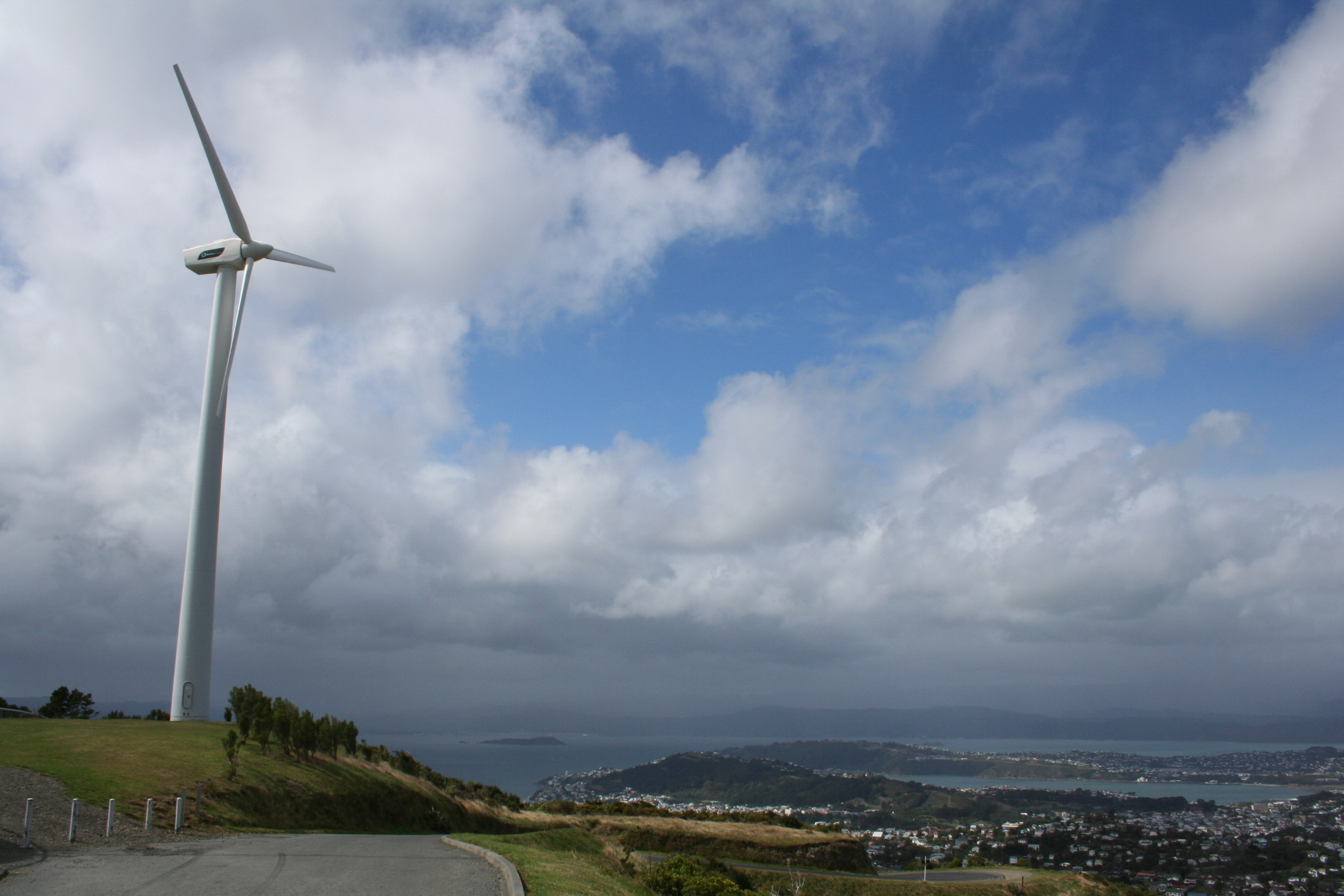
This demonstration wind turbine in Brooklyn, Wellington, was New Zealand's first turbine. It has since been upgraded. It was in operation for 22 years from 1993 to 2015.

New Zealand has outstanding wind resources, due to its position astride the Roaring Forties, resulting in nearly continuous strong westerly winds over many locations, unimpeded by other nearby landmasses at similar latitude. One study found that using 1% of total available land for wind farms would produce approximately 100,000 gigawatt hours (GWh) per year.

== Coping with intermittency ==
Wind farms partner well with hydro plants on the same grid to create combined power plants, because hydro plants can be uprated with extra turbine units to provide highly dispatchable peak generating capacity above the average flows of their rivers, at lower cost than other peak power options.

== List of operating wind farms ==
Only wind turbines and farms over 5 MW generating capacity are listed. Individual demonstration and prototype wind turbines have been installed at Southbridge in Canterbury, Gebbies Pass near Christchurch and Brooklyn in Wellington. Many small windmills serve as windpumps on New Zealand farms.

Name	Commissioned	Operator	Region	Number of turbines	Installed capacity (MW)	Annual average generation (GWh)	Coordinates
Flat Hill	2015 (September)	Pioneer Energy	Southland	8	6.8		46°35′S 168°17′E
Hau Nui	1997	NZ Windfarms	South Wairarapa	15	8.65	22	41°22′S 175°29′E
Harapaki	2023	Meridian Energy	Hawke's Bay	41	176		39°11′2″S 176°41′35″E
Kaiwera Downs	2023 (stage 1) 2026 (stage 2)	Mercury Energy	Southland	46	198	673	46°14′29″S 169°3′21″E
Mahinerangi	2011 (March)	Mercury Energy	Otago	12	36	105	45°45′S 169°54′E
Mill Creek	2014 (May)	Meridian Energy	Wellington	26	59.8		41°13′S 174°44′E
Mt Stuart	2011 (December)	Pioneer Energy	Otago	9	7.65		46°4′S 169°46′E
Tararua	1999–2007	Mercury Energy	Manawatū	134	161	650	40°21′S 175°47′E
Te Āpiti	2004	Meridian Energy	Manawatū	55	91	258	40°18′S 175°48′E
Te Rere Hau	2006–11	NZ Windfarms	Manawatū	97	48.5		40°23′S 175°43′E
Te Uku	2011	WEL Networks / Meridian Energy	Waikato	28	64.4		37°53′S 174°58′E
Turitea	2021 (northern stage) 2023 (southern stage)	Mercury Energy	Manawatū	60	220		40°26′28″S 175°40′17″E
Waipipi	2020 (November)	Mercury Energy	South Taranaki	31	133.3	455	39°47′S 174°33′E
Project West Wind	2009	Meridian Energy	Wellington	62	142.6	550	41°17′S 174°40′E
White Hill	2007	Meridian Energy	Southland	29	58	200	45°45′S 168°16′E

Meridian Energy also operates a 1 MW wind farm on Ross Island, Antarctica. It is not included in the above list as it does not contribute electricity to the New Zealand national electricity network.

=== Proposed and under construction ===
Name	Operator	Location	Projected capacity (MW)	Status	Comments	Coordinates
Jericho Wind Farm	Pioneer Energy	Southland	35	Proposed	Referral accepted to fast track	45°43′59″S 167°41′22″E
Castle Hill Wind Farm	Genesis		300	Consented (expires 2031)		40°43′0″S 175°56′0″E
Glen Massey	Ventus Energy		150	Proposed		
Hapuakohe	Manawa Energy	Waikato	230	Proposed		
Hokonui	Hokonui Energy		350	Proposed		
Kaihiku	Pioneer Energy / Manawa Energy	South Otago	300	Proposed	On fast-track list	46°16′3.66″S 169°26′33.74″E
Kaimai	Ventus Energy		157	Applied for Consent	On fast-track list	37°26′53.06″S 175°41′7.33″E
Kaiwaikawe	Mercury Energy	Northland	77	Under construction		35°52′8.6″S 173°43′50.85″E
Kohi Rd	NZ Windfarms		366	Proposed		
Kurow	Aquila Capital		130	Proposed	Up to 24 turbines	
Puke Kapo Hau	Mercury Energy	Otago	160	Consented	On fast-track list	45°45′38″S 169°54′18″E
Mākākahi	Kākāriki Renewables	Tararua	86	Proposed		
Mangapapa	Mamaku Renewables		450	Proposed		
Mount Cass	Yinson		93	Consented	As of 2024, project status is unclear after an investing company pulled out.	43°4′30″S 172°50′15″E
Mount Munro	Meridian Energy		90	Consented		40°41′40″S 175°41′36″E
Ototoka	Manawa Energy	Whanganui	150	Proposed		
Pahiatua	Yinson renewables	Tararua	56	Consented (expires 2035)		40°26′42″S 175°45′37″E
Project Huriwaka	Manawa Energy		300	Proposed		39°31′52.02″S 175°48′25.7″E
Puketoi	Mercury Energy		310	Consented (expires 2031)		40°32′23″S 176°3′23″E
Ratahiwi	Aquila Capital		90	Proposed		
Ruarangi	Aquila Capital		120	Proposed		
Santoft	Yinson Renewables		350	Proposed		
Southland (also formerly called "Slopedown")	Contact Energy		330	Consented		
Taumatatotara	Ventus Energy		32	Consented	Application for variation.	38°14′22.93″S 174°49′37.52″E
Vernon	Manawa Energy		100	Proposed		
Waikokowai	Mercury Energy	Waikato	300	Proposed	On fast-track list	
Waiuku	LET Capital		80	Consent declined		37°19′57.12″S 174°41′18.04″E
Waiinu Energy Park	Meridian	South Taranaki / Whanganui		Proposed		39.843°S 174.739°E
Te Rere Hau (repowering)	NZ Windfarms	Manawatū	121 (net)	Consented	Remove the 97 two-blade, 47m-high turbines already there and replace them with 30 three-blade, 162m-high turbines.	40°23′S 175°43′E
Aokautere Extension	NZ Windfarms	Manawatū	45	Consented	Extend the Te Rere Hau wind farm footprint to the northwest, into the Ernslaw forestry block. If successful, would be able to install up to nine new wind turbines of 5MW each capacity.	

=== Abandoned ===
Name	Operator	Projected capacity (MW)	Comments	Coordinates
Hauāuru mā raki	Contact Energy	540	Abandoned	37°34′4″S 174°48′18″E
Project Hayes	Meridian Energy	630	Abandoned in January 2012	45°30′39″S 169°53′3″E
Project Hurunui	Meridian Energy	71	Consents lapsed in 2023	42°59′33″S 172°57′32″E
Long Gully	Windflow Technology	12.5	Consents lapsed	41°19′36″S 174°43′4″E
Maungatua Wind Farm	Windpower Maungatua	25	Abandoned	
Motorimu Wind Farm	Motorimu Wind Farm	108	Consents surrendered	
Project Gumfields	Meridian Energy	99	No consents, apparently abandoned	
Puketiro	RES NZ	150	No consents, apparently abandoned	41°06′S 174°54′E
Rototuna	Meridian Energy	500	No consents, abandoned	36°15′0″S 174°1′48″E
Taharoa Wind Farm	Taharoa C	100	Consents lapsed	
Waitahora	Contact Energy	177	Consents lapsed, abandoned	40°21′44″S 176°10′24″E

== See also ==
- Energy in New Zealand
  - Biofuel in New Zealand
  - Electricity sector in New Zealand
  - Geothermal power in New Zealand
  - Hydroelectric power in New Zealand
  - List of power stations in New Zealand
  - Ocean power in New Zealand
  - Renewable energy in New Zealand
  - Solar hot water in New Zealand
  - Solar power in New Zealand
- Renewable energy by country
- Renewable energy commercialization
