= Town and Country Planning Act 1977 =

New Zealand Parliament
- Long title: An Act to consolidate and amend the law relating to the preparation, implementation, and administration of regional and district planning and to make provision for maritime planning.
- Commenced: 1 June 1978

Amended by
- Town and Country Planning Amendment Act 1980; Town and Country Planning Amendment Act 1983; Town and Country Planning Amendment Act 1987

Related legislation
- Resource Management Act 1991
- Status: Repealed

The Town and Country Planning Act 1977 was an Act of Parliament in New Zealand. It repealed the Town and Country Planning Act 1953 and its amendments, as well as Section 75 of the Local Government Act 1974. Town and Country Planning Act was itself repealed by the significant, and at times controversial, Resource Management Act 1991, along with many other Acts.

The Act was administered by the Ministry of Works and Development.

== See also ==
- Law of New Zealand
