= Meridian Energy =

New Zealand electricity generating and retailing company

Meridian Energy Limited
- Type: Public
- Traded as: NZX: MEL; ASX: MEZ
- Industry: Electricity generation Electricity retailing
- Predecessor: Electricity Corporation of New Zealand
- Founded: 16 December 1998; 27 years ago
- Headquarters: Wellington, New Zealand
- Key people: Mike Roan, Chief Executive
- Revenue: ▼NZ$2,319 million (2017)
- Operating income: ▲NZ$653 million (2017)
- Net income: ▲NZ$197 million (2017)
- Total assets: ▲NZ$8,665 million (2017)
- Total equity: ▲NZ$5,082 million (2017)
- Owner: New Zealand Government (50.39%, 2026); New Zealand Central Securities Depository Limited (29.36%, 2026)
- Number of employees: 959 (2017)
- Subsidiaries: Powershop
- Website: www.meridianenergy.co.nz

Meridian Energy Limited is a New Zealand electricity generator and retailer. The company generates the largest proportion of New Zealand's electricity, generating 35 percent of the country's electricity in the year ending December 2014, and is the fourth largest retailer, with 14 percent of market share in terms of customers as of December 2015.

Meridian was one of three electricity companies formed from the break-up of the Electricity Corporation of New Zealand (ECNZ) in 1998–99, taking over the Waitaki River and the Manapouri hydro schemes. Originally a state-owned enterprise wholly owned by the New Zealand Government, the company was partially privatised in October 2013 by the Fifth National Government, with the government retaining a 51.02% shareholding.

Today, Meridian operates seven hydroelectric power stations and one wind farm in the South Island of New Zealand, and four wind farms in the North Island.

== History ==
Meridian originated from the break-up of the Electricity Corporation of New Zealand (ECNZ) in 1999 as a result of the reforms of the New Zealand Electricity Market. Meridian's share of ECNZ was corporatised as a state-owned enterprise with its own board of directors and with two Ministerial shareholders: the Minister of Finance and the Minister of State-Owned Enterprises. In 2013 it was partially privatised by the fifth National Government of New Zealand.

As part of reforms, local electricity companies were split into lines and retail and the retail portion sold off. Meridian initially acquired the retail base of Northpower, Centralines, Scanpower, and Network Waitaki, and later acquired Orion's retail base from NGC.

- 2001 – Meridian purchased five mini hydro-power stations in Australia. These stations linked with dams used primarily for irrigation, and have a total generating capacity of 62 MW.
- September 2001 – Meridian purchased the South Island customer-base of Natural Gas Corporation (NGC), at the time New Zealand's largest electricity retailer. The purchase came towards the end of an exceptionally dry autumn. Low hydro-levels had driven the wholesale market spot prices to very high levels. NGC had purchased the customer-base when Canada's TransAlta quit New Zealand. NGC re-branded itself as OnEnergy to escape the poor reputation of the "TransAlta" brand. OnEnergy found itself with insufficient generation capacity to stand the high winter market prices and had made the critical mistake of not purchasing any hedge contracts. It attempted to raise its retail prices, but its customers then flocked to other retailers. Finally, after suffering huge losses, NGC had perforce to quit the retail sector, selling its customer-base to two of the Government's companies: Meridian and Genesis Energy. At that point, the New Zealand electricity market became further vertically integrated, and many have come to believe that this adversely affected competition in the retail electricity market.
- April 2003 – Meridian extended its operations in Australia with the purchase of Southern Hydro, increasing its Australian generating capacity by 540 MW.
- Southern Hemisphere Winter 2003 – Low hydro inflows and storage levels again resulted in exceptional wholesale market spot prices. As a consequence, the retailers TrustPower and Freshstart abandoned market areas where they had no generation. This strengthened Meridian's dominance of the South Island customer-base.
- 29 March 2004 – Meridian cancelled Project Aqua, a controversial 524 MW power scheme for six dams and a man-made canal on the Lower Waitaki River in North Otago. The scheme allegedly represented the last opportunity for large-scale hydroelectric development of this magnitude in New Zealand. Abandoning the venture cost Meridian NZ$38.7 million. – Meridian stopped the scheme because of uncertainty over rights to use the water, growing costs, and the difficulties and uncertainties with obtaining consents under the Resource Management Act legislation. In July 2004, Meridian announced an independent audit of the abandoned scheme.
- 9 December 2004 – then Prime Minister Helen Clark officially opened the Te Āpiti Wind Farm – Meridian's first wind farm.
- 2 June 2005 – Meridian announced a proposal to develop a wind farm west of Wellington, Project West Wind with up to 70 wind turbines with a total capacity of 210 MW, built across 55.8 square km on rural land near Mākara at the south-western tip of the North Island. A local pressure group, the Makara Guardians, opposed the scheme. Successful application for resource consent for the project was announced on 21 December 2005. The consent was subsequently appealed and upheld in May 2007.
- 30 November 2005 – Meridian completed the sale of its Australian operation, Southern Hydro, for A$1.42 billion (NZ$1.52 billion) to Australian Gas Light Company. Meridian had steadily expanded and upgraded its assets in Australia since purchase, including commissioning a 91 MW wind-farm. The sale commanded a hefty premium, driven by new demand for renewable energy-generation because of mandatory Australian requirements that electricity retailers sell a proportion of renewable energy.
- 8 June 2007 – The White Hill Wind Farm is officially opened.
- 29 April 2009 – Prime Minister John Key officially turns on the first 15 turbines on the West Wind wind farm.
- 1 June 2011 – The sale of Meridian Energy's Tekapo A and Tekapo B hydroelectric power stations to Genesis Energy took effect. The sale was part of a package of government reforms aimed at improving the electricity sector.
- 30 September 2013 – 49 percent of shares in the company officially offered for sale at between $1.50 and $1.80

In May 2025, Meridian Energy entered an agreement to acquire the Flick retail electricity business from Z Energy, along with Z Energy's electricity customers, for NZ$70 million.

== Power stations ==
Location of power stations owned and operated by Meridian Energy in New Zealand

Meridian Energy owns and operates seven hydroelectric power stations in the South Island – six on the Waitaki River and at Manapouri. It also owns and operates five wind farms in New Zealand, and a single turbine in Brooklyn, Wellington. In total, Meridian has a total installed capacity of 2,754 MW in New Zealand and 201 MW overseas.

Name	Type	Location	No. turbines	Capacity (MW)	Annual generation (average GWh)	Commissioned	Notes
New Zealand stations
Aviemore	Hydroelectric	Waitaki River	4	220	942	1968	
Benmore	Hydroelectric	Waitaki River	6	540	2215	1965	
Harapaki	Wind	34 km northwest of Napier	41	176		2023	
Manapouri	Hydroelectric	Lake Manapouri, Fiordland National Park	7	800	4800	1971	
Mill Creek	Wind	Ohariu Valley, NW of Wellington	26	60		2014	
Ōhau A	Hydroelectric	Waitaki River	4	264	1140	1979	
Ōhau B	Hydroelectric	Waitaki River	4	212	958	1984	
Ōhau C	Hydroelectric	Waitaki River	4	212	958	1985	
Te Āpiti	Wind	Ruahine Ranges	55	91	320	2004	
Te Uku	Wind	near Raglan, Waikato	28	64.4		2011	
Waitaki	Hydroelectric	Waitaki River	6	90	496	1934	
Wellington Wind Turbine	Wind	Brooklyn, Wellington	1	0.23	1	1993	
West Wind	Wind	Mākara, west of Wellington	62	143	600	2009	
White Hill	Wind	near Mossburn, Southland	29	58	230	2007	

=== Proposed ===
Projects being developed by Meridian Energy include the following.

Development projects
Name	Type	Capacity	Location	Status
Mt Munro	Wind	60 MW	Near Eketāhuna	Consents granted
Hurunui	Wind	80 MW	Greta Valley North Canterbury	consent lapsed in 2023
Pukaki	Hydro	35 MW	On the Pukaki River	Consents granted
Manapouri amended discharge project	Hydro			Consents granted
Ruakākā Energy Park	Solar and battery	130 MWp	Ruakākā, Northland	Battery under construction

=== Cancelled ===
Name	Type	Capacity	Location	Status
Project Aqua	Hydro	520 MW	South Canterbury	Cancelled March 2004
North Bank tunnel	Hydro	280 MW	on the Waitaki River	Cancelled January 2013
Project Hayes	Wind	630 MW	central Otago	Cancelled January 2012
Mokihinui Hydro	Hydro	60 MW	north of Westport	Cancelled May 2012
Project Central Wind	Wind	130 MW	Between Waiouru & Taihape, North Island	Consents expired; project sold to Manawa Energy
Project Gumfields	Wind		near Ahipara, Northland	Cancelled
Mohaka	Hydro	44 MW	Mohaka River, south of Wairoa	Cancelled
Rototuna	Wind	500 MW	Northland west coast	Cancelled 2017
Windy Peak	Wind		8 km SE of Martinborough	Cancelled

== Subsidiaries ==
- Dam Safety Intelligence Limited, a consultancy specialising in dam safety
- Powershop, an electricity retail broker.
- Flux Federation, an energy software platform.
- Arc Innovations (until 2014), a company specialising in electricity smart meters

== Sustainability ==
=== Carbon footprint ===
In 2006, Greenpeace judged Meridian as the only "green" electricity company in New Zealand. In 2007, Meridian announced that it had received CarboNZero certification from Landcare Research confirming that the generation and retailing of its electricity was carbon neutral.

In 2008, Meridian issued and sold the first carbon credits issued and sold under the JI program of the Kyoto Protocol.

In June 2008, National's Climate Change spokesman Nick Smith complained to the Commerce Commission that Meridian's claim of carbon neutrality in its advertising was misleading as Smith considered that Meridian had to buy thermally generated power during dry years to supply its customers. A spokesman for Meridian said they stood by the validity of the certification of their carbon-neutral status. In July 2009, the Commerce Commission concluded that Meridian's statements of carbon neutrality were not misleading.

=== Electric vehicles and charging programme ===
In 2015 Meridian began converting its business fleet to electric vehicles in an effort to reduce carbon emissions. In early 2019 Meridian joined the EV100 initiative, it has committed to its light passenger vehicle business fleet becoming 100% electric by 2030. In August 2019 the company won the Deloitte Energy Award for a Low Carbon Initiative for its work on electric business fleet conversion.

=== Kākāpō Recovery Programme ===
Meridian Energy are National Partners of the Department of Conservation Kākāpō Recovery Programme since 2016. Kākāpō are an endangered New Zealand native parrot. The involvement helps fund research and initiatives relating to genetics, nutrition, disease management and finding new sites. Meridian staff are also involved through providing electrical support and volunteers to the remote pest-free islands the kākāpō are surviving on.

=== Project River Recovery ===
In 1990 Meridian established Project River Recovery, recognising the impacts of hydroelectric development from the 1930s to the 1980s on the Waitaki's braided rivers and wetlands. Project River Recovery's work is run by the New Zealand Department of Conservation and includes intensive weed control, predator control, construction of wetlands, and research and monitoring programmes. When Tekapo A and Tekapo B were sold to Genesis Energy in 2011, the electricity company joined the compensatory funding agreement.

=== Waiau River Recovery ===
In 1996 the Waiau Fisheries and Wildlife Enhancement Trust was formed to mitigate and improve the Waiau River from impacts by the Manapouri Hydro Station. The trust was established in partnership with the Waiau Working Party and ECNZ (now Meridian Energy Limited). The area covered is from Te Wae Wae Bay in the south to Lake Te Anau in the north. The work focuses on enhancing wetlands, waterways and riparian plantings.

== Community ==
=== Wellington Wind Sculpture Walkway ===
Wellington is well known for wind and the Meridian Energy Wind Sculpture walkway celebrates this. In 2007 the four sculptures won Best Public Art and the final piece was opened in May 2010. The five sculptures are the Zephyrometer by Phil Price, Urban Forest by Leon van den Eijkel (in collaboration with Allan Brown), Akau Tangi by Phil Dadson, Tower of Light by Andrew Drummond and Pacific Grass by Kon Dimopoulos. The sculptures are managed by the Wellington Sculpture Trust.

=== KidsCan ===
In 2013 Meridian became the principle partner of the KidsCan Charity. In April 2019 the company committed to a further three years of support, helping provide lunches, raincoats, shoes and warm clothing to kids in need.

=== Power Up community fund ===
Meridian supports communities near its generation assets through the Power Up fund. This includes promoting conservation, community and educational efforts in seven communities around New Zealand.

== Controversy ==
In 2019, Meridian was found to mislead consumers when they implied the electricity they retailed was 100% renewable after a complaint was brought to the Advertising Standards Authority by rival retailer Electric Kiwi. Additionally, Meridian Energy was found to have pushed up power prices in December 2019 by unnecessarily spilling water from its South Island dams that could have been used for generation, according to a preliminary ruling from New Zealand's Electricity Authority.

== See also ==
- Electricity sector in New Zealand
- New Zealand electricity market
- Project Crimson, a conservation programme sponsored by Meridian Energy
