= Turitea Wind Farm =

Wind farm near Turitea, New Zealand

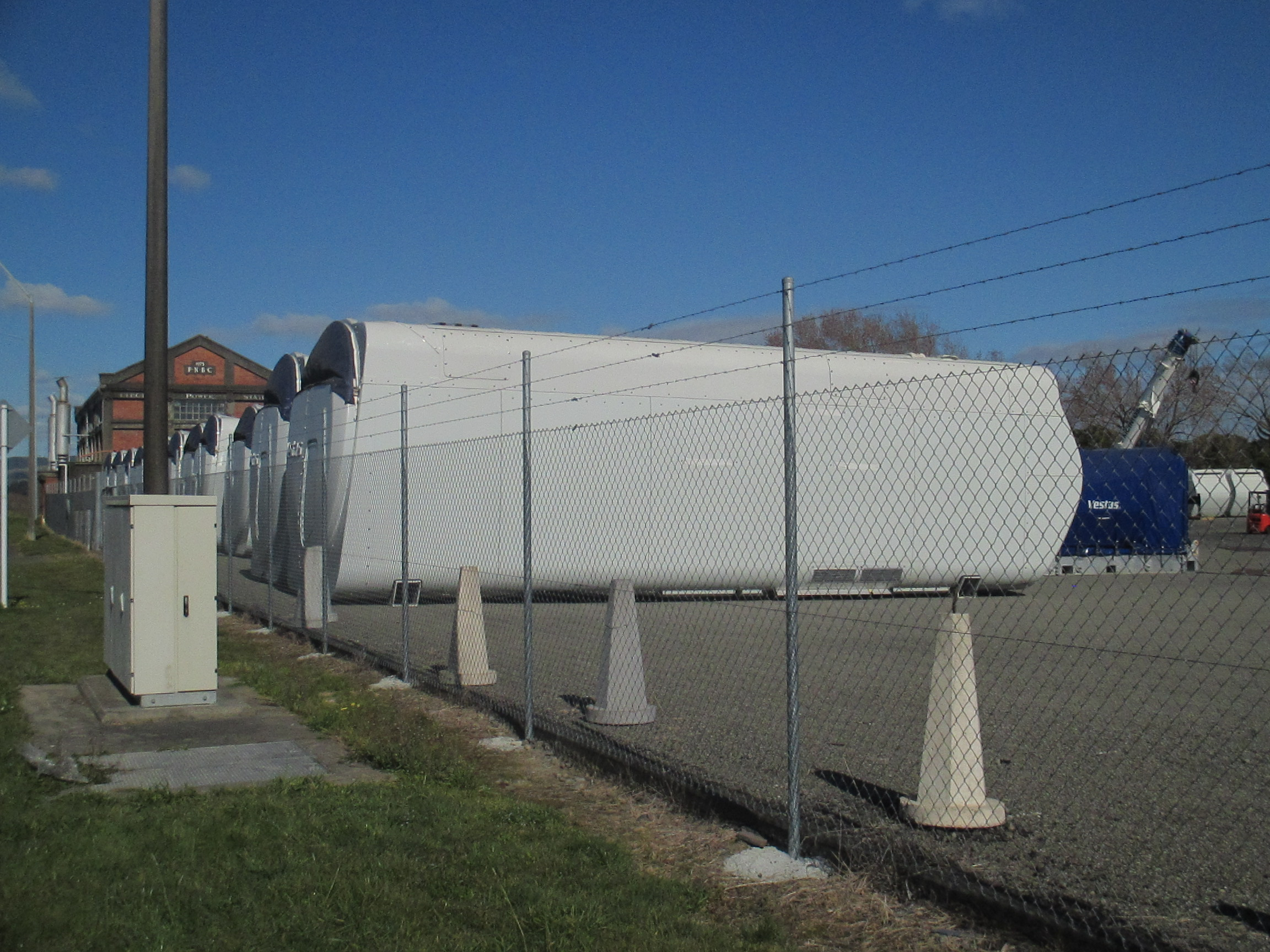
- Country: New Zealand
- Location: Palmerston North
- Coordinates: 40°26′28″S 175°40′17″E
- Status: Under construction
- Construction began: 29 October 2019
- Owner: Mercury Energy

Wind farm
- Type: Onshore wind farm
- Hub height: 69 metres (226 ft) m
- Rotor diameter: 112 metres (367 ft) m

Power generation
- Units operational: 33
- Make and model: Vestas V112-3.6MW and V112-3.8MW
- Units planned: 60
- Units under const.: 27
- Nameplate capacity: 222 MW
- Annual net output: 840 GWh

Turitea Wind Farm is a 222-megawatt wind farm near Turitea, Palmerston North, New Zealand. The farm is owned and operated by Mercury Energy.

Turitea is the largest wind farm by nameplate capacity in New Zealand, overtaking nearby Tararua Wind Farm. Most of the wind farm land is located in the Turitea Reserve. The project was initially planned for 131 wind turbines with a capacity of over 300 MW, while final approval was given for 60 turbines.

== History ==
The wind farm was proposed for both land owned by the Palmerston North City Council and surrounding private farm land. In 2005, and following a competitive bid process, the Council selected Mercury (then called Mighty River Power) to develop the project.

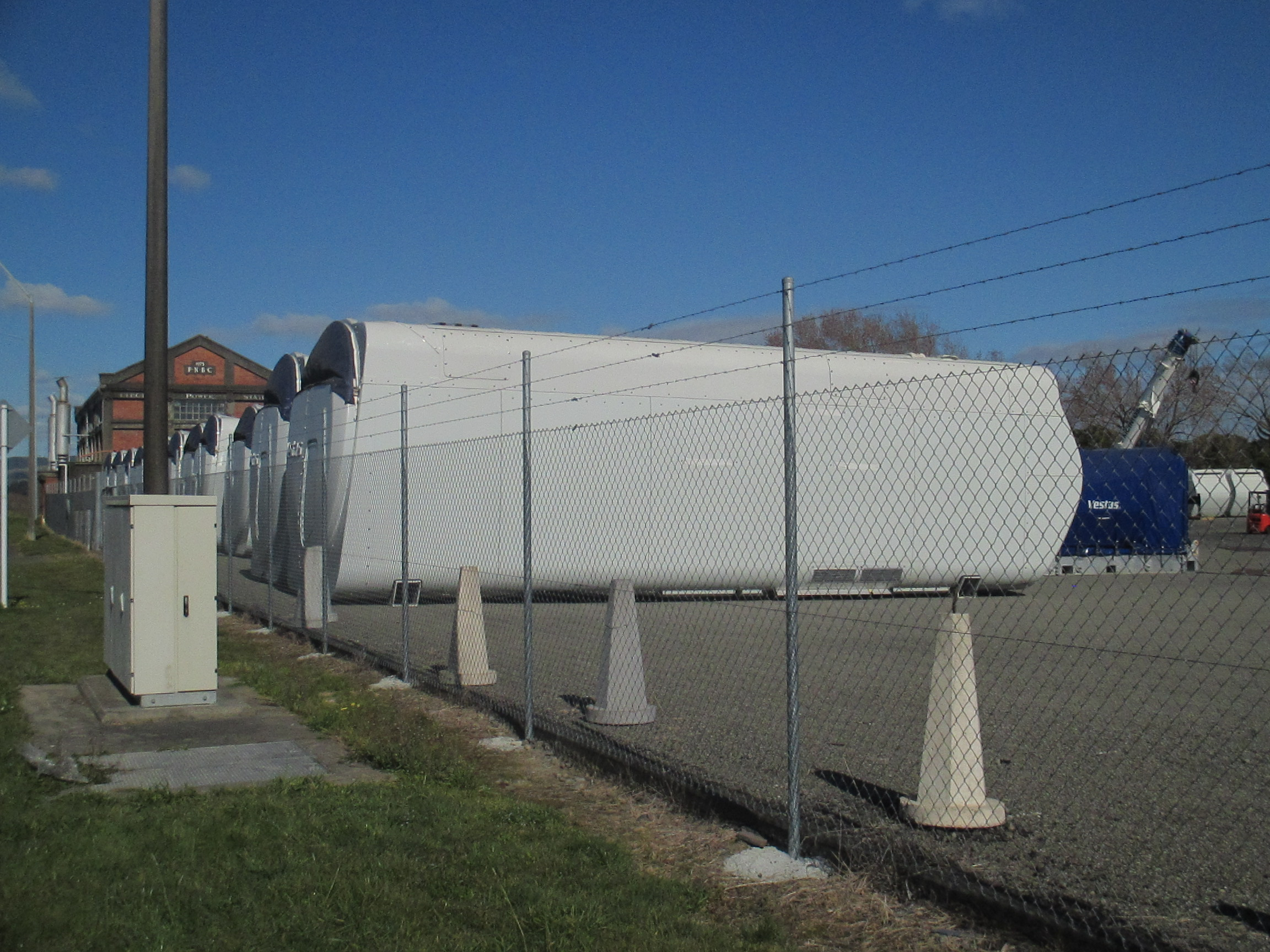
Generator housings for the Turitea Wind Farm being stored in Palmerston North

Construction of the Northern stage, consisting of 33 turbines, began in October 2019. Commissioning was initially expected in early 2021, however this was revised after challenges with the overland transport of turbine blades and commissioning was pushed back to the end of 2021. Construction of the Southern stage of 27 turbines followed.

Work on the wind farm was halted in March 2020 due to the COVID-19 pandemic lockdown. In December 2020, a ship fire at the Port of Napier destroyed 12 nacelles and 11 hubs destined for the Southern stage.

The wind-farm generated its first electricity on 30 July 2021. The final turbine of the northern stage was installed in October 2021, when 23 turbines were in operation. The Northern stage was fully operational by December 2021.

The wind farm was formally opened by Minister of Energy Megan Woods in May 2023, and is expected to be fully operational by the end of June.

== Consent process ==
In January 2005 after receiving multiple approaches from New Zealand electricity generators, the Palmerston North City Council sought a commercial partner for the construction of a wind farm in the Turitea Reserve. In August 2005 it signed a deal with Mighty River Power for development of the wind farm. The deal included plans for an eco-park funded by the city from wind-farm revenues, and for "milestone payments" from Mighty River to the council at various stages of the consent process.

The council began consultation on changes to the reserve's management plan in August 2006. The proposal was opposed by Forest and Bird and the Department of Conservation as damaging the integrity of the reserve and potentially contravening the Reserves Act 1977. In October 2006 the Palmerston North City Council changed the purpose of the reserve to include renewable electricity generation. A subsequent court challenge to the decision was unsuccessful.

Mighty River Power applied for resource consents for 131 turbines in 2008, and later applied to the Environment Minister for the project to be called in under the Resource Management Act. The call in process can result in faster processing of major projects, but in this case it coincided with the 2008 election and change of government. The Palmerston North City Council decided to continue with processing of the application, despite Mighty River Power's application for call-in.

In December 2008, the Minister for the Environment, Nick Smith, directed that the project be called in and the Board of Inquiry invited submissions and commenced sitting in 2009. The hearing adjourned for a period in 2009, to enable Mighty River Power to redesign the proposal, reducing it to 104 turbines. In 2010, the board resumed the hearing, with a draft decision in February 2011 permitting 61 turbines.

In 2011, the board issued its final decision, approving a wind farm of 60 turbines, up to 3 MW each. In October 2011, Mighty River Power stated in its annual report that the Turitea Wind Farm was not likely to be economically viable before 2015.

== Operation ==
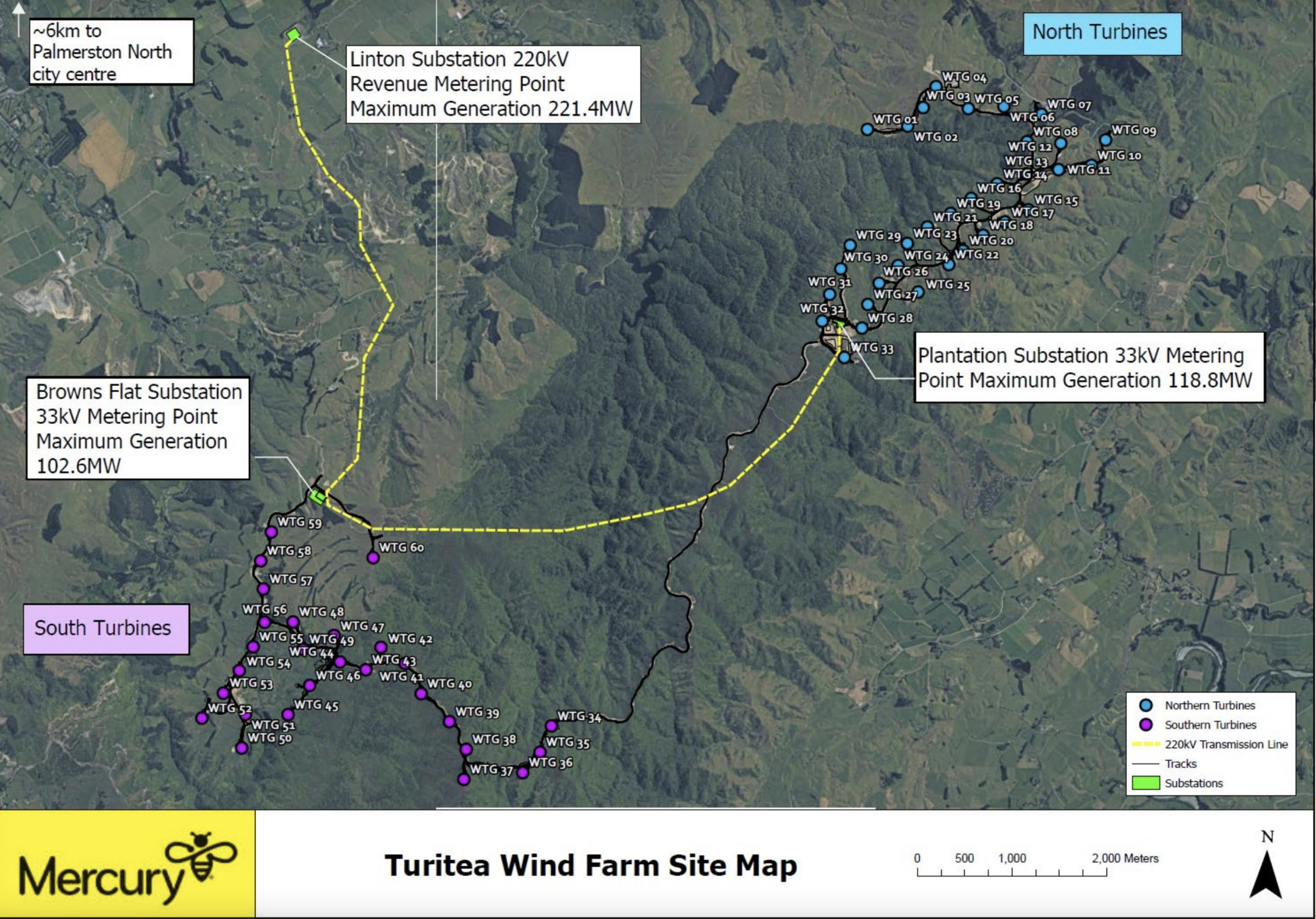
Turitea wind farm layout

The northern stage employs 33 Vestas V112-3.6 MW turbines, measuring 69 m (226 ft) from base to hub with a rotor diameter of 112 m (367 ft). The southern stage employs 27 Vestas V112-3.8 MW turbines.

A 12 km (7.5 mi)-long double circuit 220 kV transmission line connects the wind farm to Transpower's national grid at its Linton substation. The transmission line uses 20 monopoles and 18 lattice towers, with 8 structures installed by helicopter. The line is fed by two substations, one for each cluster of wind turbines, Plantation substation in the north, and Browns Flat substation in the south. The line has been built to allow for future wind projects in the area like the Puketoi wind farm as existing transmission capacity east of the Tararua Ranges is limited.

== See also ==
- Wind power in New Zealand
- Electricity sector in New Zealand
