= Castle Hill Wind Farm =

Wind farm in New Zealand

- Country: New Zealand
- Location: east of Eketāhuna
- Coordinates: 40°43′0″S 175°56′0″E
- Status: Proposed
- Owner: Genesis Energy

Wind farm
- Type: Onshore
- Hub height: 90–100 m (295–328 ft)
- Rotor diameter: 80–110 m (262–361 ft)

Power generation
- Units operational: up to 71
- Nameplate capacity: up to 300 MW

External links
- Website: Castle Hill -- Genesis Energy

The Castle Hill Wind Farm is a proposed 300 MW wind farm being developed by Genesis Energy. Conceived as a much larger installation of 286 wind turbines with potential output of up to 858 MW depending on the model of wind turbines selected, it was initially estimated to cost more than $1.6 billion and be New Zealand's largest wind farm.

The resource consent application was lodged in August 2011 and consents were granted in June 2012. This was appealed to the Environment Court. In July 2013, Genesis announced that all appeals had been resolved. Resource consent for the project was set to expire in 2023 if work was not begun before 2023.

In February 2021, Genesis announced that constructing the wind farm remained an option. In August, they announced they had no plans to build it. In September 2021, Genesis said that the wind farm was still part of their plans for renewable development, but that other projects had been prioritised ahead of it.

In March 2023, Genesis applied to extend the resource consent for the wind farm and vary its conditions. Its proposal involves reducing the size of the windfarm to 300 MW.

== See also ==
- Wind power in New Zealand
