= Tararua Wind Farm =

Wind farm in New Zealand

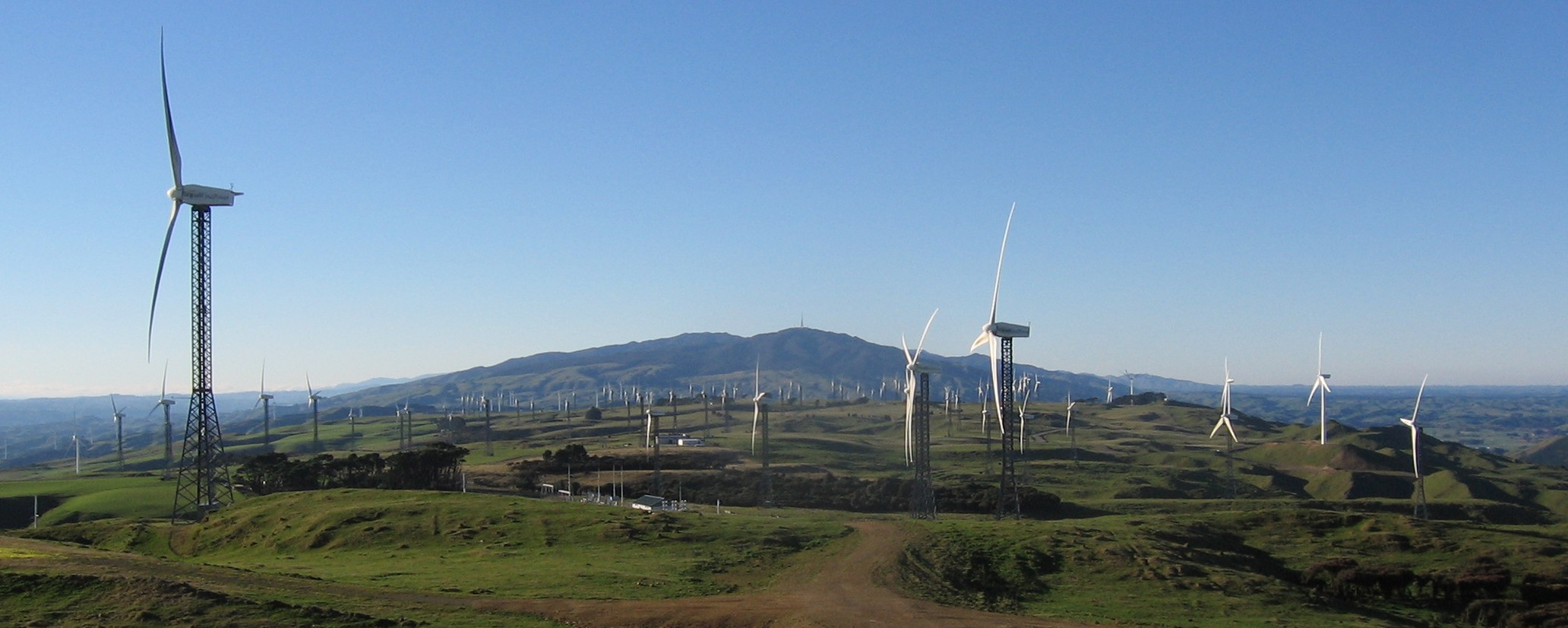
- Country: New Zealand
- Location: Tararua Ranges, east of Palmerston North
- Coordinates: 40°20′46″S 175°46′48″E
- Status: Operational
- Commission date: 1999 (stage 1); 2004 (stage 2); 2007 (stage 3)
- Owner: Mercury NZ Ltd

Wind farm
- Type: Onshore
- Rotor diameter: 47m (V47); 90m (V90)
- Site area: 700ha

Power generation
- Make and model: V47 (103 turbines); V90-3MW (31 turbines)
- Nameplate capacity: 161 MW

External links
- Commons: Related media on Commons

The Tararua Wind Farm is a wind farm owned and operated by Mercury NZ Ltd. It is located on 700ha of farmland on the Tararua Ranges of New Zealand. The first stage of the wind farm was commissioned in 1999. The farm has been upgraded twice since, with the most recent addition commissioned in September 2007. It was the largest wind farm in New Zealand until 2023, when the nearby Turitea Wind Farm was completed.

The wind farm consists of 134 turbines of two different types:

- 103 Vestas V47 turbines, each rated at 660 kW, with three 23.5m long blades. Each turbine is mounted on a 40m high steel lattice tower.
- 31 Vestas V90-3MW turbines, each rated at 3 MW with three 45m long blades.

The V47 turbines connect into Powerco's Palmerston North distribution network via twin 33,000-volt lines. The V90 turbines connect into Transpower's national grid via a tee off one circuit of the Bunnythorpe to Linton 220,000-volt transmission line.

On 6 October 2021, one of the V90 turbines caught fire. Five turbines in the same cluster were taken out of service due to the fire.

== See also ==
- Te Rere Hau Wind Farm
- Wind farm
- Wind power in New Zealand
