= Yinson Holdings =

Malaysian infrastructure conglomerate

Yinson Holdings Berhad
- Company type: Public
- Traded as: MYX: 7293
- ISIN: MYL7293OO003
- Industry: Conglomerate
- Founded: 1984; 42 years ago
- Founder: Lim Han Weng
- Headquarters: Kuala Lumpur, Malaysia
- Area served: 15 countries and territories: Malaysia; Singapore; Vietnam; Indonesia; Angola; Brazil; Chile; Colombia; Ghana; India; Italy; Netherlands; New Zealand; Nigeria; Norway; Peru; United Kingdom; United States
- Key people: Lim Han Weng (Chairperson); Lim Chern Yuan (CEO)
- Revenue: ▲RM 11,646 million (2024)
- Net income: ▲RM 11.42 million (2024)
- Total assets: ▲RM 28,692 million (2024)
- Subsidiaries: Yinson Production; Yinson Renewables; Yinson GreenTech
- Website: www.yinson.com

Yinson Holdings Berhad (Chinese: 云升控股; pinyin: Yúnsheng Kònggǔ; Jyutping: Wan4 sing1 Hung3 gu2) is a Kuala Lumpur-headquartered, Malaysian energy infrastructure conglomorate that has diversified its operations across offshore production, renewable energy, and green technologies. Established as a logistics company in Johor Bahru in 1984 by Lim Han Weng, the company went public in 1996. It expanded its focus to the energy sector 2011, aiming to develop and provide various energy solutions, while taking the trucking business private.

== Business ==
=== Offshore production ===
Yinson's Offshore Production business, conducted through its subsidiary Yinson Production, is a core component of the group's operations, focusing on the ownership and operation of Floating Production Storage and Offloading (FPSO) vessels, as well as offshore gas and oil production operations. The group held capabilities of the development and production phases of the offshore oil & gas field lifecycle, covering selsmic survey, exploration, development, production, and eventual decommissioning. This segment positions Yinson Production as a significant entity in the global FPSO market, notably identified as the world's second-largest operator by contract value. As of recent reports, the company manages a fleet of nine FPSO vessels, which are deployed globally under long-term contracts, some extending up to 25 years. A recent example of this expansion is the delivery of the Agogo FPSO for operations in Angola, a project anticipated to generate $5.3 billion in revenue over its 15-year contract duration.

The development of new FPSO units, such as the Agogo FPSO, incorporates green technologies aimed at reducing environmental impact, with this specific vessel designed to achieve a 27% reduction in carbon emissions compared to older designs. The capital-intensive nature of the FPSO business necessitates substantial financing, and Yinson Production has utilized increased debt to support its expansion, while the long-term, stable nature of its contracts has contributed to maintaining profitability. To fund ongoing growth in this segment and other strategic areas, the company has secured significant investments, including a recent $1 billion injection from international investors. There is also a reported consideration for a potential public listing of the Yinson Production unit in the future.

=== Renewable energy ===
Yinson Holdings has a significant presence in the renewable energy sector through its subsidiary, Yinson Renewables. This arm operates as a global independent power producer, focusing on developing, owning, and operating large-scale renewable energy assets, primarily solar and wind power projects. The company's portfolio is strategically diversified across three key regions: Asia Pacific (which includes India, Indonesia, and Malaysia), Latin America (covering Brazil, Chile, Colombia, and Peru), and Europe (specifically Italy and New Zealand). Yinson Renewables has the core objective to contribute to the global energy transition, by securing long-term power purchase agreements (PPAs) for the clean electricity it generates.

Yinson Renewables has established solar plants in India, notably the 175 MWp Bhadla Solar Park and the 285 MWp Nokh Solar Park. In Latin America, a notable achievement is the 97 MWp Matarani Solar Plant in Peru, which began full operations in September 2024. This project marks Yinson's first operational venture in Peru and is recognized as the country's second-largest solar energy producer. Beyond current operations, Yinson Renewables continues to develop new projects in its target regions, including additional solar initiatives in Peru, and is actively exploring opportunities in wind and other emerging renewable technologies. As of 2025, Yinson Renewables operates 557 MW of utility-scale renewable generating assets, supported by a substantial pipeline exceeding 1.5 GW in development and over 3 GW in early-stage opportunities, underscoring its ongoing commitment to expanding its clean energy capacity.

=== Green technologies ===
Yinson Holdings established Yinson GreenTech (YGT) in 2020 as a dedicated business unit to develop and implement clean technology solutions across various sectors, including marine, mobility, and infrastructure. Within this segment, a key focus is on electric vehicle (EV) charging infrastructure. YGT operates chargEV, which has become a significant EV charging network, particularly in Malaysia and Singapore, featuring over 300 cross-border charging points. This initiative has involved partnerships, such as a collaboration with Khazanah to further strengthen the EV charging ecosystem. In December 2024, YGT expanded its partnership with Handal Indah and GoCar Malaysia to enhance Green Mobility in Johor Bahru, through car sharing service that are easily accessible from electric public bus drop-off points.

Beyond land-based mobility, Yinson GreenTech is actively involved in marine electrification through its marinEV ventures. This includes the establishment of electric vessel charging stations, such as Singapore's first electric vessel charging station developed in partnership with Wilhelmsen Ships Service. YGT's efforts in this area also extend to pioneering projects like the introduction of Singapore's first all-electric cargo ship and the unveiling of an electric hydrofoil harbor launch. The company also maintains strategic investments in related clean energy technologies, which supports EV adoption in Southeast Asia through battery swapping solutions. YGT previously explored the electric two-wheeler market with investment in Oyika in 2021 under a joint venture brand RydeEV, it has since exited this segment in 2025.
