= Environment Court of New Zealand =

Specialist court for land use and environmental issues

- Te Kōti Taiao o Aotearoa (Māori)
- Established: 1996
- Jurisdiction: New Zealand
- Location: Auckland, Wellington and Christchurch
- Authorised by: Resource Management Act 1991
- Appeals to: High Court of New Zealand
- Website: environmentcourt.govt.nz

Chief Environment Court Judge
- Currently: Judge D A Kirkpatrick
- Since: 2020

The Environment Court of New Zealand (Māori: Te Kōti Taiao o Aotearoa) is a specialist court for plans, resource consents and environmental issues. It mainly deals with issues arising under the Resource Management Act, meaning that it covers a wide range of potential future effects of planning applications, which can include such areas as traffic congestion, noise/pollution emissions and social and commercial consequences, rather than just the 'ecological' aspects that could be implied by the 'environmental' term.

== History ==
The history of independent appeal courts addressing environmental matters began with the establishment of Appeal Boards under the Town and Country Planning Act 1953. The first planning appeals were heard in February 1955. The Appeal Boards were replaced by the Planning Tribunal following the passing of the Town and Country Planning Act 1977.

The Environment Court replaced the Planning Tribunal as a result of the Resource Management Amendment Act 1996.

== Jurisdiction ==
The Environment Court has a substantially larger role than the Planning Tribunal, with expanded functions and powers over planning, resource consents and enforcement. Virtually all important processes and decisions under the Resource Management Act 1991, such as regional policy statements, regional and district plans, resource consents and Water Conservation Orders, may be appealed to the Environment Court.

In particular, the Environment Court hears appeals on decisions on applications for resource consent on a 'de novo' basis. The Environment Court does not review the decision: it hears any evidence it requires and makes its own decision, which replaces that of the local authority. It focuses on "the merits and substance of the particular decision at issue, not the deliberative process of the executive authority that made the initial decision."

The Environment Court also has the power to make declarations that interpret the law under the Resource Management Act.

The Environment Court has the status and powers of a District Court, so it can conduct prosecutions and enforcement of the Resource Management Act through civil or criminal proceedings.

The Environment Court also has functions under other statutes:

- Forests Act 1949 – Appeals about felling native beech forests,
- Local Government Act 1974 – Objections to road stopping proposals,
- Public Works Act 1981 – Objections to the compulsory taking of land,
- Transit New Zealand Act 1989 – Objections regarding access to limited access roads,
- Crown Minerals Act 1991 – Administration of existing privileges,
- Electricity Act 1992 – Disputes about land access to existing works,
- Historic Places Act 1993 – Appeals about historic and archaeological sites,
- Biosecurity Act 1993 – Appeals about regional pest strategies,
- Maori Commercial Aquaculture Claim Settlement Act 2004 – Appeals against allocation decisions of regional councils.

Decisions of the Environment Court may only be appealed to the High Court of New Zealand on a point of law.

== Structure ==
The Environment Court is a single court, but it has no centralised courthouse and it sits in courthouses across the country. Judges for the court are permanently stationed in Wellington, Auckland, and Christchurch, but they travel to other centres on circuit as needed.

== See also ==
- Environmental Protection Authority (New Zealand)
