= Poihipi Power Station =

Geothermal power station in New Zealand

- Country: New Zealand
- Location: Taupō
- Coordinates: 38°37′49″S 176°2′30″E
- Status: Operational
- Commission date: 1996
- Owner: Contact Energy

Power generation
- Nameplate capacity: 55 MW

The Poihipi Power Station is a geothermal power station owned and operated by Contact Energy. It is located on Poihipi Road near Taupō in New Zealand.

The plant produces around 350 GWh pa, utilising geothermal steam from the Wairakei field, and is operated as part of the Wairakei geothermal system.

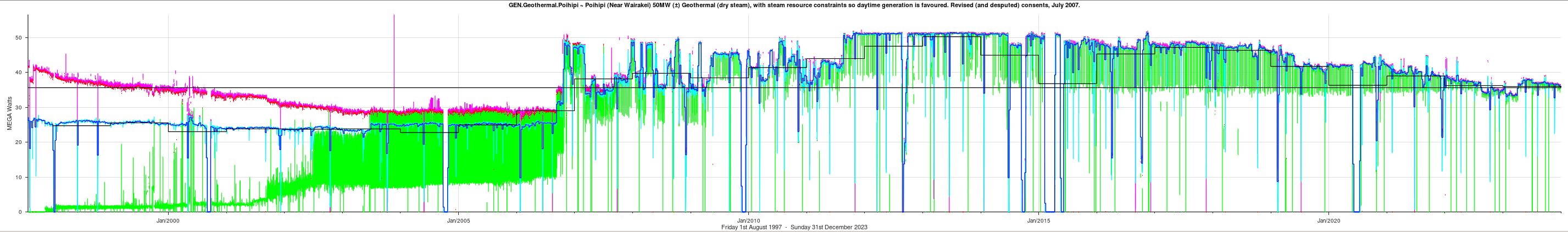
Electricity Generation at Poihipi, New Zealand.

== Development ==
The station has had a contentious history. In the beginning, Alistair McLachlan and his wife Ava Marie ran a sheep farm for their Waituruturu trust, but also a greenhouse to grow roses and orchids in "artificial monsoon" conditions enabled by geothermal heat: approximately two square kilometres of their land overlaid the Wairakei geothermal field. Their Waituruturu trust joined with Mercury Network (wholly owned subsidiary of Mercury Energy) to form a joint venture, Mercury Geotherm Limited, (33% owned by the McLauchlans, or 49% according to the N.Z. Herald, 11 January 2005) and Poihipi Land Limited, wholly owned by MGL. Some land was for the power station, the rest remained as farmland.

The original design involved two 23 MW refurbished Elliot turbine-generators but late in the design these were abandoned in favour of a newer Fuji Electric 55 MW system completed for the Geysers geothermal field in the US by the state of California, but never run. Despite the cost of conversion from the U.S.A standard of 60 cycles/sec. to the N.Z. standard of 50 cycles/sec. the resulting project was much cheaper than using new equipment. (Utilisation of Second-Hand Plant to Reduce Capital Investment and Project Lead Times, Minoru Frederiksens et al., 2000)

Steam supply constraints limited full power to about fourteen hours a day, with only about 3 MW at night. All other geothermal stations are typically run at constant full power. This unusual operating pattern attracted analysis, as in Optimised Numerical Modelling of Production from the Poihipi Dry Steam Zone: Wairakei Geothermal System by Sadiq J. Zarrouk et al., 2006.

Initial maximum power levels soon fell from ~43 MW to 30 MW due to a shortage of steam. In 2001 Contact applied for fresh consents (for Wairakei, and Poihipi which it had bought in 2000) which were granted in 2004 but appealed against by the Taupō Council (concerned over land subsidence) and others. In 2007, approval was gained, so with access to more steam (from the whole field, not just that under the McLachlan's land) generation attained 50 MW, full-time; the plot shows that such operation precedes 2007. Ignoring the single value of 56.56 MW (for 10:30pm 22/11/2003, likely a data error), maximum generation plateaued at just under 52 MW over 2012 - 2015, and has fallen since.

=== Litigation ===
Litigation started in 1989 between the Electricity Corporation of New Zealand and Geotherm Energy Limited (owned by the Waituruturu Trust), challenging ECNZ's entitlement to draw geothermal fluid from the Wairakei field and in 1990 GEL applied to take 44,000 tonnes/day for their new power station, to be named Poihipi, but was granted only 10,000 tonnes/day. ECNZ objected because of their need for the Wairakei power station. A report describing this need was not made available to GEL, despite applications and in frustration, GEL applied to declare the ECNZ "anti-competitive" and using their dominant market position to deter advisors, service providers, customers, financiers and investors from dealing with GEL, as well as making baseless statutory applications to hinder GEL's planning applications, and that the ECNZ intended to prevent GEL from supplying power to Electrical Supply Authorities.

By 1996 the power station was built. MGL attempted to apply for additional consents allowing the discharge of contaminants to the air, but the Ngati Rauhoto hapu appealed due to inadequate consultation. An application to commence usage was rejected because it was MGL's error in deciding to complete the station before securing all necessary consents, but a priority hearing was allowed. Ngati Rauhoto sought to relitigate the power station consent, but were estopped as having already accepted the use of geothermal fluid. Costs of $700,000 were awarded against Ngati Rauhoto.

Immediately after consents were granted, it became clear that the deep liquid steam wells did not provide sufficient fluid. As well, changes to the electricity pricing scheme made it less profitable for Mercury Network to buy power from the station. MGL wrote the value of the plant down to $50,000,000 and could not cover the debenture of $80,000,000, thus the call for the appointing of receivers for MGL and PLL, but the McLauchlans obtained an interim injunction against this. Meanwhile, the Electricity Corporation had been dissolved and the Wairakei power plant was now owned by Contact Energy Limited, who had applied for consent to reinject used fluid as part of their new low-temperature plant to be added to the main Wairaki stations, thus reducing their dumping into the Waikato river. MGL objected because this reinjection of low-temperature fluid (much cooler than that already being re-injected) would be detrimental to their Poihipi plant. But in December 1998 Judge Whiting held that Contact's existing (inherited) consents allowed for reinjection at any temperature and consequently, receivers were appointed for MGL and PLL, who decided to sell the Poihipi power plant and the leased land to Contact.

The McLachlans responded with litigation on two fronts: suing Mercury Energy (by then split, into retail activity still called Mercury Energy but taken over by Mighty River Power, while the line network business became Vector) for faults that led to the failure of the joint venture (claiming $400,000,000), and, denying that the land had been properly sold to Contact as the McLaughlans (the pre-MGL owners) had arranged for the right of first refusal should that land be sold. Multiple entanglements, reaching to the Privy Council ensued.

In a deed of settlement in 2006, the McLauchlans abandoned damages proceedings and further arguments over the lease. This however triggered more reverberations in the workings (or not) of the lease but the High Court held that arguments based on an implied term, rectification, mistake, estoppel, and relief against forfeiture were rejected, and that the lease was void for having an uncertain term of application.

Thus, the "right of first refusal" did not in fact protect the McLauchlans, and, Contact retains a competitive advantage. Details in Climate Change Law, Simon Schofield, 2014.

The web page https://web.archive.org/web/20141225112813/http://www.contactenergy.co.nz/aboutus/shared/powerstations merely states "The Poihipi Road power station was commissioned in 1997 and was bought by Contact in 2000."

In 2004, the McLachlans secured resource consent for a second Poihipi power station just over a kilometre SSE and again encountered objection from Contact.

== See also ==
- List of power stations in New Zealand
- Electricity sector in New Zealand
