= Hauauru ma raki =

Proposed wind farm in New Zealand

Hauāuru mā raki
- Country: New Zealand
- Location: Between Port Waikato and Raglan, Waikato
- Coordinates: 37°34′4″S 174°48′18″E
- Status: Cancelled
- Owners: Contact Wind (Contact Energy / Wind Farm Group joint venture)

Wind farm
- Type: Onshore
- Site area: 168 km^{2} (65 sq mi)

Power generation
- Units operational: 168 (maximum)
- Nameplate capacity: 504 MW
- Annual net output: 1,440 GWh

Hauāuru mā raki was a proposed wind farm development on the Waikato coast of New Zealand.

The project would have extended 34 km along the coast between Port Waikato and Raglan. The project would have covered an area of 168 square kilometres (65 sq mi) and had a capacity of up to 504 MW. The wind farm would have been owned and operated by Contact Wind Ltd, a joint venture between national electricity generator Contact Energy and the local Wind Farm Group. The project would have provided around 1440 GWh of electricity per year, equivalent to 180,000 homes.

Contact Energy applied for resource consents in June 2008. At that time, the first electricity from the wind farm was planned for 2013 with the project due for completion by 2016. In 2013, Contact announced that it planned to exit the project, due to, "the current supply and demand outlook and the competitiveness of the Tauhara geothermal development".

== Resource consents ==
In September 2008, the Energy Minister "called in" the project, meaning that instead of going through the standard resource consent process, the decision will be made by an independent board of enquiry. The move is possible if a project is considered to be of "national significance", and is generally (but rarely) used when the decision on an important project might otherwise be held up for a long time due to the standard process.

The Board of Inquiry established to consider the proposal was chaired by Environment Court judge Jeffrey Allan Smith. Other members of the Board were Dr Diane Menzies, Ms Gina Rangi and Mr John Lumsden. Hearings commenced on 27 April 2009 at Tuakau. In May, Contact requested a 12-month adjournment of proceedings to enable time to compile additional details requested by the Board of Inquiry.

In May 2011, the board granted resource consents for the project, with conditions limiting the turbines to a height of 150m and three blades of up to 50m length.

== See also ==
- Wind power in New Zealand
- List of power stations in New Zealand
