= Te Huka Power Station =

Geothermal power station near Taupō, New Zealand

- Country: New Zealand
- Location: Centennial Drive, Taupō
- Coordinates: 38°40′1″S 176°7′5″E
- Status: Operational
- Commission date: 2010
- Owner: Contact Energy

Geothermal power station
- Type: Binary cycle

Power generation
- Nameplate capacity: 23 MW

The Te Huka Geothermal Power Station, also known as Tauhara One, is a 23 MW binary cycle geothermal power station situated near Taupō, New Zealand. The power station is operated by Contact Energy.

In July 2008, Contact Energy announced that the contract for supply and construction of the binary cycle equipment was awarded to Ormat Technologies.

The plant is powered with steam and fluid from the Tauhara steamfield, and all used geothermal fluid is reinjected back into the edge of the steamfield. A 33,000-volt line connects the power station to Transpower's Wairakei substation, injecting the station's electricity into both Unison's Taupō distribution network and the national grid.

The Tauhara One plant was opened in May 2010, three weeks ahead of schedule.

The power station was formerly known as Centennial Drive binary.

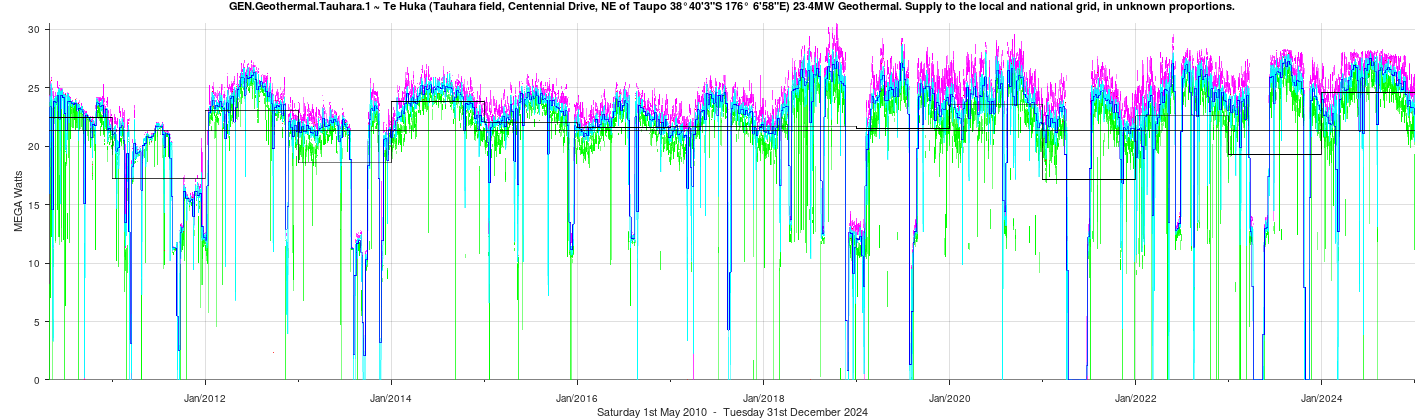
Electricity Generation at Te Huka.

== See also ==
- List of power stations in New Zealand
- Geothermal power in New Zealand
- Tauhara Power Station
