= Stratford Power Station =

National power station

- Country: New Zealand
- Location: Taranaki
- Coordinates: 39°19′56″S 174°19′8″E
- Status: Operational
- Construction began: Early 1970s, 1996, 2009
- Commission date: 1976, 1998, 2011
- Decommission date: 2001
- Owner: Contact Energy

Thermal power station
- Primary fuel: Natural gas
- Cooling source: Pātea River
- Combined cycle?: Yes

Power generation
- Nameplate capacity: 577 MW

The Stratford Power Station is a 577 MW power station located east of Stratford, in Taranaki, New Zealand. The original power station on the site was a 200 MW gas turbine power plant that opened in 1976 and closed in 2001. The current power station comprises a 377 MW combined cycle unit that opened in 1998 and two open cycle gas turbine units for peaking power that opened in 2011. The station is now owned and operated by Contact Energy.

== Original gas turbine plant ==
Construction of the Stratford Gas Turbine Plant, a 200 MW power station, was completed on what is now the Stratford Power Station site in June 1976. It comprised four 50 MW units, each a Pratt and Whitney TwinPak of two FT4 gas turbines. The FT4 engine is the stationary version of the Pratt & Whitney JT4 aircraft engine. The plant was fired on natural gas, and the units were in open cycle configuration. The FT4 units were owned and operated (in turn) by NZED, NZE, ECNZ and Contact Energy. The four 50 MW units were decommissioned and removed in 2001, and used in the construction of the Valley Power Peaking Facility in Australia.

== Greenhouse gas emissions and mitigation of climate change ==
In 1993, the Environment Minister Simon Upton established a board of inquiry under the Resource Management Act to hear the application for a resource consent for Electricity Corporation of New Zealand's (ECNZ) proposed 400 megawatt Stratford power station in Taranaki. The scheme was known as the Taranaki Combined Cycle (TCC) project.

In February 1995, the board of inquiry concluded that the station's operation would significantly increase New Zealand's emissions of carbon dioxide and make it more difficult for the Government to meet its obligation to reduce the emission of greenhouse gases to their 1990 levels as committed to under the United Nations Framework Convention on Climate Change. The board of inquiry recommended that ECNZ must establish a carbon sink "sufficient to eventually store in perpetuity the equivalent quantity of carbon emitted from the site over the term of the permit".

In March 1995, Upton approved the expansion of the station to 400-megawatts on the condition that forests were planted to create a carbon sink or the effect of emissions was reduced by greater efficiency elsewhere.

In June 2003, a hearing committee of the Taranaki Regional Council granted an application to delete the consent conditions requiring mitigation of carbon dioxide emissions.

== Combined cycle plant ==
The Taranaki Combined Cycle (TCC) power station consists of one 377 MW combined cycle unit, based on a GT26 gas turbine in single shaft configuration. Cooling is by a mechanical draft cooling tower, using water from the Pātea River. Fletcher Construction started construction in 1996 and it was commissioned in 1998. It was purchased by Contact Energy in 2003.

== Peaker plant ==
The 200 MW Stratford Peaker plant was built on the site in 2009–2010. It comprises two LMS100 gas turbine units in open cycle configuration, and is used as a peaking power plant, to complement hydro and wind generation. It was officially opened by Prime Minister John Key on 31 May 2011.

== Solar farm ==
In December 2024 Contact proposed replacing the Taranaki Combined Cycle plant with a 170MW solar farm. The solar farm was grantes resource consent by the Environment Court in October 2026.

== See also ==
- List of power stations in New Zealand
- Electricity sector in New Zealand
