= Paul Anthony =

Welsh businessman

Paul Anthony (born 1955) is a Welsh senior executive who has operated in chief executive officer, executive chair and non-executive positions within the energy sector internationally, including in the United Kingdom, New Zealand and Australia.

== Life and career ==
Anthony was born in Wales. Anthony's career began in the UK electricity industry. His roles have included Executive Vice President of British Gas Group (2000–2002), and a series of executive positions with PowerGen, which Anthony helped lead through the United Kingdom privatisation process in the 1990s. He worked with UK investment house Doughty Hanson & Co and ran its wholly owned investment in LM Glasfiber.

Anthony was founding chief executive officer of New Zealand's Contact Energy, leading the company from February 1996 until July 2000, including in the time of privatisation of the company in May 1999. His payout of NZ$6.6 million, which included a compensation for removal of a golden parachute in his contract following privatisation, was unprecedented in New Zealand and drew criticism by the prime minister Helen Clark. He was one of the highest paid executives in New Zealand.

Anthony was chief executive officer of Energy Power Resources from 2002 to 2005, one of the United Kingdom's largest renewable energy companies. In October 2005, Anthony was appointed CEO of LM Glasfiber. He left the company in February 2006 after accepting the offer by Australian energy company AGL Energy.

Anthony became chief executive officer of AGL Energy with effect from 3 April 2006 and managing director on 1 May 2006. At AGL Energy, he oversaw an A$6b asset swap with Australian energy generator and retailer Alinta, electricity provider Powerdirect Australia was purchased, and a large shareholding in Queensland Gas was acquired. In January 2007, he tried to talk rival power retailer Origin Energy into a merger, which industry insider labelled a takeover. As Origin Energy was a 51% shareholder of Contact Energy, analysts expected that a successful merger (or takeover) would be followed by a takeover of Contact Energy, at the time the second-largest listed company in New Zealand. The merger attempt was averted in May 2006 when the Australian Takeovers Panel refused to issue a waiver to the directors of Origin Energy. Anthony was dismissed by the AGL board on 21 October 2007 after a significant reduction of the company's earnings outlook.

In 2009, he joined as head The Matrix Green Air Fund.
