= Valley Power Peaking Facility =

- Country: Australia
- Location: Traralgon
- Coordinates: 38°15′12.4734″S 146°35′19.5864″E
- Status: Operational
- Commission date: 2002

Thermal power station
- Primary fuel: Natural gas

Power generation
- Units operational: 6
- Make and model: Pratt & Whitney
- Nameplate capacity: 300 MW

The Valley Power Peaking Facility is an open cycle, gas turbine power station at Traralgon in the Latrobe Valley in Victoria, Australia. It is owned and operated by Snowy Hydro.

The plant was developed by Edison Mission Energy and Contact Energy in 2001 and 2002. The gas turbine units were relocated from the Stratford and Whirinaki power stations in New Zealand.

In 2005, it was sold to International Power and Mitsui & Co Ltd who onsold the plant to Snowy Hydro.

== See also ==
- List of power stations in Victoria
