= Electra Limited =

New Zealand electricity distribution company

Electra Limited is an electricity distribution company based in Levin, New Zealand. It manages electricity lines in the Kāpiti and Horowhenua districts of New Zealand. The company was formed in 1992 after the Energy Companies Act 1992 required the Horowhenua Electric Power Board to reform into a commercial power company. Initially known as Horowhenua Energy, the company later changed its name to Electra. More reforms in 1998 required electricity companies nationally to split their lines and retail businesses, with Electra retaining its lines business and selling its retail business to Contact Energy.

The company is 100% owned by the Electra Trust on behalf of electricity consumers in the Kāpiti and Horowhenua districts. The trust consists of six trustees elected for staggered four-year terms, with three facing election every two years. The most recent election was held in 2024.

In 2020 the company acquired a 49% share in the Quail Ridge Country Club retirement village in Kerikeri, Bay of Islands. It acquired the remaining 51% in 2023. It sold the investment in 2024 at a significant financial loss.

In 2023 the company sold its alarm-monitoring subsidiary to ADT New Zealand.

== See also ==
- Electricity sector in New Zealand
