= Contact Energy =

New Zealand electricity generating and retailing company

Contact Energy Limited
- Type: Public
- Traded as: NZX: CEN
- Industry: Electricity generation Electricity retailing Natural gas wholesaling Natural gas retailing LPG retailing
- Founded: 1996; 30 years ago
- Headquarters: Wellington, New Zealand
- Key people: Robert McDonald, Chair; Mike Fuge, Chief Executive
- Revenue: ▲NZ$2.57 billion (2021)
- Operating income: ▲NZ$187 million (2021)
- Net income: ▲NZ$185 million (2021)
- Total assets: ▲NZ$5.03 billion (2021)
- Total equity: ▲NZ$2.93 billion (2021)
- Number of employees: 945 (June 2021)
- Website: www.contact.co.nz

Contact Energy Limited is a New Zealand electricity generator, a wholesaler of natural gas, and a retailer of electricity, natural gas, broadband and LPG.

It is the second-largest electricity generator in New Zealand (after Meridian Energy), generating 23% of all electricity in 2014, and has the second-largest market share (22%) of electricity retailers (after Genesis Energy). Contact owns and operates five geothermal power stations near Taupō, natural-gas turbine facilities at Hamilton and at Stratford in Taranaki, two hydroelectric dams on the Clutha River, and a diesel fuelled station near Napier.

Contact originated with the partitioning of the Electricity Corporation of New Zealand in 1996, and publicly listed in 1999.

== History ==
Contact Energy was incorporated on 8 November 1995 and became a state-owned enterprise on 18 November 1995. It commenced operations on 1 February 1996, acquiring assets from ECNZ with a payment of $1.6 billion. The founding chief executive Paul Anthony was instrumental in establishing the corporation distinct from ECNZ.

In 1999, the company was sold, with 40% purchased by Edison Mission Energy (EME) as cornerstone shareholder for $5 per share. The remaining 60% was sold in a public offering of shares for $3.10 per share. Edison Mission Energy subsequently increased its shareholding to 51%.

As part of the 1999 electricity sector reforms, local electricity companies were split into lines and retail, with most selling the retail part. Contact Energy acquired the retail bases of Top Energy, Counties Power, Eastland Network (Gisborne area), Unison (Hawke's Bay area), Electra, Network Tasman, MainPower, Alpine Energy, Aurora Energy (Dunedin area), the Power Company and Electricity Invercargill.

Edison Mission Energy sold its shareholding to Origin Energy in 2004, following financial difficulties elsewhere in its business.

During the 2008 financial crisis, Contact Energy raised its prices by up to 12% while doubling its directors' fees. As a result, it lost more than 40,000 customers (10% of the total) in six months and its profit halved. Contact said this was the worst blow to its reputation in the company's history.

Origin Energy sold its 53% shareholding to the market in 2015, following financial difficulties elsewhere in its business.

== Power stations ==
Contact owns and operates (unless otherwise stated) the following power stations:

Name	Fuel	Type	Location	Capacity (MW)	Annual average generation (GWh)	Year commissioned
Clyde	Hydroelectric	Conventional	Clyde, Otago	464	2,050	1992
Ohaaki	Geothermal	Flash steam	Ohaaki, Waikato	70	300	1989
Poihipi	Geothermal	Flash steam	Wairakei, Waikato	55	350	1996
Roxburgh	Hydroelectric	Conventional	Roxburgh, Otago	320	1,610	1956–1962
Stratford	Gas	Open-cycle / combined-cycle turbine	Stratford, Taranaki	577	3,350	1998, 2010
Tauhara	Geothermal		North of Taupō	168		2024
Te Huka	Geothermal	Binary cycle	Taupō	23		2010
Te Mihi	Geothermal	Flash steam	North of Taupō	159		2014
Te Rapa	Gas	Open-cycle turbine. Cogeneration	Te Rapa, Waikato	44	200	2000
Wairakei	Geothermal	Flash steam / binary cycle	Wairakei, Waikato	161	1,310	1958, 2005
Whirinaki	Diesel	Open-cycle turbine	Whirinaki, Hawke's Bay	155	9	2004

=== Decommissioned stations ===
In 2001, Contact decommissioned the FT4 twinpac open cycle power stations on the Stratford and Whirinaki sites, and sold the generating equipment offshore. In June 2013, the previously decommissioned New Plymouth Power Station was sold to Port Taranaki and Methanex New Zealand. In 2016, Contact sold the Otahuhu Power Station. This was the site of Otahuhu A power station (diesel fueled open cycle gas turbines, commissioned in 1968) and Otahuhu B power station (380MW gas fueled combined cycle plant, commissioned in 2000).

== Developments ==
=== Generation developments ===
Development projects
Name	Fuel	Location	Proposed capacity (MW)	Status

=== Other developments ===
In 2001 and 2002, Contact and Edison Mission Energy developed the Valley Power Peaking Facility near Traralgon in Australia. It was sold in 2005.

In 2006, Contact and Genesis Energy set up the Gasbridge joint venture project to import LNG. Their proposed terminal at Port Taranaki was highly controversial, and the plan was shelved in favour of an offshore terminal plan in mid-2009. The project did not proceed and the venture was wound up.

Contact and Origin Energy developed the Ahuroa Gas Storage Facility at a depleted reservoir in Taranaki.

In 2012, Contact decided not to proceed with hydro developments on the Clutha River, at Queensbury, Luggate, Tuapeka and Beaumont. Development of hydro generation on Lake Hāwea was due to be completed in 2017.

In June 2013, the Taheke joint venture (Taheke 8C Incorporated and Contact Energy) decided to delay the development of the Taheke Geothermal field due to market conditions.

In August 2013, Contact decided to exit the Hauāurumā raki wind generation development on the Waikato coast. In 2016, Contact allowed its consent for the Waitahora Wind Farm near Dannevirke in the Tararua district to lapse, meaning the farm would not be built.

In 2017 Contact started selling broadband Internet access, via both fibre-optic and copper lines, bundled with other services. In 2020 Contact started using network services company Devoli as provider of the broadband service that Contact resells.

In 2021, Contact decided to proceed with development of the $580m Tauhara geothermal project. It opened in November 2024.

== See also ==
- Electricity sector in New Zealand
- New Zealand electricity market
