= Te Rapa cogeneration =

Power station in New Zealand

- Country: New Zealand
- Location: Te Rapa, Hamilton
- Coordinates: 37°42′59″S 175°13′0″E
- Status: Operational
- Commission date: 1999
- Decommission date: July 2023 (planned)
- Owner: Contact Energy
- Operator: Contact Energy

Thermal power station
- Primary fuel: Natural gas
- Cooling source: River water cooling tower
- Cogeneration?: Yes

Power generation
- Units operational: GE frame 6B
- Nameplate capacity: 44 MW

The Te Rapa cogeneration plant is a 44 MW cogeneration plant owned and operated by Contact Energy. It is located at the Fonterra dairy factory, at Te Rapa near Hamilton in New Zealand, and was commissioned in 1999.

The construction of the plant came as part of a wider upgrade to the dairy factory proposed in 1997. The original capacity applied for under the Resource Management Act was 150 MW, but there was opposition from Greenpeace about the carbon dioxide emissions and Tainui about pollution of the Waikato River; Subsequently the planned capacity was reduced to 45 MW and the change was announced at an Environment Court prehearing. The Waikato Times reported that “Greenpeace was pleased [with the change] but said even the smaller plant would pump out 100,000 tonnes of carbon dioxide”.

The plant is based on a gas turbine (a GE frame 6B) that can produce up to 44 MW of electricity. Hot exhaust gases from the turbine are ducted to a heat recovery steam generator (HRSG) to raise steam. The HRSG has duct burners to increase steam output, which can be up to 180 tons of steam per hour.

The cogeneration plant is designed for flexible operation, and can provide electricity to the dairy factory, export electricity to the local network or import electricity for use in the dairy factory. A common operating mode is 30 MW of electricity exported and 15 MW plus 120 tons per hour of steam provided to the dairy factory.

A 127 MW gas/diesel fired auxiliary boiler is used when the cogeneration plant is not in operation.

Fonterra has been authorised by the Waikato Regional Council to install and commission an alternative combustion plant if the co-generation plant ceases to be available.

== Planned closing ==
On 21 June 2022 Contact Energy announced that it would be closing the gas turbine by June 2023 when their contract to supply Fonterra with electricity expires. Mike Fuge, the CEO of Contact Energy said that "The gap in generation created by the closure of Te Rapa next year will be replaced by new, renewable generation that is set to come on stream over the coming years,"
