= Tauhara Power Station =

Geothermal station in New Zealand

- Country: New Zealand
- Location: Taupō, New Zealand
- Coordinates: 38°40′5″S 176°9′4″E
- Status: Operational
- Construction began: 31 March 2021
- Commission date: November 2024
- Owner: Contact Energy

Power generation
- Nameplate capacity: 174 MW

External links
- Website: Tauhara webpage

The Tauhara Power Station is a geothermal power station north of Taupō in New Zealand. Previously known as Tauhara 2, the project was developed by Contact Energy and Tauhara Moana Trust and opened in November 2024. At its peak it can produce up to 174 megawatts of electricity, enough to power about 200,000 homes.

== Background ==
Stage 1 of the wider Tauhara project is operational as the Te Huka Power Station. This is a 23 MW binary plant supplied with geothermal steam from the Tauhara field.

== Tauhara Stage 2 ==
The application for resource consents for a 250 MW power station was submitted in February 2010. The Minister for the Environment determined that this project was one of national significance, and referred it to an independent Board of Inquiry. The resource consents were granted in December 2010. It was the first infrastructure project to be processed under the new Board of Inquiry process administered by the Environmental Protection Authority. In August 2019 Contact Energy began drilling four wells to further characterize the geothermal reservoir on the field and inform a final decision on whether to build a new power plant.

The project was expected to cost around $580 million.

In February 2021 Contact Energy announced that it planned to issue $400 million of new shares to raise capital to build the plant.

Construction of the station began in March 2021 In February 2022 Contact announced that the completion date would be delayed to mid-2023, but that the output of the station would increase to 168 MW. In November 2023, the target for the station to be operational was pushed to the third quarter of 2024, with an output of 152 MW, rising to 174 MW later.

== See also ==
- Geothermal power in New Zealand
- List of power stations in New Zealand
