= Wairakei Power Station =

Geothermal power station in New Zealand

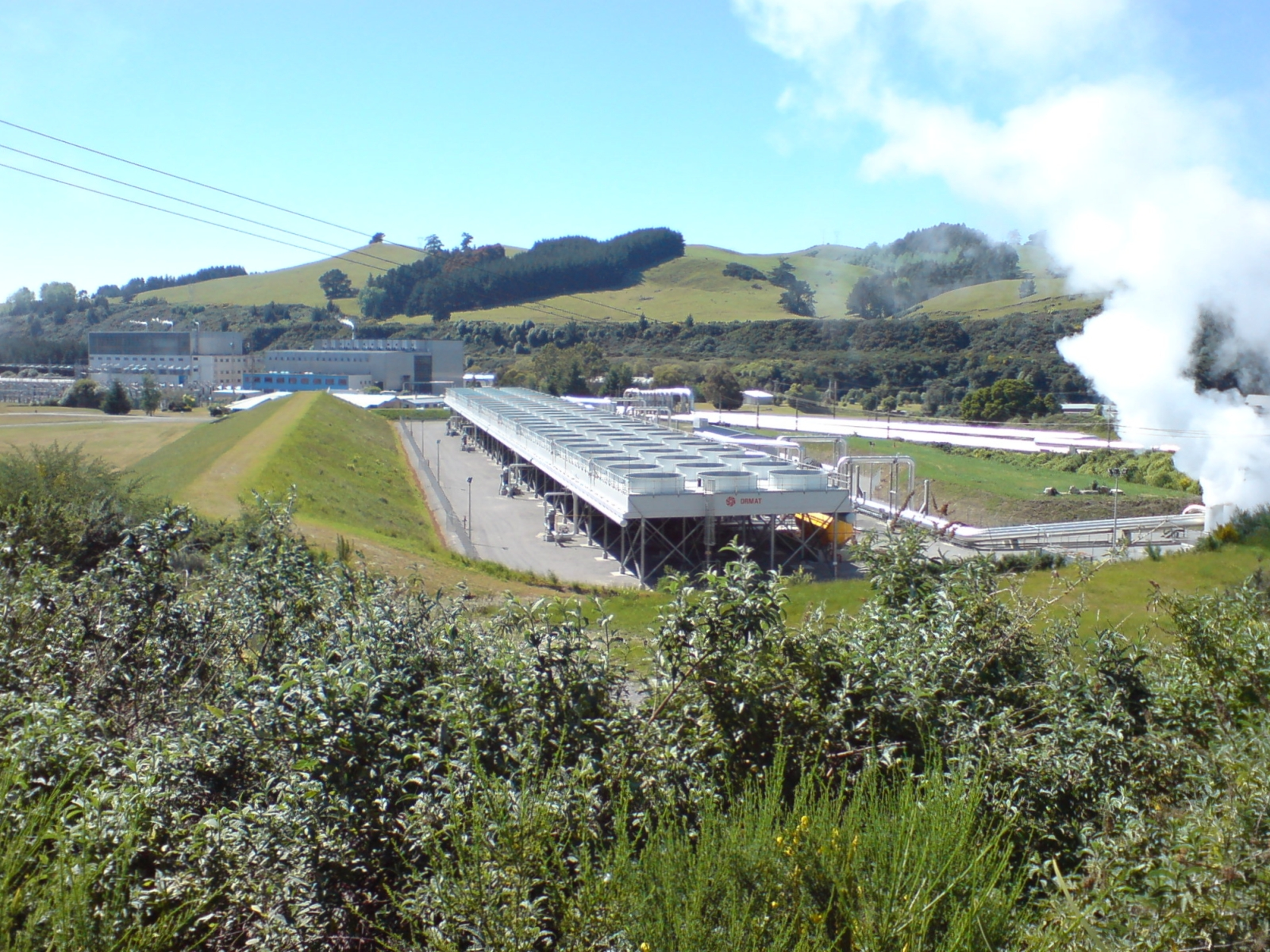
- The Wairakei Power Station, with the main two blocks at the left rear. The binary plant is in front.
- Country: New Zealand
- Location: Wairakei, north of Taupō
- Coordinates: 38°37′37″S 176°06′19″E
- Status: Operational
- Commission date: November 1958
- Owner: Contact Energy

Geothermal power station
- Type: Flash steam with binary cycle
- Wells: 55 production 6 reinjection 50 monitoring
- Max. well depth: 660 m (2,170 ft)

Power generation
- Units operational: 6× 11.2 MW; 3× 30 MW; 1× 4 MW; 1×14 MW binary
- Nameplate capacity: 175 MW
- Capacity factor: 89.0%
- Annual net output: 1365 GWh

External links
- Commons: Related media on Commons

The Wairakei Power Station is a geothermal power station near the Wairakei geothermal field in New Zealand. Wairakei lies in the Taupō Volcanic Zone.

== History ==
The power station was built in 1958, the first of its type (wet steam) in the world, and it is currently owned and operated by Contact Energy. A binary cycle power plant was constructed in 2005 to use lower-temperature steam that had already gone through the main plant. This increased the total capacity of the power station to 181 MW. The Wairakei power station is due to be phased out in 2027, replaced by the Te Mihi geothermal power station. The Poihipi Power Station was built in 1996 at a nearby site in the same field.

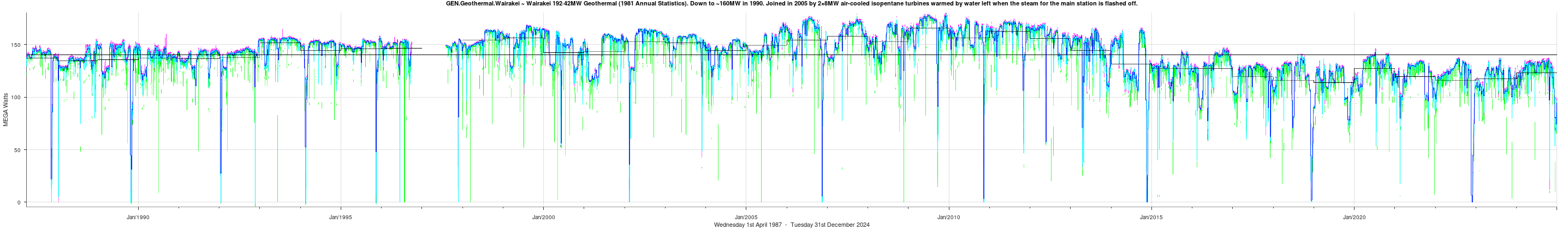
Electricity Generation at Wairakei.

== Units ==
Wairakei A station

- Unit 1 – 11.2 MW intermediate pressure
- Unit 4 – 11.2 MW intermediate pressure
- Unit 7 – 11.2 MW low pressure
- Unit 8 – 11.2 MW low pressure
- Unit 9 – 11.2 MW low pressure
- Unit 10 – 11.2 MW low pressure

Units 2, 3, 5 and 6 were decommissioned in 1984.

Wairakei B station

- Unit 11 – 30 MW intermediate/low pressure
- Unit 12 – 30 MW intermediate/low pressure
- Unit 13 – 30 MW intermediate/low pressure

Wairakei Unit 14 – 4 MW intermediate/low pressure

Wairakei Binary Plant – 14 MW binary

== Effects ==
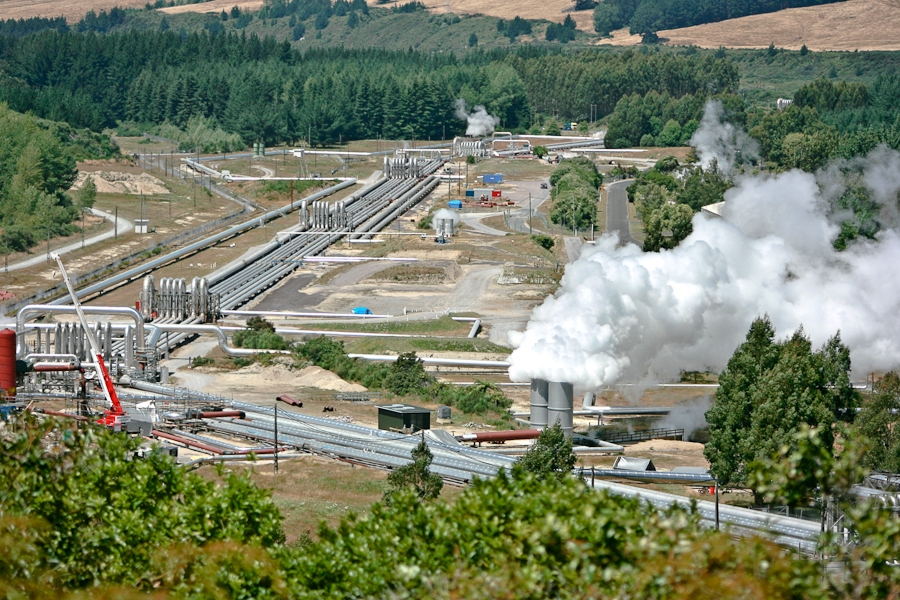
Pipes running from the Power station

The use of steam from the field has had a number of visible effects on the local environment. Visible geothermal activity has increased (due to changes in the water table / water pressure allowing more steam to be created underground, upsurging at places like Craters of the Moon), while there has also been some land subsidence and reduction in steam volumes from the field after some decades of use. Recent total electrical production has been sustained or increased with the investment in additional power stations such as the binary plant of 2005 designed for lower-temperature generation, but the total still does not reach the early power levels such as the 192MW reported in 1965 (NZED Annual Statistics), for instance. Some power stations in the field are now capped in their extraction capacities and a substantial part of the water / steam is being reinjected after use.

The hot geothermal fluid that is extracted is originally cold rainwater that had percolated downwards and been heated by hot rock; pumping back the warm water that emerges from the exhaust of the generator system thus reduces the heat drawn from the ground. The majority of arsenic in the Waikato River comes from the geothermal power station with the concentration reaching 0.035 grams of arsenic per cubic metre in certain places. The amount of arsenic gradually declines as the river flows northwards and is at its lowest at the Waikato River Heads.

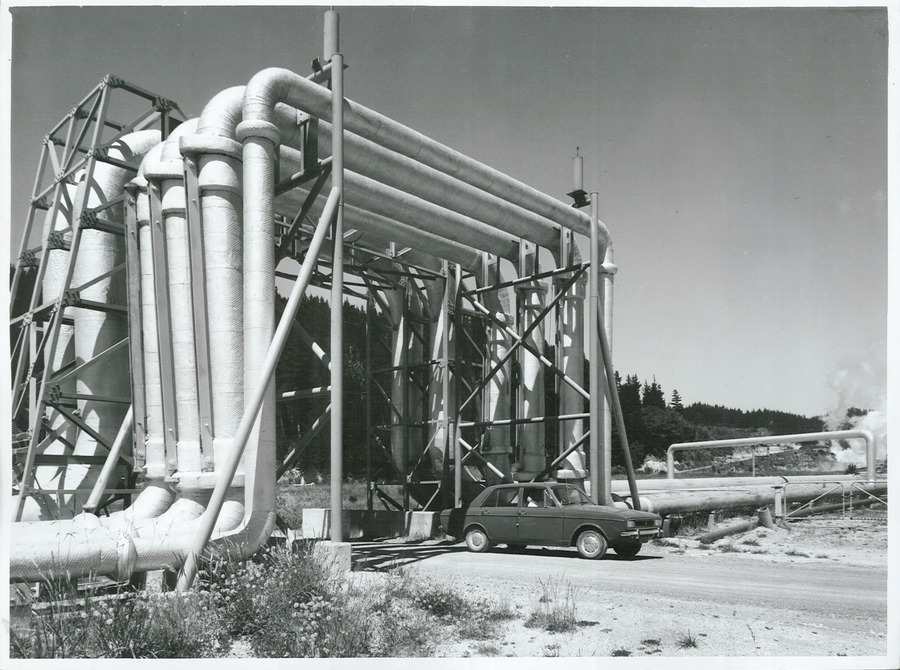
Wairakei Geothermal Valley Steam Pipes

== Transmission ==
Also at Wairakei is a major electrical substation, owned by the national grid operator Transpower. The substation is a major switching point for the Central North Island, and is responsible for connecting more than half the country's geothermal power stations, several hydroelectric power stations, the electricity supply to the entire Hawke's Bay and Gisborne regions and half of the Bay of Plenty region. A 33 kV connection at the substation supplies Unison Networks' Taupō distribution network.

== See also ==
- Geothermal power in New Zealand
- Electricity sector in New Zealand
