= Electricity sector in New Zealand =

Electricity sector of New Zealand
Data
- Peak Demand (2025): 7,194 MW
- Installed capacity (2024): 11,027 MW
- Production (2025): 43,990 GW⋅h
- Share of fossil energy: 11.6%
- Share of renewable energy: 88.4%
- GHG emissions from electricity generation (2019): 4,181 kt CO_{2}-e
- Average electricity use (2019): 8,940 kW⋅h per capita
- Transmission & Distribution losses (2024): 6.8%

Consumption by sector (% of total)
- Residential: 31.7%
- Industrial: 37.9%
- Commercial and public sector: 23.8%

Tariffs and financing
- Average residential tariff (US$/kW·h, 2020): 0.20 (NZ$0.29)

Services
- Share of private sector in generation: 36%
- Share of private sector in transmission: 0%
- Share of private sector in distribution: 100%
- Competitive supply to large users: Yes, except in isolated areas
- Competitive supply to residential users: Yes, except in isolated areas

Institutions
- Responsibility for transmission: Transpower
- Responsibility for regulation: Electricity Authority; Commerce Commission
- Electricity sector law: Electricity Act 1992; Electricity Industry Act 2010

The electricity sector in New Zealand uses almost entirely renewable energy, such as hydropower, geothermal power and increasingly wind energy. In the fourth quarter of 2025, the country generated 96.4% of its electricity from renewable sources. The strategy of electrification is being pursued to enhance the penetration of renewable energy sources and to reduce greenhouse gas (GHG) emissions across all sectors of the economy. In 2021, electricity consumption reached 40 terawatt-hours (TW⋅h), representing a 0.2% increase compared to the consumption levels in 2010.

The 2011–2021 Energy Strategy of New Zealand aimed for a 90% share of renewable electricity by 2025. In 2023, the Sixth Labour Government government raised its ambition by setting a goal of achieving 100% renewable electricity by 2030.

The Ministry of Business, Innovation, and Employment in New Zealand monitors several key entities in the electricity sector. This includes the independent regulators, the Electricity Authority and the Commerce Commission, which are responsible for the sector's regulation. Additionally, the Crown agent, the Energy Efficiency and Conservation Agency, is dedicated to promoting and managing electricity efficiency programs.

== History ==
In New Zealand electricity was first generated within factories for internal use. The first generation plant where power was transmitted to a remote location was established at Bullendale in Otago in 1885, to provide power for a twenty stamp battery at the Phoenix mine. The plant used water from the nearby Skippers Creek, a tributary of the Shotover River.

Reefton on the West Coast became the first electrified town in 1888 after the Reefton Power Station was commissioned, while the first sizeable power station—the Horahora Power Station—was built for the Waihi gold mines at Horahora on the Waikato River. This set a precedent that was to dominate New Zealand's electricity generation, with hydropower becoming and remaining the dominant source. From 1912 to 1918, the Public Works Department issued licenses for many local power stations. By 1920, there were 55 public supplies, with 45 megawatts of generating capacity between them.

Early public electricity supplies used various voltage and current standards. The 230/400-volt 50-hertz three-phase system was chosen as the national standard in 1920. At that time, 58.6% of the country's generating capacity used the 50 Hz three-phase system; 27.1% used direct current systems while 14.3% used other alternating current standards.

While industrial use quickly took off, it was only government programmes in the first two-thirds of the 20th century that caused private demand to climb strongly as well. Rural areas were particular beneficiaries of subsidies for electrical grid systems, where supply was provided to create demand, with the intention of modernising the countryside. The results were notable; in the 1920s, electricity use increased at a rate of 22% per year. In fact, the "load building" programmes were so successful that shortages started to occur from 1936 on, though a large number of new power stations built in the 1950s enabled supply to catch up again.

After the massive construction programmes had created a substantial supply of energy not dependent on international fossil fuel prices, New Zealand became less frugal with its energy use. While in 1978 its energy consumption per unit of economic output hovered around the average of all OECD countries, during the 1980s New Zealand dropped far behind, increasing its energy use per economic unit by over 25%, while other nations slowly reduced their energy usage levels. Based on this economic comparison, in 1991 the country was the second-least energy-efficient of 41 OECD countries.

All of the government's energy assets originally came under the Public Works Department. From 1946, the management of generation and transmission came under a new department, the State Hydro-Electric Department (SHD), renamed in 1958 as the New Zealand Electricity Department (NZED). In 1978, the Electricity Division of the Ministry of Energy assumed responsibility for electricity generation, transmission, policy advice and regulation. Distribution and retailing was the responsibility of local electric power boards (EPBs) or municipal electricity departments (MEDs).

New Zealand's electrical energy generation, previously state-owned as in most countries, was corporatised, deregulated and partly sold off over the last two decades of the twentieth century, following a model typical in the Western world. However, much of the generation and retail sectors, as well as the entire transmission sector, remains under government ownership as state-owned enterprises.

The Fourth Labour Government corporatised the Electricity Division as a State Owned Enterprise in 1987, as the Electricity Corporation of New Zealand (ECNZ), which traded for a period as Electricorp. The Fourth National Government went further with the Energy Companies Act 1992, requiring EPBs and MEDs to become commercial companies in charge of distribution and retailing.

In 1994, ECNZ's transmission business was split off as Transpower. In 1996, ECNZ was split again, with a new separate generation business, Contact Energy being formed. The Fourth National Government privatised Contact Energy in 1999. The Electricity Industry Reform Act 1998 required the separation of ownership between lines and energy businesses (either generation or supply). As a result, most of the former Electric Power Boards and Municipal Electricity Departments established electricity distribution businesses, and sold their electricity retail businesses, typically to generating companies. From April 1999, the remainder of ECNZ was split again, with the major assets formed into three new state-owned enterprises (Mighty River Power (now Mercury Energy), Genesis Energy and Meridian Energy) and with the minor assets being sold off. MBIE published a chronology of reforms up to 2015.

== Organisation ==
New Zealand's electricity sector is split into six distinct parts:

- Generation – Generation companies generate electricity at power stations, injecting into either transmission lines (grid-connected generation) or distribution lines (embedded generation). The electricity generated is sold via the wholesale market to retailers. Numerous companies generate power, but 92% of the generation sector is dominated by five companies: Contact Energy, Genesis Energy, Meridian Energy, Mercury Energy and Manawa Energy.
- Transmission – Transpower, a state-owned enterprise, operates the national transmission network, consisting of 11,000 kilometres (6,800 mi) of high voltage lines that connect generating stations with the grid, and supply distribution networks and large industrial consumers (direct consumers) in each of New Zealand's two main islands. The HVDC Inter-Island is a high voltage direct current link which connects the transmission networks of the two islands. Transpower as System Operator manages the electricity system in real time to ensure generation matches demand, in accordance with the rules of the electricity market.
- Distribution – Distribution companies operate 150,000 kilometres (93,000 mi) of medium and low-voltage lines interconnecting grid exit points with consumers and embedded generation. There are 29 distribution companies each serving a set geographic area.
- Retail – Retail companies buy electricity from generators and on-sell it to consumers. Numerous companies retail electricity, including many generating companies (sometimes called gentailers), but 95% of the retail sector is dominated by the five big generation companies: Contact Energy, Genesis Energy, Mercury Energy, Meridian Energy and Manawa Energy.
- Consumption – Nearly two million consumers take electricity from the distribution networks or the transmission network and buy electricity from retailers for their use. Consumers range from typical households, which consume on average 7 MW⋅h per year, to the Tiwai Point aluminium smelter, which consumed 5,000 GW⋅h in the 2017 year, representing 13% of total energy demand.
- Regulation – New Zealand's Electricity Authority (formerly the Electricity Commission) is responsible for regulation of the New Zealand electricity market. Transmission and distribution are regulated by the Commerce Commission. Policy and consumer protection is managed by the Ministry of Business, Innovation and Employment, and the promotion of energy efficiency is led by the Energy Efficiency and Conservation Authority.

=== Regulation and policy ===
Renewable energy sources generate much of the nation's electricity, with the New Zealand energy industry for example reporting a 75% share in 2013. The Fifth Labour Government of New Zealand had the goal of increasing this to 90% by 2025, the subsequent Fifth National Government put priority on security of supply.

New Zealand's Labour government introduced a number of measures in the 2000s as part of the vision of New Zealand becoming carbon neutral by 2020, and intended to collect levies for greenhouse gas emissions from 2010 onwards, to be added to power prices depending on the level of emissions. However, the incoming National government quickly tabled legislation to repeal some of these measures, such as obligatory targets for biofuel percentages, a ban on construction of new fossil fuelled generation plants and a ban on future sales of incandescent light bulbs.

From 1 January 2010, the energy sector was required to report greenhouse gas emissions under the New Zealand Emissions Trading Scheme (NZETS). From 1 July 2010, the energy sector had formal compliance obligations to buy and surrender one emission unit for every two tonnes of reported emissions. As of December 2011, there were 78 energy firms compulsorily registered in the NZETS and five voluntary participants. Energy sector firms in the NZETS do not receive a free allocation of emissions units and they are expected to pass on to their customers the costs of buying emission units.

In April 2013, the Labour Party and the Green Party said if they were to win the 2014 general election, they would introduce a single buyer of electricity akin to Pharmac (the single buyer of pharmaceutical drugs in New Zealand), in order to cut retail costs. The Government responded by calling it "economic vandalism", comparing it to the Soviet Union, but Greens co-leader Russel Norman said it would boost the economy and create jobs. By the following day, shares in privately owned power company Contact Energy had fallen by more than 10%.

New Zealand's energy policy sets targets to achieve 90% renewable electricity generation by 2025, with an aspiration to reach 100% by 2030. This is further supported by the Emissions Reduction Plan, which aims for 50% of the country's total final energy consumption (TFEC) to be sourced from renewables by 2035, encouraging widespread electrification across various sectors.

Formed in April 2018, New Zealand's Interim Climate Change Committee highlighted the importance of electrifying transport and industrial heating in its April 2019 "Accelerated Electrification" report. In response, the government launched the NZD 70 million Green Investment Finance (GIDI) Fund to facilitate the transition from coal and gas to cleaner electricity and biomass for major energy users. This initiative, designed to reduce emissions, recognizes it will both improve energy efficiency and lead to higher electricity demand.

=== Electricity market ===
New Zealand demand-weighted daily average wholesale price of electricity 2009 to 2012. Source: Electricity Authority

Electricity is traded wholesale on a spot market. The market operation is managed by several service providers under agreements with the Electricity Authority. The physical operation of the market is managed by Transpower in its role as System Operator.

Generators submit offers (bids) through a Wholesale Information and Trading System (WITS). Each offer covers a future half-hour period (called a trading period) and is an offer to generate a specified quantity at that time in return for a nominated price. The WITS system platform is run by the NZX. The System Operator (Transpower) uses a scheduling, pricing and dispatch (SPD) system to rank offers, submitted through WITS, in order of price, and selects the lowest-cost combination of offers (bids) to satisfy demand.

The market pricing principle is known as bid-based security-constrained economic dispatch with nodal prices.

The highest-priced bid offered by a generator required to meet demand for a given half-hour sets the spot price for that trading period.

Electricity spot prices can vary significantly across trading periods, reflecting factors such as changing demand (e.g. lower prices in summer when demand is subdued) and supply (e.g. higher prices when hydro lakes and inflows are below average). Spot prices can also vary significantly across locations, reflecting electrical losses and constraints on the transmission system (e.g. higher prices in locations further from generating stations).

Negative prices are not permitted in the New Zealand electricity market. However, generators may bid in a Must Run Dispatch Auction (MRDA) for the right to submit offers at $0/MWh. For all other generators, the minimum offer price is $0.01/MWh.

== Generation ==
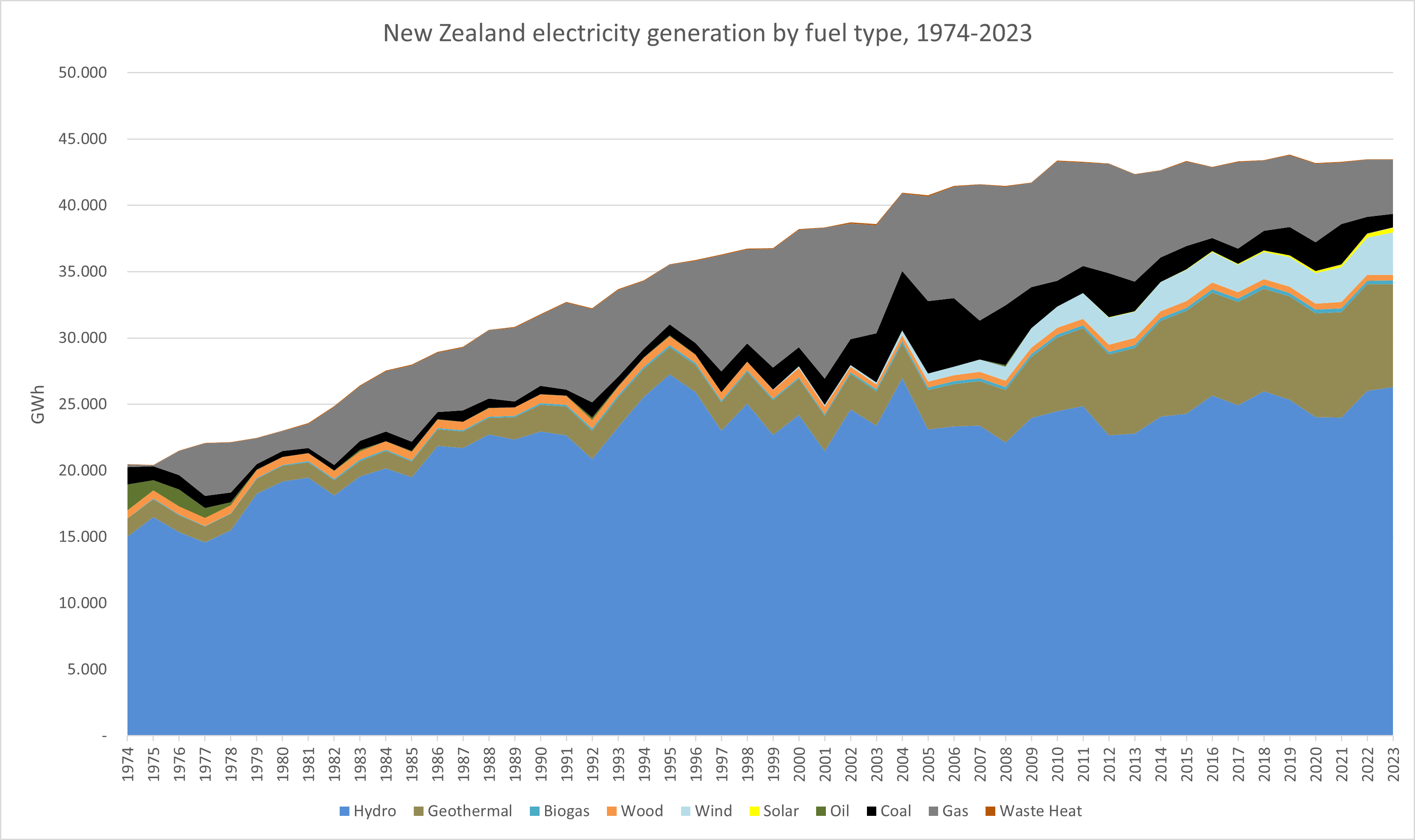
New Zealand electricity generation by fuel type, 1974–2023

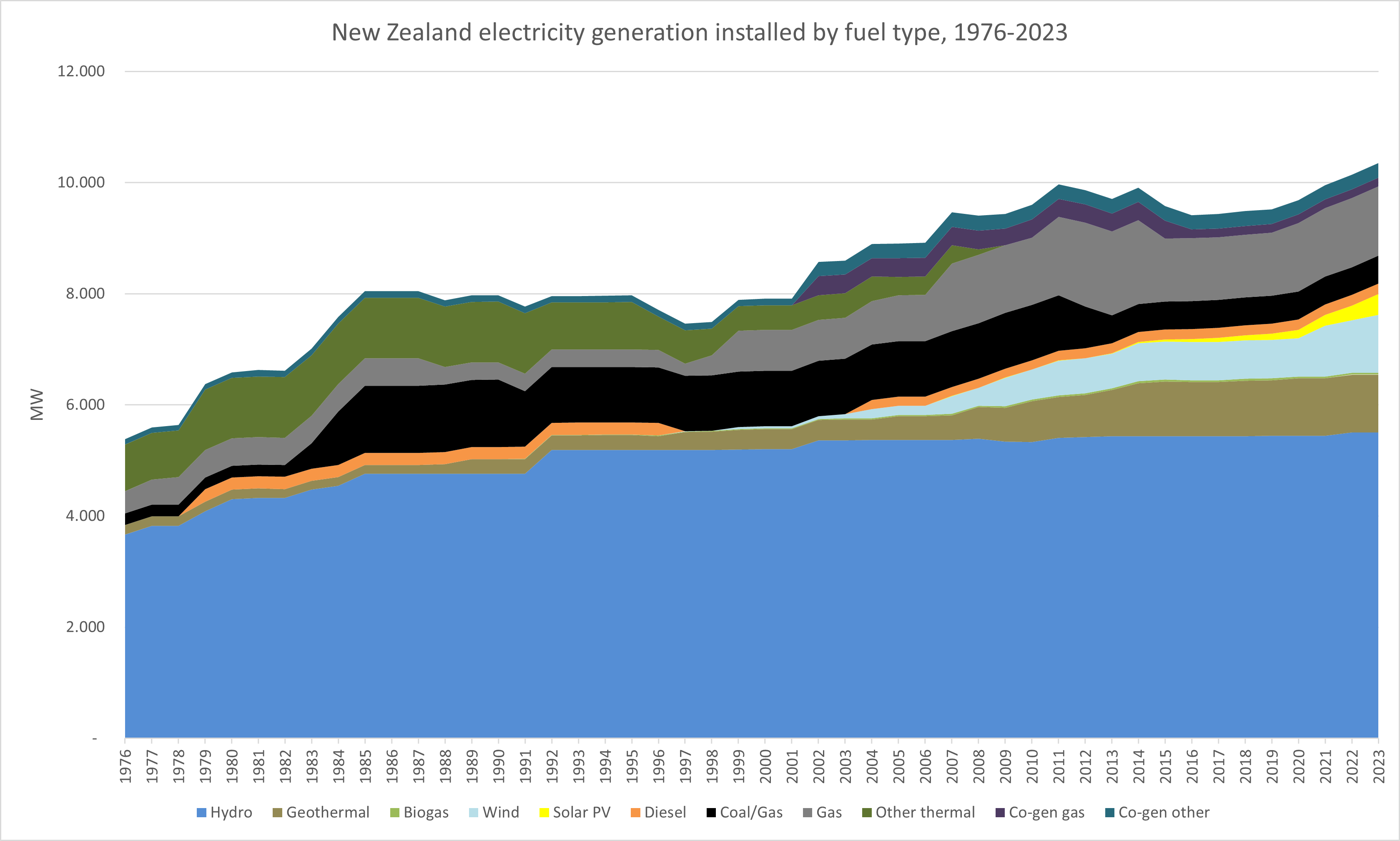
New Zealand electricity generation installed capacity, 1976–2023

In 2025, New Zealand generated 44,140 GWh of electricity, with 88.5% coming from renewable sources, the highest share since 1981. Hydroelectricity remained the largest source, while record geothermal and solar generation contributed to the increase in renewable generation.

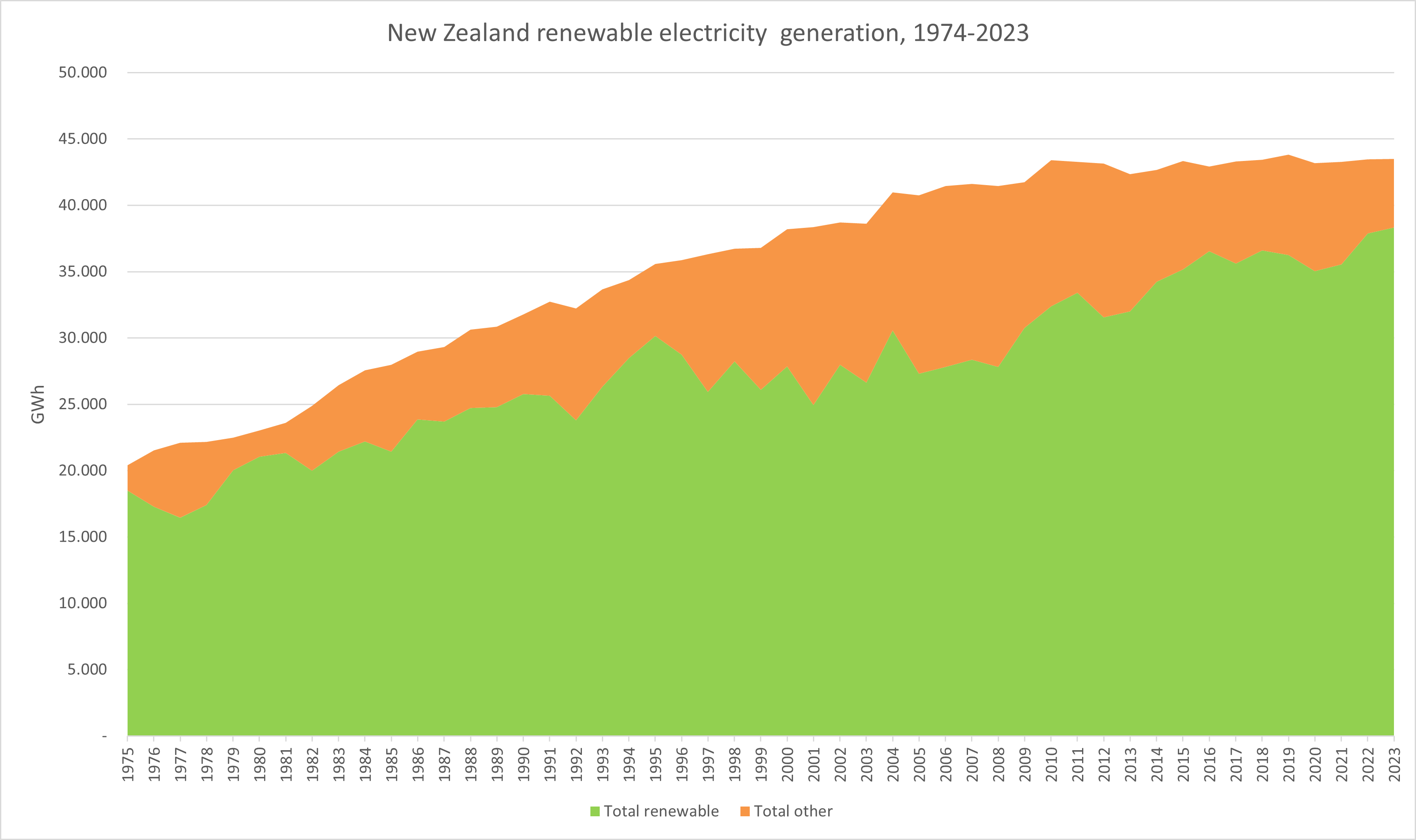
New Zealand electricity percentage renewable, 1976–2023

Installed capacity (MW) in New Zealand, 31 December 2024
| Fuel | Capacity (MW) | % capacity |
|---|---|---|
| Hydro | 5,581 | 50.6% |
| Geothermal | 1,275 | 11.6% |
| Biogas | 40 | 0.4% |
| Wind | 1,265 | 11.5% |
| Solar PV | 568 | 5.2% |
| Diesel | 198 | 1.8% |
| Coal/Gas | 500 | 4.5% |
| Gas | 1,236 | 11.2% |
| Co-Generation (Gas) | 116 | 1.1% |
| Co-Generation (Other) | 248 | 2.3% |
| TOTAL | 11,027 | |

Annual electricity generation, GW⋅h
| Year | Hydro | Geothermal | Biogas | Wood | Wind | Solar | Thermal | Total | % Renewable |
|---|---|---|---|---|---|---|---|---|---|
| 1975 | 16,497 | 1,350 | 41 | 610 | – | – | 1,926 | 20,424 | 90.6% |
| 1980 | 19,171 | 1,206 | 57 | 610 | – | – | 1,972 | 23,016 | 91.4% |
| 1985 | 19,511 | 1,165 | 105 | 640 | – | – | 6,572 | 27,992 | 76.5% |
| 1990 | 22,953 | 2,011 | 131 | 664 | – | – | 6,028 | 31,787 | 81.0% |
| 1995 | 27,259 | 2,039 | 172 | 662 | 1 | – | 5,442 | 35,575 | 84.7% |
| 2000 | 24,191 | 2,756 | 103 | 695 | 119 | – | 10,337 | 38,200 | 72.9% |
| 2005 | 23,094 | 2,981 | 190 | 446 | 608 | – | 14,206 | 41,526 | 65.8% |
| 2010 | 24,479 | 5,559 | 218 | 502 | 1,621 | 4 | 11,187 | 43,570 | 74.3% |
| 2015 | 24,285 | 7,479 | 244 | 519 | 2,340 | 36 | 8,161 | 43,334 | 81.2% |
| 2020 | 24,026 | 7,834 | 273 | 460 | 2,282 | 159 | 8,154 | 43,187 | 81.1% |
| 2025 | 23,991 | 9,547 | 305 | 254 | 3,811 | 959 | 5,087 | 43,956 | 88.4% |

=== Hydro ===
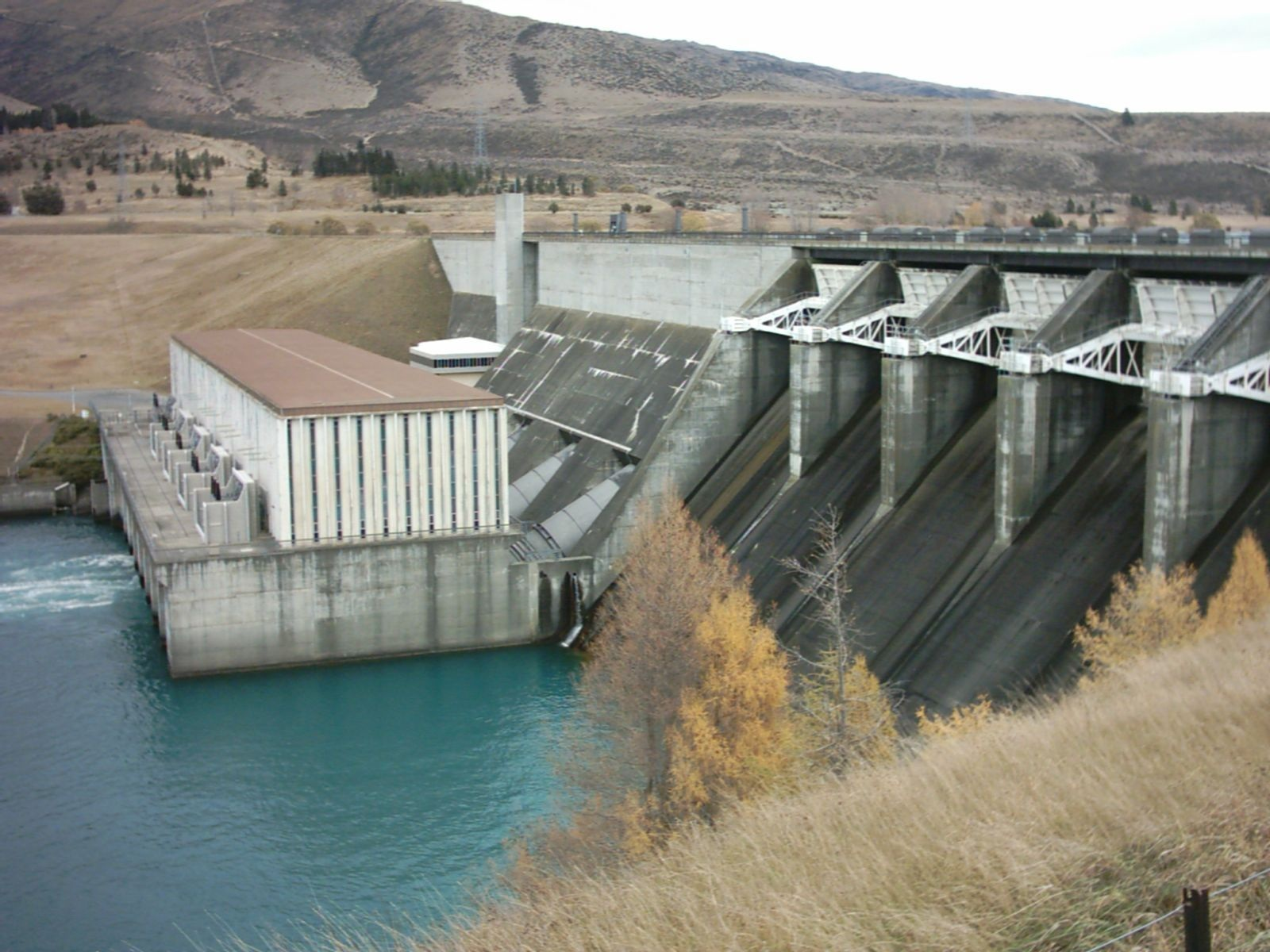
The Aviemore Dam, the penultimate hydro station on the Waitaki River hydro scheme

Hydroelectric power stations generate most of New Zealand's electricity, with 24,066 GW⋅h generated by hydroelectricity in 2020 – 56% of New Zealand's electricity generated that year. The total hydroelectricity installed capacity is 5,434 MW as at the end of 2020.

There are three major hydroelectric schemes in the South Island: Waitaki, Clutha and Manapouri. The Waitaki scheme has three distinct parts – the original Waitaki and Tekapo A power stations (1936 and 1951 respectively), the 1960s Lower Waitaki development consisting of Benmore and Aviemore, and the 1970–80s Upper Waitaki development of Tekapo B and Ōhau A, B, and C. In total, the nine powerhouses generate approximately 7600 GW⋅h annually, around 18% of New Zealand's electricity and more than 30% of all its hydroelectricity. Manapouri Power Station is a single underground power station in Fiordland, and the largest hydroelectric station in the country. It has a maximum generating capacity of 730 MW and produces 4800 GW⋅h annually, mainly for the Tiwai Point aluminium smelter near Invercargill. Both Waitaki and Manapouri are operated by Meridian Energy. There are two power stations on the Clutha River scheme operated by Contact Energy: Clyde Dam (464 MW, commissioned 1992) and Roxburgh Dam (320 MW, commissioned 1962).

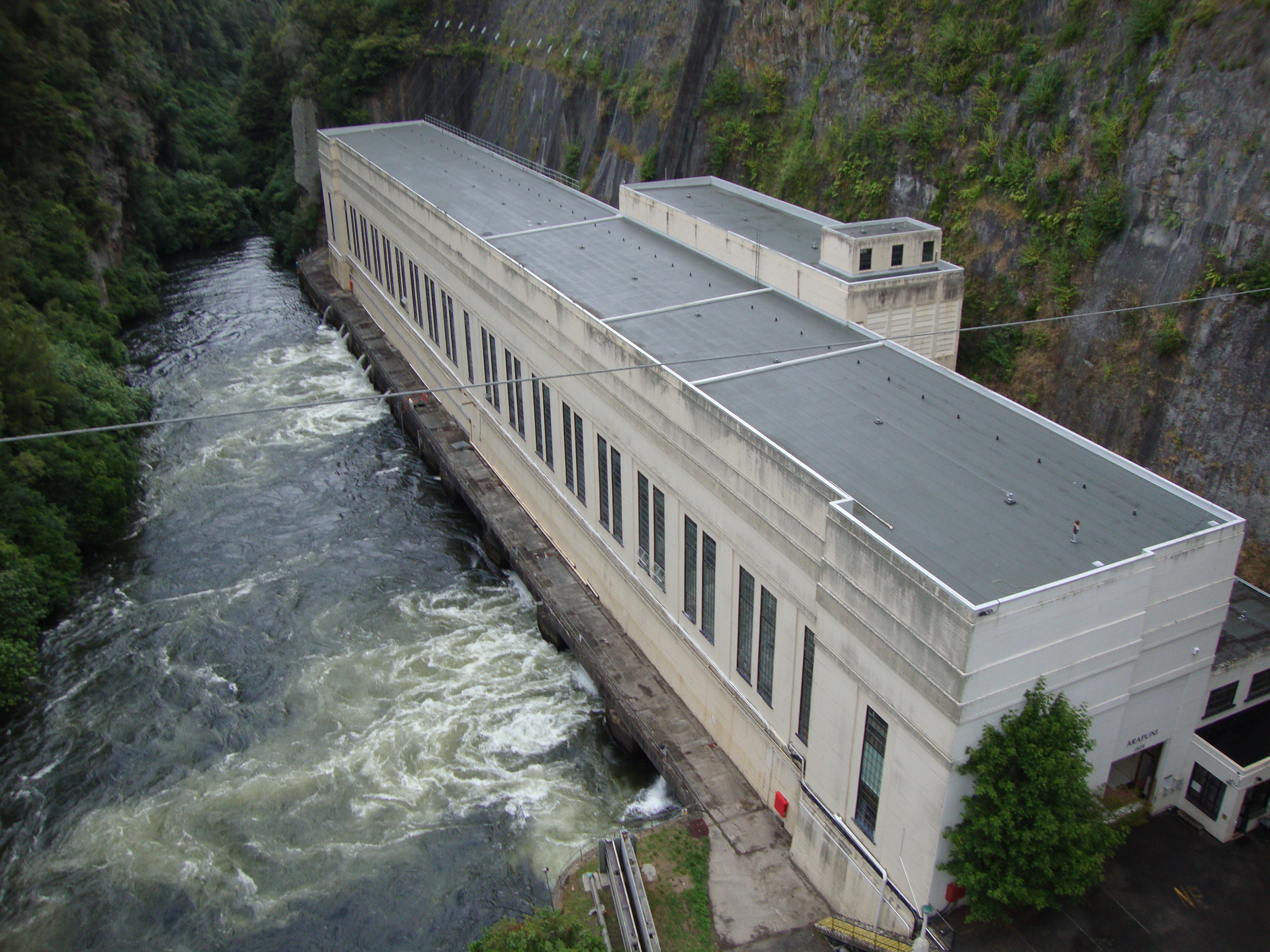
Arapuni Power Station on the Waikato River. Completed in 1929, it was the first major development after the now-closed Horahora on the Waikato River.

The North Island has two major schemes: Tongariro and Waikato. The Tongariro Power Scheme consists of water taken from the catchments of the Whangaehu, Rangitikei, Whanganui and Tongariro Rivers passing through two powerhouses (Tokaanu and Rangipo) before being deposited in Lake Taupō. The scheme is operated by Genesis Energy and has an installed capacity of 360 MW. The Waikato River Scheme, operated by Mercury Energy, consists of nine powerhouses on the river between Lake Taupō and Hamilton, generating 3650 GW⋅h annually.

Other smaller hydroelectricity facilities and schemes are scattered around both islands of mainland New Zealand.

Hydroelectric schemes have largely shaped hinterland New Zealand. Towns including Mangakino, Tūrangi, Twizel and Otematata were originally founded for workers constructing hydroelectric schemes, and their families. The hydroelectric reservoirs of Lake Ruataniwha and Lake Karapiro are world-class rowing venues, with the latter having hosted the 1978 and the 2010 World Rowing Championships. Other schemes have shaped political New Zealand. In the 1970s, the original plans to raise Lake Manapouri for the Manapouri station were scrapped after major protests. Later in the 1980s, protests were made against the creation of Lake Dunstan behind the Clyde Dam, which would flood the Cromwell Gorge and part of Cromwell township, destroying many fruit orchards and the main street of Cromwell. However, the project was given the go ahead and Lake Dunstan was filled in 1992–93.

Hydroelectricity generation has remained relatively steady since 1993 – the only major hydroelectricity projects since then was the completion of the second Manapouri tailrace tunnel in 2002, increasing the station output from 585 MW to a maximum continuous rating of 850 MW, although due to resource consent conditions, maximum generation is limited to 800 MW. No major new hydroelectric projects have been committed as of December 2011, but there are proposals for further developments on the Waitaki and Clutha Rivers, and on the West Coast of the South Island.

=== Geothermal ===
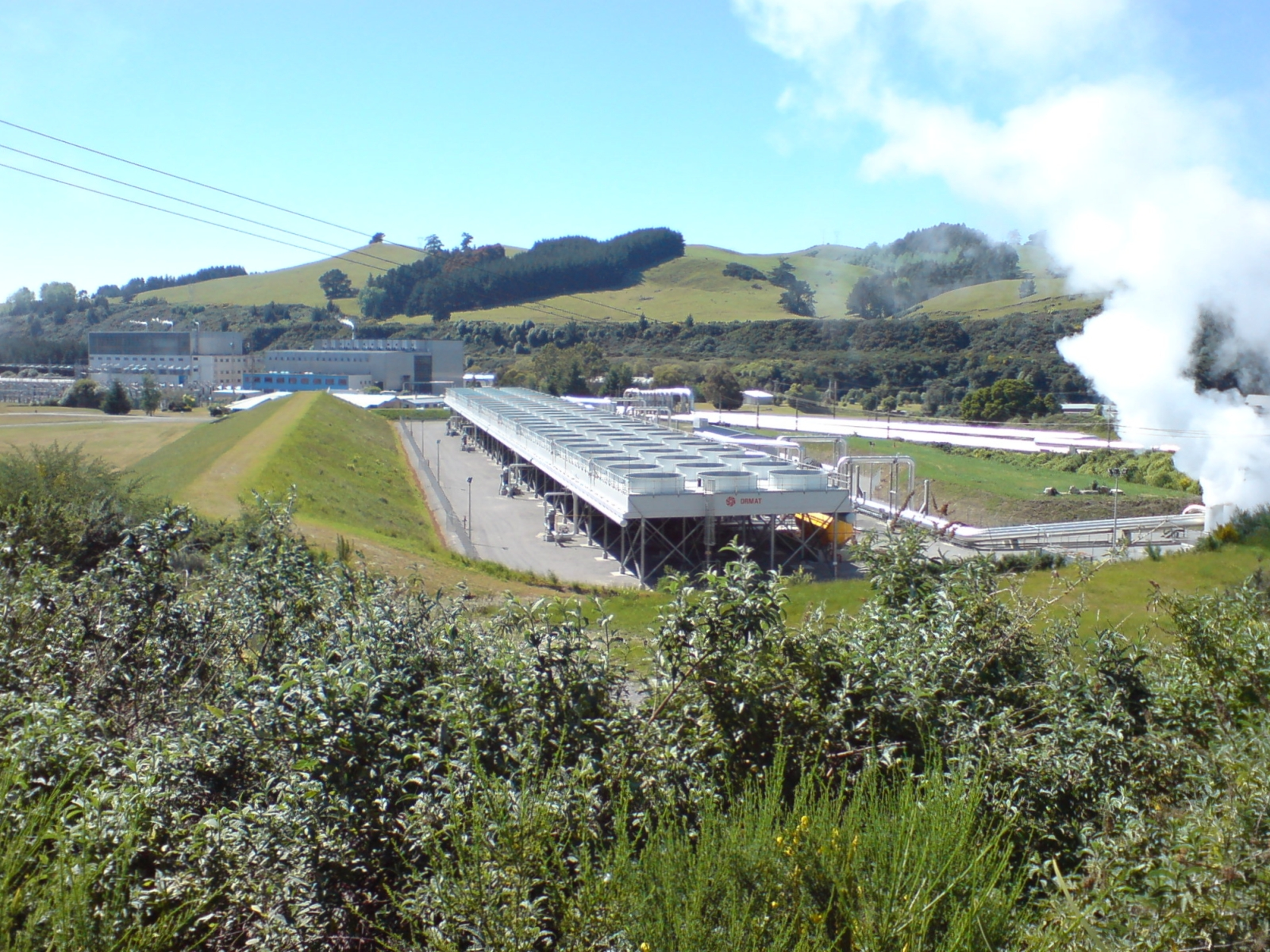
The Wairakei geothermal power plant

New Zealand lies on the Pacific Ring of Fire, so has favourable geology for geothermal power. Geothermal fields have been located across New Zealand, but at present, most geothermal power is generated within the Taupō Volcanic Zone – an area in the North Island stretching from Mount Ruapehu in the south to White Island in the north. As at December 2020, the installed capacity of geothermal power was 991 MW, and in 2020, geothermal stations generated 7,610 GW⋅h – 18% of the country's electricity generation that year.

Most of New Zealand's geothermal power is generated north of Lake Taupō. Eight stations generate electricity here, including Wairakei Power Station, New Zealand's oldest (1958) and largest (176 MW) geothermal power station, and the world's second large-scale geothermal power facility. Also in this area are Nga Awa Purua, which is home to the world's largest geothermal turbine at 147 MW (although the plant only generates 140 MW); and Ohaaki, which has a 105-metre tall hyperboloid natural draft cooling tower: the only one of its kind in New Zealand. A significant amount of geothermal electricity is also generated near Kawerau in the eastern Bay of Plenty, and a small amount is generated near Kaikohe in Northland.

Much of New Zealand's geothermal power potential still lies untapped, with the New Zealand Geothermal Association estimating an installation capacity (using only existing technology) of around 3,600 MW.

=== Wind ===
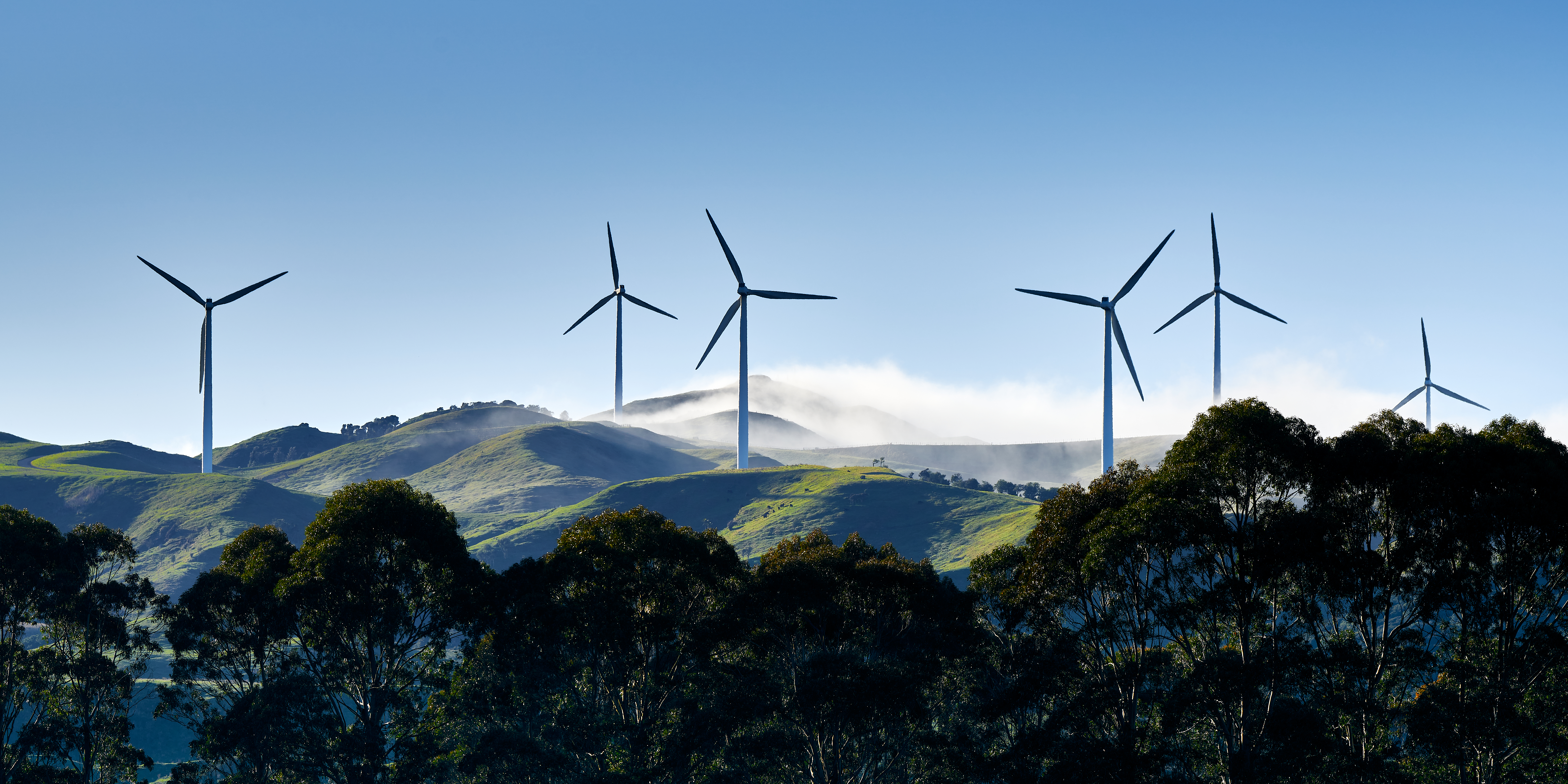
Te Āpiti Wind Farm viewed from Ashhurst Domain

Wind generated 5% of electricity in 2020. This was down from 7% in 2016 and 9% in 2015. As at end 2020, wind power accounts for 690 MW of installed capacity. Consents have been granted for wind farms with a further capacity of 2,500 MW.

New Zealand has abundant wind resources. The country is in the path of the Roaring Forties, strong and constant westerly winds, and the funneling effect of Cook Strait and the Manawatū Gorge increase the resource's potential. These effects make the Lower North Island the main region for wind generation. About 70% of the nation's current installed capacity lies within this region, with some turbines in this area having a capacity factor of over 50%.

Electricity was first generated by wind in New Zealand in 1993, by a 225 kW demonstration turbine in the Wellington suburb of Brooklyn. The first commercial wind farm was established in 1996 – the Hau Nui Wind Farm, 22 km (14 mi) southeast of Martinborough had seven turbines and generated 3.85 MW. The Tararua Wind Farm was first commissioned in 1999 with 32 MW of generating capacity, gradually expanding over the next eight years to 161 MW – the largest wind farm in New Zealand. Other major wind farms include Te Āpiti, West Wind and White Hill.

Wind power in New Zealand shares the difficulties typical to other nations (uneven wind strengths, ideal locations often remote from power demand areas). New Zealand wind farms provide on average a 45% capacity factor (in other words, wind farms in New Zealand can produce more than double their average energy during periods of maximum useful wind strengths). The Tararua Wind Farm averages slightly more than this. The New Zealand Energy Efficiency and Conservation Authority figures indicate that wind power is also expected to operate at maximum capacity for around 4,000 hours a year, much more than for example the approximately 2,000 hours (Germany) to 3,000 hours (Scotland, Wales, Western Ireland) found in European countries.

=== Fossil-fuel thermal ===
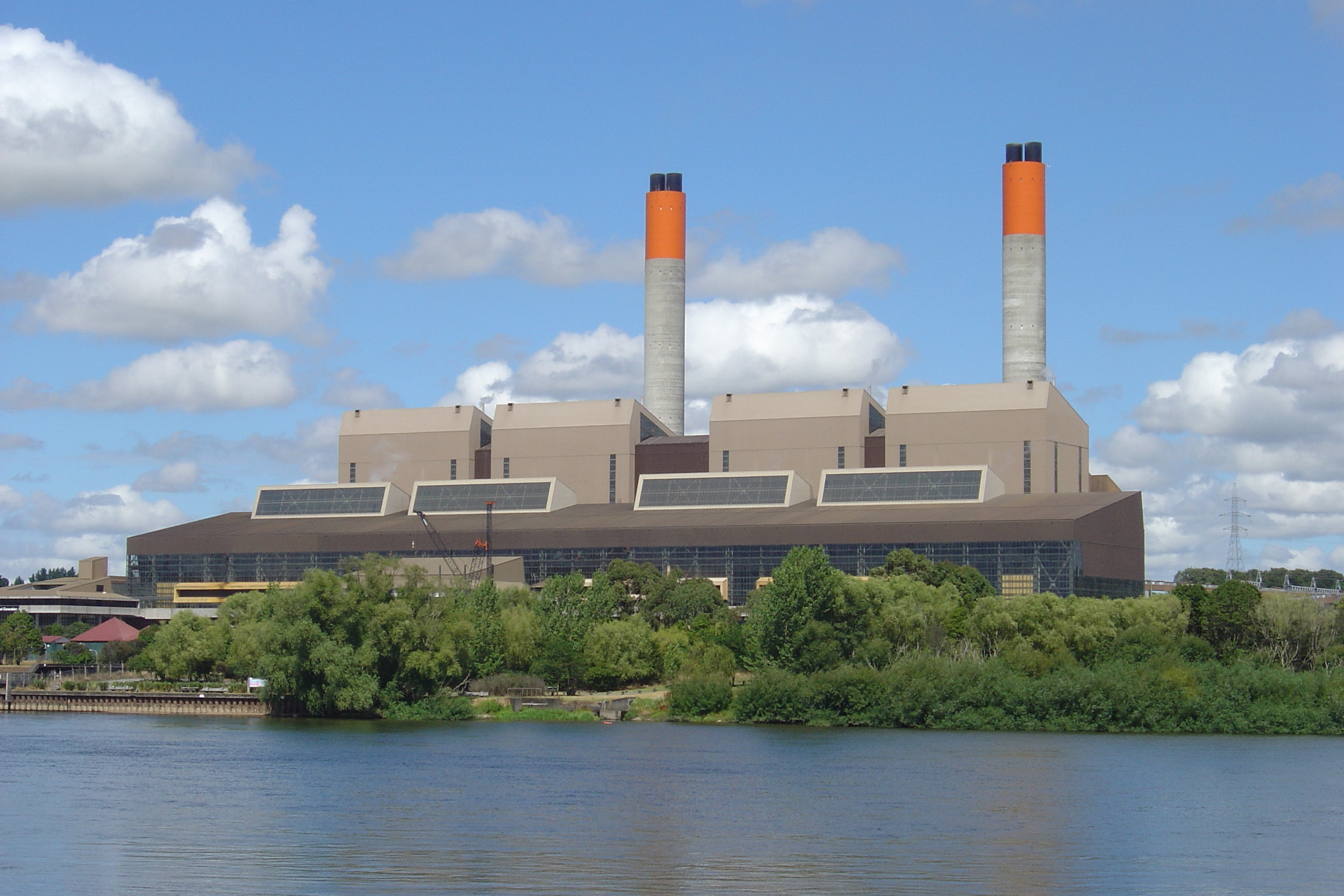
Huntly Power Station on the Waikato River. The 1435 MW facility burns coal and gas, and is the country's largest power station.

In 2020, fossil fuels generated 8,154 GW⋅h in 2020 (18.9% of all electricity); 5,938 GW⋅h by gas; 2,159 GW⋅h by coal; and 57 GW⋅h from other sources. Total combined installed capacity in 2020 was 2,334 MW. The North Island generates nearly all of New Zealand's fossil-fuelled electricity.

Until the 1950s, fossil-fuelled stations were small-scale and usually fuelled by coal or coal by-products, providing electricity to cities yet to be connected to hydro schemes and to provide additional support to such schemes. Large-scale coal-fired generation began in 1958 at the 210 MW Meremere Power Station. Oil-fired stations such as Otahuhu A, Marsden A&B, and New Plymouth were commissioned in the late 1960s and early 1970s. The discovery of natural gas off the Taranaki coast, and the oil crises of the 1970s, saw oil-fired stations converted to gas or mothballed, while gas-fired stations proliferated, especially in Taranaki and Auckland, well into the 2000s. Only in recent years has coal made a comeback, as Taranaki gas has slowly depleted.

Today, there are three major fossil-fuelled stations in New Zealand. Smaller gas- and coal-fired industrial generators are found across New Zealand and especially in Auckland, Waikato, Bay of Plenty, and Taranaki. Genesis Energy's Huntly Power Station in northern Waikato is New Zealand's largest power station – with 1000 MW of coal- and gas-fired generators and 435 MW of gas-only generators, it supplies around 17% of the country's electricity. There is a gas-fired power station in Taranaki at Stratford (585 MW). Whirinaki is a 155 MW diesel-fired station north of Napier, providing backup generation for periods when generation is not otherwise available, such as when plants break down, or during dry seasons where there is limited water for hydroelectricity generation.

As of 2021 none of the power generators appear to be committed to the construction of any new fossil-fuelled power stations. There is only one proposed thermal station with resource consent: Todd Energy's 380 MW Waikato Power Plant.

=== Other sources ===
==== Solar ====
Compared to most developed nations, New Zealand's solar generation is lagging despite an abundance of land with favourable weather. As of late April 2025, the Lauriston Solar Farm near Ashburton is New Zealand's largest operating solar farm, with a capacity of 47 MW (63 MWp). As of December 2025, New Zealand also had 410 MW of grid-connected residential solar power installed, of which 88 MW (21%) was installed in the last 12 months. Residential solar installations are low relative to other countries, representing only 1.4% of total generation vs more than 25% in Australia.

==== Marine ====
New Zealand has large ocean energy resources but does not yet generate any power from them. TVNZ reported in 2007 that over 20 wave and tidal power projects are currently under development. However, not a lot of public information is available about these projects. The Aotearoa Wave and Tidal Energy Association was established in 2006 to "promote the uptake of marine energy in New Zealand". According to their latest newsletter, they have 59 members. However the association doesn't list these members or provide any details of projects.

From 2008 to 2011, the government Energy Efficiency and Conservation Authority allocated $2 million each year from a Marine Energy Deployment Fund, set up to encourage the utilisation of this resource.

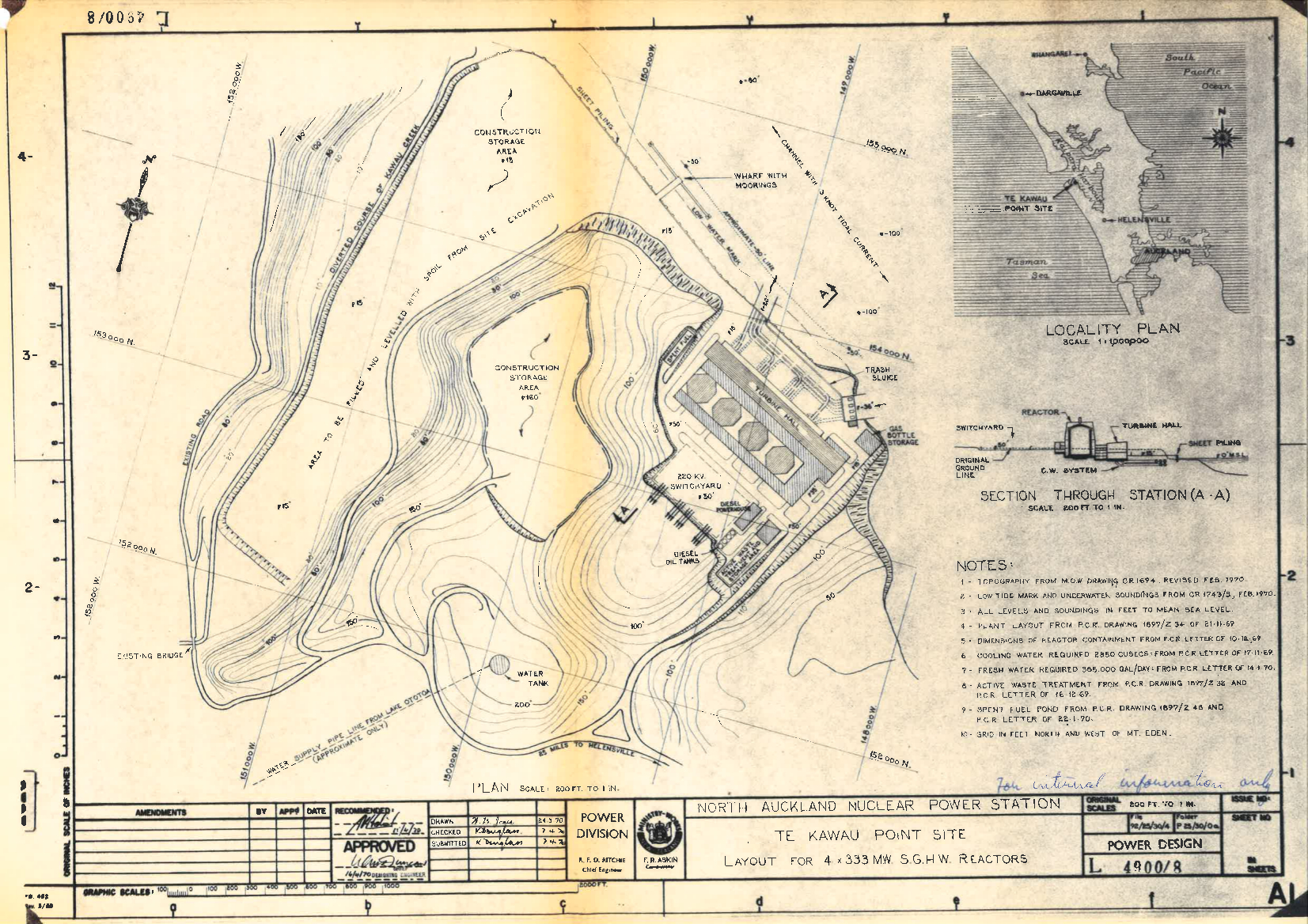
A 1960s Ministry of Works site plan for a proposed nuclear power station at Te Kawau Point on the Kaipara Harbour. The proposed station would have had four reactors with a total output of 1,332MWe.

The greater Cook Strait and Kaipara Harbour seem to offer the most promising sites for using underwater turbines. Two resource consents have been granted for pilot projects in Cook Strait itself and in the Tory Channel, and consent has been granted for up to 200 tidal turbines at the Kaipara Tidal Power Station. Other potential locations include the Manukau and Hokianga Harbours, and Te Aumiti / French Pass. The harbours produce currents up to 6 knots with tidal flows up to 100,000 cubic metres a second. These tidal volumes are 12 times greater than the flows in the largest New Zealand rivers.

==== Nuclear ====
Although New Zealand has nuclear-free legislation, it covers only nuclear-propelled ships, nuclear explosive devices and radioactive waste. The legislation does not prohibit the building and operation of a nuclear power station.

The only significant proposal for a nuclear power station in New Zealand was the Oyster Point Power Station, on the Kaipara Harbour near Kaukapakapa north of Auckland. Between 1968 and 1972, there were plans to develop four 250 MW reactors at the site. By 1972, the plans were dropped as the discovery of the Maui gas field meant there was no immediate need to embark on a nuclear programme. The Royal Commission on Nuclear Power Generation in New Zealand was set up in 1976 and reported back to the Government in April 1978. The commission concluded there was no immediate need for nuclear power in New Zealand, but may be economically possible in the early 21st century.

== Transmission ==
The major transmission network. Blue circles are generation centres. Red circles are load centres. Black lines are major AC transmission corridors. The dashed line is the HVDC Inter-Island.

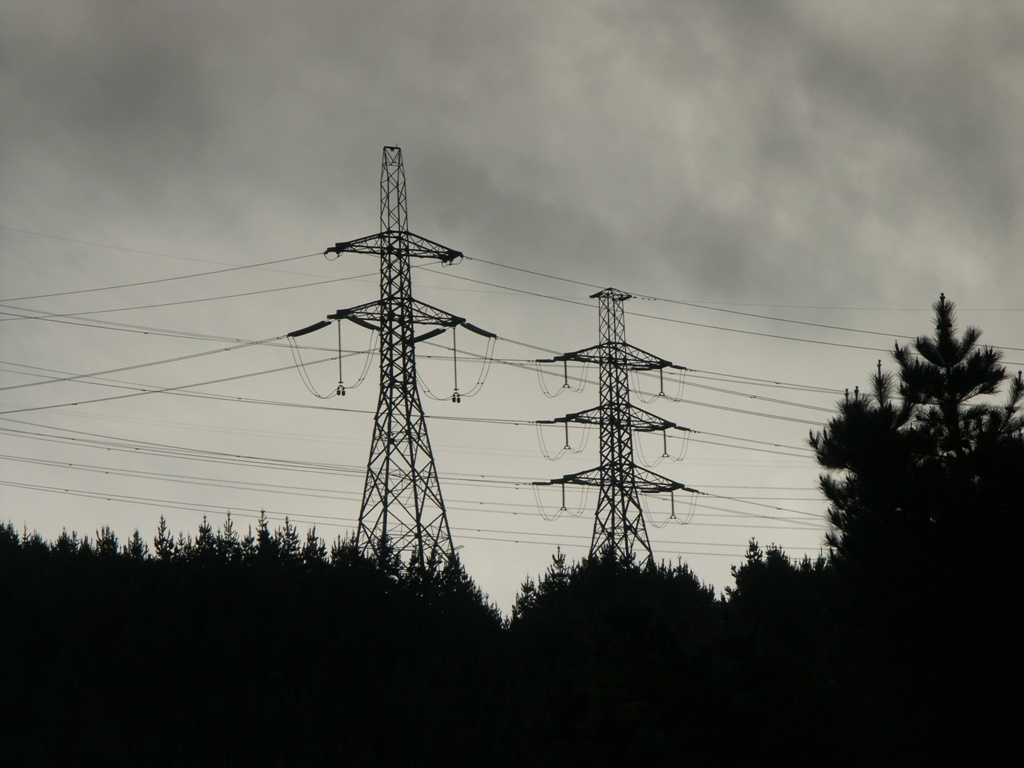
A 220 kV transmission line (back) and the HVDC Inter-Island transmission line (front) near Cook Strait in Wellington

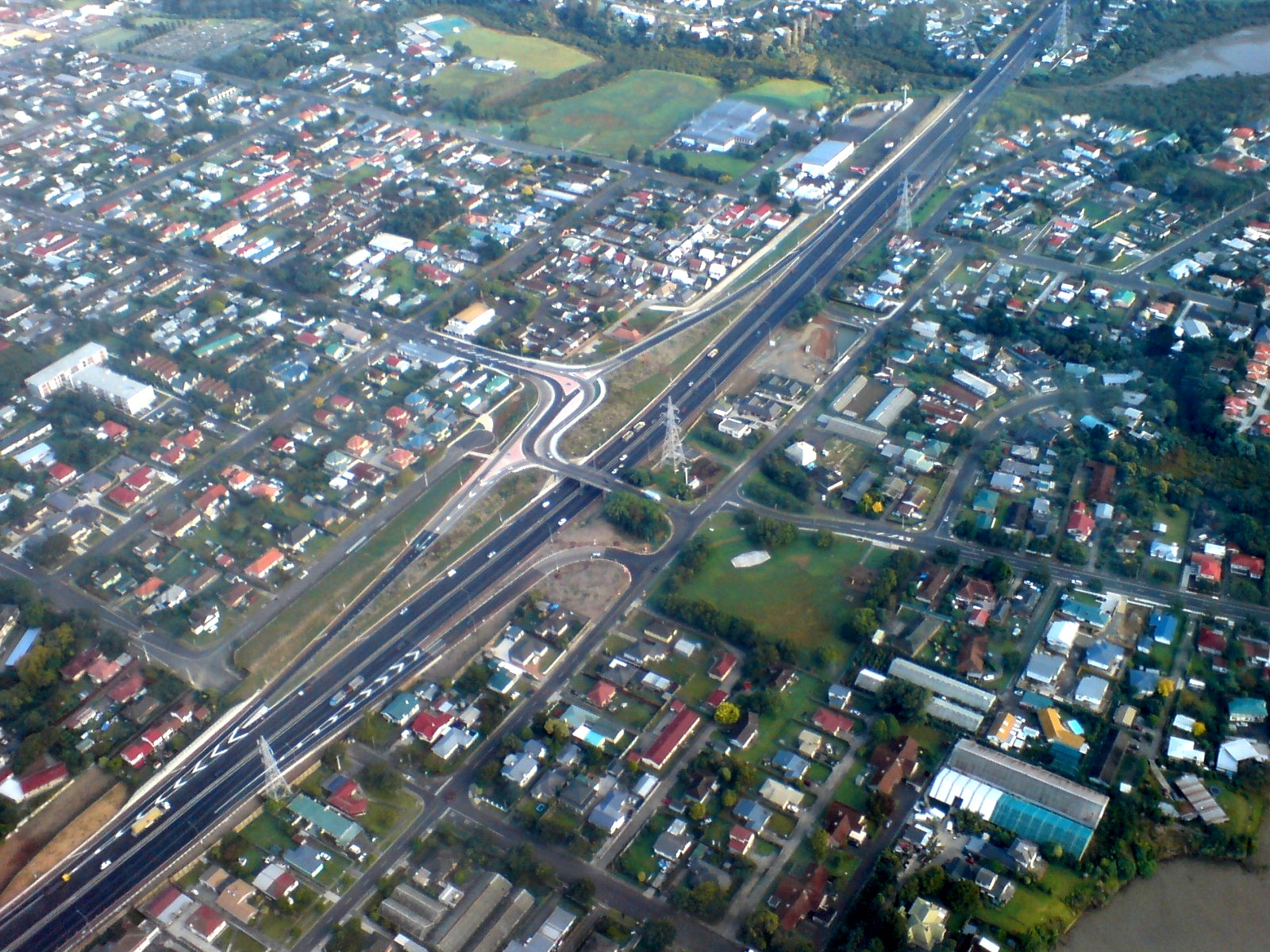
A power line following SH1 in South Auckland

New Zealand's national electricity transmission grid connects its generating facilities to its demand centres, which are often more than 150 km (93 mi) from each other. The national grid is owned, operated and maintained by state-owned enterprise Transpower New Zealand. The grid contains 10,969 kilometres (6,816 mi) route-length of high-voltage lines and 178 substations.

The first major transmission lines were built in 1913–14, connecting the Horahora hydro station to Waikino, and Coleridge hydro station with Addington in Christchurch. The interwar years saw the first major construction of a national network of 110 kV lines connecting towns and cities to hydroelectric schemes. By 1940, the transmission network stretched from Whangārei to Wellington in the North Island, and Christchurch to Greymouth and Invercargill in the South Island. Nelson and Marlborough were the last major regions to join the national grid in 1955. The 220 kV network began in the early 1950s, connecting the Waikato River dams to Auckland and Wellington, and Roxburgh Dam to Christchurch. The two islands were joined by the HVDC Inter-Island link in 1965. The first 400 kV transmission line was completed between Whakamaru Dam on the Waikato River and Brownhill substation east of Auckland in 2012, but presently is operated at 220 kV.

=== Existing grid ===
The backbone of the grid in each island is the network of 220 kV transmission lines. These lines connect the larger cities and power users with the major power stations. Lower capacity 110 kV and 66 kV transmission lines connect smaller towns and cities and smaller power stations, and are connected to the 220 kV core grid through points of interconnection at major transmission substations. These stations include Otahuhu and Penrose in Auckland, Whakamaru, Wairakei and Bunnythorpe in the central North Island, Haywards in Wellington, Islington and Bromley in Christchurch, and Twizel and Benmore in the Waitaki Valley.

Investments in new transmission are regulated by the Commerce Commission. In a news release in January 2012, the Commerce Commission reported that Transpower was planning to invest $5 billion over the next 10 years in upgrades of critical infrastructure.

Since 2006, Transpower has spent nearly $2 billion reinforcing the supply into and around Auckland. A 400 kV-capable transmission line was completed in 2012, linking Whakamaru to Brownhill substation in Whitford, east of Auckland, with 220 kV cables linking Brownhill to Pakuranga. In 2014, a new 220 kV cable was commissioned between Pakuranga and Albany (via Penrose, Hobson Street and Wairau Road), forming a second high-voltage route between northern and southern Auckland.

=== HVDC Inter-Island ===
The HVDC Inter-Island scheme is New Zealand's only high voltage direct current (HVDC) system, and links the North and South Island grids together.

The link connects the South Island converter station at the Benmore Dam in southern Canterbury with the North Island converter station at Haywards substation in the Hutt Valley via 572 kilometres (355 mi) of overhead bipolar HVDC lines and 40-kilometre (25 mi) submarine cables across Cook Strait.

The HVDC link was commissioned in 1965 as a ±250 kV, 600 MW bipolar HVDC scheme using mercury-arc valve converters, and was originally designed to transfer surplus South Island hydroelectric power northwards to the more populous North Island. In 1976, the control system of the original scheme was modified to allow power to be sent in the reverse direction, from Haywards to Benmore, allowing the South Island to access the North Island's thermal generation during dry periods.

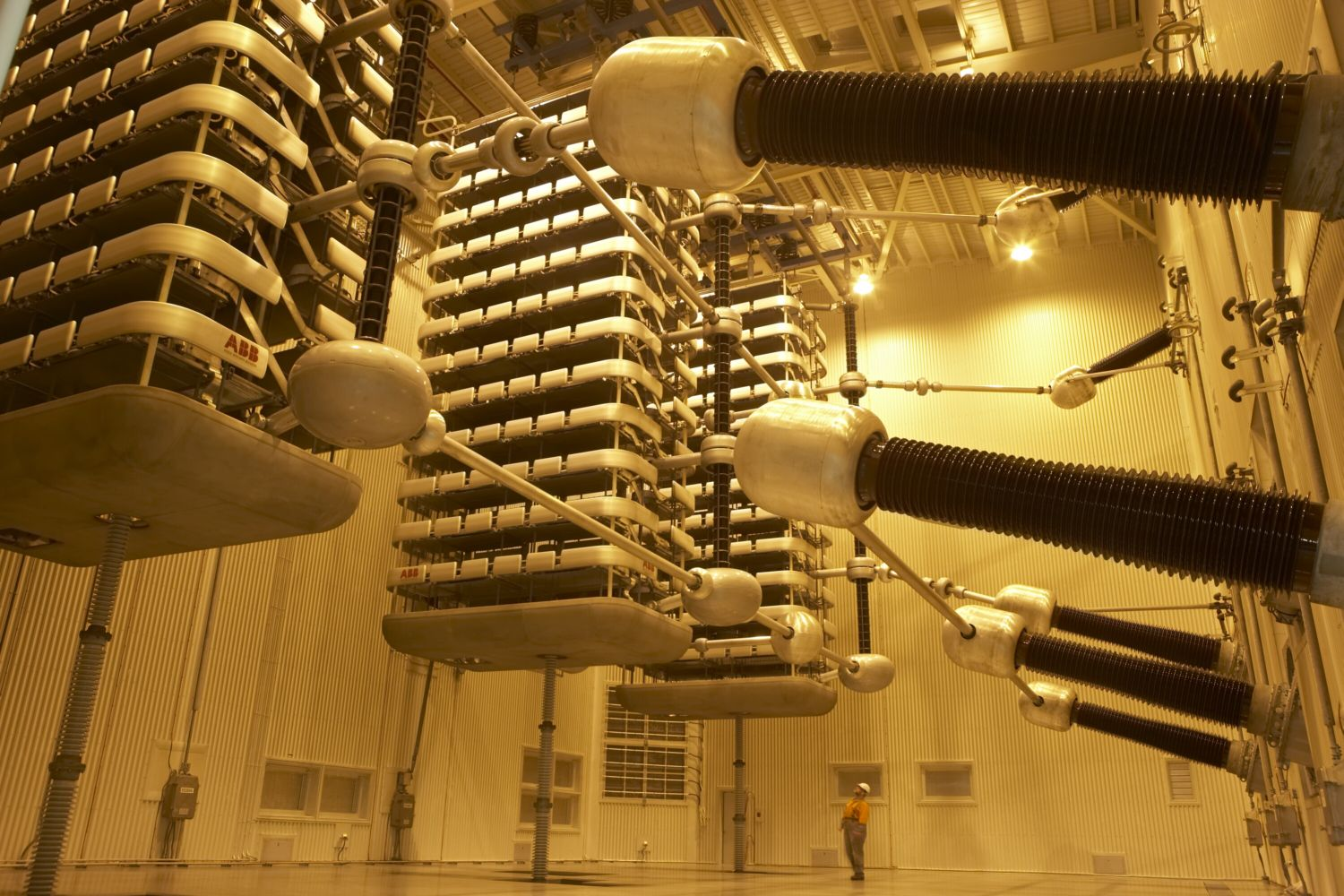
Haywards Pole 2 thyristor valve during maintenance shutdown

In 1992, the original mercury-arc equipment was paralleled to create a single pole (Pole 1), and a new thyristor-based pole (Pole 2) was commissioned alongside it. The transmission lines and submarine cables were also upgraded to double the link's maximum capacity to 1240 MW. The mercury-arc valve converter equipment was partially decommissioned in 2007, and fully decommissioned in August 2012. New thyristor converter stations (known as Pole 3) were commissioned on 29 May 2013, to replace the mercury arc converters. Further work to Pole 2 brought the link's capacity to 1200 MW by the end of the year.

== Distribution ==
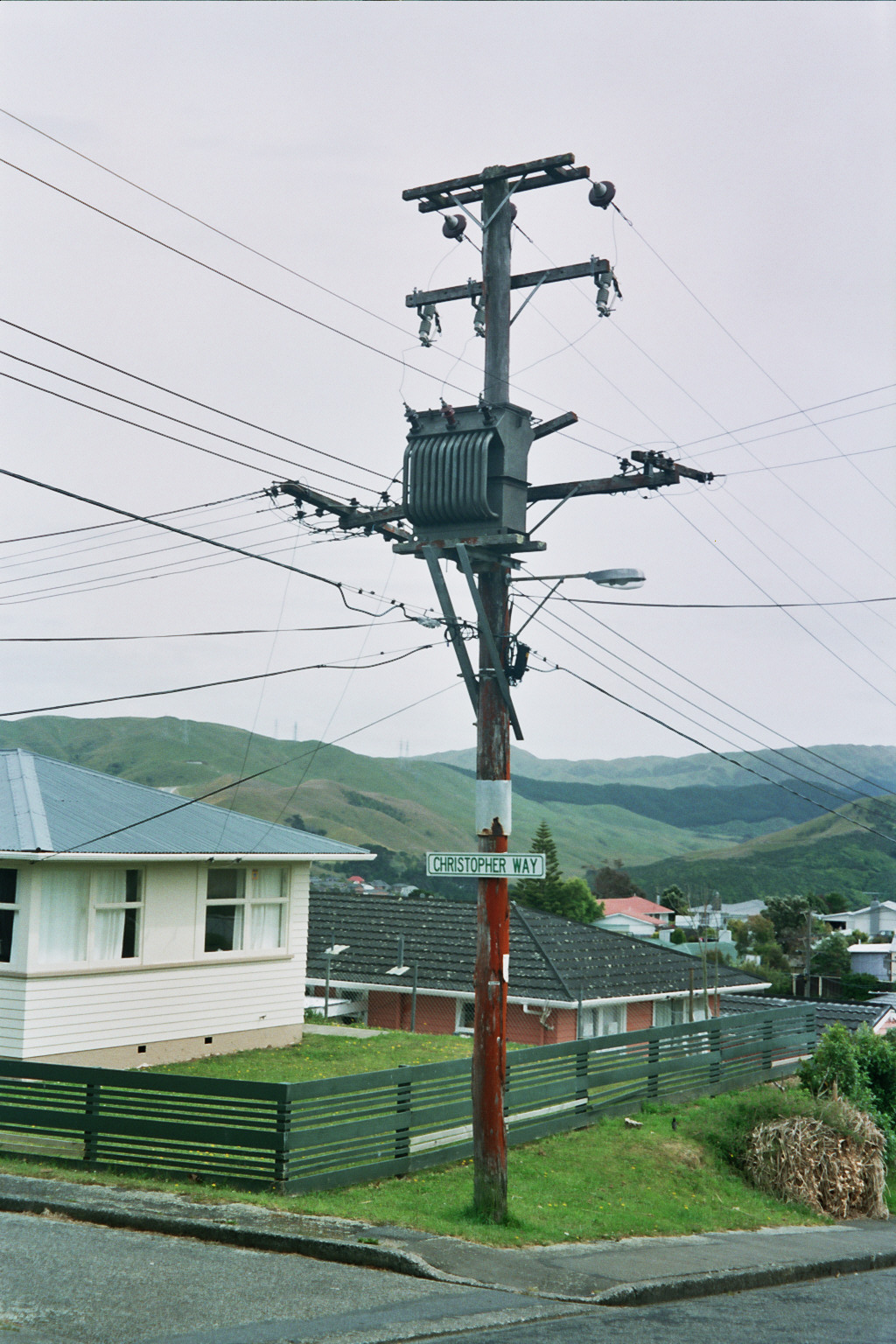
A distribution transformer mounted on a power pole in Wellington

Electricity from Transpower's national grid is distributed to local lines companies and large industrial users via 180 grid exit points (GXPs) at 147 locations. Large industrial companies, such as New Zealand Steel at Glenbrook, the Tasman Pulp and Paper Mill at Kawerau, the Tiwai Point Aluminium Smelter near Bluff, and KiwiRail for its 25 kV AC electrification in Auckland and the central North Island, draw directly from Transpower substations and not the local lines companies' local grids.

Distribution of electricity to local consumers is managed by of one of 29 electricity distribution businesses (EDBs). Each EDB serves specific geographic regions. The 29 electricity distribution businesses differ widely in scale, ranging from Buller Electricity with 4,757 customer connections and a regulatory asset base of $33 million, through to Vector with 593,440 customer connections and a regulatory asset base of $3,645 million.

In most areas, the local lines company operates a subtransmission network, connecting the transmission grid exit point to zone substations. At the zone substation (or at the GXP if there is no subtransmission network), the voltage is stepped down to distribution voltage. Three-phase distribution is available in all urban and most rural areas. Single- or two-phase distribution utilising only two phases or single wire earth return systems are used in outlying and remote rural areas with light loads. Local pole-mounted or ground-mounted distribution transformers step-down the electricity from distribution voltage to the New Zealand mains voltage of 230/400 volts (phase-to-earth/phase-to-phase).

Subtransmission is typically at 33 kV, 50 kV, 66 kV or 110 kV, although parts of Auckland isthmus use 22 kV subtransmission. Distribution is typically at 11 kV, although some rural areas and high-density urban areas use 22 kV distribution, and some urban areas (e.g. Dunedin) use 6.6 kV distribution.

As of 31 March 2022, the 29 EDBs combined had 11,825 km (7,348 mi) of subtransmission lines and cables and 145,659 km (90,508 mi) of distribution and low-voltage lines and cables. There were 1,305 zone substation transformers, 197,724 distribution transformers, and 1,370,759 power poles.

=== Regulation of distribution businesses ===
Electricity distribution businesses are natural monopolies, and are subject to regulation under Part 4 of the Commerce Act 1986. There are two main regulatory mechanisms in place; information disclosure regulation and price-quality regulation.

==== Information disclosure regulation ====
Each year, the Commerce Commission requires EDBs to publish financial information including financial statements, future expenditure forecasts and pricing, and performance information including outages and interruptions. The Commerce Commission publishes analysis of the information disclosures to assist industry analysts and members of the public to understand and compare the performance of EDBs.

==== Price-quality regulation ====
Price-quality regulations set the maximum revenue or maximum average price an EDB can charge consumers as well as the quality standards they must meet, usually measured in the frequency and duration of power outages. EDBs who fail to meet these standards may be given a public warning, and repeat failures may result in prosecution. In March 2020, Aurora Energy was fined nearly $5 million after four consecutive years where it failed to meet the required quality standards, largely resulting from historic under-investment in network renewal and maintenance.

The following EDBs are subject to price-quality regulation for the 2020–2025 period:

- Alpine Energy
- Aurora Energy
- Centralines
- Firstlight Network
- Electricity Ashburton
- Electricity Invercargill
- Horizon Energy
- The Lines Company
- Network Tasman
- Nelson Electricity
- Orion
- OtagoNet Joint Venture
- Powerco
- Top Energy
- Unison Networks
- Vector
- Wellington Electricity

The following EDBs meet criteria for "consumer-owned" businesses and are exempt from price-quality regulation:

- Buller Electricity
- Counties Power
- Electra
- MainPower
- Marlborough Lines
- Network Waitaki
- Northpower
- Scanpower
- The Power Company Limited
- Waipā Networks
- WEL Networks
- Westpower

=== Low voltage supply ===
Dual switched power point outlet

Distribution companies provide supply at a nominal voltage of 230 volts ± 10% for single-phase and 400 volts ± 10% for three-phase supply, except for momentary fluctuations, in accordance with the Electricity (Safety) Regulations 2010. AC power plugs (male) and sockets (female) comply with the harmonised Australian and New Zealand standard AS/NZS 3112 that is also used in Fiji, Tonga, Solomon Islands, Papua New Guinea and several other Pacific island countries.

New Zealand uses a variation on the TN-C-S earthing system known as multiple earthed neutral (MEN). Each consumer premises is required to have its own earth electrode, which connects to the protective earth busbar in the main distribution board. The neutral wire is connected to earth at the distribution transformer, and within each consumer's main distribution board by an electrical connector between the neutral busbar and the protective earth busbar known as the MEN link.

== Consumption ==
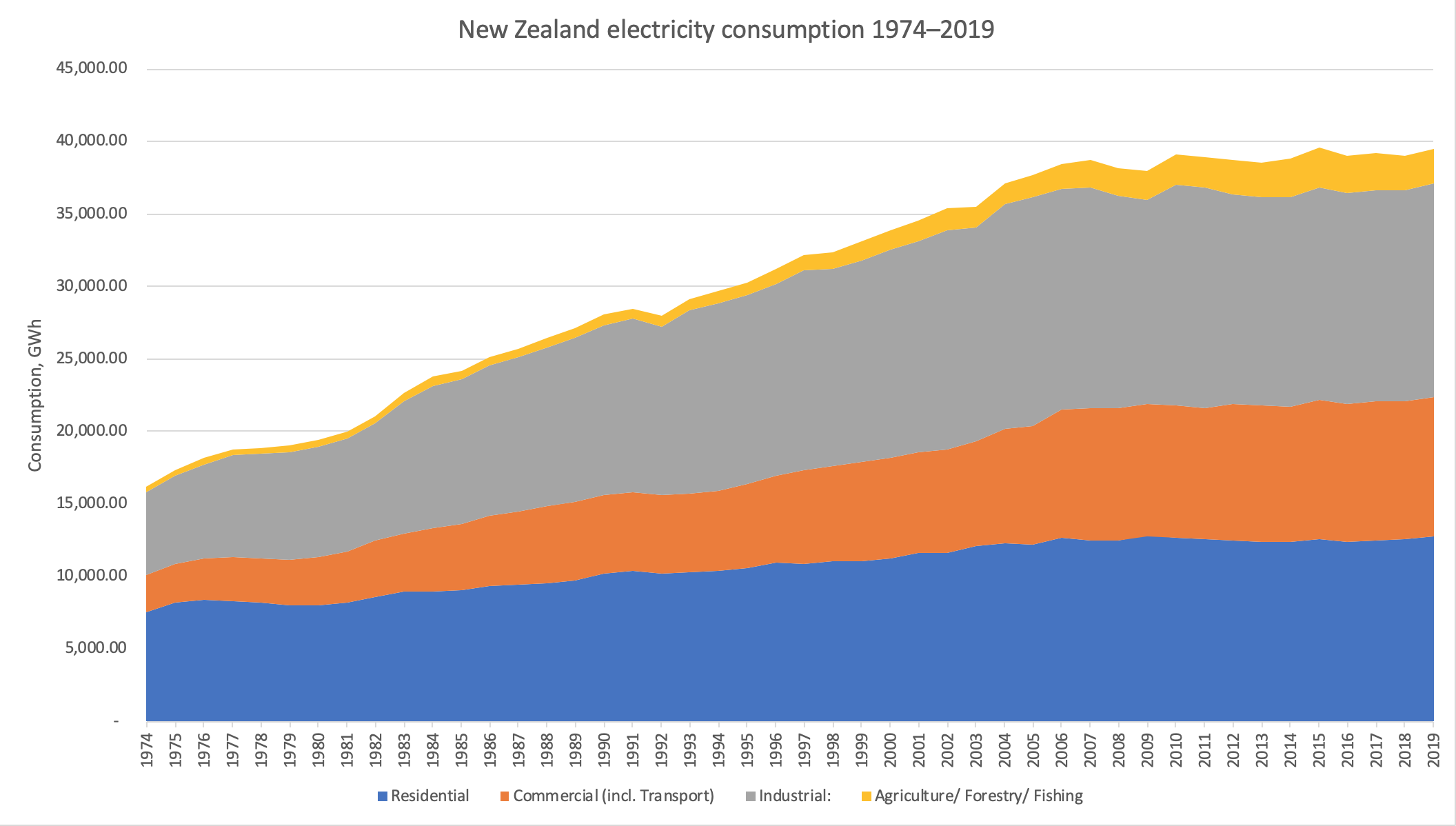
New Zealand electricity consumption 1974–2019

In 2023, New Zealand consumed 39,950 GW⋅h of electricity. Industry consumed 34.5% of that figure, agriculture 6.2%, commerce 24.0%, and homes 34.6%. As at 31 May 2021, there were 2,210,593 connections to the national electricity network.

The highest half-hourly electricity demand recorded in New Zealand was 7,304 MW, between 18:00 and 18:30 on Wednesday 2 August 2023. The lowest half-hourly demand in the ten years to December 2025 was 2,638 MW, between 03:30 and 04:00 on Monday 13 April 2020 (Easter Monday) during the nationwide COVID-19 lockdown.

New Zealand's largest single electricity user is the Tiwai Point Aluminium Smelter in Southland, which can demand up to 640 megawatts of power, and annually consumes around 5400 GW⋅h. The smelter effectively has the Manapouri power station as a dedicated power generator to supply it. Other large industrial users include the Tasman pulp and paper mill at Kawerau (175 MW demand), and New Zealand Steel's Glenbrook mill (116 MW demand).

The other major consumers are the cities, with Auckland, the nation's largest city, demanding up to 1722 MW and consuming 8679 GW⋅h in 2010–11. Wellington, Christchurch, Hamilton and Dunedin are also major consumers, with other large demand centres including Whangarei-Marsden Point, Tauranga, New Plymouth, Napier-Hastings, Palmerston North, Nelson, Ashburton, Timaru-Temuka, and Invercargill.

Annual highest and lowest half-hour electricity demand in New Zealand, 2005–25
| Year | Highest demand half-hour | | Lowest demand half-hour | |
| Year | Demand | Half-hour beginning | Demand | Half-hour beginning |
|---|---|---|---|---|
| 2005 | 6364 MW | 11 July, 17:30 | 2730 MW | 25 December, 04:30 |
| 2006 | 6644 MW | 29 June, 17:30 | 2690 MW | 26 December, 04:30 |
| 2007 | 6852 MW | 20 June, 17:30 | 2752 MW | 2 January, 03:00 |
| 2008 | 6620 MW | 18 August, 18:00 | 2552 MW | 26 December, 03:30 |
| 2009 | 6762 MW | 29 June, 17:30 | 2770 MW | 2 January, 03:30 |
| 2010 | 6702 MW | 9 August, 18:00 | 3018 MW | 26 December, 04:00 |
| 2011 | 7080 MW | 15 August, 18:00 | 3016 MW | 26 December, 04:00 |
| 2012 | 6710 MW | 2 July, 17:30 | 3030 MW | 11 March, 04:00 |
| 2013 | 6704 MW | 15 July, 18:00 | 2940 MW | 28 December, 03:30 |
| 2014 | 6644 MW | 22 June, 17:30 | 2842 MW | 2 January, 03:30 |
| 2015 | 6698 MW | 23 June, 18:00 | 3028 MW | 6 April, 03:30 |
| 2016 | 6696 MW | 8 August, 18:00 | 3062 MW | 27 March, 04:00 |
| 2017 | 6830 MW | 13 July, 17:30 | 3074 MW | 19 March, 04:00 |
| 2018 | 6952 MW | 26 June, 17:30 | 3012 MW | 26 December, 03:30 |
| 2019 | 6820 MW | 5 August, 18:00 | 3178 MW | 2 January, 03:30 |
| 2020 | 6860 MW | 8 July, 18:00 | 2638 MW | 13 April, 03:30 |
| 2021 | 7278 MW | 9 August, 18:00 | 2974 MW | 4 January, 03:30 |
| 2022 | 7090 MW | 25 July, 17:30 | 2980 MW | 26 December, 03:30 |
| 2023 | 7304 MW | 2 August, 18:00 | 3034 MW | 19 March, 03:30 |
| 2024 | 7042 MW | 5 July, 08:00 | 3036 MW | 26 December, 03:30 |
| 2025 | 7194 MW | 25 July, 08:00 | 3000 MW | 2 January, 03:30 |

Electricity consumption in New Zealand (by sector, 2024 calendar year)
| Category | Consumption | |
| Category | (PJ) | (GW⋅h) |
|---|---|---|
| Agriculture, Forestry and Fishing | 9.97 | 2,770 |
| Agriculture | 9.60 | 2,670 |
| Forestry and Logging | 0.21 | 58 |
| Fishing | 0.15 | 42 |
| Industrial | 48.52 | 13,480 |
| Mining | 1.73 | 480 |
| Food Processing | 11.21 | 3,110 |
| Textiles | 0.45 | 120 |
| Wood, Pulp, Paper and Printing | 3.85 | 1,070 |
| Chemicals | 1.84 | 510 |
| Non-metallic Minerals | 0.93 | 260 |
| Basic Metals | 20.32 | 5,640 |
| Mechanical and Electrical Equipment | 0.55 | 150 |
| Building and Construction | 1.45 | 400 |
| Other/unallocated | 6.89 | 1,910 |
| Commercial | 33.19 | 9,220 |
| Transport | 1.20 | 330 |
| Residential | 50.65 | 14,070 |
| Total | 143.92 | 39,980 |

== Retail and residential supply ==
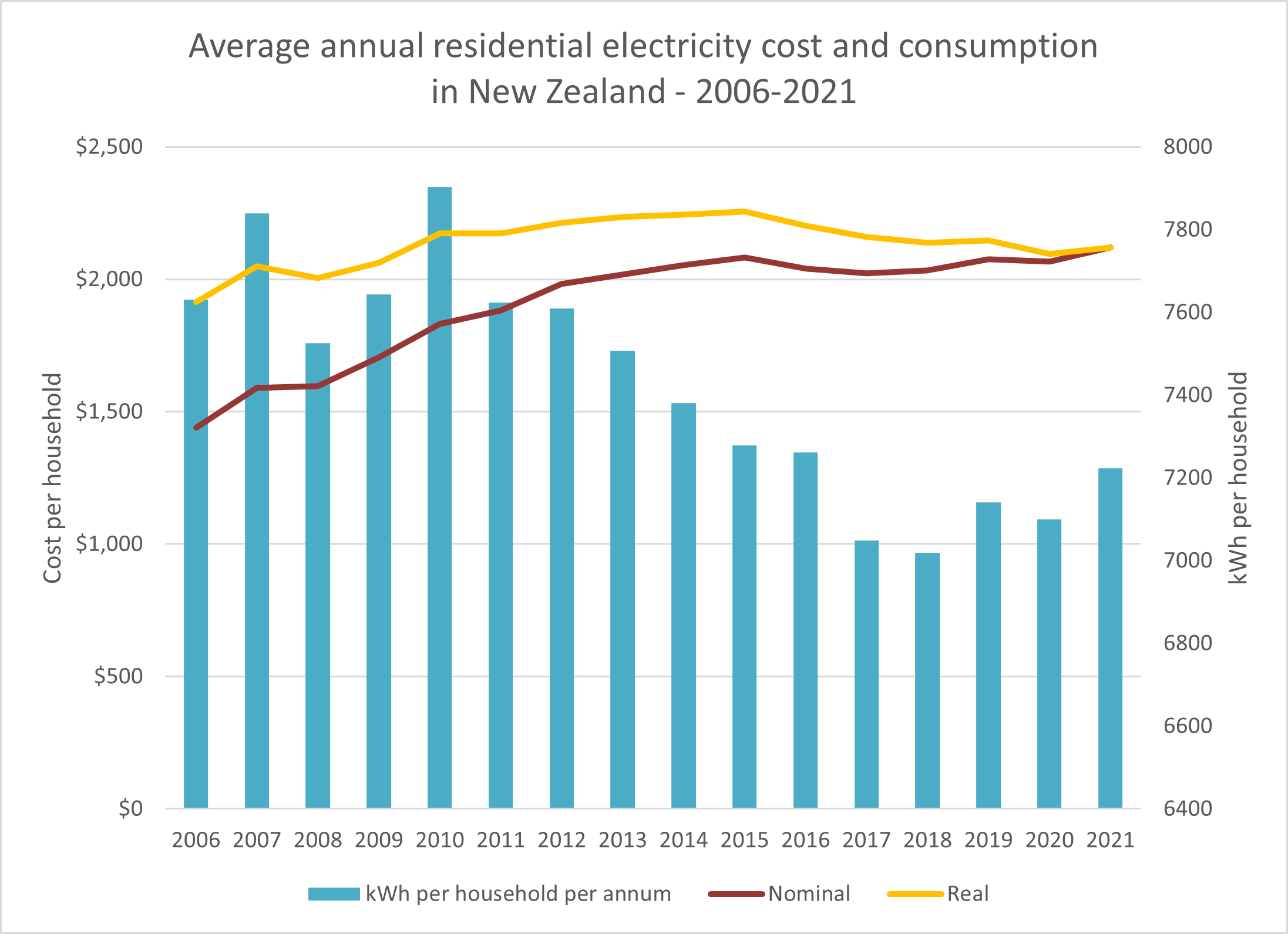
Annual residential electricity cost and consumption in New Zealand for the period 2006 – 2021

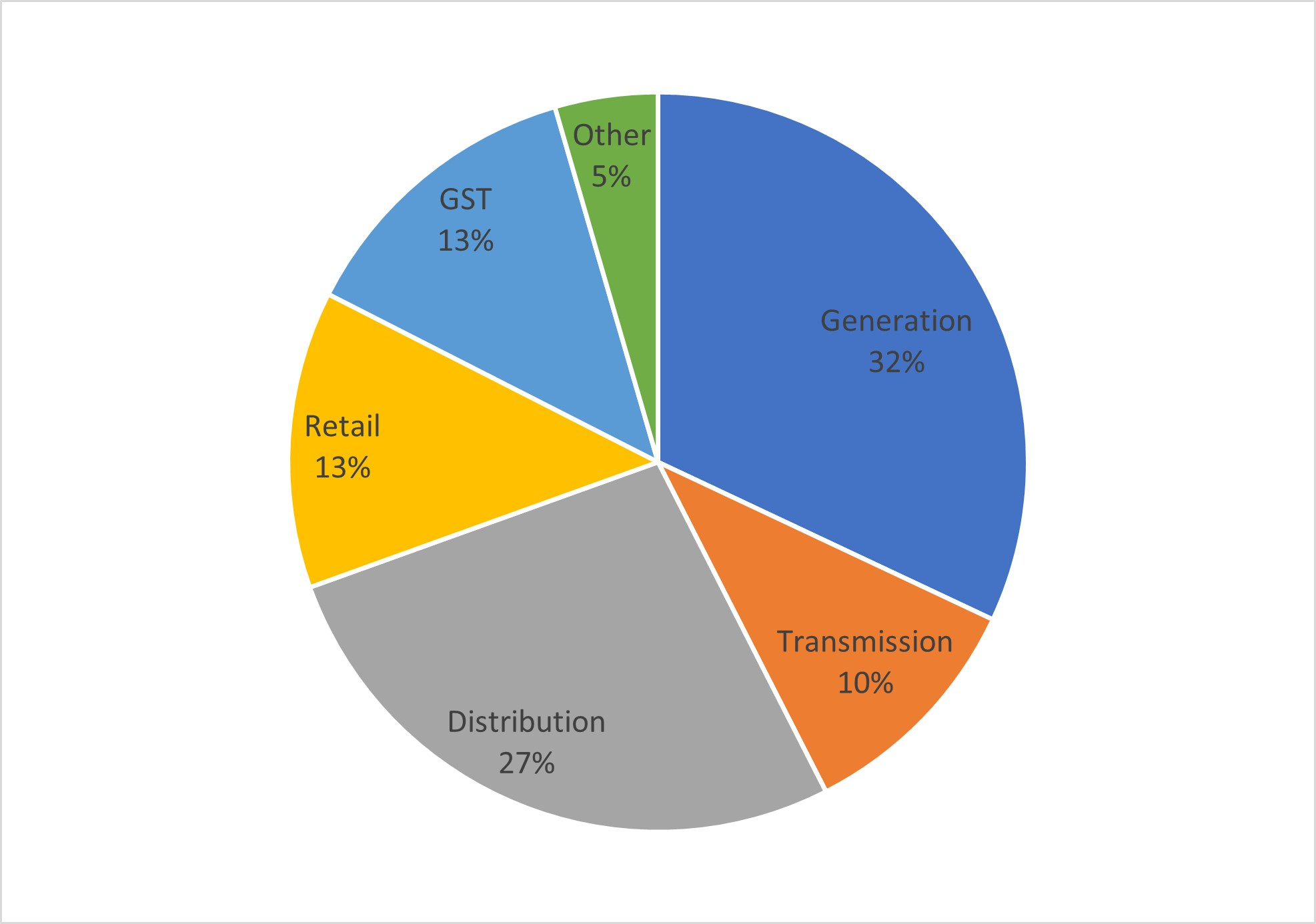
Residential electricity cost breakdown 2021

The total residential electricity consumption in 2020 was around 12.9 TW⋅h.

Average annual household consumption shows a generally downward trend over the period from 2006 to 2021. Average annual household expenditure on electricity has been relatively stable in real terms, increasing by approximately 11% over the same period. In 2021, the average annual residential consumption was 7,223 kW⋅h per household, varying from 5,938 kW⋅h per household on the West Coast to 8,467 kW⋅h per household in Southland. The average annual household expenditure in 2021 was $2,121.

Generation represents approximately one third of the cost of retail electricity, with the combined cost of transmission and distribution making up just under another third. The balance includes the retailing margin, levies and GST.

Most retail customers have term contracts with their electricity retailer, but some are on pre-pay arrangements. Customers may choose pre-pay to help them manage expenditure, but others may be forced onto pre-pay because they have been deemed to be a credit risk or have a history of disconnection because of unpaid bills. The costs of electricity on pre-pay are typically more than on term contract. The higher costs of pre-pay electricity can be a significant concern because research in New Zealand and in other countries indicates that households on pre-pay are more likely to be unable to afford to adequately heat their homes.

=== Customer switching ===
Electricity consumers connected to the grid have a choice of retail supplier. As at 31 July 2021, there were 40 electricity retailers registered with the Electricity Authority, although only 13 retailers had more than 10,000 customers. The top five retailers by number of individual consumer connections were Contact Energy, Genesis Energy, Mercury Energy, Trustpower, and Meridian Energy. These top five retailers are also generation companies. The Electricity Authority funds a price-comparison service managed by Consumer New Zealand, to assist residential consumers to compare pricing offered by different retailers, and evaluate the benefits of switching suppliers. The rate of customers switching suppliers has increased significantly over the past two decades, from 11,266 per month in January 2004 to 38,273 per month in May 2021.

=== Load control ===
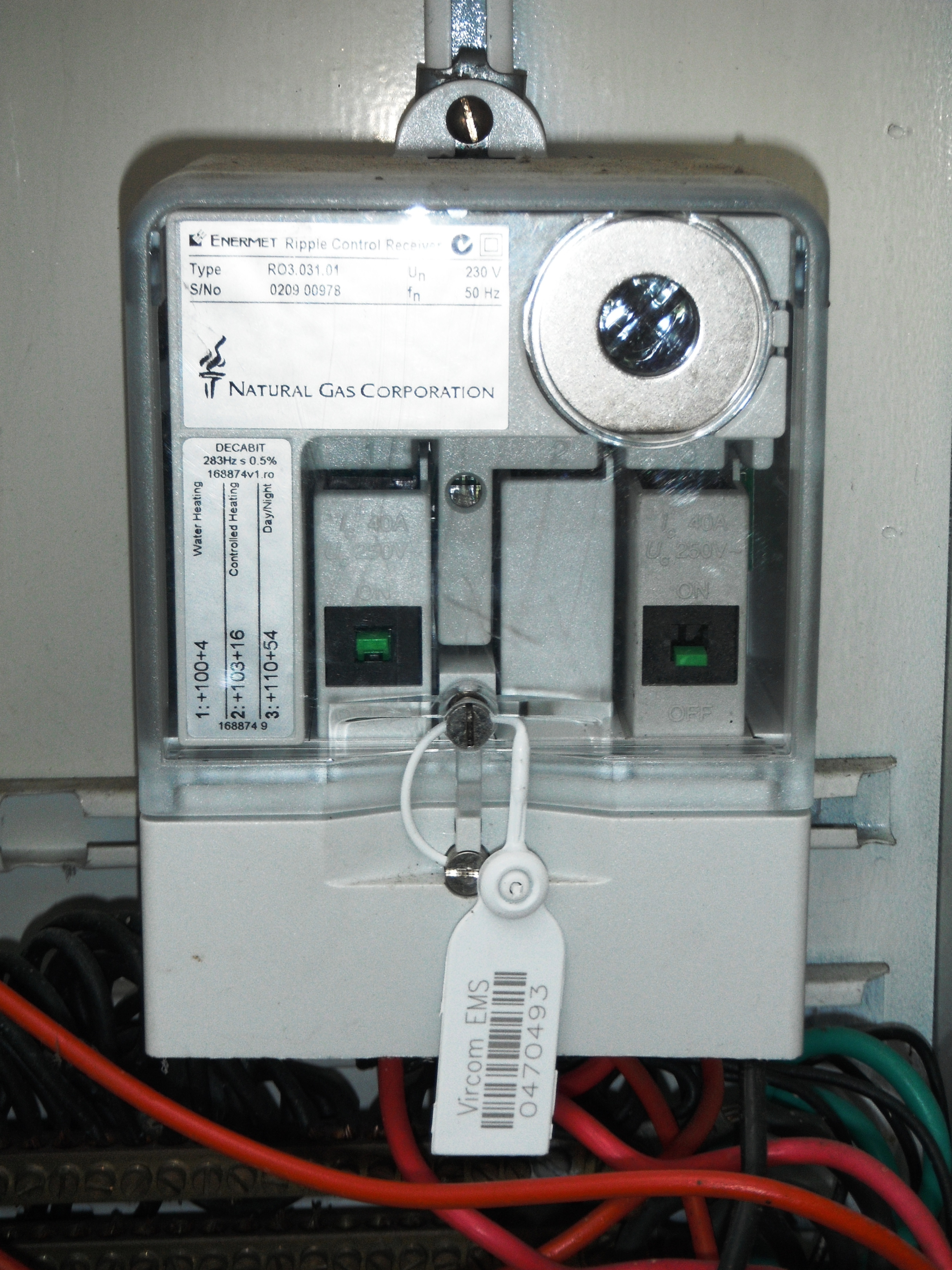
A ripple control relay in a New Zealand household

Load control, especially of domestic electric water heaters, has been and remains a major tool for electricity distribution businesses. Consumers are offered a lower rate, either overall or only for controlled load, in exchange for allowing the EDB to switch off the controlled load at peak times. Switching off and on the controlled load is normally achieved by ripple control, where an audio-frequency signal is sent by the EDB along the power lines to operate the relay at each consumers' premises. In 2018, it was estimated that up to 986 MW of load could be controlled.

=== Smart meters ===
Smart meters have been widely deployed in New Zealand to replace older generation domestic electricity meters. By 2016, over 1.5 million smart meters had been installed, representing 70% of homes. At the early stages of the installation of smart meters in 2009, the Parliamentary Commissioner for the Environment (PCE) criticised the roll-out on the grounds that the capabilities of the metering systems being deployed were too limited, and would not sufficiently enable future benefits for the consumers and the environment. In an update report in 2013, the PCE stated:

The New Zealand roll-out of electronic meters is unusual internationally, in that it has largely been left to the market. In other countries, regulatory bodies have been much more involved in specifying what these meters could do. In New Zealand, the retailers were left to decide on the features the meters contained. The opportunity for these meters to provide a wider range of benefits at little extra cost has been lost.

Most smart meters have been installed by electricity retailers. Retail services that have become available following the deployment of smart meters including time-of-use pricing. Some retailers offer a tariff that follows the spot price in the wholesale electricity market, and other offerings include a free "hour of power" and a web-based prepay service.

By 2022, the installation of nearly 2 million smart meters had successfully covered the majority of New Zealand's 2.26 million electricity consumers.

== Outages ==
As part of their information disclosure regulations, Transpower and all 29 EDBs are required to report the duration, frequency, and causes of power outages. The duration and frequency of outages are normally expressed in SAIDI (system average interruption duration index) and SAIFI (system average interruption frequency index). In the five years to 31 March 2024, the 29 EDBs reported an average unplanned-outage SAIDI of 204.04 minutes and a SAIFI of 1.87, and an average planned-outage SAIDI of 101.16 minutes and a SAIFI of 0.43. This is equivalent to the average consumer having an unplanned power outage lasting 1.75 hours every six to seven months, and a planned maintenance outage lasting just under four hours every 28 months.

Major power outages include:

- On the evening of 1 September 1928, a fire broke out at Horahora Power Station cutting supply to the entire Auckland, Waikato and Bay of Plenty regions. Electricity was restored to most areas within four hours using backup generators, but it took until the following morning to restore electricity to Rotorua and eastern Bay of Plenty.
- The 1998 Auckland power crisis was a major failure of electricity distribution to the Auckland central business district. Two 40-year-old cables connecting Penrose and Auckland's central business district failed in January to February 1998 during unseasonably hot weather, causing strain on the two newer remaining cables, which subsequently failed on 20 February 1998 and plunged central Auckland into darkness. The failure cost businesses NZ$300 million, and resulted in central Auckland being without electricity for 66 days until an emergency overhead line could reconnect the city – the longest peacetime blackout in history.
- In June 2006, the seven-hour 2006 Auckland Blackout occurred when a corroded shackle at Otahuhu broke in strong winds and subsequently blacked out much of inner Auckland.
- In October 2009, a three-hour blackout of northern Auckland and Northland occurred after a shipping container forklift accidentally hit the only major line supplying the region.
- On 12 November 2013, a commissioning test for the upgraded HVDC Inter-Island's control systems encountered a software bug, tripping the Benmore filter banks and causing the HVDC link, at the time transmitting 1000 MW northbound, to automatically roll back to 140 MW northbound in response. This in turn activated automatic underfrequency load shedding (AUFLS) systems in the North Island, cutting off over 300,000 customers to avoid a cascading failure. Power was restored to most areas within two hours.
- On Sunday 5 October 2014, a fire broke out at Transpower's Penrose substation. Major outages were experienced across central Auckland suburbs. The fire started in a cable joint in a medium voltage power cable. Over 75,000 businesses and households were affected. Power was fully restored by the afternoon of Tuesday 7 October.
- On 8 December 2016, the insulators on three towers of the Maungatapere to Kaikohe transmission line were shot out, cutting power to the entire Far North district for 12 hours. A 46-year-old man was subsequently arrested and charged with intentional damage and unlawfully possessing a firearm; he pleaded guilty and was sentenced to 23 months in prison.
- On the evening of 9 August 2021, a polar storm brought low temperatures across New Zealand and caused national electricity use to spike to 7,100 MW between 18:00 and 18:30. The Taranaki combined cycle gas turbine and Kawerau Power Station were out of service, and only two of the three coal-fired units at Huntly were operating. An intake blockage at Tokaanu hydroelectric power station and a drop in wind across the country reducing wind generation resulted in insufficient generation and system operator Transpower declaring a grid emergency. Transpower advised EDBs to reduce demand, but miscalculated the per-EDB demand limits causing WEL Networks and Unison Networks to implement widespread rolling blackouts to comply.

== Isolated areas ==
New Zealand's national electricity network covers the majority of both the North and South Islands. There are also a number of offshore islands which are connected to the national grid. Waiheke Island, New Zealand's most populous offshore island, is supplied by submarine cables from Maraetai. Arapaoa Island and d'Urville Island, both in the Marlborough Sounds, are supplied via overhead spans across Tory Channel and French Pass respectively.

However, many offshore islands and some parts of the South Island are not connected to the national grid and operate independent generation systems, mainly due to the difficulty of building lines from other areas. Diesel-fuelled generation using internal combustion engines is a common solution. Diesel fuel suitable for generators is readily available across the country at fuel stations – diesel is not taxed at the pump in New Zealand, and instead diesel-powered vehicles pay Road User Charges based on their gross tonnage and distance travelled.

Isolated areas with independent generation include:

- Great Barrier Island has the largest population in New Zealand without a reticulated electricity supply. Generation is from individual schemes for households or groups of households and is a combination of renewable and non-renewable energy.
- Haast. The area around Haast and extending south to Jackson Bay is not connected to the rest of New Zealand. It operates from a hydroelectric scheme on the Turnbull River with diesel backup.
- Milford Sound. Electricity is generated via a small hydroelectric scheme operating off Bowen Falls with a diesel backup.
- Deep Cove, Doubtful Sound. The small community at Deep Cove at the head of Doubtful Sound operates off a hydro scheme, although during the construction of the second Manapouri Tailrace Tunnel a high voltage cable was installed connecting this tiny settlement with the Manapouri Power Station.
- Stewart Island / Rakiura. This island's power supply for a population of 300/400 people is entirely diesel generated. Renewable energy sources are limited, but they are being actively investigated in order to increase the sustainability of the island's power supply, and reduce the cost.
- Chatham Islands. Power on Chatham Island is provided by two 200 kW wind turbines that provide most of the power on the island while diesel generators provide the rest, with fuel brought from the mainland.

Many other schemes exist on offshore islands that have permanent or temporary habitation, mostly generators or small renewable systems. An example is the ranger / research station on Little Barrier Island, where twenty 175 watt photovoltaic panels provide the mainstay for local needs, with a diesel generator for backup.

== See also ==
- List of power stations in New Zealand

== Sources ==
- Martin, John E, ed. (1998). People, Power and Power Stations: Electric Power Generation in New Zealand 1880–1998 (Second ed.). Wellington: Bridget Williams Books Ltd and Electricity Corporation of New Zealand. pp. 356 pages. ISBN 0-908912-98-6.
- Reilly, Helen (2008). Connecting the Country: New Zealand's National Grid 1886–2007. Wellington: Steele Roberts. ISBN 978-1-877448-40-9.
