= Electricity Corporation of New Zealand =

The Electricity Corporation of New Zealand Ltd (ECNZ), also known as Electricorp is a New Zealand state-owned enterprise (SOE) formed on 1 April 1987, as a transition entity in the process of deregulating the New Zealand electricity market. Most of ECNZ's remaining liabilities were resolved in the late 2000s, and ECNZ is now a residual entity with the sole remaining task of winding up a series of land title issues.

== Formation ==
In the 1980s the New Zealand Electricity Department (NZED), a government department, controlled and operated almost all New Zealand electricity generation and operated the electricity transmission grid. The first phase of deregulation saw the New Zealand Government corporatise the NZED and form the state-owned enterprise ECNZ.

== Division ==
In 1994, Transpower was separated from ECNZ and created as an SOE to own and operate the national grid. In 1996, ECNZ was split into two SOEs, ECNZ and Contact Energy, and on 1 April 1999 ECNZ was split into three electricity generation SOEs:

- Genesis Energy,
- Meridian Energy, and
- Mercury Energy (formerly Mighty River Power).

All three remain in existence, along with Contact Energy and Manawa Energy (formerly Trustpower, which was split into an electrical retailer business and a separate generation company (Manawa). The retail arm was sold to Mercury).

ECNZ was originally proposed to be wound up by 2009, but resolving the few remaining land title issues has taken years longer than originally expected.

== See also ==
- Electricity sector in New Zealand
