= Solar power in New Zealand =

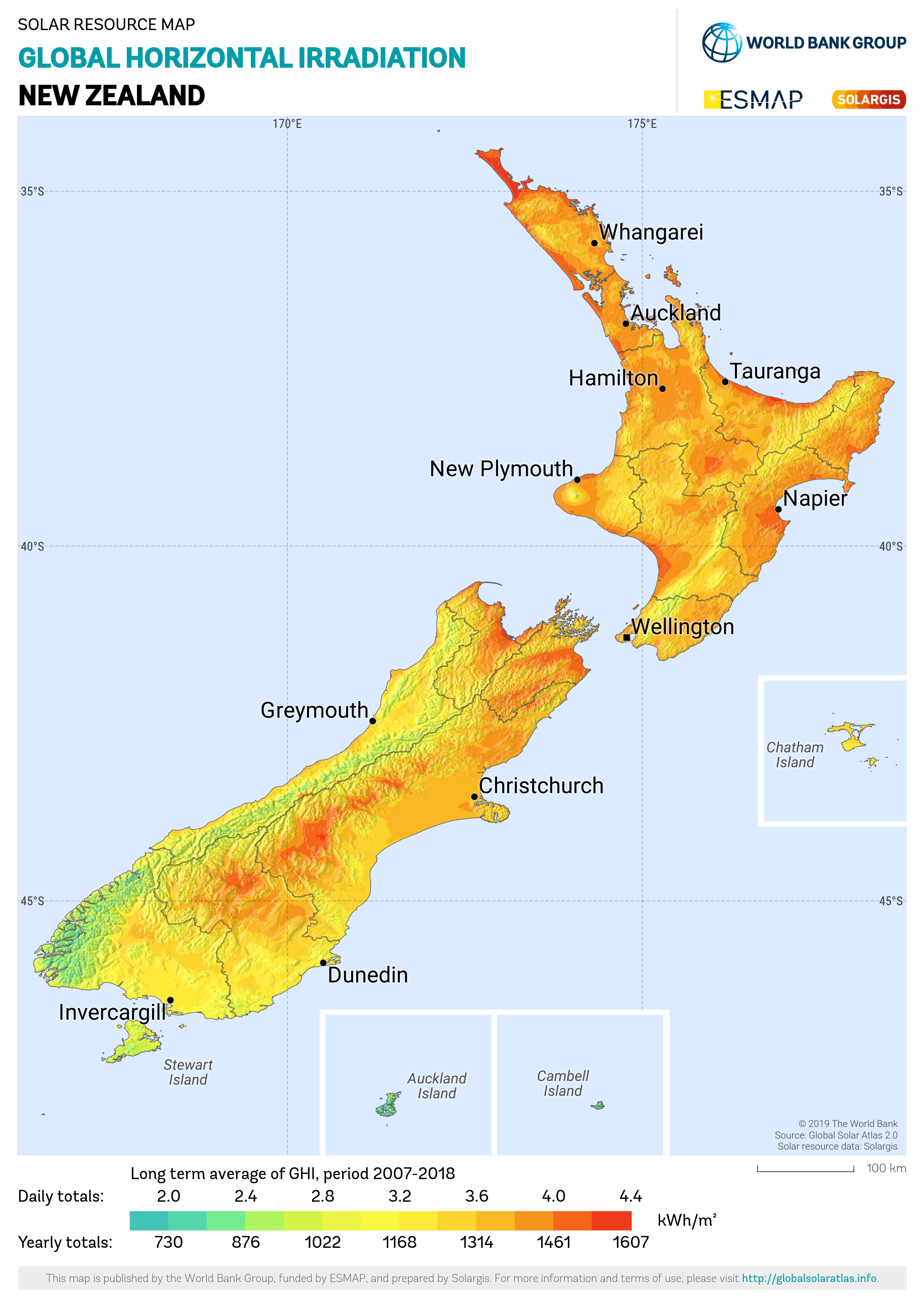
Solar potential of New Zealand

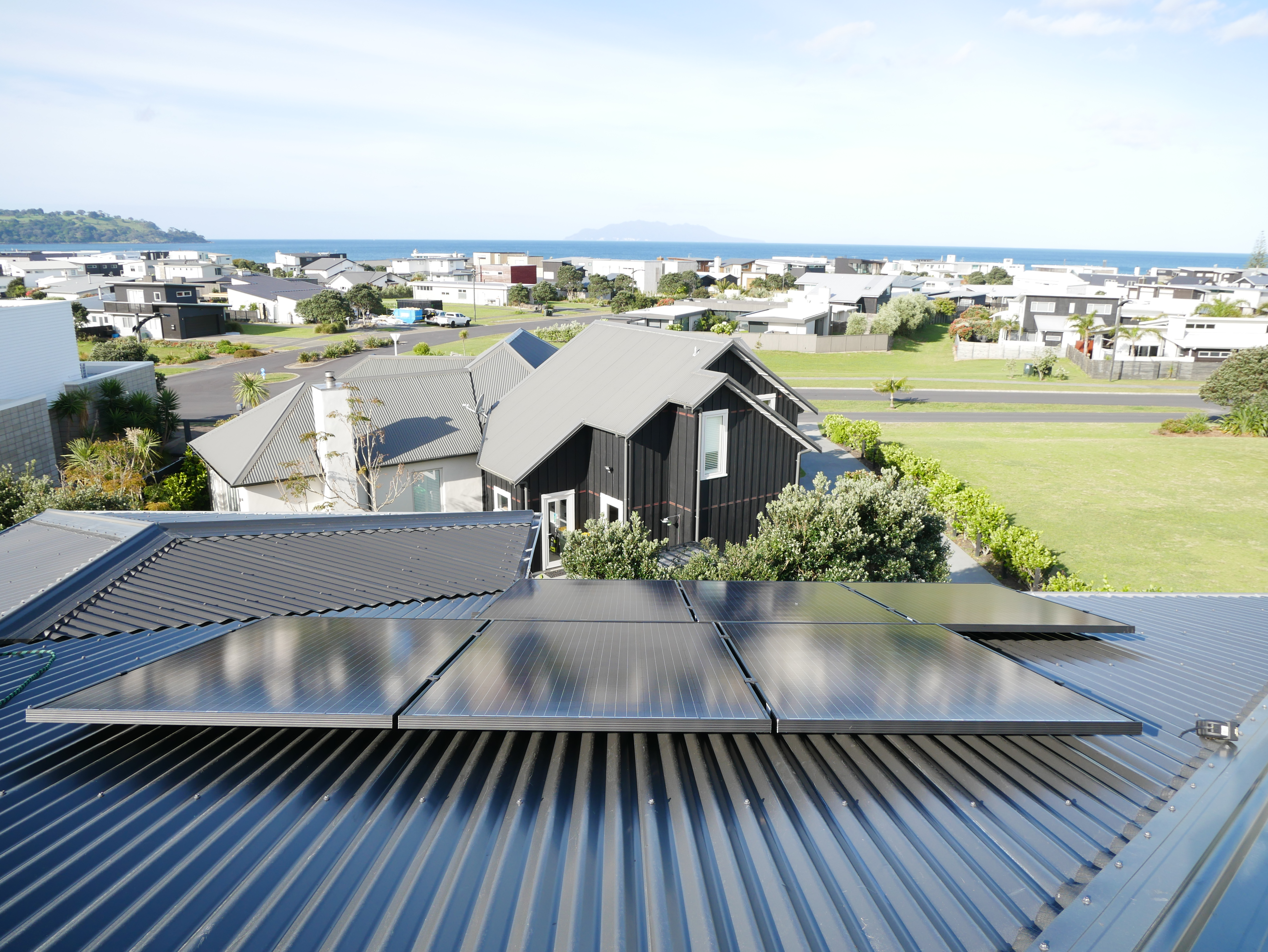
Solar panels on a home in Auckland

Solar power in New Zealand is a small but rapidly growing contributor to the country's electricity supply. In 2025, 971 gigawatt-hours of electricity was estimated to have been generated by grid-connected solar, 2.2% of all electricity generated in the country.

As of the end of June 2026, New Zealand had 1,000 MW of solar power installations, not including those directly connected to the transmission grid. Since records began in September 2013, solar capacity has been increasing exponentially, doubling in capacity roughly every 24 months. For new installations added in January 2026, the average residential system size was 7.9 kW and the average small and medium enterprise system was 20 kW.

== Installations by type ==
Solar power systems in New Zealand are classified by their maximum export power, connection type and obligations under the Electricity Industry Participation Code.

- Small-scale systems have a maximum export power of 10 kW or less.
- Medium-scale systems have a maximum export power between 10 kW and 300 kW.
- Large-scale systems have a maximum export power between 300 kW and 10 MW.
- Grid-scale systems have a maximum export power of 10 MW or more and must participate in the wholesale electricity market. Despite their name, they may be connected to a local electricity distribution network or directly to the national transmission grid.

The term "distributed generation" refers to any system connected to a local electricity distribution network rather than directly to the national transmission grid.

The terms "residential", "commercial" and "industrial" refer to the classification of the electricity connection rather than the size of the solar power system. Industrial systems are connected to installation control points (ICPs) with an ANZSIC code from divisions A to E, commercial systems to ICPs with codes from divisions F to S, and residential systems to ICPs without a valid ANZSIC code. "Small and medium enterprise" encompasses commercial and industrial ICPs with a service capacity of up to three-phase 500 amperes (approximately 345 kVA).

=== Distributed systems ===
Although there are no subsidies for small-scale solar in New Zealand, the declining costs of photovoltaic have driven strong growth in household installations in recent years. In 2009, the average turnkey price for a standard 3-kilowatt (kW) PV system was about NZ$40,000; by 2024 the average residential system size had increased to 7 kW while the average cost had fallen to NZ$16,500.

Rooftop and other small photovoltaic systems with a capacity of up to and including 10 kW are classified as small-scale distributed generation under Part 6 of the Electricity Industry Participation Code. These systems must be approved by the local electricity distribution business (EDB) before they are connected to the grid, but EDBs cannot unreasonably refuse connection if the equipment meets technical standards. Inverters are required to comply with AS/NZS 4777 and the respective EDB's connection and operating standards. Exports of up to 10 kW are allowed, except in identified areas of network congestion.

Such systems generally do not require building consent when installed on existing roofs. However, building consent or engineering approval may be needed for building-integrated PV (e.g. where the panels act as roof cladding) and for arrays larger than 40 square metres (430 sq ft) or in very high wind zones. Zoning rules may also limit installing solar panels, such as in heritage areas or where the panels exceed height-to-boundary restrictions.

The largest solar power system on a school in New Zealand was officially opened in a ceremony in February 2019 at Kaitaia College. Kelvin Davis, unveiled a plaque to acknowledge the installation of the 368 solar panel project which is spread across the rooftop of multiple buildings on the school campus.

By January 2014, solar photovoltaic systems had been installed in 50 schools through the Schoolgen program, a program developed by Genesis Energy to educate students about renewable energy, particularly solar energy. Each school has been given a 2 kW capacity PV system, with a total distributed installed capacity of 100 kilowatts-peak (kWp). Since February 2007, a total of 513 megawatt-hours (MWh) of electrical energy have been recorded.

In January 2020 Foodstuffs announced it would be installing a 1.1 MW PV array on its new Auckland distribution centre. In October 2020 Watercare Services installed a 1 MW floating array on its Auckland wastewater treatment plant.

=== Grid-scale plants ===
In July 2019 Refining NZ announced plans for a 26 MW solar farm at the Marsden Point Oil Refinery, but by May 2020 the project was on hold. In February 2020 Genesis Energy Limited announced plans for a 300 MW facility in the Waikato.' In September 2020 Hawke's Bay Airport announced plans for a 10 MW farm on unused airport land. In May 2020, the Ministry of Business, Innovation and Employment released a study that considered the economics of grid-scale solar and gave forecasts to 2060, showing that New Zealand has potential for gigawatts of grid-scale solar.

In February 2021 Far North Solar Farm applied for resource consent for a 16 MW farm at Pukenui on the Aupouri Peninsula in Northland. The development subsequently stalled due to a lack of network capacity.

In 2021, Kea Energy commissioned a solar power plant in the Wairau Valley in Marlborough with a potential capacity of 2.2 MW, with current plans to build capacity up to 1.85 MW as at March 2021. In June 2021, the Todd Corporation commissioned a 2.1 MW solar plant at Kapuni in south Taranaki. The facility includes 5800 solar panels and was claimed to be the largest grid-connected solar plant at the time.

In December 2021 Christchurch Airport announced it would be hosting a 150 MW plant at Kōwhai Park, to be scaled up over 30 years. On 30 December 2021 Island Green Power announced plans for a 200 MW solar farm in Waikato. In April 2022 Helios Energy announced plans for a series of farms with a combined output of 1 GW. In May 2022 Far North Solar Farm announced a partnership with offshore investment fund Aquila Capital to build 1 GW of generation.

In May 2021 Lodestone Energy announced plans for five solar farms in the upper North Island, capable of generating 400 GWh annually. The 32 MWp Kohirā solar farm, northwest of Kaitaia, began generating electricity in November 2023. As the first solar farm to exceed 10 MW, Kohirā was also the first required to participate in the wholesale electricity market.

As of September 2026, grid operator Transpower has 58 solar projects totalling 10,432 MW in its generation pipeline. Of those, fifteen projects totalling 2,382 MW are in the delivery stage (i.e. detailed design or construction).

==== Operating ====
Name	Location	Operator	DC capacity (MWp)	Nameplate capacity (MWac)	Commissioned	Coordinates
Ardmore	Ardmore, Auckland	KAL	13	9.75	2025	37°2′9.81″S 175°0′5.05″E
Clandeboye	Clandeboye, Canterbury	Lodestone Energy	27.7	25.2	2026	44°11′27″S 171°24′32″E
Dannevirke solar farm	Dannevirke, Manawātu	BrightFern Energy	23	19.1	2026	40.1951°S 176.038°E
Kohirā	Kaitaia, Northland	Lodestone Energy	33.3	23.7	2023	35°4′54″S 173°13′10″E
Kōwhai Park	Harewood, Canterbury	Christchurch Airport	168	150	2026	43°29′45″S 172°30′38″E
Lauriston	Lauriston, Canterbury	Genesis	63	47	2025	43°43′51.56″S 171°47′21.95″E
Omeheu	Edgecumbe, Bay of Plenty	Aquila Capital	38	27	2026	37°58′45.5″S 176°51′0.6″E
Pāmu Rā ki Whitianga	Whitianga, Waikato	Lodestone Energy	33	23.7	2025	36°51′2.01″S 175°39′47.33″E
Papareireiā	Maungaturoto, Northland	Tupu Tonu	21	17.6	2025	36°5′25″S 174°20′50″E
Pukenui	Pukenui, Northland	Aquila Capital	20.8	17.2	2025	34°49′06″S 173°6′38″E
Rangimārie	Maramarua, Waikato	NewPower Energy	12.3	10	2026	
Rangitaiki	Edgecumbe, Bay of Plenty	Lodestone Energy	32.4	23.7	2024	37°59′46.83″S 176°48′35.86″E
Rānui solar farm	Riverlands, Marlborough	Rānui Solar	12.6	9.9	2026	41.527°S 173.995°E
Taiohi	Rangiriri, Waikato	NewPower Energy	33	22.4	2025	37°27′14.6″S 175°7′17″E
Te Herenga o Te Rā	Waiotahe, Bay of Plenty	Lodestone Energy	42	33	2025	38°1′33.1″S 177°10′58.8″E
Te Ihi o te Ra	Gisborne Airport, Gisborne	Eastland Generation	5.2		2023	38°39′25.84″S 177°58′52.22″E
Te Matakupenga	New Plymouth, Taranaki	New Plymouth Airport	10	8.4	2025	39°0′50.9″S 174°10′28.1″E
Tauhei	Te Aroha, Waikato	Harmony Energy	202	150	2026	37°35′18.17″S 175°43′18.75″E
Te Puna Mauri ō Omaru	Ruawai, Northland	Northpower	20	19.3	2024	36°6′55.56″S 174°1′36.19″E
Thongcaster Rd	Oxford, Canterbury	MainPower	7.3		2026	43.39°S 172.13°E
Twin Rivers	Kaitaia, Northland	Rānui Generation	31	24	2025	
Willowby	Ashburton, Canterbury	RCR Green	7.2		2025	43.9435°S 171.7213°E
Ward	Ward, Marlborough	Energy Marlborough	9.3	8.9	2025	41.8224°S 174.1394°E

==== Under construction ====
Name	Location	Operator	Projected capacity (MW)	Coordinates
Central Hawke's Bay	Ongaonga, Hawke's Bay	Centralines / Lodestone Energy	31.5	39°55′51.97″S 176°29′3.48″E
Matangi	Cambridge, Waikato	NewPower	30	
Puna Komaru solar farm	Maungatapere, Northland	Northpower	18	35.765°S 174.206°E
Reefton solar farm	Reefton, West Coast	Lightyears	13.5	42°5′23″S 171°51′29″E
Ruakākā	Marsden Point, Northland	Meridian Energy	130	35°50′51.74″S 174°28′39.54″E
Somerton	Somerton, Canterbury	ANZA Power	42	
Tatuanui solar farm	Tatua, Waikato	Concord New Energy	11	37°37′52.62″S 175°35′4.29″E
Te Aho o te Ra	Kuratau, Taupō District	Lightyears	15	
Te Rāhui	Taupō, Waikato	Nova Energy	400	38°53′44.49″S 176°25′25.55″E
Tihori Solar Farm	Edgecumbe, Bay of Plenty	Genesis	127	37.961°S 176.86°E
Waimate Solar Farm	Waimate, Canterbury	Harbour Infrastructure / Energy Bay	9	

==== Proposed ====
Only solar plants over 5 MW generating capacity are listed, or if the generating capacity is unknown, plants covering an area of at least 10 hectares (25 acres).

Name	Location	Operator	Projected capacity (MW)	Status	Coordinates
Ashley	Ashley, Canterbury	Energy Bay		Proposed	43°16′4.37″S 172°36′59.54″E
Argyle Solar Farm	Wairau Valley, Marlborough	Manawa Energy	65	Proposed	41°40′11.15″S 173°12′7.25″E
Black Point	Oamaru, Canterbury	Ethical Power		Proposed	44°53′3.81″S 170°46′24.07″E
Bridge Street	Ongaonga, Hawke's Bay	Ranui Generation	55	Proposed	39°54′31.4″S 176°25′25″E
Buckleys Road	Brookside, Canterbury	KeaX	65	Consented	43°42′17″S 172°17′6″E
Bunnythorpe	Bunnythorpe, Manawatu	Lodestone Energy	26	Proposed	
Bunnythorpe 2	Bunnythorpe, Manawatu	Harmony Energy	400	Proposed	40°16′17.19″S 175°39′7.52″E
Bunnythorpe Energy Park	Bunnythorpe, Manawatu	Meridian	120	Consented	40°17′6.3″S 175°38′15.1″E
Carterton	Carterton, Wairarapa	Harmony Energy	133	Consented	
Dannevirke	Dannevirke, Tararua	NZ Clean Energy	107	Consented	40°11′1.9″S 176°0′22.8″E
Darfield	Darfield, Canterbury	NZ Clean Energy	117	Consented	43°27′24″S 172°5′28″E
Dunsandel	Dunsandel, Canterbury	Lodestone Energy		Consented	
Foxton	Foxton, Manawatu	Genesis	220	Consented	40°25′48″S 175°19′58″E
Foxton	Foxton, Manawatu	Aquila Clean Energy / Far North Solar Farm	40	Consented	
Glorit	Glorit, Auckland	Lightsource	179	Consented	36°27′12.1″S 174°25′15.04″E
Greytown	Greytown, Wairarapa	Helios	100	Proposed	41°5′55.8″S 175°26′21.45″E
Greytown 2	Greytown, Wairarapa	Far North Solar Farm	178	Consented	
Haldon	Mackenzie District	Lodestone Energy	220	Consented	
Hanmer Road	Canterbury	KeaX	80	Proposed	
Hawke's Bay Airport	Napier, Hawke's Bay	Hawke's Bay Airport	40	Proposed	39°28′8.18″S 176°51′50.12″E
Helensville	Helensville, Auckland	HES Aotearoa	70	Proposed	36°41′20″S 174°26′20″E
Highfield	Charing Cross, Canterbury	ANZA Power	120	Proposed	
Hinuera	Hinuera, Waikato	Harmony Energy	110	Proposed	
Huirangi	Waitara, Taranaki	Harmony Energy	100	Proposed	
Irishman Creek	Canterbury	Manawa	220	Proposed	
Kaipara	Kaipara District, Northland	Manawa Energy	100	Proposed	
Kairanga	Palmerston North, Manawatu	Lodestone Energy	27	Proposed	
Karioi	Tangiwai, Manawatū-Whanganui	ANZA Power	110	Consented	
Leeston	Leeston, Canterbury	Genesis	67	Proposed	
Lodestone One	Dargaville, Northland	Lodestone Energy	60	Proposed	
Makarewa	Makarewa, Southland	Network Electrical Servicing	8.4	Consented	
Māniatoto	Maniototo, Otago	Helios	300	Consented	45°4′9.34″S 170°6′34.64″E
Marton	Marton, Rangitikei District	Aquila Capital	41	Consented	
Marton 2	Marton, Rangitikei District	Energy Farm	110	Proposed	40°7′30.99″S 175°23′46.12″E
Marton 3	Marton, Rangitikei District	Harmony Energy	103	Consented	40°6′28.1″S 175°21′40.4″E
Massey University	Massey University, Palmerston North	Solar Bay	6	Proposed	40°23′30.75″S 175°37′50.42″E
Masterton Solar and Energy Storage	Waingawa near Masterton, Wairarapa	NZ Clean Energy	118	Consented	40°58′41.37″S 175°36′4.96″E
Moa Creek	Maniototo, Central Otago	Contact / Lightsource	300	Proposed	
Morrinsville	Morrinsville, Waikato	Meridian	110	Consented	
Mount Somers	Mount Somers, Canterbury	Lodestone Energy		Consented	
Naseby	Naseby, Otago	Solar Bay	50	Consented	
Norwood	Charing Cross, Canterbury	ANZA Power	120	Proposed	
Ongaonga	Ongaonga, Hawke's Bay	Sky Solar		Consented	39°55′15.55″S 176°26′46.64″E
Ongaonga 2	Ongaonga, Hawke's Bay	ANZA Power	100	Consented	39°55′37.57″S 176°25′10.58″E
Ōpunake	Ōpunake, Taranaki	Energy Farm	110	Consented	39°21′55.57″S 173°52′27.32″E
Rangitīkei	Rangitīkei district	FRV	210	Proposed	
Rotokawa	Rotokawa, Bay of Plenty	Tauhara North 2 Trust	105	Proposed	38°36′33″S 176°11′25″E
Skinner Road	Stratford, Taranaki	Ranui Generation	40	Proposed	
St Arnaud	St Arnaud, Tasman	Far North Solar Farm	123	Proposed	41.675°S 172.874°E
Stratford	Stratford, Taranaki	Contact / Lightsource	180	Consented	
Swannanoa	Swannanoa, Canterbury	Meridian Energy	200	Proposed	
Tahuna	Tahuna, Waikato	Kiwi Solar farms	23	Proposed	
The Point	Mackenzie District	Far North Solar Farm	420	Proposed	44°19′18.71″S 170°12′3.55″E
Three Stream	Kaponga, Taranaki	Ranui Generation	30	Consented	
Tikokino	Tikokino, Hawke’s Bay	Ranui Generation	55	Proposed	
Tolaga Bay	Tolaga Bay, East Coast	Eastland Generation	11.7	Proposed	
Twizel Solar Farm	Twizel, Mackenzie District	Bright Fern Energy	500	Proposed	44°17′57.3″S 170°2′55.6″E
Waiinu Energy Park	Waiinu Beach	Meridian	230	Proposed	39.843°S 174.739°E
Waipara	Waipara, Canterbury	Far North Solar Farm	135	Consented	43°2′52.03″S 172°43′58.09″E
Wairoa	Wairoa, East Coast	Eastland Generation	9	Proposed	39°0′17″S 177°24′38″E
Waiterimu	near Ohinewai, Waikato	Genesis	271	Consented	37°28′35.57″S 175°16′14.7″E
Wellsford	Wellsford, Auckland	Energy Farm	76	Proposed	36°18′56.07″S 174°30′55.5″E
Western Bays	Kuratau, Waikato	Meridian	420	Proposed	

== Cost-effectiveness ==
Retail buy-back rates for solar power exported to the grid range from 8 to 17 cents per kilowatt-hour, plus 15% GST if the system owner is GST-registered. The financial return for PV systems depends largely on maximising on-site consumption, as self-consumed electricity offsets retail power prices of around 23 to 38 cents per kilowatt-hour. Common methods to increase self-consumption include running appliances during daylight hours, using energy management systems, or installing battery storage.

The effective cost of electricity from rooftop PV is estimated at around 11 cents per kilowatt-hour. Reported payback periods for households range from five to seven years, with shorter times for users with high daytime demand. Financing costs can significantly extend the payback period, though some banks offer low-interest "green loans" for solar installations.

== Statistics ==
Source: NREL

Solar installations – numbers, sizes and proportion of total installed capacity from 2013
End of year	ICP count	ICP uptake rate (%)	Total capacity installed (MW)	Avg. capacity installed (kW)	Net generation (GWh)	Capacity factor (annual average MW)
2013	2,295	0.11385	8.620	3.756	7	n/a
2014	5,530	0.27141	22.085	3.994	19	14.2%
2015	9,534	0.46274	37.450	3.928	36	13.8%
2016	13,794	0.66199	53.282	3.863	56	14.0%
2017	18,298	0.86715	71.029	3.882	76	14.0%
2018	22,740	1.06422	92.029	4.047	100	14.0%
2019	26,620	1.22897	116.015	4.358	127	13.9%
2020	30,891	1.40551	147.068	4.761	160	13.9%
2021	37,170	1.66600	194.045	5.220	208	13.9%
2022	46,384	2.04713	264.675	5.706	283	14.0%
2023	56,792	2.46885	378.683	6.668	371	13.9%
2024	68,978	2.96140	564.985	8.191	595	15.2%
2025	81,052	3.44407	848.971	10.474	971	15.9%

Cumulative installed solar capacity in New Zealand since 2013. View chart definition.

=== Installations by region ===
Solar installations by region as of 30 June 2026
Network reporting region	Residential ICPs			Small and medium business ICPs		
Network reporting region	Installations	Uptake (%)	Capacity (MW)	Installations	Uptake (%)	Capacity (MW)
Bay of Islands (Top Energy)	2,355	8.04	12.49	224	5.03	3.04
Whangarei and Kaipara (Northpower)	3,220	6.04	17.82	227	2.58	4.25
Waitemata (Vector)	6,852	2.84	37.25	217	0.95	4.87
Auckland (Vector)	6,685	1.97	34.05	476	1.14	13.26
Counties (Counties Power)	2,120	4.89	11.11	129	2.08	2.80
Thames Valley (Powerco)	2,401	3.77	13.61	364	3.27	10.13
Waikato (WEL Networks)	3,466	3.95	21.28	258	2.10	6.67
Waipa (Waipā Networks)	1,524	6.15	9.85	124	2.51	2.82
King Country (The Lines Company)	339	1.85	1.95	100	2.08	2.40
Tauranga (Powerco)	4,998	6.01	30.15	186	1.91	4.00
Rotorua (Unison Networks)	1,034	3.62	5.82	61	1.48	1.39
Eastern Bay of Plenty (Horizon Energy)	906	4.51	4.81	90	2.69	1.54
Taupo (Unison Networks)	595	3.74	3.39	31	1.24	0.52
Tairawhiti and Wairoa (Firstlight Network)	692	3.22	3.19	68	1.74	0.97
Hawke's Bay (Unison Networks)	3,747	6.54	21.21	249	3.22	5.20
Central Hawke's Bay (Centralines)	464	6.90	2.97	58	2.90	1.07
Southern Hawke's Bay (Scanpower)	91	1.81	0.45	19	1.18	0.39
Wairarapa (Powerco)	1,597	6.90	9.92	99	2.58	2.25
Taranaki (Powerco)	2,357	4.71	15.04	195	1.94	4.06
Whanganui (Powerco)	1,041	3.78	6.12	73	1.56	1.45
Manawatu (Powerco)	1,956	3.85	11.85	134	1.75	3.40
Kapiti and Horowhenua (Electra)	2,284	5.35	12.82	83	1.97	1.51
Wellington (Wellington Electricity)	4,220	2.57	22.25	86	0.54	1.86
Nelson and Tasman (Network Tasman)	3,782	8.36	22.69	231	3.41	4.54
Marlborough (Marlborough Lines)	1,566	7.00	8.47	83	2.38	0.92
Buller (Buller Electricity)	65	1.52	0.38	8	1.47	0.18
West Coast (Westpower)	232	2.00	1.58	18	0.74	0.24
North Canterbury (MainPower)	3,038	8.08	16.99	151	2.14	2.80
Central Canterbury (Orion)	9,116	4.49	53.01	492	1.92	11.62
Ashburton (EA Networks)	704	5.04	4.34	175	2.46	7.01
South Canterbury (Alpine Energy)	1,108	4.03	5.87	102	1.67	2.05
Waitaki (Network Waitaki)	359	3.46	2.06	49	1.77	2.18
Queenstown (Aurora Energy)	862	7.04	5.36	50	1.59	0.84
Central Otago (Aurora Energy)	2,512	11.92	14.69	167	3.89	3.57
Otago (OtagoNet)	441	3.73	2.32	50	1.54	1.17
Dunedin (Aurora Energy)	1,014	2.00	5.10	36	0.67	0.48
Southland (The Power Company)	739	2.67	4.33	77	0.80	1.28
Invercargill (Electricity Invercargill)	182	1.16	0.85	21	1.06	0.40
New Zealand	80,922	4.01	459.04	5,274	1.82	119.24

== See also ==
- Solar power
- Photovoltaic power station
- Energy in New Zealand
- Electricity sector in New Zealand
- Renewable energy in New Zealand
- Wind power in New Zealand
- Ocean power in New Zealand
- Geothermal power in New Zealand
- Biofuel in New Zealand
- Hydroelectric power in New Zealand
- Solar hot water in New Zealand
- Renewable energy commercialisation
- Renewable energy by country
