= Hydroelectric power in New Zealand =

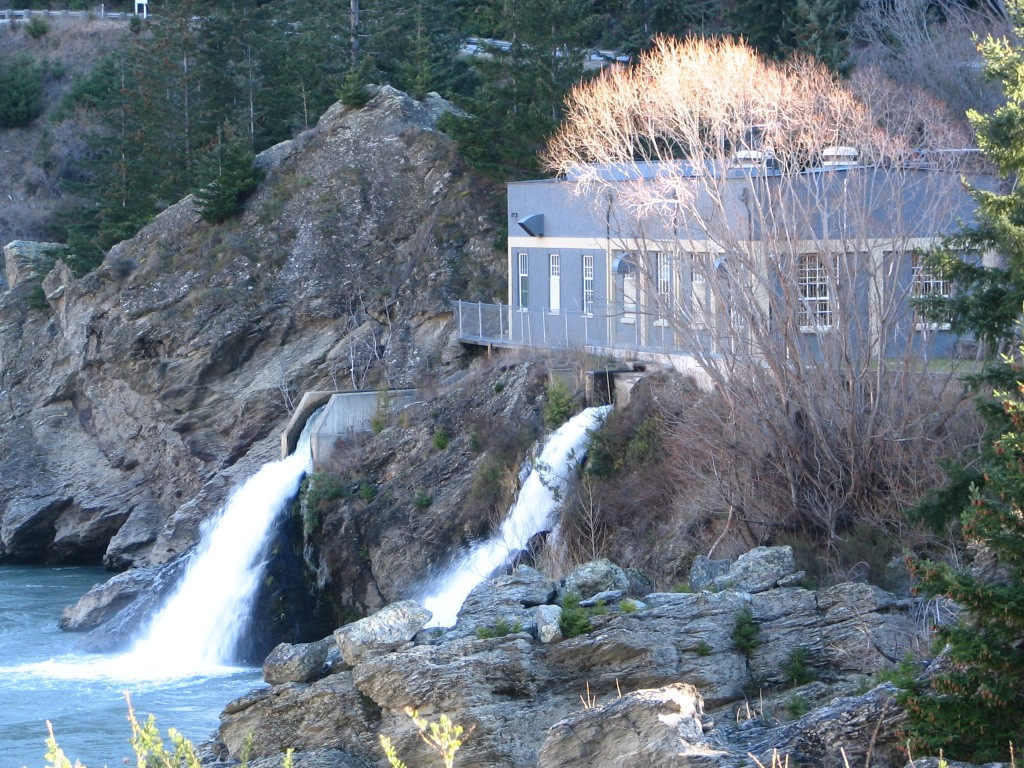
Lower Roaring Meg power station, part of a small scale scheme commissioned in 1936.

Hydroelectric power in New Zealand has been a part of the country's energy system for over 100 years and continues to provide more than half of the country's electricity needs. Hydroelectricity is the primary source of renewable energy in New Zealand. Power is generated the most in the South Island and is used most in the North Island.

Early schemes such as the Waipori scheme commissioned in 1903 and the Lake Coleridge power station commissioned in 1914 established New Zealand's use of renewable hydro energy. By the early 1950s, over 1,000 megawatts (1,300,000 hp) of installed capacity was from hydro energy. By the early 1960s, most North Island hydro sites had been developed while the South Island still had many potential sites. The commissioning of the HVDC Inter-Island link in 1965 made it possible to send large amounts of electricity between the two islands, and from that time hydro capacity in the South Island increased rapidly. Major developments included the 540 MW Benmore Power Station (1966), the 700 MW Manapouri power station (1971), the 848 MW Upper Waitaki River Scheme (1977–85) and the 432 MW Clyde Dam (1992). By the mid-1990s, hydro capacity had reached over 5,000 MW, and remains around this level today.

In New Zealand, hydropower accounts for 55% of electricity production, ranking it as the fifth-largest contributor among International Energy Agency (IEA) member nations.

== History ==
The first industrial hydro-electric power plant was established at Bullendale in Otago in 1885, to provide power for a 20 stamp battery at the Phoenix mine. The plant used water from the nearby Skippers Creek, a tributary of the Shotover River.

Reefton was the first town with a reticulated public electricity supply from a significant hydroelectric plant after the commissioning of the Reefton Power Station in 1888. It was followed by Wellington in June 1889.

The first hydro-electric power station constructed by the government was the Okere Falls Power Station near Rotorua. The plant began operating in May 1901. Electricity was transmitted at 3300 volts over a 13-mile (21 km) route to Rotorua, and was used to drive sewage pumps, and some public buildings including five thermal baths. During the next twenty years private companies and local authorities established a number of stations, including Waipori in Otago and Horahora on the Waikato River. The first large scheme developed by the government was Coleridge in Canterbury, opened in 1914. Other significant early stations include Mangahao (1924), Arapuni (1929) and Tuai (1929), connected to a single North Island grid in 1934, and Waitaki (1935) in the South Island.

The Waikaremoana cascade was completed in the 1940s with Piripaua and Kaitawa stations. A further seven stations were developed as a cascade on the Waikato River from 1953 and 1970. In the 1950s development of the Clutha River with Roxburgh Dam and the upper Waitaki in the MacKenzie Basin with "Tekapo A" was begun. With commissioning of the HVDC Inter-Island link in 1965, the Waitaki scheme was further expanded with Benmore Power Station (1965), Aviemore Dam (1968), and later Tekapo B, and Ōhau A, B and C. In the North Island, the Tongariro Power Scheme was completed between 1964 and 1983.

The plan in 1959 to raise the level of Lake Manapouri for hydro-electric development was met with resistance, and the Save Manapouri Campaign became a milestone in environmental awareness. Later hydro schemes, such as the last large hydro to be commissioned, Clyde Dam in 1992, were also controversial.

The country experienced a boom in large-scale hydropower development from 1950 to 1980, but such development has significantly declined afterward. Notably, there have been no new large-scale hydropower projects since the commissioning of the Clyde Power Station in 1992.

== Generation ==
Based on data from 2007, hydroelectric power accounts for 11% of the total primary energy usage in New Zealand with imported oil and oil products making up 70% of the primary energy. Hydroelectric power accounts for 57% of the total electricity generation in New Zealand.

Over the decade starting from 1997 hydroelectric power as a percentage of total net electricity generated went from 66% down to 55%. An increase in coal and gas for electricity generation accounted for the reduction in hydroelectric power as a percentage of the total.

Large hydroelectric power schemes have been built in the Central Plateau region of the North Island and in the MacKenzie Basin in the South Island, as well as a series of power stations on the Waikato River.

In 2014, hydro generation produced 24,094 gigawatt-hours (86,740 TJ) of electricity, representing 57% of the total electricity generated. The percentage of New Zealand's electricity provided by hydro generation has been between 50% and 60% for the last decade, compared with a high of 84% in 1980. In 2015, the distribution of renewable energy in the total power usage of New Zealand was 80.2%. It ranks second to Norway in countries with official plans to increase renewable power usage to 90% by 2025. This is due to the hydroelectricity expansion and from investments in geothermal generation.

In general, New Zealand has focused its hydropower production in the South Island and transports energy to the North Island across high voltage wires in a transmission grid. There is a higher demand for energy in the North Island due to several major cities located there. From 2008 to 2018, hydropower has generated almost 60% of total electricity production in New Zealand, with 82% generation from renewable resources. Currently, New Zealand has over 100 hydroelectric power plants in use.

From the early 1900s to 2010, there has been a plateau in energy growth for hydroelectric power systems. There is room to expand on the current hydropower scales in New Zealand, however the industry will not change as drastically as it has in the 20th century. Small unit growth and large run-of-river plants are the most prominent examples for future hydroelectric developments. Many other renewable energy resources are competitors to hydroelectric because they are less expensive.

There are several barriers that prevent the development of hydroelectricity in New Zealand, including cost, geography, and systematic factors. For example, New Zealand hydroelectric systems are low in storage volume. This means that maximum storage of energy is 34 days during the peak of winter. If there is an unusual amount of precipitation one year, then there would be a shortfall in energy from the hydro system. In addition, the cost benefit of using hydroelectric power over wind or geothermal energy in New Zealand is highly debated.

== Proposed projects ==
There are a number of proposed hydroelectric power projects in New Zealand and, despite the demand for more renewable energy, there is opposition to some new hydroelectric projects.

- Project Aqua was a large scheme proposed by Meridian Energy on the Waitaki River but was dropped after significant opposition. The North Bank tunnel concept is a new proposal being developed by Meridian Energy for a hydroelectric power scheme on the river.
- The Wairau Hydro Scheme is a canal and power station scheme, for which TrustPower was granted resource consents in August 2008. This project is opposed by Green Party.
- TrustPower proposes to develop a 46MW extension to the Arnold Power Station on the West Coast. Resource consents were granted in November 2008.

Other proposals, at various planning stages, include schemes on the Mātakitaki, Matiri, Waimakariri, Clutha, Kaituna and the Gowan Rivers.

In 2011, the New Zealand Energy Strategy (NZES) and New Zealand Energy Efficiency and Conservation Strategy (NZEECS) were developed by the government to establish the main priorities of future hydroelectric power development. In 2016, the electric vehicle program was implemented. This program aims to double the number of electric vehicles used each year, with a target of 64,000 electric cars by 2021.

== NZ battery project ==
The International Energy Agency's (IEA) 2023 Energy Policy Review of New Zealand details the commencement of the NZ Battery Project by the New Zealand government in 2020, targeting the enhancement of energy reliability amid reduced hydroelectric power generation during low-rainfall periods, or "dry years". This initiative aims to address the challenges posed by New Zealand's substantial dependence on hydropower, which, while supplying over 80% of the country's electricity, faces operational issues during dry spells due to limited storage capacity. The project aligns with New Zealand's goal of achieving a 100% renewable electricity supply and advancing its decarbonization efforts. In this context, it assesses several energy storage options, including the Lake Onslow pumped hydro project.

== Environmental issues ==
There has been opposition to hydroelectric power on environmental grounds for many decades.

The first nationwide environmental campaign in New Zealand was opposition to raising Lake Manapouri for a power station to supply electricity to the Tiwai Point Aluminium Smelter. The Save Manapouri Campaign was a success and the power station was built without raising the level of the lake outside of its natural range.

The highly endangered black stilt, which nests on the braided rivers beds of the South Island, is threatened by changes in river flows as a result of new hydro dams and changes in flow regimes for existing dams. The Upper Waitaki Power Development posed a threat to the black stilt habitat and a programme was set up to lessen the threats. Because of opposition to new HEP stations New Zealand's demand for increased power has been met from coal and gas fired power stations. Engineers have fine tuned some HEP stations such as at Tokaanu to increase output by 20% with the same water use.

== See also ==
- Biofuel in New Zealand
- Electricity sector in New Zealand
- Energy in New Zealand
- Geothermal power in New Zealand
- List of power stations in New Zealand
- List of renewable energy topics by country and territory
- Ocean power in New Zealand
- Renewable energy commercialization
- Renewable energy in New Zealand
- Solar hot water in New Zealand
- Solar power in New Zealand
- Wind power in New Zealand
