= Biofuel in New Zealand =

Biofuels remain a small share of national energy use in New Zealand but are viewed as a tool for reducing emissions, improving fuel security, and supporting regional industries.

Commercial activity has focused on low‑level bioethanol and biodiesel blends, influenced by feedstock supply, policy settings, and global fuel prices. Government programmes and proposed sustainability obligations have aimed to encourage investment and provide certainty for producers.

New Zealand’s potential is closely tied to its forestry sector and emerging waste‑to‑fuel technologies, with national studies identifying opportunities for scale alongside challenges such as capital costs, infrastructure needs, and competition for biomass resources.

== Biofuels ==
=== Biodiesel ===
In 2007, Ecodiesel planned to build a biodiesel plant in Onehunga, but the project was not completed.

In 2010, Gull began selling a 5%-blend of biodisel under the brand name Diesel Max. The biodiesel was originally sourced locally from Environ Fuels, and available at 5 of out Gull's 100 petrol stations. Initially, there was some concern about engine compatibility for older vehicles.

In 2014, Gull switched from using locally produced biofuels to an imported blend from Australia, citing "local supply issues".

In 2016, Z Energy opened a biodiesel manufacturing plant in Wiri, called Te Kora Hou.

In 2020, Gull discontinued their biodiesel brand, citing issues with cost, scalability, and import supply chains. That same year, Z Energy announced that they were shutting down their biodiesel factory as it was uneconomical.

In 2022, Z Energy abandoned their biodiesel factory.

=== Bioethanol ===
Gull Force 10, a bioethanol blend, was introduced commercially in New Zealand for the first time by the company Gull on 1 August 2007. It contained 10% ethanol made from dairy by product by Anchor Ethanol, a subsidiary of Fonterra Ltd. On 8 August 2008, Gull introduced a 91-octane bioethanol blend in Albany. The blend, 'regular plus', contained 10% ethanol and included bioethanol made from whey. Gull planned to release the fuel to 33 stations, and marketed it as under $2 per litre. On release, the company said it would try to keep the price two cents less than its standard 91-octane fuel.

It was reported that British fuel producer Argent Energy would abandon plans to build a plant in Tauranga to produce tallow-based biodiesel. The plant would have cost over $100 million to build, and would have competed with cheaper sugar-based ethanol imports from Brazil. The plant could not proceed because a 42c/L tax break on bioethanol until 2010 had not been approved by the government.

=== Biomass ===
Firewood is used as a means of heating some homes in New Zealand and wood pellet fires are now becoming more common, especially in areas with high levels of air pollution.

== Legislation and government funding ==
=== Biofuel Bill ===
The Labour-led government introduced a Biofuel Bill in October 2007. It passed its second reading in Parliament in September 2008. The Bill requires petrol and diesel to have a percentage of biofuels added with the amount increasing to 2.5% after five years.

In April 2008 the Parliamentary Commissioner for the Environment, independent from but funded by the government, recommended in a select committee briefing that the Biofuels Bill should not proceed. This conclusion was arrived at on a number of grounds. The Biofuels Bill did not restrict the importation of biofuels and this would lead to potential societal and environmental harm that may be greater than if biofuels were not used. It was also claimed that this may damage the "clean green" image of New Zealand. Waiting for second generation biofuels and curbing the growth in transport energy consumption were also seen as reasons for not supporting the Bill

After the National Party gained power it repealed parts of the Biofuel Bill with the Energy (Fuels, Levies, and References) Biofuel Obligation Repeal Act. It removed the mandatory requirement for all fuel to have a percentage of biofuel.

=== Sustainable Biofuels Bill ===
The Green Party tabled a Sustainable Biofuels Bill which passed its first reading in Parliament in July 2009. The Bill "is to ensure that biofuels that are supplied or sold in New Zealand from 1 May 2010 are sustainable biofuels".

=== Funding ===
In the 2009 Budget $36 million was made available over a three-year period as grants for biofuel production. It was only available for producers who sell on the local market and are able to meet the quality specifications for engine fuels.

== See also ==
- Biofuels by region
- Solar power in New Zealand
- Wind power in New Zealand
- Ocean power in New Zealand
- Geothermal power in New Zealand
- Hydroelectric power in New Zealand
- Solar hot water in New Zealand
- Renewable energy in New Zealand
- Renewable energy by country
