= Gull Force 10 =

Gull Force 10 is a brand of E10, 98 octane fuel marketed by Gull Petroleum in New Zealand, consisting of 10% bioethanol and 90% gasoline. The fuel was the first biofuel product to go on sale in the country, and was launched by Prime Minister Helen Clark on August 1, 2007.

The bioethanol is produced by Fonterra from the fermentation of whey, a by-product of New Zealand's large dairy industry. Trials of the fuel have been taking place in New Zealand since 2004, although other countries have been using similar fuels for many years. Under the government's Biofuels Sales Obligation, announced on February 13, 2007, oil companies must sell 3.4% biofuels (by energy content) by 2012. This requirement was rescinded by the National-led government.

== See also ==
- Biofuels in New Zealand
- Renewable energy
- Peak oil
- Low-carbon economy
