= Far North Solar Farm =

New Zealand electricity generator company

- Type: Private
- Industry: Electricity generation
- Founded: 2019
- Headquarters: New Zealand
- Key people: Richard Homewood; John Telfer
- Website: fnsf.co.nz

Far North Solar Farm is an Australian-owned electricity generation company. It was placed into receivership on 19 November 2026. As of December 2025, it operates one solar farm, with one more under construction. At the time it was placed in receivership, it was facing a resource consent appeal to the Environment Court in relation to its proposal to build an industrial-scale solar plant in Waipara, North Canterbury, a region known as a wine-growing and tourism destination.

The company has been described as having an "unusual business history", with its directors previously involved in a solar power company implied by the NZ Sustainable Energy Association to be "disreputable". That company was issued with a formal warning by the NZ Commerce Commission for making misleading claims, and was the subject of coverage by NZ consumer affairs programme Fair Go under the headline "Solar power company accused of robbing the community blind".

== History ==
In May 2021 the company's announced its first project, the Pukenui. In May 2022 it announced a partnership with Aquila Capital to develop 1 GW of solar generation in New Zealand.

In November 2023 the company announced it would apply for resource consent for a 420MW solar farm in the environmentally sensitive Mackenzie District. The project was subsequently scheduled in the controversial Fast-track Approvals Act 2024, creating a faster pathway to obtaining resource consent. The project is controversial, with "potentially catastrophic" effects on endangered birdlife.

The Pukenui solar farm was finally completed in October 2025.

The partnership with Aquila Capital ended in December 2025, with Aquila acquiring all interests in the solar farms developed as part of the partnership, including Pukenui.

The company's proposal for a 180-hectare solar farm in Waipara has attracted widespread local opposition and in several areas involves contested legal points. Local sources have indicated the proposal may be subject to appeal through the higher courts in New Zealand.

== Power stations ==
=== Proposed / under construction ===
Name	Type	Location	Projected capacity (MW)	Status
Greytown 2	Solar	Greytown, Wairarapa	175	Consented
The Point	Solar	Mackenzie District	420	Proposed
Waipara	Solar	Waipara, Canterbury	135	Proposed
