= NPD (petrol) =

New Zealand fuel distributor

- Logo of NPD

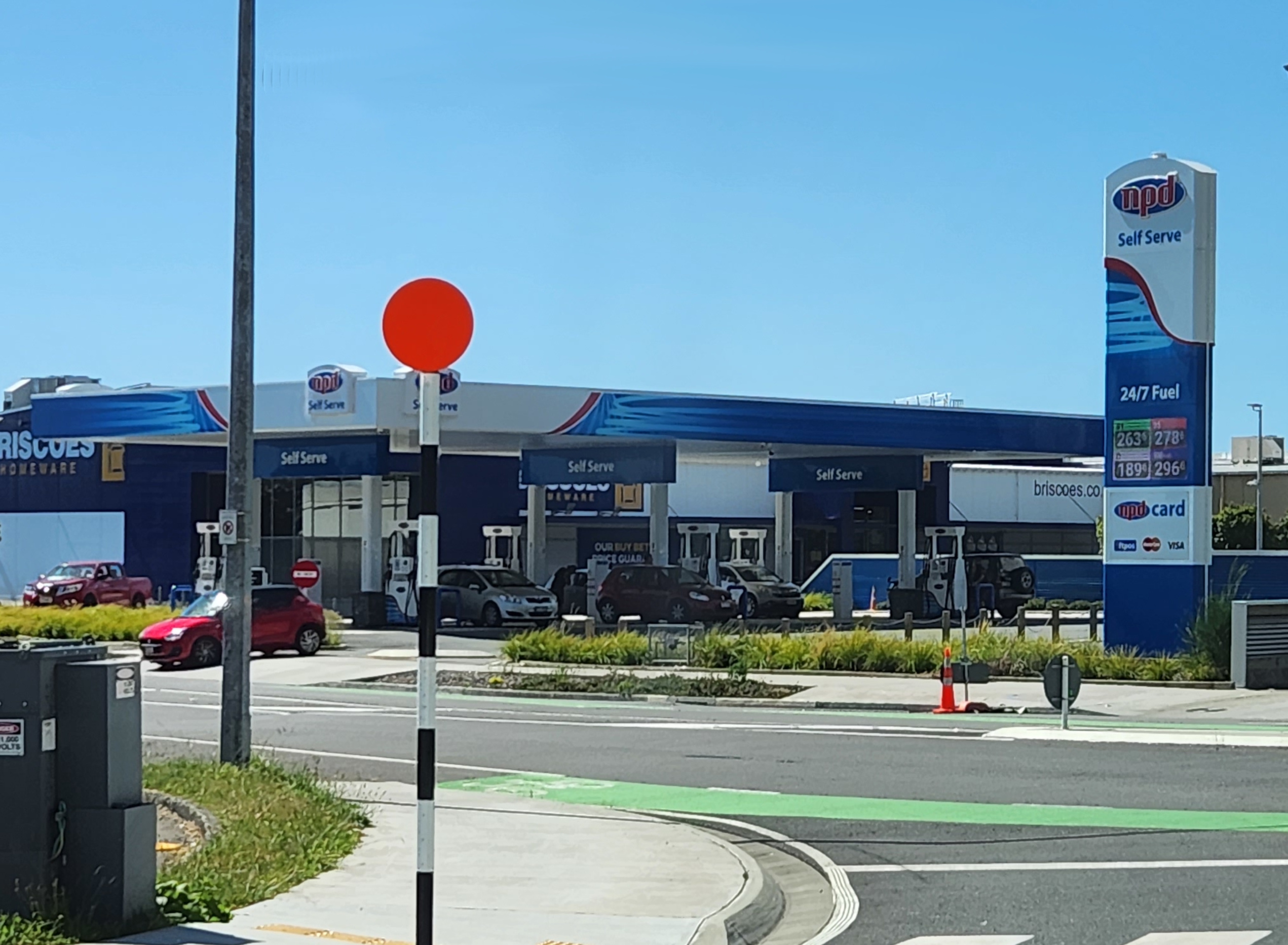
- Formerly: Nelson Petroleum Distributors
- Company type: Private
- Industry: Petroleum
- Number of locations: 96 (2021)
- Area served: New Zealand
- Website: www.npd.co.nz

NPD, short for Nelson Petroleum Distributors, is a New Zealand family-owned budget fuel distributor. It distributes Mobil fuels and Castrol lubricants, and started business in the 1960s. It is based in Nelson. As of August 2021, NPD has 96 petrol stations, most being in the South Island. According to a study from the Commerce Commission, NPD "appeared to have the most impact on the oil majors' prices". As of May 2020 it has 150 staff.

According to Gaspy, NPD and Waitomo had the lowest fuel prices in New Zealand in 2019.

== History ==
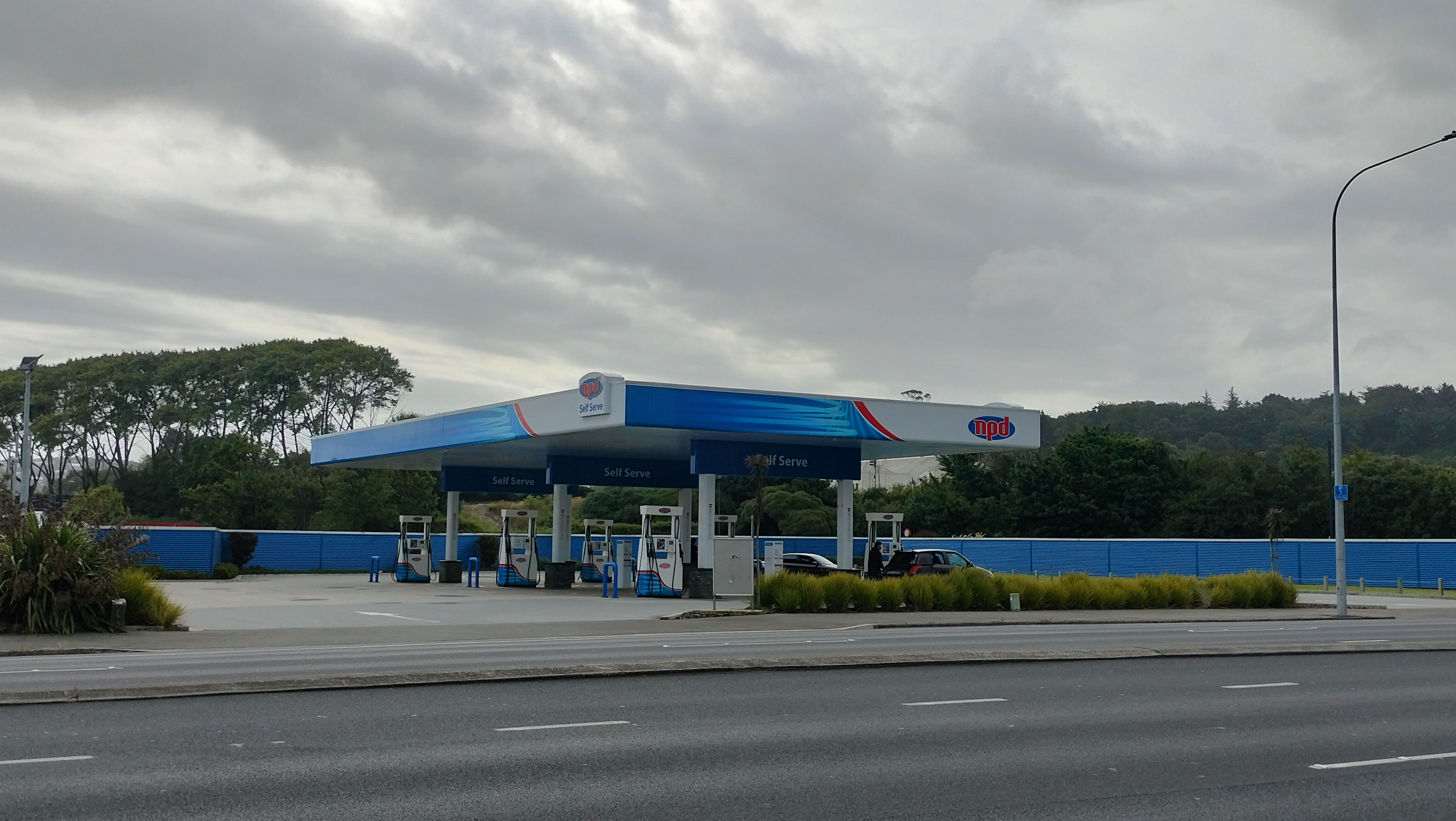
The NPD petrol station in Andersons Bay, Dunedin.

NPD was started in the 1961 by the Milne family. It was a contractor carrier for Mobil fuels and Castrol lubricants. NPD became a wholesale distributor for Mobil in 1996, at the time it had 11 locations and two trucks. NPD was previously known as Nelson Petroleum Distributors. Between 2013 and 2016, NPD increased its site count from 30 to 40.

NPD planned to open 18 new locations in 2020, but due to the COVID-19 pandemic, they were only able to open 10. In 2019, 13 new sites were created, bringing the total number to 67 locations.

In June 2021 NPD opened in the North Island for the first time. It started with four locations, in Te Rapa in Hamilton, Westown in New Plymouth, Wiri in Auckland, and Palmerston North. At the time they had a 'first stage' goal of opening 32 sites in the North Island. In 2022 Rush Munro's, an ice creamery operating in the same site for 90 years in Hastings, had their lease terminated, with plans that the site be replaced with an NPD station. A local councillor criticised the proposal, saying that there were already enough petrol stations and that it was "disappointing" that the district would allow a petrol station to be placed there.

On 25 December 2025, NPD and Gull New Zealand announced plans to merge their New Zealand operations, subject to approval from the Commerce Commission. On 8 May 2026, the Commerce Commission approved the Astra Energy Group's bid to acquire NPD and Gull. While the two companies will merge, they will maintain their separate brands.
