= Te Herenga o Te Rā =

Photovoltaic power station in New Zealand

- Country: New Zealand
- Location: Ōpōtiki District
- Coordinates: 38°1′33.1″S 177°10′58.8″E
- Status: Operating
- Owner: Lodestone Energy

Solar farm
- Type: Flat-panel PV

Power generation
- Nameplate capacity: 33 MW AC (42 MW DC)
- Annual net output: 69 GWh

The Te Herenga o Te Rā solar farm is a photovoltaic power station near Waiotahe in the Ōpōtiki District of New Zealand. It was the first solar farm to be connected directly to New Zealand's national grid. The farm is owned by Lodestone Energy, and will generate 69 GWh of electricity a year, with a nameplate capacity of 42 MWp DC and 33 MW AC.

The farm uses elevated racks, allowing the area underneath the panels to be used for grazing or horticulture.

Construction of the farm began in December 2023. It began transmitting electricity to the grid in January 2025.

The farm was gifted the name "Te Herenga o Te Rā" ("The mooring place of the sun") by local iwi (tribe) Te Ūpokorehe.

On 30 July 2025 the farm survived a major flood, and was able to remain connected to the grid for almost the entire duration of the extreme rainfall event.

== See also ==
- Solar power in New Zealand
