= Te Puna Mauri ō Omaru =

Photovoltaic power station in New Zealand

- Country: New Zealand
- Location: Ruawai
- Coordinates: 36°6′55.56″S 174°1′36.19″E
- Commission date: December 2024; July 2025
- Construction cost: NZ$25 million
- Owner: Northpower

Solar farm
- Type: Flat-panel PV
- Site area: 30 ha

Power generation
- Nameplate capacity: 19.3 MW (20 MWp)

Te Puna Mauri ō Omaru is a photovoltaic power station in Ruawai, Northland, New Zealand. It is owned and operated by Northpower.

The project was announced in December 2023, and gifted the name "Te Puna Mauri ō Omaru" ("the energy source of Omaru") by local hapu Te Uri-o-Hau. It generated its first electricity in December 2024 and stage 2 was completed in July 2025.

== See also ==
- Solar power in New Zealand
