= Awatea =

Awatea is a Māori term meaning The dawning of a new day.

- The Forsyth Barr Stadium at University Plaza in Dunedin, New Zealand, known during planning as "Awatea Street Stadium" after its location
- Awatea, a ship used for troop transportation in World War II
- Awatea, a 1969 play by Bruce Mason
- Awatea, a marque of bordeaux-variety red wine from Te Mata Estate vintnery
- Aotearoa Wave and Tidal Energy Association (AWATEA), a New Zealand organisation

Awatea is also occasionally found as a unisex given name.
