= Twin Rivers Solar Farm =

Solar power station in New Zealand

- Country: New Zealand
- Location: Pamapuria
- Status: Operating
- Construction began: August 2024
- Commission date: December 2025
- Construction cost: NZ$40 million
- Owner: Rānui Generation

Solar farm
- Type: Flat-panel PV
- Site area: 33 ha

Power generation
- Nameplate capacity: 30.7 MW
- Annual net output: 42 GWh

The Twin Rivers Solar Farm is a photovoltaic power station at Pamapuria, near Kaitaia in the Far North District of New Zealand. The farm was built by Rānui Generation, and is rated at 31 MWp.

The project was first announced in July 2023. Construction began in August 2024 and the solar farm was commissioned in December 2025.

== See also ==
- Solar power in New Zealand
