= Aotearoa Wave and Tidal Energy Association =

The Aotearoa Wave and Tidal Energy Association (AWATEA) is a New Zealand organisation established in 2006 to promote renewable energy from marine sources. This includes energy from tides, waves and ocean currents.

Organisations involved in New Zealand include Genesis Energy, Meridian Energy and Crest Energy. Several projects are being developed, including Kaipara Tidal Power Station and another in Cook Strait.

Speaking at the 2007 conference, Jeanette Fitzsimons, then NZ Government spokesperson for Energy Efficiency stated that: "I remain very positive, and excited, at the prospects for marine energy in NZ. It is a perfect fit with our history as a maritime nation; the NZ love of the sea and sea going craft; the goals of the NZ Energy Strategy to get as close to 100% renewable electricity as we can; and to the Prime Minister’s aspirational goal to be carbon neutral and truly sustainable."

== See also ==
- Ocean power in New Zealand
- Electricity sector in New Zealand
- Renewable energy in New Zealand
