= Ardmore Solar Farm =

Photovoltaic power station in Auckland, New Zealand

Ardmore
- Country: New Zealand
- Location: Auckland
- Coordinates: 37°2′9.81″S 175°0′5.05″E
- Status: Operating
- Commission date: March 2025
- Owner: Kenny Energy
- Operator: Kiwi Solar

Solar farm
- Type: Flat-panel PV

Power generation
- Nameplate capacity: 13 MW DC (9.75 MW AC)
- Annual net output: 19 GWh

The Ardmore solar farm is a photovoltaic power station near Ardmore in Auckland, New Zealand. The farm is owned by Kiwi Solar. When complete, the farm will generate 15 GWh of electricity a year, with a nameplate capacity of 13 MWp DC.

Plans for the farm were announced in February 2024, and attracted local opposition. Construction began in late 2024, and was completed in March 2025, after a 5.5 month construction period.

== See also ==
- Solar power in New Zealand
