= Pukenui Solar Farm =

Solar Farm in New Zealand

- Country: New Zealand
- Location: Aupouri Peninsula
- Coordinates: 34°49′06″S 173°6′38″E
- Status: Operating
- Construction began: 1 July 2021
- Commission date: 16 October 2025
- Construction cost: NZ$30 million
- Owner: Aquila Capital

Solar farm
- Type: Flat-panel PV
- Collectors: 35,000
- Site area: 19 ha

Power generation
- Nameplate capacity: 20.8 MW DC (17.16 MW AC)
- Annual net output: 29.2 GWh

The Pukenui Solar Farm is a photovoltaic power station at Pukenui, near Houhora on the Aupouri Peninsula in the Far North District of New Zealand. The farm is owned by Aquila Capital, covering 19 hectares with a PV rating of 20.8 MWp and an inverter capacity of 17.2 MW. When announced, it was expected to be the largest solar farm in the country when complete.

Far North Solar Farm applied for resource consent for the project in February 2021. Construction began on 1 July 2021, with Prime Minister Jacinda Ardern turning the first sod. It was expected to be operational in the second half of 2022, but as of October 2022 the site was untouched. Earthworks started in late 2023. Construction started in April 2024, and the farm was commissioned in October 2025.

The farm was acquired by Aquila Capital following the winding up a joint venture between them and FNSF in December 2025.

== See also ==
- Solar power in New Zealand
