= Rangitaiki Solar Farm =

New Zealand solar power station

- Country: New Zealand
- Location: Whakatāne District
- Coordinates: 37°59′46.83″S 176°48′35.86″E
- Status: Operating
- Owner: Lodestone Energy

Solar farm
- Type: Flat-panel PV

Power generation
- Nameplate capacity: 23.7 MW AC (32.4 MW DC)
- Annual net output: 54 GWh

The Rangitaiki Solar Farm is a photovoltaic power station near Edgecumbe in the Whakatāne District of New Zealand. The farm is owned by Lodestone Energy. The farm has a capacity of 32 MW, and will generate 54 GWh a year.

Construction began in March 2023. As with Lodestone's other farms, Rangitaiki uses elevated racks, allowing the area underneath the panels to be used for sheep pasture. It began generating electricity in March 2024. Construction was completed in July 2024.

== See also ==
- Solar power in New Zealand
