= Te Rāhui Solar Farm =

Power station under construction in Taupō, New Zealand

- Country: New Zealand
- Location: Taupō District
- Coordinates: 38°53′44.49″S 176°25′25.55″E
- Status: Under construction
- Owner: Nova Energy

Solar farm
- Type: Flat-panel PV
- Collectors: 900,000
- Site area: 1022 ha

Power generation
- Nameplate capacity: 400 MW
- Annual net output: 650 GWh

The Te Rāhui solar farm is a photovoltaic power station under construction in the Taupō District of New Zealand. It is being built on a 1022 hectare site 35 km east of Taupō. The farm is owned by Nova Energy and will be the largest in New Zealand when complete.

The project applied for resource consent in September 2022. Resource consent was granted in November 2022.

In July 2024 Nova announced that the farm would be called Te Rāhui and would be built in two stages. In December 2024 Nova announced that it had signed a joint venture agreement with Meridian Energy to build and operate the farm.

The project will be built in two stages of 200 MW capacity each. Construction on the first stage began in August 2025, and the first solar panels were installed in May 2026. Commissioning of the first stage is expected in 2027.

== See also ==
- Solar power in New Zealand
