= Pāmu Rā ki Whitianga solar farm =

New Zealand solar power station

Pāmu Rā ki Whitianga Solar Farm
- Country: New Zealand
- Location: Whitianga, Thames-Coromandel District
- Coordinates: 36°51′2.01″S 175°39′47.33″E
- Status: Operating
- Construction began: 2024
- Owner: Lodestone Energy

Solar farm
- Type: Flat-panel PV
- Site area: 45 ha

Power generation
- Nameplate capacity: 33 MW DC (23.7 MW AC)
- Annual net output: 50 GWh

The Pāmu Rā ki Whitianga Solar Farm is a photovoltaic power station near Whitianga in the Thames-Coromandel District of New Zealand. The farm is owned by Lodestone Energy.

== Description ==
The farm has a capacity of 33 MWp DC and 23.7 MW AC.

Construction began in September 2024 and was 60% complete by April 2025. As with Lodestone's other farms, Pāmu Rā ki Whitianga uses elevated racks, allowing the area underneath the panels to be used for sheep grazing or horticulture.

The farm was gifted the name "Pāmu Rā ki Whitianga" ("solar farm of/to Whitianga") by local iwi Ngāti Hei.

The farm generated its first electricity for the grid in December 2025.

== See also ==
- Solar power in New Zealand
