= Kohirā Solar Farm =

Photovoltaic power station in New Zealand

Kohirā
- Country: New Zealand
- Location: Far North District
- Coordinates: 35°4′54″S 173°13′10″E
- Status: Operating
- Owner: Lodestone Energy

Solar farm
- Type: Flat-panel PV
- Solar tracker: Single-axis
- Site area: 20.5 ha

Power generation
- Nameplate capacity: 23.7 MW AC (33.3 MW DC)
- Annual net output: 56 GWh

The Kohirā solar farm is a photovoltaic power station near Kaitaia in the Far North District of New Zealand. The farm is owned by Lodestone Energy. The farm generates 56 GWh of electricity a year, with a nameplate capacity of 33.3 MWp DC and 23.7 MW AC.

The farm uses elevated racks, allowing the area underneath the panels to be used for sheep pasture.

Construction of the farm began in December 2022. It generated its first electricity in November 2023. It began transmitting electricity to the grid in February 2024. As the first solar farm in New Zealand to exceed 10 MW, Kohirā was also the first solar farm required to participate in the wholesale electricity market.

The farm was gifted the name "Kohirā" ("suncatcher") by local iwi Te Rarawa.

== See also ==
- Solar power in New Zealand
