= Papareireiā Solar Farm =

Power station in New Zealand

- Country: New Zealand
- Location: Kaipara District
- Coordinates: 36°5′25″S 174°20′50″E
- Status: Operating
- Construction cost: NZ$40 million
- Owner: Topu Tonu

Solar farm
- Type: Flat-panel PV

Power generation
- Nameplate capacity: 21 MW DC
- Annual net output: 32 GWh

The Papareireiā Solar Farm, also known as the Ryman Healthcare Solar Farm, is a photovoltaic power station near Maungaturoto in the Kaipara District of New Zealand. The farm is owned by a partnership of Tupu Tonu, Harbour Infrastructure and Purpose Capital, and will generate 32 GWh of electricity a year, with a nameplate capacity of 21 MWp DC. Its output will be supplied to Ryman Healthcare, meeting roughly two thirds of the company's annual electricity needs.

The farm was initially developed by Ryman Healthcare and Solar Bay, with the aim of supplying all the company's sites via an exclusive supply agreement.

Construction began in November 2024. It was gifted the name Papareireiā, which refers to the rays of the sun being consumed by the land. It was officially commissioned in December 2025.

== See also ==
- Solar power in New Zealand
