= Lauriston Solar Farm =

Photovoltaic power station in Canterbruy, New Zealand

- Country: New Zealand
- Location: Lauriston
- Coordinates: 43°43′51.56″S 171°47′21.95″E
- Status: Operating
- Construction began: April 2024
- Commission date: February 2025
- Construction cost: NZ$104 million
- Owner: Genesis Energy Limited

Solar farm
- Type: Flat-panel PV
- Site area: 93 ha

Power generation
- Nameplate capacity: 47 MW AC (63 MW DC)
- Annual net output: 97 GWh

The Lauriston Solar Farm is a photovoltaic power station at Lauriston in Canterbury. The farm is owned by a joint venture between Genesis Energy Limited and FRV Australia. The farm covers 93 hectares (230 acres) and generates 47 MW of electricity. It is currently the largest solar farm in New Zealand, though a larger solar plant is under construction near Taupō.

The project was originally announced by HES Aotearoa, who obtained resource consent in June 2022. The project was then bought by a joint venture between Genesis Energy and FRV Australia in February 2023. Construction was announced in January 2024, when Genesis signed a ten-year electricity purchase agreement for the farm. A sod-turning ceremony was held in April 2024, and construction began after that. By November 2024, Genesis Energy said the project was on track and would begin generated power in December 2024. The solar farm reached full capacity in February 2025, and was officially opened in April 2025.

Electricity generated at the solar farm is fed into EA Networks' distribution network at the nearby Lauriston zone substation. In May 2024, Genesis signed a ten year power supply contract with Spark New Zealand to see Spark take all power from the solar farm.

== See also ==
- Solar power in New Zealand
