= Kaipara Tidal Power Station =

Proposed tidal power project in New Zealand

- Country: New Zealand
- Location: Kaipara Harbour, Northland
- Coordinates: 36°25′S 174°10′E
- Status: Abandoned proposal
- Construction cost: $600 million
- Owner: Crest Energy

Tidal power station
- Type: Tidal stream generator

Power generation
- Units planned: 200 × 1.2 MW
- Nameplate capacity: 200 MW

External links
- Website: www.crest-energy.com

The Kaipara tidal power station was a proposed tidal power project to be located in the Kaipara Harbour. The project was being developed by Crest Energy, with an ultimate size of 200MW at a cost of $600 million. Consent for part of the project was granted in 2011, but it was put on hold in 2013 and has not progressed since.

Crest Energy planned to place up to 200 turbines at least 30 metres deep along a ten kilometre stretch of the main channel. Historical charts show this stretch of the channel has changed little over 150 years. The output of the turbines would cycle twice daily with the predictable rise and fall of the tide. Each turbine was expected to have a maximum output of 1.2 MW, and generate 0.75 MW averaged over time.

In 2013, it was announced that the project had been put on hold, and most of the shares in Crest Energy had been sold to Todd Energy. Uncertainty in the power market was blamed for the demise of the project by Anthony Hopkins, founding director of Crest Energy.

== Kaipara Harbour ==
The entrance to Kaipara Harbour, one of the largest harbours in the world, is a channel to the Tasman Sea. It narrows to a width of 6 kilometres (3.7 mi), and is over 50 metres (160 ft) deep in parts. On average, Kaipara tides rise and fall 2.10 metres (6.9 ft). At high tide, nearly 1000 square kilometres are flooded. Spring tidal flows reach 9 km/h (5 knots) in the entrance channel and move 1,990 million cubic meters per tidal movement or 7,960 million cubic meters daily.

== Consents ==
In 2008, the Northland Regional Council granted resource consents for only 100 turbines. This was appealed to the Environment Court, which in 2011 set conditions for the project allowing for 200 turbines, with many conditions including staged development. The minister of conservation granted resource consents for the project in March 2011. The consents lapsed 10 years after they were granted, in early 2021.

== See also ==
- Ocean power in New Zealand
- Aotearoa Wave and Tidal Energy Association
- List of power stations in New Zealand
