= Waiterimu Solar Farm =

Proposed power station in New Zealand

- Country: New Zealand
- Location: Waikato District
- Coordinates: 37.476°S 175.271°E
- Status: Proposed
- Construction cost: NZ$100 million
- Owner: Genesis Energy Limited

Solar farm
- Type: Flat-panel PV
- Site area: 660 ha

Power generation
- Nameplate capacity: 300 MW

The Waiterimu Solar Farm is a proposed photovoltaic power station in the Waiterimu Valley, near Ohinewai in the Waikato District of New Zealand. The farm will be owned by Island Green Power Ltd. When complete the farm will cover 380 hectares and generate 300 GWh/year of electricity.

The project has been opposed by local residents.

On 14 April 2023 the project was approved for the fast-track consent process under the Covid-19 Recovery (Fast-Track Consenting) Act 2020. On 20 April it announced a governance agreement with Te Riu o Waikato, and that it had moved the project from Waiterimu to two sites in the Rangiriri and Waerenga area. Consent was granted on 22 December 2023.

In October 2025 the project was acquired by Genesis Energy Limited.

== See also ==
- Solar power in New Zealand
