= Gull New Zealand =

New Zealand fuel distribution company

- Logo of Gull New Zealand
- Industry: Fuel retailing
- Founded: 1998
- Founder: Gull Petroleum
- Headquarters: Auckland, New Zealand
- Area served: New Zealand
- Parent: Allegro Funds
- Website: gull.nz

Gull New Zealand is a New Zealand petroleum distribution company and petrol station chain. It is the country's third largest fuel retailer, with 113 locations in New Zealand including 45 in Auckland.

== History ==
Gull Petroleum began as a Western Australian petrol company founded by Keith Mitchell, Mark Quackenbush and Terry Lockwood in 1976. Real estate agent Fred Rae bought into the company in 1978 and became the controlling shareholder in 1994.

Rae established Gull New Zealand in 1998 as the New Zealand arm of the business. It opened its first retail outlet in Frankton, Hamilton in 1999.

In 2010, Gull began selling a 5%-blend of biodiesel under the brand name Diesel Max. The biodiesel was originally sourced locally from Environ Fuels, and available at 5 of out Gull's 100 petrol stations.

In 2014, Gull switched from using locally produced biodiesel to an imported blend from Australia, citing "local supply issues".

In December 2016, Rae agreed terms to sell Gull New Zealand to Caltex Australia (later Ampol). The sale was completed in July 2017.

In 2019, Gull opened its first South Island site.

In December 2020, Gull discontinued their biodiesel brand, citing issues with cost, scalability, and import supply chains. That same year, Z Energy announced that they were shutting down their biodiesel factory as it was not economical.

In March 2021, Gull opened its 100th site in East Tāmaki, Auckland. The opening was celebrated by cutting 100 cents off prices for the first 100 minutes. In August 2021, Ampol announced its intentions to purchase Z Energy. Its ownership of Gull New Zealand was identified as a potential roadblock to the purchase. In October 2021, UBS valued the company at AU$400 million to AU$600 million.

In February 2022, Ampol ruled out a share float of Gull. Two weeks later, it agreed to an outright sale to Australian investment firm Allegro Funds for $572 million, in order to get Commerce Commission approval to buy Z Energy. The sale was conditional on the Z Energy purchase being approved, and proceeds from the sale would be used to fund the Z Energy purchase.

Ampol agreed to continue supply Gull with petrol for five years following the sale. Allegro Funds expressed an interest in expanding Gull.

On 25 December 2025, Gull and the NPD petrol company announced plans to merge their New Zealand operations, subject to approval from the Commerce Commission. On 8 May 2026, the Commerce Commission approved the Astra Energy Group's bid to acquire Gull's parent company, GNZ Holdco Limited, and NPD's parent company, NPD Group Investments Limited. While the two companies will merge, they will maintain their separate brands.
