= Lodestone Energy =

New Zealand electricity generator company

- Type: Public
- Industry: Electricity generation
- Founded: 2019
- Headquarters: New Zealand
- Key people: Gary Holden
- Website: lodestoneenergy.co.nz

Lodestone Energy Limited is a New Zealand electricity generation and retail company that specialises in the construction and operation of photovoltaic power stations. As of August 2026, it operates five solar farms, with one more under construction.

== History ==
In May 2021, the company announced plans for five solar power stations, capable of generating one percent of New Zealand's power. In June 2022, it completed a $300 million capital raise to fund its initial projects. Investors in the company included Rod Drury, Sam Morgan, and Stephen Tindall.

In July 2023, Lodestone Energy was granted a NZ$15 million working capital facility by Green Investment Finance to fund its solar farm developments. In October 2023, it announced a partnership with British joint venture HES Aotearoa to develop a further nine solar farms. In January 2024, the company announced plans to build three solar farms in Canterbury as part of the partnership. In April 2024, it completed a $55 million capital raise to fund further expansion.

Construction of the company's first solar farm, Kohirā, began in early 2023 and was completed in February 2024. In September 2023, Lodestone Energy signed a long-term supply contract with The Warehouse Group to supply their retail stores with electricity. In August 2024 the company announced it had acquired sites for two new solar farms in the Manawatu from Kiwi Solar, and that it planned a third.

In April 2025 the company entered the electricity retail market, focusing on commercial and industrial customers.

In September 2026 the company announced that it was seeking to raise $75-100 million via an initial public offering, and would list on the NZX. In October 2026 the company completed a $75 million IPO and listed on the NZX.

In November 2026 the company reported a $9.4 million loss for the six months to September 2026.

== Power stations ==
=== Operational ===
Name	Type	Location	Capacity (MW)	Annual generation (average GWh)	Commissioned
Clandeboye	Solar	Clandeboye, Canterbury	28	43	2026
Kohirā	Solar	Kaitaia, Northland	32	55	2024
Pāmu Rā ki Whitianga solar farm	Solar	Whitianga, Waikato	32	49	2025
Rangitaiki	Solar	Edgecumbe, Bay of Plenty	32	54	2024
Te Herenga o Te Rā	Solar	Waiotahe, Bay of Plenty	42	69	2025

=== Proposed / under construction ===
Name	Type	Location	Projected capacity (MW)	Status
Bunnythorpe	Solar	Bunnythorpe, Manawatu	26	Proposed
Central Hawke's Bay	Solar	Ongaonga, Hawke's Bay	31.5	Under construction
Dunsandel	Solar	Dunsandel, Canterbury		Consented
Haldon	Solar	Mackenzie District	220	Proposed
Kairanga	Solar	Palmerston North, Manawatu	27	Proposed
Lodestone One	Solar	Dargaville, Northland	60	Proposed
Mount Somers	Solar	Mount Somers, Canterbury		Consented
