= Tauhei Solar Farm =

Solar farm in the Waikato Region, New Zealand

Tauhei solar farm
- Country: New Zealand
- Location: Te Aroha
- Coordinates: 37°35′18″S 175°43′18″E
- Status: Operating
- Construction began: April 2025
- Commission date: July 2026
- Owner: Harmony Energy

Solar farm
- Type: Flat-panel PV
- Collectors: 329,000
- Site area: 182 ha 450 acres

Power generation
- Nameplate capacity: 150 MW_{ac} (202 MW_{p})
- Annual net output: 280 GWh

The Tauhei solar farm is a photovoltaic power station in New Zealand. The farm was constructed near Te Aroha in the Matamata-Piako District by UK-based Harmony Energy, and it is rated at 202 MW_{p} / 150 MW_{ac}.

The project applied for fast-track consent under the Covid-19 Recovery (Fast-Track Consenting) Act 2020 in December 2021. The project converted a dairy farm to sheep, with farming continuing alongside electricity generation. Consent was granted in September 2022. Construction began in April 2025, and was completed in 2026. The first row of solar panels was installed in October 2025. The final panel was installed in May 2026, and the farm began exporting electricity to the grid in July 2026. The farm was officially opened in November 2026.

== See also ==
- Solar power in New Zealand
