= 2022 New Zealand fuel tax subsidy =

Labour government initiative

In March 2022 the New Zealand government reduced a fuel tax after a cost of living crisis brought on by the COVID-19 pandemic and the Russian invasion of Ukraine. The measure was originally intended as a temporary measure, with an initial duration of three months, however was extended three times in response to ongoing high fuel prices. The subsidy eventually ended on 1 July 2023, with the fuel tax returning to the full amount.

== Background ==
In late 2021 and early 2022, New Zealand was suffering from a cost of living crisis and higher-than-usual inflation. This was caused by a range of factors, including responses to the COVID-19 pandemic and the Russian invasion of Ukraine. In February 2022, fuel prices had risen by 13%.

== History ==
The cuts started in March 2022. Fuel prices would be reduced by 25 cents, and train and bus fares halved; there was also a 36% diesel discount. Originally, these were planned to last only three months, ending in June. Prime Minister Jacinda Ardern at the time said that this would save between $11.50 and $17.25 per tank of fuel. In the May 2022 New Zealand budget, the subsidy was extended until January 2023. In December 2022, the government extended the cuts until the end of February, then would halve the cuts to 12.5 cents per litre and end the subsidy on 31 March. In February 2023, the government announced that it would extend the fuel cuts until the end of June.

On 1 July 2023, the fuel tax cuts were removed. People lined up at petrol stations before the tax cuts ended, and many people took multiple trips. Some people urged motorists to refuel early to avoid queues or fuel shortages. The end of the subsidy caused a large increase in the number of Gaspy users, a fuel price monitoring app.

== Cost ==
The cost to the government of the initial three-month period was $350 million. The extension until June 2023 cost $718 million. In total, it was estimated that $2 billion was spent on the subsidies.
