= Project Aqua =

Proposed hydroelectric scheme for Waitaki River, New Zealand

Project Aqua was a hydroelectric scheme proposed for the lower Waitaki River in New Zealand. Although the scheme had considerable support from some locals, it met with opposition from many other groups, and Meridian Energy decided in March 2004 not to go ahead with the project.

== The plan ==
The plan was to divert river water at the rate of up to 280 cubic metres per second into a separate canal for six power stations. This was on top of the three dams already in the upper Waitaki River. The scheme would have produced approximately 520MW of power – enough to supply a city the size of Christchurch.

== Objections ==
The objections to the scheme included land issues, the disruption during construction, and concerns about the sustainability of the river. Meridian Energy was working on a large scale mitigation process, whereby issues could be identified and mitigated, when the scheme was finally cancelled.

== Abandonment and impact ==
On 29 March 2004, Meridian announced that they would not continue with Project Aqua. Among their reasons were the uncertainty in gaining access to the water, that Aqua could not come on line soon enough to meet New Zealand's growing electricity demand, the amount of money it was costing the company, design changes due to geology reports, and the Resource Management Act making it difficult to get consent for large water based projects.

Meridian's 2004 annual report states that they lost NZ$38.7 million on the project. At the time of cancellation they had spent considerably more than this, but much of the expenditure was for assets such as land that they would later sell.

== Possible alternative scheme ==
Subsequently, Meridian proceeded to develop an alternative hydroelectric scheme along the same stretch of the Waitaki River – the North Bank tunnel project. They received water uses consents from Environment Canterbury in December 2008 but work on the project was suspended in January 2013.
