= North Bank tunnel =

Former hydroelectric proposal in New Zealand

North Bank tunnel project
- Country: New Zealand
- Location: Waitaki River, New Zealand
- Coordinates: 44.8°S 170.61°E
- Status: Indefinitely suspended proposal
- Owner: Meridian Energy

Thermal power station
- Primary fuel: Hydropower

Power generation
- Nameplate capacity: 200 MW (270,000 hp)

The North Bank tunnel concept was a hydroelectric scheme being developed by Meridian Energy on the Waitaki River in Canterbury, New Zealand. The $993 million project was expected to produce an additional 1,100 to 1,400 gigawatt-hours (4,000 to 5,000 TJ) per annum, and take up to 260 cubic metres per second (9,200 cu ft/s) of water from Lake Waitaki. The project would have resulted in a 275 gigawatt-hours (990 TJ) per annum reduction in output from the Waitaki hydro station.

Discovery of geological faultlines prompted a rethink of the project, including consideration of using a canal instead of a tunnel.

Work on the project was suspended in January 2013 due to a forecast of flat demand for electricity for the next five years. Resource consents for the scheme lapsed in 2016.

This project is at a similar location to Project Aqua, a hydroelectric power proposal abandoned by Meridian in 2004.

== Resource consent process ==
In December 2008, Environment Canterbury granted water use consents for this project. Appeals against this decision were made by Ngāi Tahu, Ngāi Tahu Fishers People Inc, the Lower Waitaki River Management Society and Black Point farmer Garth Dovey. The appeal hearings were held in the Environment Court during June and July 2009, with water rights being granted in September 2009.

== See also ==
- Electricity sector in New Zealand
- List of power stations in New Zealand
