= Gaspy =

Petrol monitoring app for New Zealand

Gaspy is a crowd-sourced petrol price monitoring application for New Zealand. It is based in Tauranga and available for both iPhone and Android. Prices are entered into the app by motorists. As of March 2020 the app has half a million users. A founder of Gaspy says that 97 percent of the app's data is accurate, and that the data is externally audited.

== History ==
Gaspy was started in 2016 by Larry Green and three other directors of Hwem, a technology company. It was a "philanthropic sideproject, 'for kicks'". Originally Gaspy was made to demonstrate engineering capabilities of Hwem to potential clients. It was also created as a game, where members would play as characters who would achieve spy ranks depending on how much they contribute to the app.

Once the app reached 200,000, the Commerce Commission, who was studying fuel prices, used Gaspy's data. The study found that consumers were paying too much for fuel, and made propositions on how to make the market more competitive. In 2020 Gaspy reached 500,000 members.

In 2023 after the 2022 New Zealand fuel tax subsidy was removed, Gaspy membership numbers surged. In one day, it received an increase of 6500 members, compared to its usual 500 new members per day. During this time, Gaspy reached 146,500 active users in a day, compared to numbers averaging between 35,000 and 60,000.
