= Fred Rae =

Western Australian businessman (1931–2019)

Frederick William Rae (27 October 1931 – 17 January 2019), more commonly known as Fred Rae, was a Western Australian businessman who bought into Gull Petroleum in 1978 for $30,000.

== Early life ==
Rae was born in Mundijong, Western Australia on 27 October 1931 to parents Robert and Edith, both of whom were nurses. He had three older siblings, Jim, Grace, and John. His father was killed by a drunk driver when Rae was 14 years old.

Upon leaving school, Rae studied at Leederville Technical College, and apprenticed as a carpenter. He worked with his brothers until he obtained his builder's licence. Rae worked as a contractor for CBH, and gained a good reputation, eventually becoming CBH's preferred contractor.

== Family ==
Rae married Norma Catherin Dowding on 29 November 1962, and they had a daughter Jill and son Nicholas.

== Business ==
Rae bought into Gull Petroleum in 1978 for $30,000. It was during the early expansion of Gull when two of the founders, Keith Mitchell and Mark Quackenbush, were looking to take over Gingers Roadhouse that they met Rae. Rae was so impressed with Gull's expansion and their future plans that he asked to buy into the company. Over three decades, Gull continued to expand to more than 100 petrol station across Western Australia.

Following value and supply disputes with the local Kwinana Oil Refinery, Rae began importing fuel from Singapore in 1993. This was the first time an independent fuel retailer in Australia imported fuel, and the price advantage enabled Gull stations to compete with market-leader BP.

In 1998 Gull expanded into New Zealand.

In 2010, the Australian operation was sold for approximately $500 million, and in 2016 the New Zealand business was sold for more than $300 million.

== Politics ==
Rae was a councillor for the City of Belmont for sixteen years, and mayor from 1979 to 1987.

== Death and legacy ==
Rae died on 17 January 2019, aged 87, in his family home.

Rae was recognised among the 100 most influential Western Australian businesspeople in The West Australian's 2013 list.
