= Renewable energy in New Zealand =

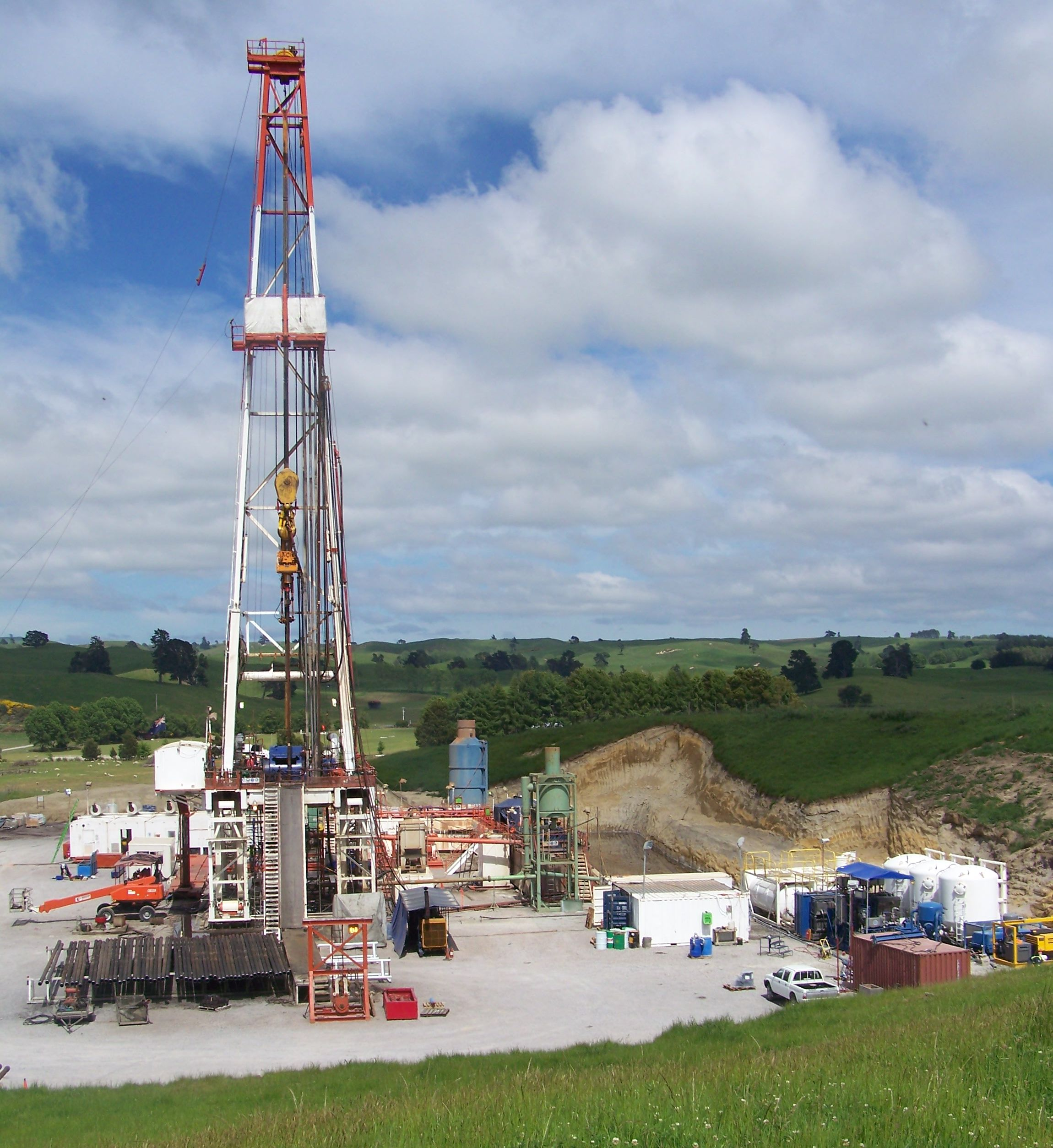
Geothermal drilling at Te Mihi, New Zealand

Approximately 44% of primary energy (heat and power) is from renewable energy sources in New Zealand. Approximately 87% of electricity comes from renewable energy, primarily hydropower and geothermal power.

== Renewable energy by type ==
=== Renewable electricity ===
Renewable electricity in New Zealand is primarily made from hydropower. In 2022, 87% of the electricity generated in New Zealand came from renewable sources. In Q4 2025, it was 96.4%.

In September 2007, Prime Minister Helen Clark announced a national target of 90 percent renewable electricity by 2025, with wind energy to make up much of that increase.

=== Solar power ===
Solar technologies in New Zealand only became affordable alternatives in the mid-2010s, compared to previous renewable offerings. The uptake in the residential and commercial market, though slow, has increased steadily. As with all renewable options, price of generation is key to investment in the sector. It is only such changes in pricing that may see solar generation plants in the future.

There is concern in New Zealand about the negative environmental impact of large-scale solar generation sites. Greenpeace Aotearoa New Zealand advocates for household solar projects to be given priority over large scale commercial projects, citing concern that commercial solar, while renewable, is not necessarily sustainable. Conservation organisation Forest & Bird has formally objected to a large-scale solar proposal on environmental grounds.

=== Solar hot water ===
Installation of solar hot water heating systems is increasing in New Zealand due in part to government incentive schemes.

=== Bioenergy ===
According to the New Zealand Bioenergy Association, more than 10 percent of New Zealand's energy currently comes from bioenergy. Biodiesel, bioethanol and biomass (generally in the form of wood) are all used in New Zealand as a source of renewable energy.

==== Biomass ====
New Zealand is rich in biomass from wood and waste which can be used as fuel. Biomass is sourced primarily from in-forest and wood processing residues and municipal wood waste. This can be processed into pellets, chip or hog fuel.

Wood fuels are sustainable and carbon-neutral and can provide New Zealand with a greener economy, less dependent on fossil fuels.

New Zealand Ministry of Business, Innovation and Employment data shows wood fuel is the cleanest energy consumed for industrial process heat by a large margin.

The Bioenergy Association of New Zealand has investigated the potential for greenhouse gas reduction brought about by switching from fossil fuel to wood biomass for industrial heat. It assessed that by 2050 New Zealand could more than double 2017 biomass energy supply, providing up to 27% of NZ's energy needs and realising a 15% reduction in greenhouse gas emissions.

Milk processing provides current examples of biomass use in industry:

- reducing coal use, through co-firing
- replacing coal use

Biomass is also used for heating in hospitals, schools and universities.

=== Pumped energy storage ===
When the water in lakes used for hydro-electricity runs low, coal and gas fired power stations have been used to make up the shortfall. In 2021, the Ardern government invested $11.5 million to investigate the feasibility of storing energy by pumping water to Lake Onslow in Central Otago. The lake could store up to 8 terawatt-hours of electricity or approximately one fifth of the country's consumption. The pumping would use power when it is plentiful and cheap, including wind power. Critics have argued that the scheme could upset the market by placing a cap on electricity prices.

== See also ==
- Biofuel in New Zealand
- Energy in New Zealand
- Geothermal power in New Zealand
- Hydroelectric power in New Zealand
- Ocean power in New Zealand
- Renewable energy by country
- Renewable energy commercialisation
- Solar hot water in New Zealand
- Solar power in New Zealand
- Wind power in New Zealand
