= Lauriston, New Zealand =

Coordinates: 43°44′S 171°47′E

Lauriston
- Township
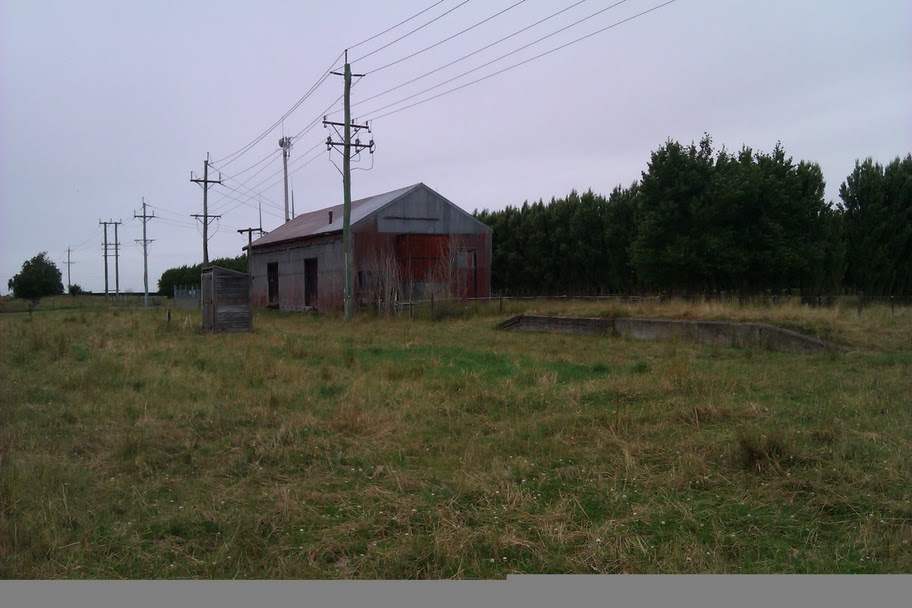
- Lauriston goods shed
- Interactive map of Lauriston
- Country: New Zealand
- Region: Canterbury
- Territorial authority: Ashburton District
- Electorates: Rangitata; Te Tai Tonga (Māori)

Government
  - Territorial authority: Ashburton District Council
  - Regional council: Environment Canterbury
  - Mayor of Ashburton: Liz McMillan
  - Rangitata MP: James Meager
  - Te Tai Tonga MP: Tākuta Ferris

Area
  - Total: 97.79 km^{2} (37.76 sq mi)

Population (2023 census)
  - Total: 252
  - Density: 2.58/km^{2} (6.67/sq mi)
- Postcode: 7776
- Area code: 03

Lauriston is a lightly populated locality in the Canterbury region of New Zealand's South Island. It is situated on the Canterbury Plains south of the Rakaia River, some 20 kilometres (12 mi) inland from Rakaia. It was named after one of its pioneer settlers with the name of Laurie.

== Solar Farm ==
The Lauriston Solar Farm is a photovoltaic power station under construction. Project completion is expected in 2025.

== Demographics ==
Lauriston locality covers 97.97 km^{2} (37.83 sq mi). It is partly in the Cairnbrae and partly in the Chertsey statistical areas.

Historical population
Year	Pop.	±% p.a.
2006	228	—
2013	255	+1.61%
2018	261	+0.47%
2023	252	−0.70%

Lauriston had a population of 252 in the 2023 New Zealand census, a decrease of 9 people (−3.4%) since the 2018 census, and a decrease of 3 people (−1.2%) since the 2013 census. There were 132 males and 123 females in 93 dwellings. There were 54 people (21.4%) aged under 15 years, 45 (17.9%) aged 15 to 29, 135 (53.6%) aged 30 to 64, and 27 (10.7%) aged 65 or older.

People could identify as more than one ethnicity. The results were 76.2% European (Pākehā), 9.5% Māori, 3.6% Pasifika, 16.7% Asian, and 2.4% other, which includes people giving their ethnicity as "New Zealander". English was spoken by 97.6%, Māori by 2.4%, and other languages by 10.7%. No language could be spoken by 3.6% (e.g. too young to talk). New Zealand Sign Language was known by 1.2%. The percentage of people born overseas was 23.8, compared with 28.8% nationally.

Religious affiliations were 38.1% Christian, 4.8% Hindu, 1.2% Māori religious beliefs, 3.6% Buddhist, and 1.2% other religions. People who answered that they had no religion were 45.2%, and 9.5% of people did not answer the census question.

Of those at least 15 years old, 30 (15.2%) people had a bachelor's or higher degree, 114 (57.6%) had a post-high school certificate or diploma, and 54 (27.3%) people exclusively held high school qualifications. 21 people (10.6%) earned over $100,000 compared to 12.1% nationally. The employment status of those at least 15 was 117 (59.1%) full-time, 33 (16.7%) part-time, and 3 (1.5%) unemployed.

== Education ==
Lauriston School is a contributing primary school for years 1 to 6 with a roll of 95 (as of July 2026). It opened in 1883.
