= Aquila Capital =

Investment management company, focusing on sustainable investments and real assets

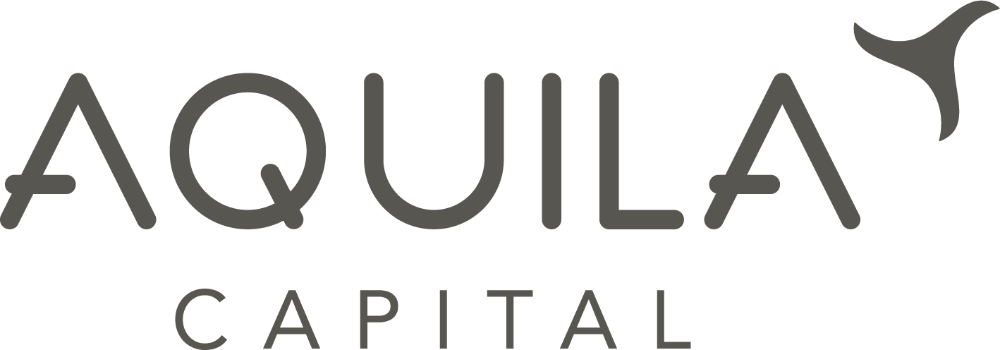
- Type: Private (GmbH)
- Industry: Financial services
- Founded: 2001; 25 years ago
- Headquarters: Hamburg, Germany
- Area served: Worldwide
- Key people: Roman Rosslenbroich, CEO; Dieter Rentsch, CIO
- Products: Sustainable investments, including solar pv, wind, hydropower and battery storage, green logistics, real estate, data centers, energy efficiency, forestry, and infrastructure
- Number of employees: 400+ (2019)
- Parent: Aquila Group
- Website: www.aquila-capital.de/en/

Aquila Capital is an investment management company with headquarters in Hamburg, Germany. It was founded in 2001 by Roman Rosslenbroich and Dieter Rentsch. Aquila Capital focuses on real assets and sustainable investments. The company manages more than €14.7 billion for institutional investors and is among Europe’s leading investment companies in climate change mitigation.

== History ==
The company was founded in 2001 and began investing in real assets, especially agriculture and forestry, followed by hydropower (including storage), finally raising funds for solar and wind energy, logistics, and real estate. The company is focused on sustainable investments with the aim to support the decarbonization of the world’s infrastructure in light of climate change.

In 2016, Aquila Capital received public attention for launching a €500 million vehicle to invest in infrastructure assets and funds. It was open to both institutional and wealthy private investors. In 2018, Aquila Capital financed the expansion of European hydropower by partnering with a Dutch pension investor. Furthermore, Aquila Capital is the portfolio adviser of Aquila European Renewables (AER), which raised €154.3 million during its initial public offering (IPO) in May 2020. AER is both listed on the London Stock Exchange and since October 2023 also on Euronext Dublin.

In 2018, the company received the Swedish Renewable Energy Award for its long-time commitment to transitioning to a low-carbon society.

In 2019, the infrastructure arm of Daiwa Securities, a Japanese investment bank and the country’s the second-largest brokerage firm, acquired a 40 % stake in Aquila Capital which marked the company’s commitment to further expand its global presence.

In 2021, Aquila Capital’s holding company Aquila Group bundled its clean energy development capacities in Aquila Clean Energy, an integrated clean energy business that combines the technical expertise required to develop greenfield projects with the financial capabilities to structure capital and manage merchant market risk. In September 2022, Aquila Clean Energy received a €1 billion financing by a build-to-sell construction facility from the European Investment Bank and a consortium of seven commercial banks, backed by the European Union’s InvestEU programme, to support the development of renewable energy assets in Southern Europe. It was one of the biggest loans ever granted by the European Investment Bank under a project finance structure.

Currently, Aquila Capital ranks among the most significant investment managers in Europe. The company's main business areas are renewable energy, real estate, energy efficiency, forestry, and data centers.

== Corporate structure ==
Aquila Capital is part of Aquila Group, a holding company for investment management and asset development companies active in EMEA and APAC. Aquila Capital is a regulated Alternative Investment Fund Manager (AIFM) licensed under German law and subject to supervision of the German Federal Financial Supervisory Authority (BaFin). Affiliated companies, and brands include Aquila Clean Energy (EMEA and APAC), AQ Compute (data center business), AQ Ampere (solar pv greenfield development) and Green Logistics.

Aquila Capital and the Aquila Group are managed by Roman Rosslenbroich (CEO) and Dieter Rentsch (CIO), Florian Becker (COO), Christian Ohl (CFO) and Michaela Maria Eder von Grafenstein. Rosslen-broich and Rentsch are both co-founders of the company. An advisory board of well-known industry experts supports the management; members are Hans Joachim Schellnhuber and Klaus Naumann, for example.

== Business activities ==
Aquila Capital has invested over €3 billion in solar assets and more than €2 billion in wind assets. The combined Aquila Group energy plants together provide a power capacity of currently 14.6 gigawatts. The current operative portfolio avoids around 1.2 million tonnes of greenhouse gases annually, which equals to the emissions of approximately 70,000 European households.

Aquila Capital is initiator of AQ Acentor, a Spanish residential real estate company.

In 2022 Aquila Capital announced a partnership with Australian-owned company FNSF Ltd to build a 1GW pipeline of utility-scale solar plants across New Zealand. Several of the plants forming the pipeline attracted opposition from local and environmental groups, and national media in New Zealand reported on the fraught business history of FNSF Ltd's directors, including complaints relating to a previous solar company and a formal warning from the New Zealand Commerce Commission.
