= Northpower =

New Zealand electricity generator company

- Industry: Electricity distribution
- Predecessor: North Auckland Electric Power Board
- Founded: 1920
- Headquarters: Whangārei, New Zealand
- Area served: Whangarei and Kaipara districts
- Key people: Nikki Davies-Colley (Chair); Andrew McLeod (Chief Executive)
- Revenue: US$361 million (Group)
- Operating income: $53.7 M (Group)
- Total assets: $457.9 M
- Number of employees: 1,000
- Parent: Northpower Electric Power Trust
- Website: northpower.com

Northpower Limited (Northpower) is an electricity distribution company, based in Whangārei, New Zealand.

Northpower owns and manages the electricity lines network in the Whangārei and Kaipara districts. The service area covers 5,700 km^{2} and extends from Topuni in the south, to Bland Bay in the north. In addition to the residential and commercial customers in the region, the network also serves the New Zealand Refinery, Golden Bay Cement and the Fonterra dairy plant at Kauri.

== Ownership ==
The company is 100% owned by the Northpower Electric Power Trust on behalf of electricity consumers in the Whangarei and Kaipara districts. The Trust is governed by seven Trustees elected every three years at the same time as the local body elections.

The Northpower Electric Power Trust (NEPT) Deed requires that options for the future ownership of shares in Northpower are reviewed every five years. The Trustees of the NEPT must consult with Northpower consumers to determine if the current Trust ownership structure is what consumers want, or if consumers would prefer a change. Following consultation with the people of the Kaipara and Whangarei Districts between February and June 2012, a decision was made at a public meeting of the Trust for Northpower to remain in consumer ownership.

== Distribution network ==
The Northpower subtransmission and distribution network is connected to the national grid via five Transpower substations located at Bream Bay (close to the Marsden Point Oil Refinery), Dargaville, Maungatapere, Maungaturoto and the suburb of Kensington in Whangarei.

=== Network statistics ===
Northpower Limited network statistics for the year ending 31 March 2024
Parameter	Value
Regulatory asset base	$386 million
Line charge revenue	$71.0 million
Capital expenditure	$43.4 million
Operating expenditure	$36.2 million
Customer connections	63,782
Energy delivered	791 GWh
Peak demand	158 MW
Total line length	6,218 km
Distribution and low-voltage overhead lines	4,690 km
Distribution and low-voltage underground cables	1,179 km
Subtransmission lines and cables	349 km
Poles	55,007
Distribution transformers	7,682
Zone substation transformers	43
Average interruption duration (SAIDI)	418 minutes
Average interruption frequency (SAIFI)	4.99

== History ==
The history of Northpower dates back to 1920 when the Northern Wairoa Hydro Electric Power Board was formed. The main predecessor organisation was the North Auckland Electric Power Board which commenced operations in 1929. The trading name 'Northpower' was adopted from 1 May 1990.

In 1993, Northpower purchased the small hydro-electric power station at Wairua Falls, near Titoki.

The Electricity Industry Reform Act was passed in 1998, and this required that all electricity companies be split into either the lines (network) business or the supply business (generating and/or selling electricity) by 1 April 1999. The energy retail business of Northpower was sold to ECNZ with effect from 1 November 1998, and renamed Northpower Energy. The name was later changed to Meridian Energy (1999).

== Wairua Falls hydro scheme ==
Northpower owns and operates the Wairua power station owned near Titoki. This station was built in the early 1900s with the first of the generators installed in 1916. The original machines are still operating. The water canal intake was upgraded in 2009. New weir flap gates have also been installed. The power station's aging control system has also been replaced. A 4th generator was installed at the site in 2007.

The typical annual energy output from the station is 22 GWh.

== Subsidiaries ==
- Northpower Contracting
- Northpower Fibre
- Northpower Renewables
- Northpower Future Energy

== See also ==
- Electricity sector in New Zealand
