= Solar hot water in New Zealand =

Solar thermal energy

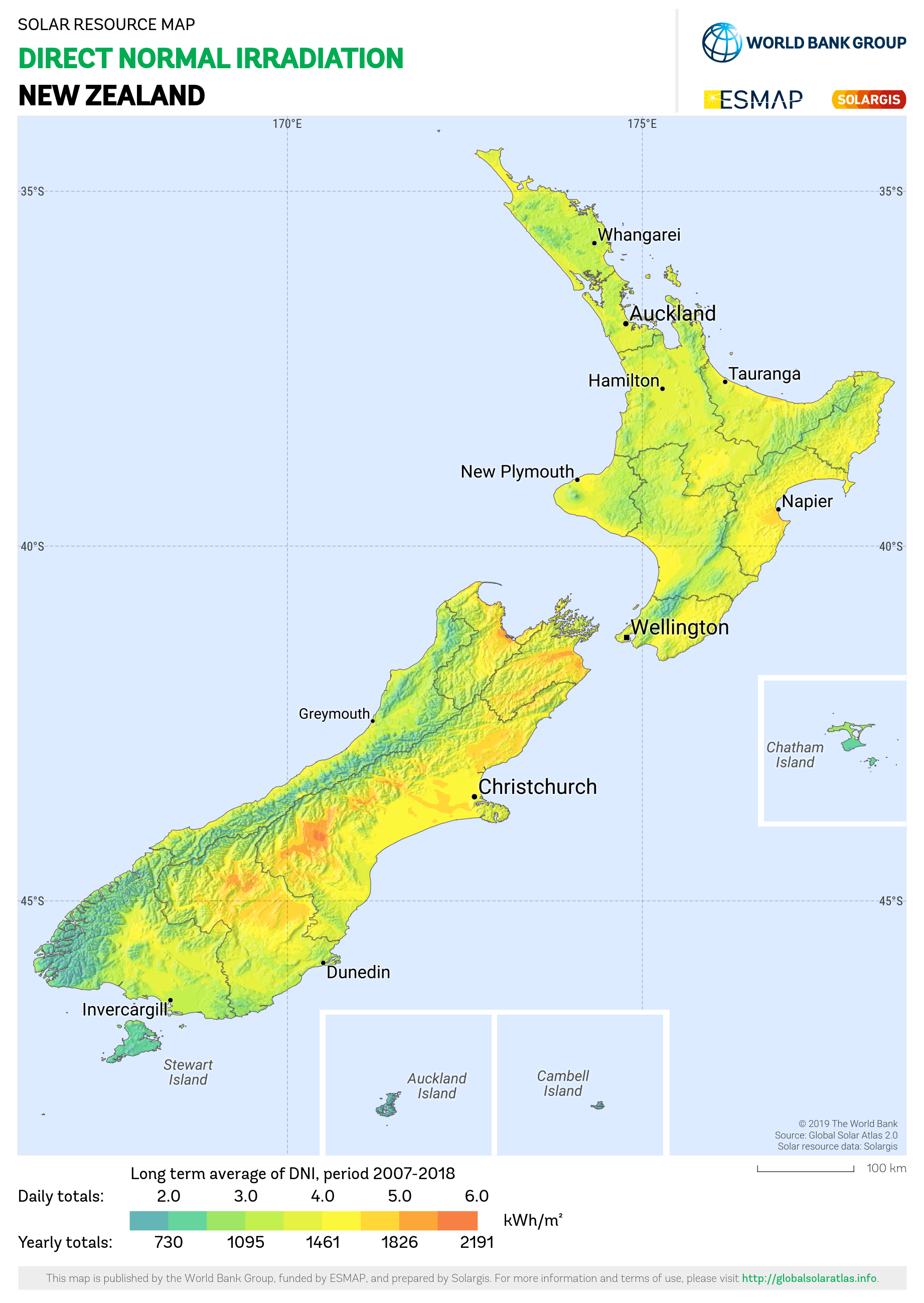
Solar thermal potential of New Zealand

Solar thermal technologies had a sizable initial uptake in the pioneering days of the 1970s. By 2001 more than 40 GWh was produced from solar hot water technologies, equating to 0.1% of the total electricity consumption in New Zealand. In 2006 the government announced an investment of $15.5 million over the first three and a half years of a five-year Solar water heating program to increase the number of solar hot water heating installations. By 2006 there were about 35,000 solar hot water installations on domestic and commercial buildings. As of 2025 there are no subsidies from the government.

== Barriers to adoption ==
The main barrier for the installation of solar hot water systems is the initial capital investment. Other barriers are the conservatism of the building industry, lack of influence on increasing the sale price of houses, conflicting interest between housing investors and home-owners, lack of adequate information about solar hot water heating and the cost of consent which is not needed for solar-PV. In the 2010s and 2020s the competition from other green energy solutions such as heat pumps and solar-PV technology increased which dropped more in cost-effectiveness in the last decade.

== Cost-effectiveness ==
Solar thermal systems can supply 60-70% of hot water needs during sunny months. With basic servicing and maintenance, solar hardware can last upwards of 20 years and requires minimal hands-on maintenance, aside from keeping the solar panels dust-free.

The initial investment is higher, with costs starting around $6,000 for a system suitable for a 3-4 person household. Solar collectors are less efficient during wet, wintry, and cloudy days, necessitating a boost system to cover hot water needs. Proper panel positioning is crucial, as panels must be north-facing and angled correctly to maximize sun exposure.

== Statistics ==
Data on the quantity of solar thermal energy utilised is not collected by the MBIE.

== See also ==
- Renewable energy in New Zealand
- Solar power in New Zealand
