= Gull Petroleum =

Australian petroleum distributor

- Type: Private
- Industry: Petroleum
- Founded: 1976
- Founder: Terry Lockwood; Keith Mitchell; Mark Quackenbush
- Headquarters: Perth, Western Australia
- Area served: Australia
- Parent: Chevron Corporation
- Website: www.pumaenergy.com.au/about-puma-energy/our-brands/

Gull Petroleum is a petroleum distributor in Australia. Founded in Perth, Western Australia in 1976, it was later owned by Puma Energy and now owned by Chevron Corporation (Caltex).

== History ==
Gull Petroleum was founded by Keith Mitchell, Mark Quackenbush, and Terry Lockwood in 1976.

Mitchell and Lockwood first met each other while working at Golden Fleece. While at Golden Fleece Mitchell made a big impression in the Western Australian oil and gas industry rapidly climbing the Golden Fleece corporate ladder. This led to Mitchell being headhunted by Quackenbush's father, the owner of Western Oil. When Mitchell joined Western Oil, Lockwood followed across with him. It was at this time the three men came together and founded Gull Petroleum.

Keith Mitchell came up with the idea to name the company Gull, due to the familiar sounding name of Gulf Oil. The strategic naming of Gull helped to bring familiarity and trust in the Western Australian oil and gas market place.

It was during the early expansion of Gull when the team were looking to take over Gingers Roadhouse that they met the real estate agent Fred Rae. Rae was so impressed with Gull Petroleum's expansion and its future plans that he asked to buy into the company in 1978.

Soon after Rae joined Gull, due to the death of his father Quackenbush left to take over his father's company Western Oil.

In 1984 Mitchell sold his shareholding to Rae. In December 1995 Gull Petroleum expanded into the Australian Capital Territory.

In 1998 Gull New Zealand was established. In December 2010, Rae sold the 98 Gull service station network in Western Australia to Archer Capital, which was then rolled into Archer's Ausfuel business, which also includes Choice Petroleum and Peak Petroleum. In March 2013, Ausfuel was acquired by Puma Energy. The sale included 110 Gull, Choice and Peak service stations and 11 depots. Puma Energy in Australia was acquired by Chevron Corporation (Caltex) in 2020.

While Puma sites nationwide had been rebranded as Caltex, there are still a few Gull sites in Western Australia as of April 2025. An example is the Gull site in the town of Waterloo east of Bunbury.

== See also ==
- List of automotive fuel retailers
- List of convenience stores
