= Waiotahe =

Rural settlement in the Bay of Plenty Region, New Zealand

- Rural settlement
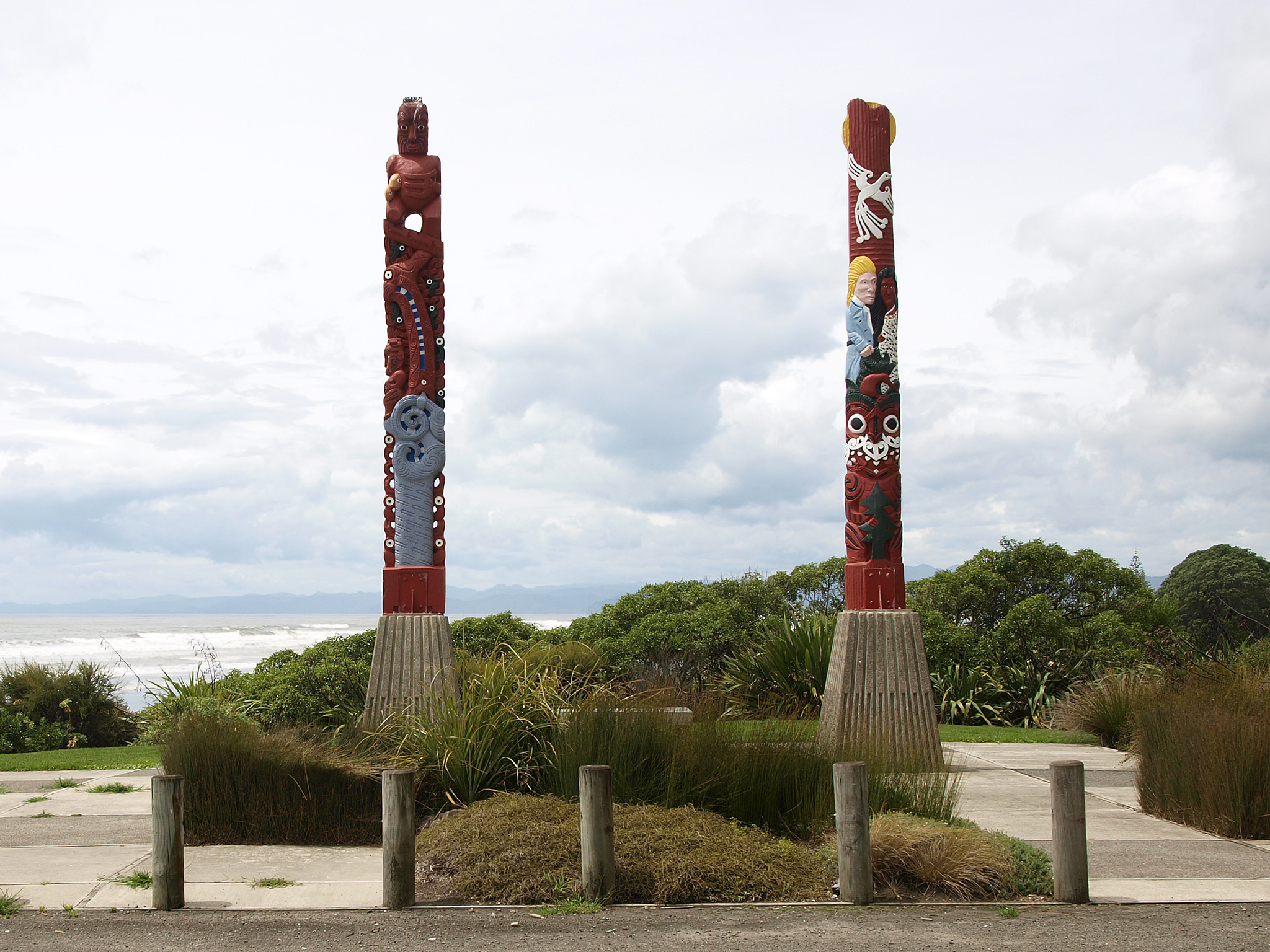
- Te Ara Ki Te Rawhiti - The pathway to the sunrise
- Interactive map of Waiotahe
- Coordinates: 37.993°S 177.241°E
- Country: New Zealand
- Region: Bay of Plenty
- Territorial authority: Ōpōtiki District
- Ward: Waioeka-Waiōtahe-Otara Ward
- Electorates: East Cape; Waiariki (Māori)

Government
  - Territorial authority: Ōpōtiki District Council
  - Regional council: Bay of Plenty Regional Council
  - Mayor of Ōpōtiki: David Moore
  - East Cape MP: Dana Kirkpatrick
  - Waiariki MP: Rawiri Waititi

Area
  - Total: 0.94 km^{2} (0.36 sq mi)

Population (June 2025)
  - Total: 260
  - Density: 280/km^{2} (720/sq mi)
- Postcode(s): 3198

Waiotahe (formerly written Waiotahi) is a beach, settlement and rural community in the Ōpōtiki District and Bay of Plenty Region of New Zealand's North Island, near the mouth and lowermost stretch of the Waiotahe River.

It includes a beach that attracts swimmers, surfers and anglers during the summer months, and river mouths that people fish from year-round. The beach is more dangerous during low tide due to stronger rips, but has natural hazards in all conditions.

Ōpōtiki District Council has banned vehicles from the mudflats of the Waiotahe estuary and a section of Waiotahe Beach. The council allows vehicles at other beaches, unlike most other New Zealand councils.

== Etymology ==
In August 2015 the official name of the town was changed from Waiotahi to Waiotahe following a proposal by the New Zealand Geographic Board. Several eponymous features had the same spelling alteration.

== History ==
In July 2013, a couple in their 60s were attacked and held captive in their Waiotahe home by a former soldier who had spent the previous night sleeping rough near the town hall. The perpetrator fled the scene in their ute and was shot dead by police in Auckland. The couple were hospitalised for injuries to their hands and reported being traumatised by their ordeal.

The first case of Mycoplasma bovis in the Bay of Plenty was recorded in a farm in Waiotahe in January 2020.

== Demographics ==
Stats NZ describes Waiotahe as a rural settlement, which covers 0.94 km^{2} (0.36 sq mi). It had an estimated population of 260 as of June 2025, with a population density of 277 people per km^{2}. The settlement is part of the Waiotahe statistical area.

Historical population for Waiotahe settlement
Year	Pop.	±% p.a.
2006	156	—
2013	159	+0.27%
2018	246	+9.12%
2023	228	−1.51%
The 2006 population is for a larger area of 7.90 km^{2}. Source:

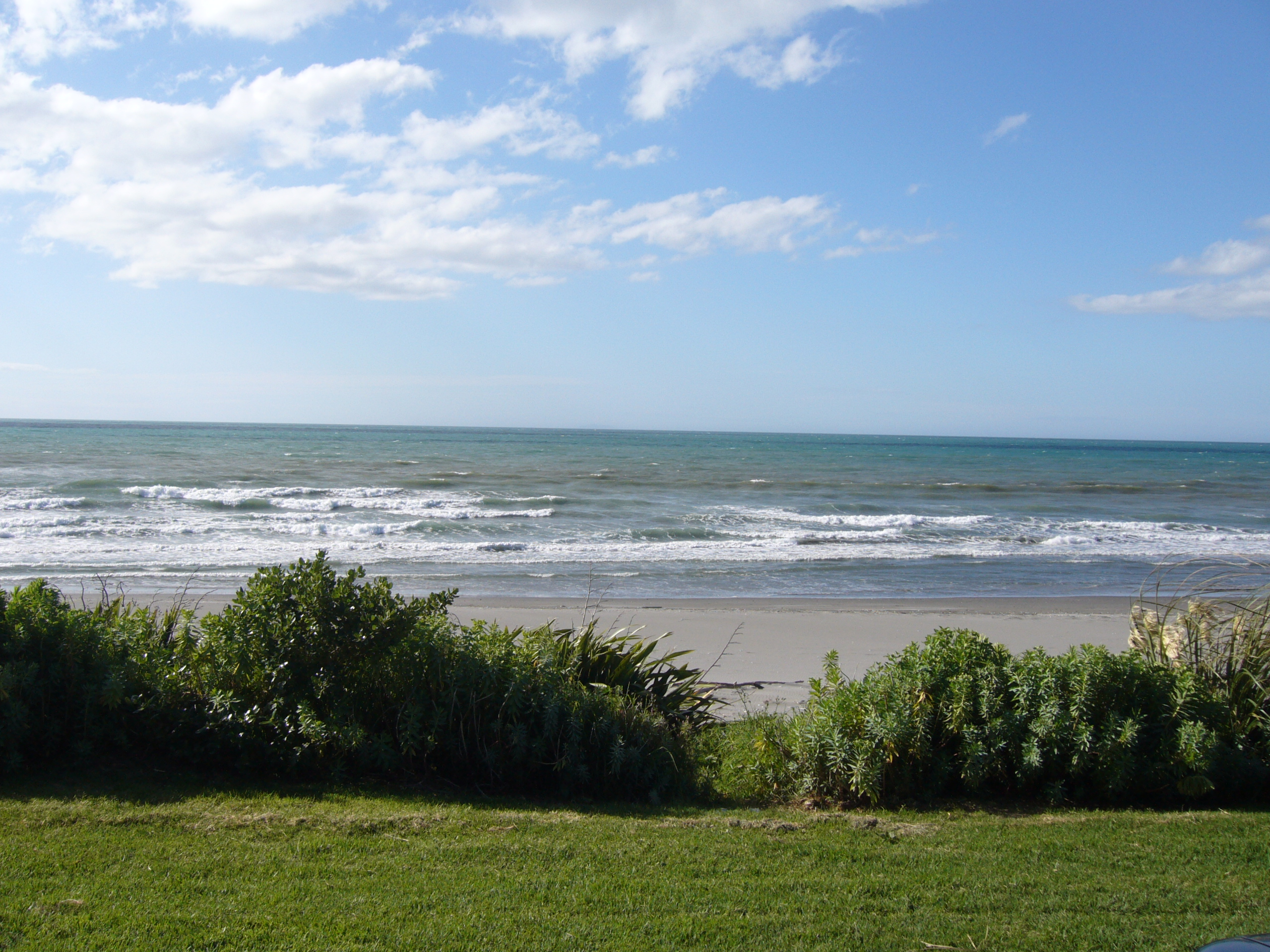
Waiotahe Beach

Waiotahe settlement had a population of 228 in the 2023 New Zealand census, a decrease of 18 people (−7.3%) since the 2018 census, and an increase of 69 people (43.4%) since the 2013 census. There were 111 males and 114 females in 105 dwellings. 1.3% of people identified as LGBTIQ+. The median age was 57.6 years (compared with 38.1 years nationally). There were 27 people (11.8%) aged under 15 years, 18 (7.9%) aged 15 to 29, 114 (50.0%) aged 30 to 64, and 66 (28.9%) aged 65 or older.

People could identify as more than one ethnicity. The results were 76.3% European (Pākehā), 35.5% Māori, 3.9% Pasifika, 3.9% Asian, and 2.6% other, which includes people giving their ethnicity as "New Zealander". English was spoken by 97.4%, Māori by 10.5%, Samoan by 1.3%, and other languages by 3.9%. No language could be spoken by 1.3% (e.g. too young to talk). The percentage of people born overseas was 13.2, compared with 28.8% nationally.

Religious affiliations were 30.3% Christian, 3.9% Māori religious beliefs, 1.3% Buddhist, and 1.3% other religions. People who answered that they had no religion were 53.9%, and 9.2% of people did not answer the census question.

Of those at least 15 years old, 39 (19.4%) people had a bachelor's or higher degree, 126 (62.7%) had a post-high school certificate or diploma, and 39 (19.4%) people exclusively held high school qualifications. The median income was $37,700, compared with $41,500 nationally. 24 people (11.9%) earned over $100,000 compared to 12.1% nationally. The employment status of those at least 15 was 84 (41.8%) full-time, 27 (13.4%) part-time, and 3 (1.5%) unemployed.

=== Waiotahe statistical area ===
Waiotahe statistical area, which also includes Ōhiwa, covers 143.25 km^{2} (55.31 sq mi) and had an estimated population of 1,650 as of June 2025, with a population density of 12 people per km^{2}.

Historical population for Waiotahe statistical area
Year	Pop.	±% p.a.
2006	1,368	—
2013	1,368	+0.00%
2018	1,530	+2.26%
2023	1,602	+0.92%
The 2006 population is for a smaller area of 141.78 km^{2}. Source:

Waiotahe had a population of 1,602 in the 2023 New Zealand census, an increase of 72 people (4.7%) since the 2018 census, and an increase of 234 people (17.1%) since the 2013 census. There were 828 males, 771 females, and 6 people of other genders in 708 dwellings. 1.7% of people identified as LGBTIQ+. The median age was 52.2 years (compared with 38.1 years nationally). There were 252 people (15.7%) aged under 15 years, 204 (12.7%) aged 15 to 29, 723 (45.1%) aged 30 to 64, and 423 (26.4%) aged 65 or older.

People could identify as more than one ethnicity. The results were 71.2% European (Pākehā); 41.6% Māori; 2.6% Pasifika; 3.2% Asian; 0.4% Middle Eastern, Latin American and African New Zealanders (MELAA); and 2.8% other, which includes people giving their ethnicity as "New Zealander". English was spoken by 97.9%, Māori by 11.6%, Samoan by 0.2%, and other languages by 4.5%. No language could be spoken by 1.3% (e.g. too young to talk). New Zealand Sign Language was known by 0.9%. The percentage of people born overseas was 11.2, compared with 28.8% nationally.

Religious affiliations were 28.5% Christian, 0.4% Hindu, 5.6% Māori religious beliefs, 0.9% Buddhist, and 1.9% other religions. People who answered that they had no religion were 56.9%, and 7.1% of people did not answer the census question.

Of those at least 15 years old, 228 (16.9%) people had a bachelor's or higher degree, 786 (58.2%) had a post-high school certificate or diploma, and 339 (25.1%) people exclusively held high school qualifications. The median income was $36,000, compared with $41,500 nationally. 111 people (8.2%) earned over $100,000 compared to 12.1% nationally. The employment status of those at least 15 was 609 (45.1%) full-time, 189 (14.0%) part-time, and 51 (3.8%) unemployed.

== Education ==
Waiotahe Valley School is a co-educational state primary school for Year 1 to 8 students, with a roll of 107 as of July 2026. The school opened in 1921.

== Notable people ==
Kayaker Lisa Carrington was raised in the valley and went to the local school, where both of her parents are teachers. She regularly visits the area.
