= Ocean power in New Zealand =

New Zealand has large ocean energy resources but does not yet generate any power from them. TVNZ reported in 2007 that over 20 wave and tidal power projects are currently under development. However, not a lot of public information is available about these projects. The Aotearoa Wave and Tidal Energy Association was established in 2006 to "promote the uptake of marine energy in New Zealand". According to their 10 February 2008 newsletter, they have 59 members. However, the association doesn't list its members.

From 2008 to 2011, the government Energy Efficiency and Conservation Authority is allocating $2 million each year from a Marine Energy Deployment Fund, set up to encourage the utilisation of this resource.

The greater Cook Strait and Kaipara Harbour seem to offer the most promising sites for using underwater turbines. Two resource consents have been granted for pilot projects in Cook Strait itself and in the Tory Channel, and consent is being sought for a project sites at the entrance to the Kaipara. Other potential locations include the Manukau and Hokianga Harbours, and French Pass. The harbours produce currents up to 6 knots with tidal flows up to 100,000 cubic metres a second. These tidal volumes are 12 times greater than the flows in the largest New Zealand rivers.

== Tidal power ==
Tidal power is generated by capturing some of the energy in the tides as they cycle forth and back, twice each day. Tidal devices can be weir or dam like structures (barrages), used to hold the tide back, or turbines anchored within the tidal stream.

By world standards, New Zealand's tides are, for the most part, moderate. The tide usually ranges between one and two metres. Tidal currents are usually around two kilometres per hour (one knot). Some exception are in and around Cook Strait, where tidal currents can be much stronger, and at the entrance to some harbours, particularly Kaipara Harbour. Headlands and constrictions like these focus the currents, giving energy levels reaching 750 W per square metre.

Tides are controlled mainly by the gravitational pull of the Moon. About once a day the Moon rotates around the Earth, attracting as it travels the bulge of water called the high tide that also travels around the Earth. There are actually two high tides, because the Earth and Moon, as a system, both rotate about a common centre of mass. This centre is two-thirds out from the centre of the Earth, not at the centre of the Earth. The effect of the Earth spinning about this centre is that it behaves as a centrifuge, resulting in a second high tide bulge in the ocean most distant from the Moon.

A second influence on the tides occurs because of gravitation from the Sun. Gravitation from the Sun has less influence than the Moon, because it is so much further from Earth. However, the Sun influences the tidal range. When the Sun, Earth and Moon are aligned in a straight line (at new and full moon), their tidal effects combine, producing the particularly high and low tides called spring tides. When the Sun is at right angles to the Moon, the effects are partially cancelled, producing the small tides called neap tides.

New Zealand has a relatively small tidal range, usually less than two metres. However, some of the larger harbours on the west coast of the North Island, in particular the Kaipara, experience significant currents as the tides rise and fall.

In harmonic tidal analysis, tides are represented as the sum of many periodic components. 62 tidal constituents are typically large enough to be considered for use in predicting marine tides, though only a subset are required for practical accuracy at a given location. The gravitation of the Moon and Sun are the most important.

Global surface elevation of the M2 ocean tide (NASA) This computer animation shows the peaks and troughs of the M2 tides sweeping anticlockwise around New Zealand. When it is high tide on one side of Cook Strait it is low tide on the other side. For this reason, Cook Strait can experience exceptionally fast tidal flows.

A third influence occurs because the Moon orbits at an angle to the equator. This means that if one of the bulges travelling around the Earth is above the equator, then the other bulge is below the equator. It also follows that some places will have one daily diurnal tide, while other places will have semi-diurnal tides twice a day. For example, there is a diurnal tide in the Ross Sea near Antarctica every 24.84 hours. The height of this tide dwindles to almost zero in a cycle which takes 13.66 days. New Zealand's tides are semi-diurnal. The primary cause, the lunar tide, is labelled the M2. The M stands for the Moon and the 2 stands for twice a day.

A fourth influence occurs because the orbit of the Moon around the Earth and the orbit of the Earth around the Sun are elliptical rather than circular. The effect of this is that the time between high tides changes a little from day to day. The Moon takes about 24.8 hours to orbit around the Earth, so it takes half this time, 12.4 hours, for the M2 tides to occur. The tides can be predicted far in advance, because the Moon and Earth have orbits that are predictable. The National Institute of Water and Atmospheric Research (NIWA) run a tidal computer model specific to New Zealand.

The actual tide pattern and timing is determined by the nature of the resonances in each ocean basin with the various frequencies of the gravitational influences, over many cycles. New Zealand's situation (like Iceland's) is a small island in a large basin, and the peaks and troughs of the M2 tides sweep continuously anticlockwise around New Zealand. When it is high tide on the west coast, it is low tide on the east coast, and vice versa: the straightforward notion of tidal bulges aligned with the Moon is insufficient. These currents are most noticeable in straits such as Cook Strait and in Foveaux Strait. A notable example is French Pass, just off the greater Cook Strait, where, despite the low tidal range, tidal streams can reach nearly eight knots.

=== Manapouri ===
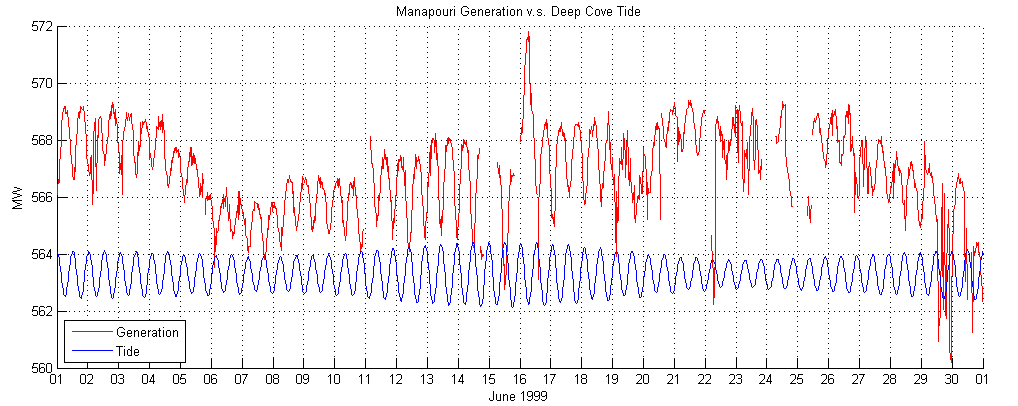
Generation and tide height

Since the construction of the Manapouri power station, there has been about five MW of tide-determined generation. The tailrace tunnel exit by Dusky Sound debouches at sea level, and thus the effective head of the power station is affected by the level of the tide there. If the turbines are operated at a fixed flow aperture, the power produced is not constant but follows the tide, an effect that can be seen in the following graph. Note that the timing follows the tides around the clock, not the usual twenty-four cycle of electricity usage.

The Opunake power station has its tailrace exiting to the beach but its operation is intermittent so if there is any tidal effect on generation there, it is unclear.

=== Cook Strait ===
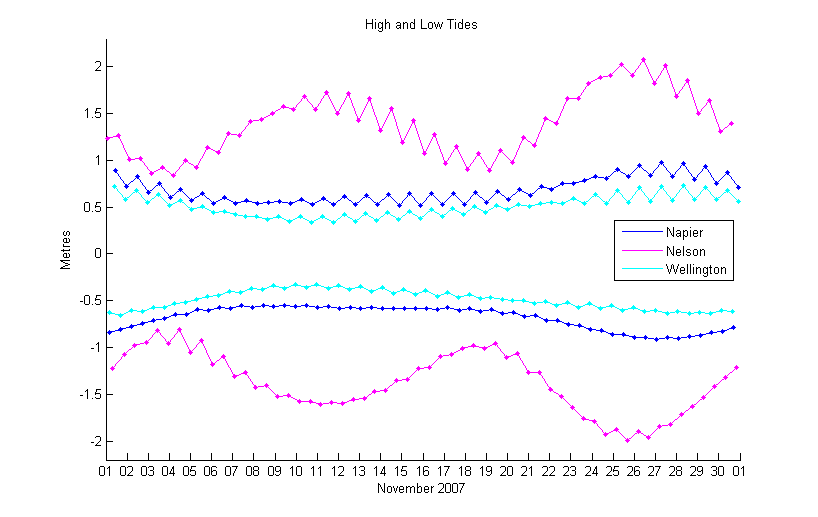
Tidal patterns in Cook Strait. The south part (Nelson) has two spring tides per month, versus only one on the north side (Wellington and Napier).

External images
- Cook Strait currents before and after high tide at Wellington – Te Ara: The Encyclopedia of New Zealand
- Underwater topography of Cook Strait – NIWA

Cook Strait has tidal flows amongst the strongest in the world, even though it has a smaller tidal range than most places in New Zealand. This is because the main M2 lunar tide component which circulates anti-clockwise around New Zealand is out of phase at each end of the strait. On the Pacific Ocean side the high tide occurs five hours before it occurs at the Tasman Sea side. On one side is high tide and on the other is low tide. The difference in sea level can drive tidal currents up to 2.5 metres per second (5 knots) across Cook Strait as well as into the Tory Channel. An unusual complication is that although there are two spring tides a month on the south side, the north side has only one spring tide a month, as shown in the plot. A further consequence of these opposed tides is that there is almost zero tidal height change at the centre of the strait. Although the tidal surge should flow in one direction for six hours and then the reverse direction for six hours, a particular surge might last eight or ten hours with the reverse surge enfeebled. In especially boisterous weather conditions the reverse surge can be negated, and the flow can remain in the same direction through three surge periods and longer. This is indicated on marine charts for the region.

There are numerous computer model representations of the tidal flow through Cook Strait. While the tidal components are readily realisable, the residual flow is more difficult to model.

In April 2008, a resource consent was granted to Neptune Power for the installation of an experimental underwater tidal stream turbine in the strait. The turbine has been designed in Britain and will be built in New Zealand at a cost $10 million. Fourteen metres in diameter and constructed of carbon fibre, it will be capable of producing one megawatt. It will be placed in eighty metres of water, 4.5 kilometres due south of Sinclair Head, in waters known as the “Karori rip”. Power from the turbine will be brought ashore at Vector's Island Bay substation. The turbine is a pilot, and will be sited in slower tides for testing. Neptune hopes to generate power from the unit by 2010. The company has claimed there is enough tidal movement in Cook Strait to generate 12 GW of power, more than one-and-a-half times New Zealand's current requirements. In practice, only some of this energy could be harnessed.

On the other side of the strait, Energy Pacifica has talked for some time about applying for resource consent to install up to ten marine turbines, each able to produce up to 1.2 MW, near the Cook Strait entrance to Tory Channel. They claim Tory Channel has tidal flows of 3.6 metres per second with good bathymetry and access to the electricity network. No application had been lodged by March 2011.

The power generated by tidal marine turbines varies as the cube of the tidal speed. Because the tidal speed doubles, eight times more tidal power can be produced at spring tides than at neap tides.

=== Kaipara Harbour ===
External images
- Kaipara Harbour main channel
- Proposed cable and turbines

The entrance to Kaipara Harbour, one of the largest harbours in the world, is a channel to the Tasman Sea. It narrows to a width of 6 kilometres (3.7 mi), and is over 50 metres (160 ft) deep in parts. On average, Kaipara tides rise and fall 2.10 metres (6.9 ft). At high tide, nearly 1000 square kilometres are flooded. Spring tidal flows reach 9 km/h (5 knots) in the entrance channel and move 1,990 million cubic metres per tidal movement or 7,960 million cubic meters daily.

In 2011, Crest Energy, a power company, received resource consent to install about 200 underwater tidal turbines for the Kaipara Tidal Power Station, which would use the substantial tidal flows moving in and out every day near the harbour mouth to produce electricity for approximately 250,000 homes.

Crest plans to place the turbines at least 30 metres deep along a ten kilometre stretch of the main channel. Historical charts show this stretch of the channel has changed little over 150 years. The output of the turbines will cycle twice daily with the predictable rise and fall of the tide. Each turbine will have a maximum output of 1.2 MW, and is expected to generate 0.75 MW averaged over time.

The peak level of generation for the combined turbines is about 200 MW. This exceeds the projected peak electricity needs of Northland. It would have environmental benefits in offsetting annual carbon emissions from a thermal-based, gas turbine generator of 575,000 tonnes of carbon. The project is costed at about $600 million and to be economic would have to be scaled up rapidly to near full capacity.

However, while the Department of Conservation has approved the project, and has made substantial environmental monitoring conditions part of the consent, the project also has objectors on the grounds of claimed influences on the local ecosystems and charter fishing. Appeals before the Environment Court were concluded in 2010, with a favourable decision released in February 2011.

== Wave power ==
Wave power involves converting the energy in ocean surface waves into electricity using devices either fixed to the shore, the seabed or floating out at sea. Wave energy varies with time, depending on when and where the winds and storms that drive the waves occur. Tidal energy is more regular and predictable.

Two wind zones affect New Zealand. South-east trade winds dominate in the north, enlivened by an occasional cyclone from the tropics. The rest of the country is dominated by the roaring forties, a broad band of westerly winds that span the middle latitudes of the southern hemisphere. The roaring forties extend over most of the southern part of the Tasman Sea and the Southern Ocean. These winds produce some of the stormiest seas in the world, with maximum wave heights regularly exceeding 4 metres.

External image
- Average wave height around New Zealand

On average, ocean waves in New Zealand deliver about 25 kW to each metre of coastline. The west and south-west coasts have the country's most energetic waves. Even on windless days, swells that were generated in the Southern Ocean still arrive. Less wave energy arrives at the north-east coast, because it is sheltered from the south-west waves (click the link on the right for a diagram). The amount of energy in a wave is proportional to the square of its height, so a two-metre wave contains four times the energy of a one-metre wave.

Wave Energy Technology - New Zealand (WET-NZ) is a Government-funded research and development collaboration programme between Industrial Research Limited, a Crown Research Institute, and Power Projects Limited, a privately owned Wellington-based company. The programme seeks to develop a wave energy device that generates electricity from both the kinetic and potential energy available in open ocean waves. In 2010 WET-NZ received resource consent for half-scale prototype testing at two test sites. The device is now called Azura and is being tested in Hawaii.

== Timeline ==
- 1966: The world's first tidal barrage project goes online at La Rance, France, with a capacity of 240 MW.
- 2003: Seaflow, the world's first underwater turbine prototype, goes on stream off north Devon with a peak capacity of 300 KW.
- 2008: The world's first commercial wave farm goes on line in Portugal. It uses Pelamis devices and has a peak capacity of 2.25 MW.
- 2008: SeaGen, the world's first commercial scale tidal stream energy generator, goes on stream in Strangford Lough, Northern Ireland with a peak capacity of 1.2 MW.
- 2008: Crest Energy Kaipara Limited applies for resource consent to sink 200 marine turbines near the entrance of Kaipara Harbour, with a peak capacity of 200MW.
- 2008: Neptune Power given resource consent to build a pilot turbine off Sinclair Head in Cook Strait.
- 2008: Energy Pacifica applies for resource consent to install up to 10 marine turbines, each able to produce up to 1.2 MW, near the Cook Strait entrance to Tory Channel.

== See also ==
- Capacity factor
- Intermittent power source
- Marine current power
- Ocean thermal energy conversion
- Pelamis Wave Energy Converter
- Renewable energy in New Zealand
- Salinity gradient power
- Tidal power
- Wave farm
- Wave power
- Wind wave
- Wind power in New Zealand
- Renewable energy in New Zealand
