= List of power stations in New Zealand =

Location of major power stations (100 MW or over) in New Zealand

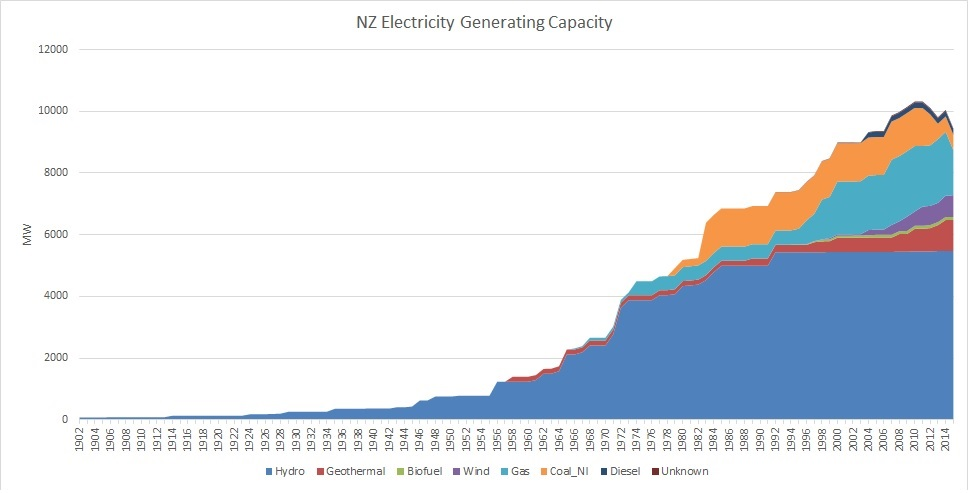
Graph of New Zealand electricity generation capacity by year

This is a list of power stations in New Zealand.

The list is not exhaustive – only power stations 1 MW and over, and notable power stations below 1 MW, are listed.

Power plants in New Zealand have different generating roles – for baseload, intermediate or peaking. Baseload generators are those that run continuously (except for maintenance), and include all geothermal and run-of-the-river hydroelectric plants, which must 'use it or lose it'. Intermediate generators are load-following power plants. Peaking power plants generate only for minutes or hours at a time, during the sharpest peaks in electricity demand. Nuclear power is not used in New Zealand.

== Bioenergy ==
Name	Territorial authority	Coordinates	Type	Capacity (MW)	Commissioned	Operator
Greenmount Landfill	Auckland (Howick)	36°56′12″S 174°53′45″E	Biogas	5.5	1992	Envirowaste / Mighty River Power
Kinleith	South Waikato	38°16′24″S 175°52′50″E	Wood cogeneration	40	1997	Oji Fibre Solutions
Omarunui	Hastings	39°32′48″S 176°46′57″E	Biogas	1	2014	LMS Energy / Hastings District Council
Pan Pac	Hastings	39°22′41″S 176°53′19″E	Wood cogeneration	12.8	2005	Pan Pac Forest Products
Rosedale	Auckland (Upper Harbour)	36°44′50″S 174°42′58″E	Biogas	2.8	1992	Mercury Energy
Silverstream Landfill	Lower Hutt	41°09′37″S 174°59′49″E	Biogas	2.7	1994	LMS Energy
Southern Landfill	Wellington	41°19′42″S 174°44′40″E	Biogas	1.1	2022	LMS Energy
Tirohia	Hauraki	37°26′11″S 175°39′21″E	Biogas	2.0	2008	Mercury Energy
Redvale Landfill and Energy Park	Auckland (Upper Harbour)	36°39′51″S 174°37′44″E	Biogas	12	1993	Waste Management
Waipa Mill (Red Stag Timber)	Rotorua	38°10′57″S 176°16′14″E	Wood cogeneration	10	2018	Red Stag Timber
Kate Valley Landfill	Hurunui	43°05′59″S 172°50′11″E	Biogas	4.3	2014	Transwaste

== Geothermal ==
Name	Territorial authority	Coordinates	Type	Capacity (MW)	Commissioned	Operator
Te Ahi O Maui	Kawerau	38°03′47″S 176°42′10″E	Binary	24	2018	Eastland Generation
Geothermal Development Limited	Kawerau	38°03′38″S 176°43′21″E	Binary	8	2008	Eastland Generation
Kawerau TG1 & TG2	Kawerau		Binary	6	1989, 1993	Nova Energy
Kawerau TOPP1	Kawerau	38°03′55″S 176°43′15″E	Binary	26	2012	Eastland Generation
Kawerau TOPP2	Kawerau	38°04′29″S 176°41′59″E	Binary	49	2025	Eastland Generation
Kawerau	Kawerau	38°03′47″S 176°43′38″E	Flash steam	105	2008	Mercury Energy
Mokai	Taupō	38°31′52″S 175°55′39″E	Binary	112	2000	Mercury Energy
Nga Awa Purua	Taupō	38°36′50″S 176°11′02″E	Flash steam	149	2010	Mercury Energy
Ngatamariki	Taupō	38.54709°S 176.19497°E	Binary	132	2013 (Unit 5 added 2026)	Mercury Energy
Ngāwhā	Far North	35°25′03″S 173°51′07″E	Binary	57	OEC 1&2 1998 OEC 3 OEC 4 Aug 2020	Top Energy
Ohaaki	Taupō	38°31′37″S 176°17′31″E	Flash steam	44	1989	Contact Energy
Poihipi	Taupō	38°37′49″S 176°2′30″E	Flash steam	40	1997	Contact Energy
Rotokawa	Taupō	38°36′45″S 176°11′37″E	Binary	28	1997	Mercury Energy
Tauhara	Taupō	38.66676°S 176.15780°E	Flash steam	174	2024	Contact Energy
Te Huka	Taupō	38°40′1″S 176°7′5″E	Binary	79	2010 (Unit 3) 2024	Contact Energy
Te Mihi	Taupō	38.619113°S 176.047476°E	Flash steam	166	2014	Contact Energy
Wairakei A & B	Taupō	38°37′37″S 176°06′19″E	Flash steam & binary	132	1958 (Binary added 2005)	Contact Energy

== Hydroelectric ==
Name	Territorial authority	Scheme	Coordinates	Capacity (MW)	Commissioned	Operator
Amethyst	Westland			7.6	2013	Westpower
Aniwhenua	Whakatane		38°17′37.3″S 176°47′32.5″E	25	1980	Pioneer Energy
Arapuni	South Waikato	Waikato River	38°04′17″S 175°38′36″E	196.7	1929, 1946	Mercury Energy
Aratiatia	Taupō	Waikato River	38°36′57″S 176°8′33″E	78	1964	Mercury Energy
Argyle	Marlborough	Branch River	41°40′15″S 173°12′12″E	3.8	1983	Manawa Energy
Arnold	Grey		42°31′45″S 171°24′41″E	3.0	1932	Manawa Energy
Atiamuri	South Waikato / Taupō	Waikato River	38°23′35″S 176°1′24″E	84	1962	Mercury Energy
Aviemore	Waitaki	Lower Waitaki	44°39′21″S 170°21′18″E	220	1968	Meridian Energy
Benmore	Waitaki	Lower Waitaki	44°33′51″S 170°11′50″E	540	1965	Meridian Energy
Cleardale	Ashburton		43°27′08.8″S 171°35′03.8″E	1.1	2010	Re-Generate NZ
Clyde	Central Otago	Clutha River	45°10′46″S 169°18′25″E	432	1992	Contact Energy
Cobb	Tasman		41°06′13″S 172°41′16″E	34.3	1956	Manawa Energy
Coleridge	Selwyn		43°21′51″S 171°31′37″E	45	1914	Manawa Energy
Deep Stream	Clutha	Waipori		5	2008	Manawa Energy
Dillmans	Westland	Kumara		3.5	1928	Manawa Energy
Duffers	Westland	Kumara		0.5	1928	Manawa Energy
Ellis	Central Otago	Teviot Scheme		7.8	1981	Pioneer Energy
Falls	Central Otago	Manuherikia River		1.3	2003	Pioneer Energy
Flaxy	Whakatane	Wheao and Flaxy		2.1	1982	Manawa Energy
Fraser (Lower)	Central Otago	Fraser Power Scheme		2.8	1956	Pioneer Energy
Fraser (Upper)	Central Otago	Fraser Power Scheme		8	2019	Pioneer Energy
George	Central Otago	Teviot Scheme		1	1924 (refurbished 2002)	Pioneer Energy
Highbank	Ashburton	Rangitata Diversion Race	43°34′24″S 171°44′08″E	25.2	1945	Manawa Energy
Hinemaiaia A	Taupō	Hinemaiaia	38°53′24″S 176°05′27″E	2.0	1952	Manawa Energy
Hinemaiaia B	Taupō	Hinemaiaia		1.3	1966	Manawa Energy
Hinemaiaia C	Taupō	Hinemaiaia		2.8	1982	Manawa Energy
Horseshoe Bend	Central Otago	Teviot Scheme		4.3	1999	Pioneer Energy
Kaimai 5	Western Bay of Plenty	Kaimai		0.35	1994	Manawa Energy
Kaitawa	Wairoa	Waikaremoana	38°48′12″S 177°07′52″E	36	1948	Genesis Energy
Kaniere Forks	Westland	Lake Kaniere		0.43	1911	Manawa Energy
Karapiro	Waipa	Waikato River	37°55′26″S 175°32′21″E	90	1948	Mercury Energy
Kourarau	Carterton		41°04′1.2″S 175°40′58.5″E	1.0	1923, 1925	Trust House
Kowhai	Central Otago	Teviot Scheme		1.9	2010	Pioneer Energy
Kuratau	Taupō		38°52′46.1″S 175°44′8.1″E	6	1962	King Country Energy
Kumara	Westland	Kumara		6.5	1928	Manawa Energy
Lloyd Mandeno	Western Bay of Plenty	Kaimai		15.6	1972	Manawa Energy
Lower Mangapapa	Western Bay of Plenty	Kaimai		6.0	1979	Manawa Energy
Manapouri	Southland		45°31′17″S 167°16′40″E	850	1971	Meridian Energy
Mangahao	Horowhenua		40°34′36″S 175°27′1″E	42	1924	Todd Energy
Mangorei	New Plymouth		39°06′18.5″S 174°07′07.7″E	4.5	1906, 1931	Manawa Energy
Maraetai I	South Waikato / Taupō	Waikato River	38°21′09″S 175°44′38″E	252	1954	Mercury Energy
Maraetai II	South Waikato / Taupō	Waikato River		108	1971	Mercury Energy
Maraetai (mini)	South Waikato / Taupō			0.1		Mercury
Matahina	Whakatane		38°06′54″S 176°48′52″E	80	1967	Manawa Energy
Matiri	Buller		41°39′43″S 172°20′4″E	5	2020	Pioneer Energy
McKays Creek	Westland	Lake Kaniere		1.1	1931	Manawa Energy
Michelle	Central Otago	Teviot Scheme		1.6	1982	Pioneer Energy
Monowai	Southland		45°46′32.5″S 167°36′59.7″E	6.6	1926	Pioneer Energy
Montalto	Ashburton	Rangitata Diversion		1.8	1982	Manawa Energy
Motukawa	New Plymouth			4.5	1927-1938	Manawa Energy
Ohakuri	South Waikato / Taupō	Waikato River	38°24′30″S 176°5′22″E	112	1962	Mercury Energy
Ōhau A	Mackenzie	Upper Waitaki	44°15′52″S 170°1′56″E	264	1980	Meridian Energy
Ōhau B	Waitaki	Upper Waitaki	44°17′58″S 170°6′44″E	212	1984	Meridian Energy
Ōhau C	Waitaki	Upper Waitaki	44°20′31″S 170°10′56″E	212	1985	Meridian Energy
Omanawa Falls	Bay of Plenty		37°50′46.6″S 176°05′21.3″E	0.3	1915, extended 1921	Omanawa Falls Hydro Limited
Onekaka	Tasman		40°46′56″S 172°41′15″E	0.94	2003	Onekaka Energy
Opuha	Mackenzie			7.5	1999	Opuha Water / Manawa Energy
Paerau	Central Otago	Strath Taieri		10	1984	Manawa Energy
Patea	South Taranaki		39°32′46″S 174°34′13″E	32	1984	Manawa Energy
Patearoa	Central Otago	Strath Taieri		2.3	1984	Manawa Energy
Piriaka	Ruapehu		38°54′42″S 175°20′34″E	1.3	1924	King Country Energy
Piripaua	Wairoa	Waikaremoana	38°50′21″S 177°10′05″E	42	1943	Genesis Energy
Pupu	Tasman			0.3	1929	Pupu Hydro Society
Rangipo	Taupō	Tongariro	39°09′12″S 175°50′12″E	120	1983	Genesis Energy
Rimu	Hastings	Esk		2.4	2013	Manawa Energy
Roaring Meg lower	Central Otago / Queentown Lakes	Roaring Meg		3.0	1936	Pioneer Energy
Roaring Meg upper	Central Otago / Queentown Lakes	Roaring Meg		1.3	1936	Pioneer Energy
Roxburgh	Central Otago	Clutha River	45°28′33″S 169°19′21″E	320	1956	Contact
Ruahihi	Western Bay of Plenty	Kaimai		20	1981	Manawa Energy
Tekapo A	Mackenzie	Upper Waitaki	44°00′50″S 170°27′38″E	25	1951	Genesis Energy
Tekapo B	Mackenzie	Upper Waitaki	44°07′21″S 170°12′43″E	160	1977	Genesis Energy
Tokaanu	Taupō	Tongariro	38°58′52″S 175°46′06″E	240	1973	Genesis Energy
Toronui	Hastings	Esk		1.4	2013	Manawa Energy
Tuai	Wairoa	Waikaremoana	38°48′25″S 177°09′03″E	60	1929	Genesis Energy
Wahapo/Ōkārito Forks	Westland			3.1	1960	Manawa Energy
Waihi Hydro	Waihi			5.0	1986	Eastland Generation
Waihopai	Marlborough		39°09′12″S 175°50′12″E	2.5	1927	Manawa Energy
Waipapa	South Waikato	Waikato River	38°17′32″S 175°41′01″E	51	1961	Mercury Energy
Waipori 1A	Clutha	Waipori		10	1907	Manawa Energy
Waipori 2A	Clutha	Waipori		58		Manawa Energy
Waipori 3	Clutha	Waipori		7.6		Manawa Energy
Waipori 4	Clutha	Waipori		8		Manawa Energy
Wairere	Waikato		38°31′54″S 175°00′30″E	4.6	1925	King Country Energy
Wairua	Whangarei		35°45′27″S 174°04′03″E	5.0	1916	Northpower
Waitaki	Waitaki	Lower Waitaki	44°41′23″S 170°25′34″E	90	1935	Meridian Energy
Whakamaru	South Waikato / Taupō	Waikato River	38°25.178′S 175°48.493′E	124	1956	Mercury Energy
Mangapehi	Waikato			1.6	2008	Pioneer Energy
Marokopa	Waitomo area, Waikato			2.0		Clearwater Hydro
Matawai	Gisborne			2.0	2009	Pioneer Energy
Mokauiti	Central North Island			1.9	1925, 1938, 1963	King Country Energy
Normanby	Normanby, Taranaki			1.0	1903, 2015	Greenfern Industries
Onekaka	Tasman District			1.0		Onekaka Energy
Rochfort	Westport, West Coast			4.2	2013	Kawatiri Energy
Talla Burn	Central Otago			2.6	2010	Talla Burn Generation
Teviot Bridge	Roxburgh, Otago	Teviot Scheme		1.1	1972	Pioneer Energy
Waihi Station	near Wairoa, Hawke's Bay			4.7	1913	
Wheao	Whakatane	Wheao and Flaxy	38°38′00″S 176°34′41″E	24	1982	Manawa Energy

=== Decommissioned hydroelectric ===
Name	Location	Type	Capacity (MW)	Commissioned	Decommissioned	Last operator	Notes
Bullendale	Queenstown	2 Pelton wheels	0.04	1886	1907	Phoenix Mine	First industrial generation in NZ
Okere Falls	north-east of Rotorua		0.2	1901	1936	NZ Government	First power station owned by government. Dismantled in 1941.
One Mile Creek	Queenstown	1 Pelton wheel	0.06	1924	1966	Otago Central Electric Power Board	Decommissioned but restored as heritage exhibit in 2005
Horahora	east of Cambridge, Waikato		10.3	1913	1947	State Hydro Department	Drowned by formation of Lake Karapiro
Reefton	Reefton, West Coast		<1	1888	1949	Grey Electric Power Board	Demolished
Wye Creek	Otago-Southland		1.3	1936	2008	Pioneer Energy	Mothballed after turbine/generator failure
Havelock North	Maraetotara Valley		0.18 (250 hp)	1922	1941	Hawke’s Bay Electric Power Board	Dam used as popular swimming spot. Decommissioned due to lightning strike damage.

== Heritage hydroelectric ==
Name	Location	Type	Output	Commissioned	Operator	Purpose	Notes
Mokopeka	Maraetotara Valley, Hawke's Bay	Private	8KW at 110V DC	1891	John Chambers	Farming tools, heating and cooking for nearby homesteads	Believed to be the oldest hydro electric power station in the world that still operates. Currently maintained by volunteers. Was never connected to national grid.

== Fossil-fuel thermal ==
Name	Coordinates	Territorial authority	Type	Capacity (MW)	Commissioned	Closed/ decommissioning date	Operator
Auckland Hospital		Auckland (Waitemata)	Gas/diesel cogeneration	3.6	2005		Auckland DHB / Pioneer Energy
Bream Bay		Whangarei	Diesel recip engine	9	2011		Manawa Energy
Edgecumbe		Whakatane	Gas cogeneration	10	1996		Nova Energy
Evans Bay		Wellington	Coal steam turbine	23	1924	1968	Wellington MED
Glenbrook		Auckland (Franklin)	Coal/gas waste heat	112	1997		Alinta
Junction Road		Taranaki	Gas	100	2020		Nova Energy
Huntly 1,2, & 4	37°32′40″S 175°09′01″E	Waikato	Coal/gas steam turbine	750	1983		Genesis Energy
Huntly 3	37°32′40″S 175°09′01″E	Waikato	Coal/gas steam turbine	250	1983	2012	Genesis Energy
Huntly 5	37°32′35″S 175°08′57″E	Waikato	Gas combined-cycle	385	2007		Genesis Energy
Huntly 6	37°32′38″S 175°08′53″E	Waikato	Gas/diesel open-cycle	48	2004		Genesis Energy
Kapuni		South Taranaki	Gas combined-cycle cogeneration	25	1998		Vector / Bay of Plenty Energy
Kawerau (TPP)		Kawerau	Gas cogeneration	37	1966		Tasman Pulp and Paper
Kinleith		South Waikato	Wood/gas cogeneration	40	1998		Genesis Energy
Kings Wharf		Auckland (Waitemata)	Coal steam turbine	10.5	1913	1968	Auckland EPB
Mangahewa		New Plymouth	Gas	9.0	2008		Nova Energy
Marsden A		Whangarei	Oil	240	1967	1997	ECNZ
Marsden B		Whangarei	Oil	250	never commissioned		ECNZ
McKee (recip)		New Plymouth	Gas reciprocating	2.0	2008		Nova Energy
McKee (turbine)		New Plymouth	Gas open-cycle	100	2013		Todd Generation
Meremere		Waikato	Coal steam turbine	210	1958	1991	ECNZ
New Plymouth		New Plymouth	Gas/oil steam turbine	600	1974	2008	Contact Energy
Otahuhu A		Auckland (Otara-Papatoetoe)	Gas open cycle		1968	late 1990s	Contact Energy
Otahuhu B		Auckland (Otara-Papatoetoe)	Gas combined cycle	404	2000	2015	Contact Energy
Palmerston North		Palmerston North	Town gas/diesel reciprocating	2	1924	1992	Palmerston North MED
QE2 Park		Christchurch	Diesel recip engine	4	2011-2		Orion New Zealand
Southdown	36°55′39″S 174°49′38″E	Auckland (Maungakiekie-Tamaki)	Gas combined-cycle cogeneration	170	1997	2015	Mercury Energy
Springlands		Marlborough	Diesel reciprocating	1.5	1930	2003	Marlborough Lines
Stratford CC	39°19′56″S 174°19′8″E	Stratford	Gas combined-cycle	377	1998	2026	Contact Energy
Stratford peaker	39°19′56″S 174°19′8″E	Stratford	Gas open-cycle	200	2010		Contact Energy
Te Awamutu		Waipa	Gas turbine	54	1995	2007	Genesis Energy
Te Rapa	37°42′59″S 175°13′0″E	Hamilton	Gas cogeneration	44	1999	2023	Contact Energy
Wellington Hospital		Wellington	Gas/oil cogeneration	8	1981		Capital & Coast DHB / Vector / Meridian Energy
Whareroa		South Taranaki	Gas combined-cycle cogeneration	68	1996		Fonterra / Todd Energy
Whirinaki	39°22′59″S 176°53′16″E	Hastings	Diesel open-cycle	155	2004		Contact Energy

== Wind ==
Name	Territorial authority	Coordinates	Number of turbines	Capacity (MW)	Commissioned	Closed	Operator
Awhitu	Waikato	36°16′S 174°40′E	1	1	2020		Private developer
Flat Hill	near Bluff, Southland	46°35′S 168°17′E	8	6.8	2015		Pioneer Energy
Gebbies Pass	Christchurch	43°41′54″S 172°38′27″E	1	0.5	2003		Windflow Technology
Harapaki Wind Farm	Hawkes Bay	39°11′2″S 176°41′35″E	41	176	2024		Meridian Energy
Hau Nui	South Wairarapa	41°21′42″S 175°29′2″E	15	8.7	1996, 2004		Genesis Energy
Horseshoe Bend	Central Otago		3	2.3	2009		Pioneer Energy
Kaiwera Downs - Stage 1	south-east of Gore, Southland	46°14′29″S 169°3′21″E	10	43	2023		Mercury Energy
Lulworth	Marlborough		4	1.0	2011		Energy Marlborough
Mahinerangi	Dunedin	45°45′38″S 169°54′18″E	12	36	2011		Mercury Energy
Mill Creek	Wellington	41°12′44″S 174°44′20″E	26	60	2014		Meridian Energy
Mt Stuart	Clutha	46°04′20″S 169°46′2″E	9	7.7	December 2011		Pioneer Energy
Tararua	Palmerston North / Tararua	40°20′46″S 175°46′48″E	134	161	1999, 2004, 2007		Mercury Energy
Te Āpiti	Palmerston North / Tararua	40°17′46″S 175°48′30″E	55	91	2004		Meridian Energy
Te Rere Hau	Palmerston North / Tararua	40°23′18″S 175°43′27″E	97	48.5	2006, 2009, 2011		Meridian
Te Uku	Waikato	37°52′42″S 174°57′47″E	28	64.4	2011		Meridian Energy / WEL Networks
Turitea	Palmerston North / Turitea	40°40′28″S 175°40′17″E	60	222	2021 (stage 1) 2023 (stage 2)		Mercury Energy
Waipipi	South Taranaki	39°47′S 174°33′E	31	133	2021		Mercury Energy
Weld Cone	Marlborough		3	0.8	2010		Energy Marlborough
West Wind	Wellington	41°16′35″S 174°39′37″E	62	143	2009		Meridian Energy
White Hill	Southland	45°45′9″S 168°16′18″E	29	58	2007		Meridian Energy

== Solar ==
Name	Territorial authority	Coordinates	Number of inverters	Capacity (MWp DC)	Capacity (MW AC)	Commissioned	Closed	Operator
Wairau Valley Solar Farm	Marlborough	41°36′31″S 173°25′50″E	1	2		2021		Kea Energy
Kapuni Solar Plant	South Taranaki		Not Stated	2.1		2021		Sunergise
Kaitaia Solar Farm	Northland		6	32	23	Began 2023		Lodestone Energy
Te Ihi o te Ra Solar Farm	Gisborne			5.2		2023		Eastland Generation
Rangitaiki	Edgecumbe			32	24	2024		Lodestone Energy
New Plymouth Airport Solar Farm	New Plymouth			10		2025		Lodestone Energy
Lauriston Solar Farm	Canterbury			63	47	2025		Genesis Energy Limited FRV Services
Te Herenga o Te Ra	Edgecumbe			42	33	2025		Lodestone Energy
Pamu Ra ki Whitianga	Whitianga			33	29	2025		Lodestone Energy
Twin Rivers	Northland			31	24	2025		Ranui Generation
Pukenui	Te Aupōuri peninsula			28	21	2025		Far North Solar Farms
Te Puna Mauri ō Omaru	Ruawai			24	17	2025		Northpower
Papareireiā	Maungaturoto			22	18	2025		Ngāpuhi Investment Fund
Taiohi Solar Farm	Waikato			30	22	2025		WEL Networks

== Grid battery storage ==
Name	Territorial authority	Coordinates	Type	Capacity (MW/MWh)	Commissioned	Operator
Glen Innes	Auckland (Manugakiekie-Tamaki)		Tesla Powerpack	1.0/2.3	2016	Vector
Glenbrook-Ohurua	Auckland (Manugakiekie-Tamaki)		Tesla	100/200	2026	Contact Energy
Hobsonville Point	Auckland (Upper Harbour)		Tesla Powerpack	1.0/2.3	2018	Vector
Rotohiko	Waikato		Saft (company)	35/33	2023	WEL Networks
Ruakākā Energy Park	Northland		Saft (company)	100/200	2025	Meridian Energy
Snells Beach	Auckland (Rodney)			2.75/6.7	2018	Vector
Warkworth South	Auckland (Rodney)			2.0/4.8	2018	Vector
Whangamata (CBD standby power)	Thames-Coromandel			2.0/2.0	2020	Powerco

== Proposed power stations ==
Name	Location	Type	Planned capacity (MW)	Operator	Status	Notes
Awhitu	near Waiuku, Auckland	Wind	15	Private operator	2MW under construction	
Castle Hill	northeast of Masterton	Wind	300	Genesis Energy Limited	consented - seeking extension	
Clandeboye	South Cantebury	Solar	27	Lodestone Energy	under construction - online Q4 2026	
Edgecumbe Solar Farm	Edgecumbe	Solar	38	Far North Solar Farms	consented	
Edgecumbe Solar Farm Genesis	Edgecumbe	Solar	114	Genesis Energy Limited	under construction - online Q3 2027	
Foxton Solar Farm	Foxton	Solar	42	Far North Solar Farms	consented	
Huriwaka (prev. Central Wind)(Moawhango)	between Taihape and Waiouru	Wind	230 (prev. 130)	Manawa Energy	Previously Meridian Energy, consents lapsed, re-consenting underway with new developer Manawa Energy	
Te Mihi Stage 2	Taupō	Geothermal	101	Contact Energy	partially replaces Wairakei A & B legacy power stations - under construction. online Q3 2027	
Te Mihi Stage 3	Taupō	Geothermal	100	Contact Energy	Final replacement of Wairakei A & B legacy power stations. FID due FY28	
Glenbrook Battery 2.0	Glenbrook	Battery	200	Contact Energy	under construction - online March 2028	
Hauauru ma raki	Waikato coast	Wind	504	Contact Energy	consents lapsed	
Hurunui	North Canterbury	Wind	76	Meridian Energy	consents lapsed	
Huntly Battery	Huntly	Battery	100	Genesis Energy Limited	online Q1 2027	
Huntly Wind Farm	Huntly	Wind	200-300	Mercury Energy	In design	
Kaimai Wind Farm	northern Kaimai Range	Wind	168	Ventus Energy	applied for consent	
Kaiwaikawe	Dargaville	Wind	74	Mercury Energy	Under construction - first power mid 2026	
Kaiwera Downs Stage 2	south-east of Gore, Southland	Wind	155	Mercury Energy	Stage 2 - 155MW - under construction - first power mid-2026 - completion mid-2027	
Kowhai Park Solar Farm	Christchurch	Solar	168	Contact, Lightsource BP	Under construction - online Q2 2026	
Lodestone One	Dargaville	Solar	80	Lodestone Energy	consented	
Pukaki Intake	near Twizel, Canterbury	Hydro	35	Meridian Energy	consents lapsed	
Manawatu Battery	Manawatu	Battery	100	Meridian Energy	applied for consent	
Mahinerangi stage 2	Lake Mahinerangi, west of Dunedin	Wind	138	Mercury Energy	consented - FID due 2026	
Marsden Point	Northland	Solar	26.7	Refining NZ		
Mount Munro	Eketahuna	Wind	90	Meridian Energy	consented	
Rangiriri	Waikato	Solar	146	Island Green Power	in development	
Ruakākā Solar Farm	Northland	Solar	120	Meridian Energy	under construction	
Mount Cass	Canterbury	Wind	93	Yinson Holdings	under construction	
Ngakawau	West Coast	Hydro	24	Hydro Developments	Consents expire 2026	
Ngawha OEC5	Kaikohe	Geothermal	32	Top Energy	consented	
Onslow	Otago	Pumped hydro	1200	New Zealand Government	detailed investigation; cancelled after change of government	
Omeheu	Whakatane	Solar	27	Far North Solar Farm	under construction - online Q2 2026	
Puketoi	Manawatu	Wind	228	Mercury Energy	consents expire 2031. FID due mid 2027	
Rakaia River	Canterbury	Hydro	16	Ashburton Community Water Trust	consented	
Rangimarie	Waikato	Solar	10	NewPower	under construction	
Te Rāhui	Taupō	Solar	400	Nova Energy	consented - Stage 1 200MW under construction. first power 2026	
Rototuna	Northland	Wind	500	Meridian Energy		
Slopedown	east of Gore, Southland	Wind	150	Genesis Energy Limited		
Stratford Battery	Stratford, Taranaki	Battery	100	Contact Energy	consented	
Swannanoa	Christchurch	Solar	200	Meridian Energy	seeking consent	
Tauhara 2	Taupo	Geothermal	60-70	Contact Energy	in development. Earliest FID FY27	
Tauhara 3	Taupo	Geothermal	100	Contact Energy	in development. Earliest FID FY30	
Taheke	Okere Falls, Rotoiti	Geothermal	35	Eastland	consented	
Taumatatotara	10 km south of Taharoa	Wind	92	Ventus Energy	consented stage 1 (seeking amendment for stage 2 tip height of up to 180m)	
Te Rere Hau Wind Farm re-power	Palmerston North / Tararua	Wind	170	NZ Windfarms-Meridian	replace Windflow 91x500 kW with 39x4.2 MW turbines raising wind farm capacity to 170 MW	
Tararua Wind Farm re-power	Palmerston North / Tararua	Wind	60MW uplift to 221MW	Mercury Energy	replace turbines for uplift of 60MW to 221MW. Planned ~2030	
Tuahei	Te Aroha	Solar	150	First Renewables Harmony Energy	under construction, first power 2026	
Tory Channel	Marlborough	Tidal	10	Energy Pacifica		
Upper Kaituna	Bay of Plenty	Hydro	14	Bay of Plenty Energy	concession granted. project not being pursued	
Waikato Solar	Waikato	Solar	100	Meridian Energy	design	
Waitahe Solar Farm	Waiotahe	Solar	81	Far North Solar Farms	consented	
Waiinu Energy Park	Taranaki	Wind/Solar/ Battery	350 Wind 550 Solar	Meridian	seeking fast track consent	
Waerenga	Waikato	Solar	190	Island Green Power	in development	
Waikato Power Station	Tihiroa, Waikato	Gas	360	Todd Generation	consented (expires 2027); project not being pursued	
Western Bay Solar Project	Kuratau	Solar	500	Meridian	seeking fast track consent	
Whakamaru Battery	Whakamaru	Battery	150	Mercury Energy	preliminary design	

== See also ==
- Energy in New Zealand
- Electricity sector in New Zealand
- List of New Zealand spans
- New Zealand electricity market
