= Cobb Power Station =

Hydroelectric power station in New Zealand

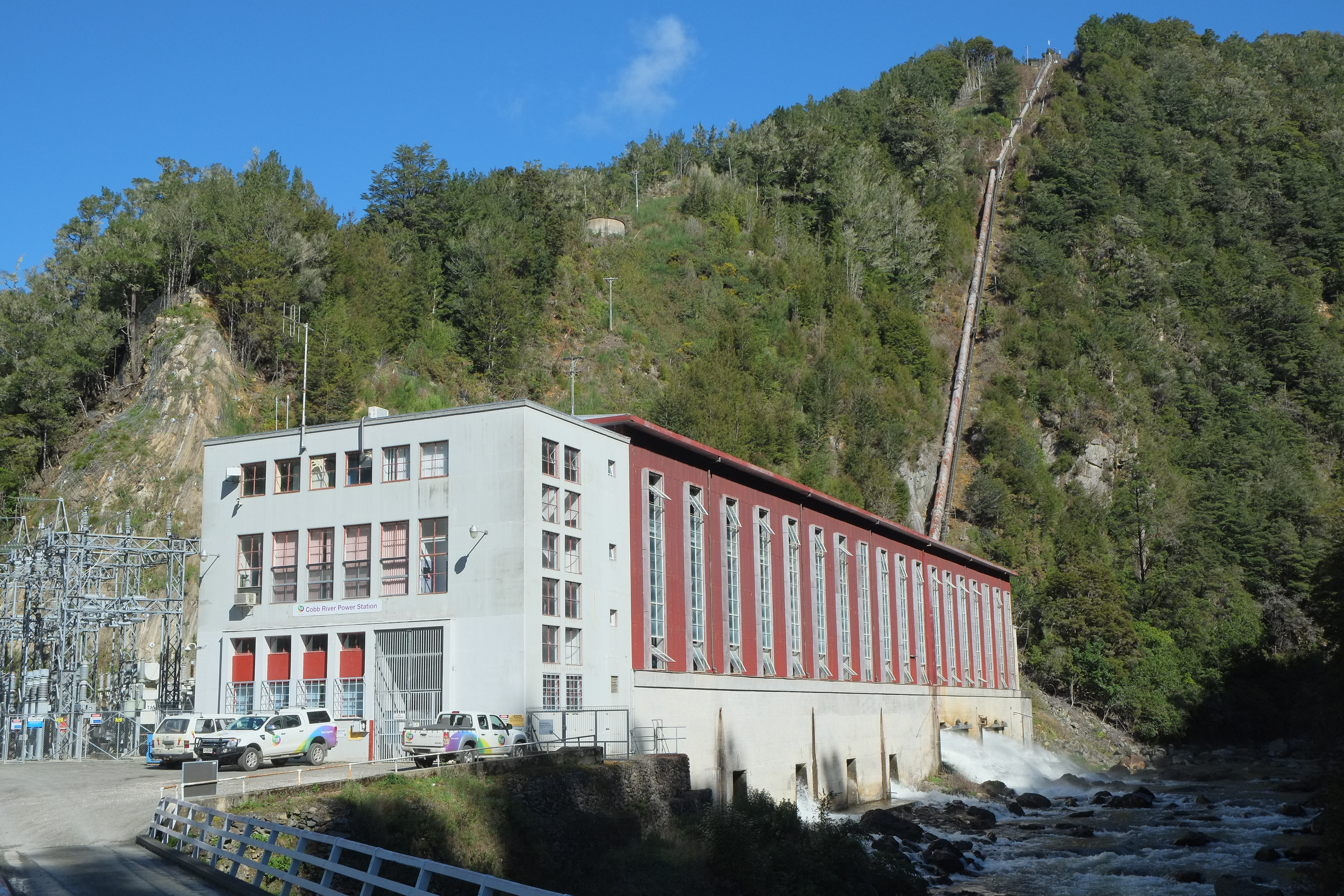
- Cobb Power Station, with penstock visible behind it
- Country: New Zealand
- Location: Tasman District
- Coordinates: 41°5′10″S 172°43′56″E
- Status: Operational
- Commission date: 1944
- Owner: Contact Energy

Thermal power station
- Turbine technology: Hydroelectric

Power generation
- Units operational: 6
- Nameplate capacity: 32 MW (43,000 hp)

External links
- Website: www.manawaenergy.co.nz/cobb-power-station
- Commons: Related media on Commons

The Cobb Power Station is a hydroelectric facility on the Cobb River, in the Tasman District of New Zealand. The power station is located in Upper Tākaka, 112 km (70 mi) northwest of Nelson. Annual generation is approximately 190 gigawatt-hours (680 TJ). The initial stages of the construction of the station began as a privately funded scheme in 1935, but the investor failed to raise the necessary capital. The national government took over building the station and the first power was produced in 1944, operating as a run-of-river station. A storage dam was completed in 1954. The resulting hydro lake is the highest in the country and at 596 m (1,955 ft), the station has New Zealand's highest hydraulic head of any power station.

== History ==
Early supply of electricity to the Nelson /Tasman region included a small scheme at Motueka that had been approved in 1919, and a coal-fired steam generating plant commissioned in Nelson in 1923. The Pupu Hydro Power Scheme near Tākaka and the Onekaka Power Station in Onekaka were both commissioned in 1929, the latter initially just supplying the Onekaka Ironworks. However, by 1934, rapidly increasing demand led to the need for additional generating capacity in the region. At the time, the region was not connected to the rest of the South Island national grid, and central Government did not have firm plans for additional generation in the area.

=== Hume Pipe Company scheme ===
In 1935, the Waimea and Golden Bay Electric Power Boards, together with Nelson City Council, supported a proposal by the Hume Pipe Company to construct a hydro power station on the Cobb River.

The Hume Pipe Company was an Australian-based company active in mining and manufacture of asbestos. It was led by Walter Hume who invented the spun concrete pipe. The company was interested in mining in the Tākaka and Collingwood areas, and combining the extraction of asbestos from the upper Tākaka River and cement from Tarakohe. However, they required a large supply of electricity, and proposed the development of a hydro power station on the Cobb River where it descended around 610 m (2,000 ft) in a direct line of less than 4.8 km (3 mi). The scheme was to divert water from the upper reaches of the Cobb River, and then through tunnels and penstocks to the powerhouse, located at the junction of the Tākaka and Cobb Rivers.

It was Henry Chaffey who was mining asbestos in the area. Chaffey had also, since 1923, kept rainfall records and Cobb River flow rates; this was invaluable for the design of the power station.

A 40-year licence was granted to Hume Pipe Company in July 1935, on the basis that they were to sell surplus electricity for use in the Nelson region, and that power should be delivered within two years. However, in 1936, the Hume Pipe Company failed to raise the necessary capital to commence construction of the scheme. Work began on construction of an access road from Upper Tākaka to the site of the power station. In 1938, Hume asked the New Zealand government to underwrite an issue of debenture capital, but this was rejected by the Minister of Finance, Walter Nash.

=== Government ownership ===
The government took over the project in 1940. By that stage, a powerhouse building had been constructed that would accommodate four generating units. Further work was delayed by shortages of labour and materials during World War II, and the first power was not generated until June 1944. At that stage, there was no storage and the scheme operated as a run-of-river station.

Storage was required to enable more reliable generation. The site of the dam for the scheme was found to be not suitable for a concrete dam, and over the period 1949 to 1954 an earth dam was built instead. The height of the dam above the foundation is 35 m (115 ft) and it has a crest length of 214 m (702 ft). The dam was commissioned in 1954, and at the time, it was the largest dam of its type in New Zealand. The nominal elevation of the Cobb Reservoir above sea level is 808 m (2,651 ft), making it the highest hydro storage lake in the country.

Cobb was the main generating station supplying the Nelson and Tasman areas as an isolated electricity supply network until 1955, when a transmission line connection was made from Stoke to the rest of the South Island grid.

=== Changes of ownership ===
In 1997, as part of reforms of the energy sector, the New Zealand Government decided to sell eight small power stations including Cobb. The Cobb Power Station was sold to the Canadian company TransAlta in 1999. There was a change of ownership only a year later, when the Natural Gas Corporation (NGC) purchased TransAlta New Zealand. In 2003, there was a further change of ownership, when TrustPower purchased the power station from NGC. Trustpower restructured its business in 2022, and sold its retail energy business to Mercury Energy. The generation part of the business was rebranded as Manawa Energy and launched on 2 May 2022. Contact Energy subsequently acquired Manawa Energy in July 2025.

== Description ==
The station is fed by the Cobb Reservoir and has a head of 596 m (1,955 ft), the highest of any power station in New Zealand. From the reservoir, a 2.6 km (1.6 mi) long tunnel leads through the Cobb Range to the penstocks. The water flow is channelled via two 4 km (2.5 mi) long penstocks and the height difference between the intake and the power station results in a high pressure water flow of 7.25 m³/s to feed the six Pelton turbines.

Cobb Power Station can be reached from Upper Tākaka via a sealed but winding and narrow 16 km (9.9 mi) road along Tākaka River. The power station building is situated at the edge of Kahurangi National Park, with the reservoir located entirely within the national park, another 14 km (8.7 mi) further up an unsealed steep and winding road. The access road to the reservoir is the only road into the interior of Kahurangi National Park.

== See also ==
- Electricity sector in New Zealand
- List of power stations in New Zealand
