= Henry Chaffey =

Hermit in New Zealand (1868–1951)

Henry Fox Chaffey (18 August 1868 – 19 August 1951) was a New Zealand recluse and asbestos miner. He gained fame for sharing a remote mountain cottage with his partner Annie for 36 years.

== Early life ==
Henry Chaffey was born in Somerset, England, in 1868 to a prosperous farming family. He travelled to New Zealand as a farm cadet at age 17. By 1907 he owned agricultural equipment and a threshing mill in Timaru in South Canterbury. He married Laua Adcock on 11 March 1903. The couple separated after about a year and divorced on 7 March 1908. In the early 1900s, Henry met Annie Fox (née Best), who was married with two children and whose husband was frequently absent.

== Mining activities ==
In 1908 Chaffey began prospecting gold near the Wharepapa / Arthur Range in northwest Nelson. Within a few years he began to mine asbestos in the Cobb Valley area, which he cleaned then transported out. He continued to mine asbestos until 1935, when he teamed up with Australian entrepreneur Walter Hume. Hume travelled to the area after Chaffey posted him an asbestos sample. Hume's company made a claim to prospect asbestos on 500 acres (200 ha) of land, and he made Chaffey a paid caretaker of the site. This arrangement continued until Hume's death in 1945.

== Asbestos Cottage ==
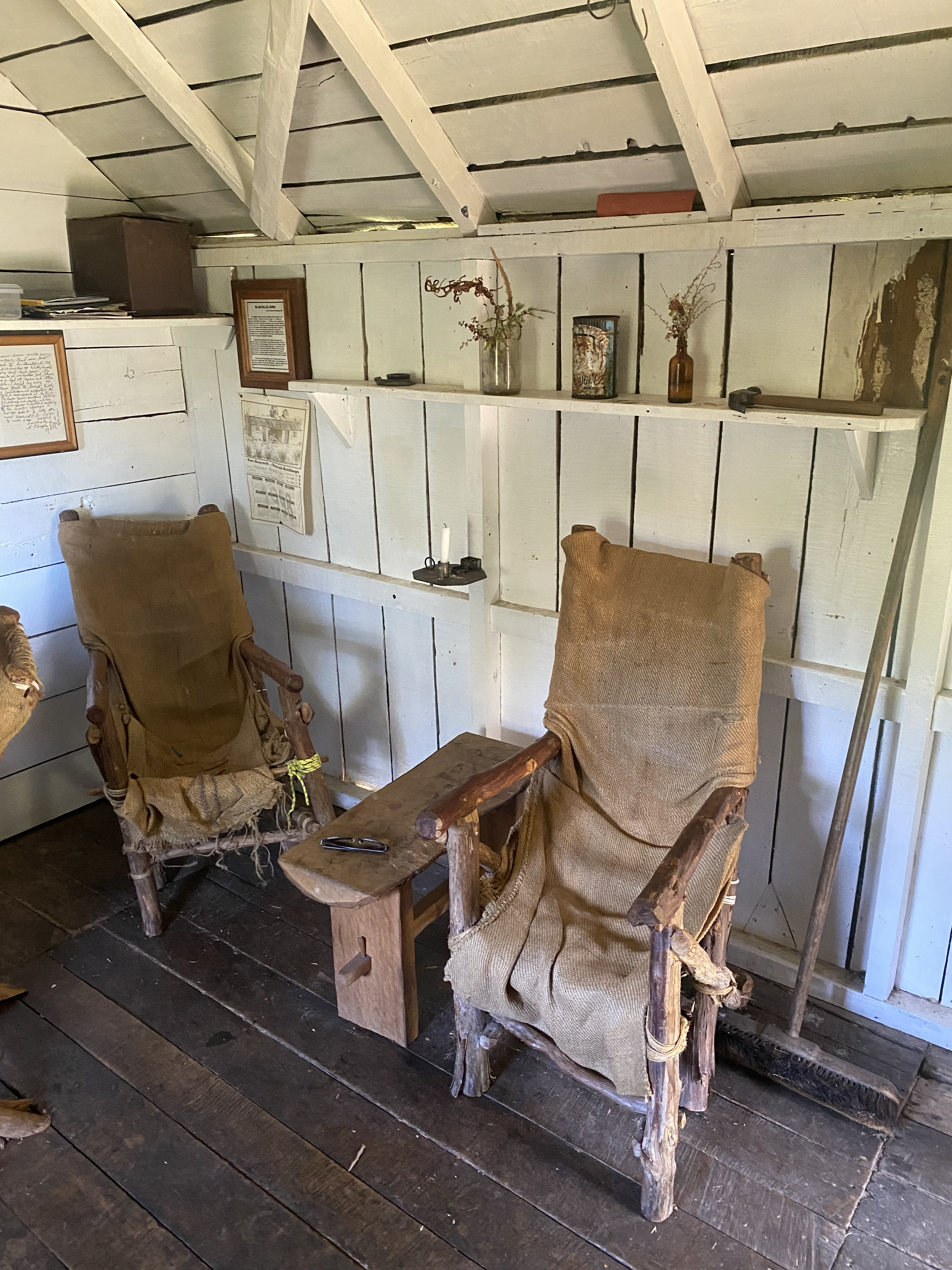
Interior of Asbestos Cottage

When Henry Chaffey settled in the West Nelson ranges, he first lived in a disused hut at Arthur Creek. Annie Fox joined him there in 1913. Around 1915 the couple moved to another disused hut, later known as Asbestos Cottage. The cottage was built in the late 1890s by a company prospecting nearby asbestos deposits.

The couple lived in the remote cottage for some 36 years. They married on 5 April 1932 following the death of Annie's husband. A Presbyterian minister rode to the cottage to conduct the ceremony. Annie left the cottage only once, for hospital treatment, but Henry regularly visited the outside world and was an avid correspondent. He travelled by foot to Motueka and Upper Tākaka for supplies and to transport out prospected gold and asbestos. These journeys required him to carry heavy loads, and were made much easier after the road to the Cobb Power Station was completed in the late 1930s. Chaffey began keeping records of rainfall and water levels in the Cobb river from 1923, and these records proved invaluable in the planning of the Cobb Dam.

The Chaffey's received regular visitors in their remote cottage, and took pride in providing them with food and drink. They were protective of their privacy and placed signs near Asbestos Cottage asking visitors to call out when approaching. This gave them the opportunity to change into their best clothes to receive visitors.

Henry Chaffey died in the mountains on 19 August 1951, aged 83. Asbestos Cottage was subsequently repaired and preserved by the New Zealand Forest Service and Department of Conservation.
