= Whirinaki =

Whirinaki may refer to:

- Whirinaki, Northland
- Whirinaki, Hawke's Bay
- Whirinaki Te Pua-a-Tāne Conservation Park
- Whirinaki Power Station
