= Pan Pacific =

Pan Pacific or Pan Pac can refer to:

- Pan-Pacific Auditorium, a former auditorium in Los Angeles
- Pan Pacific Park, a public park and recreation center in Los Angeles
- Pan-Pacific Championship, an association football championship, begun in 2008
- Pan Pac Forest Products Ltd, a forestry company based in New Zealand
- Pan Pacific Hotels and Resorts
- Pan Pacific Swimming Championships, begun in 1985
- Toray Pan Pacific Open, a WTA Tour affiliated professional tennis tournament for women
- Pan Pacific International Holdings (PPIH), the Japan-based parent company of Don Quijote, Marukai Corporation U.S.A., and Times Supermarkets
