= Cobb River =

Cobb River may refer to:

- Cobb River, New Zealand
- Cobb River (Minnesota), United States
