= Otahuhu Power Station =

Former power station in New Zealand

Ōtāhuhu Power Station
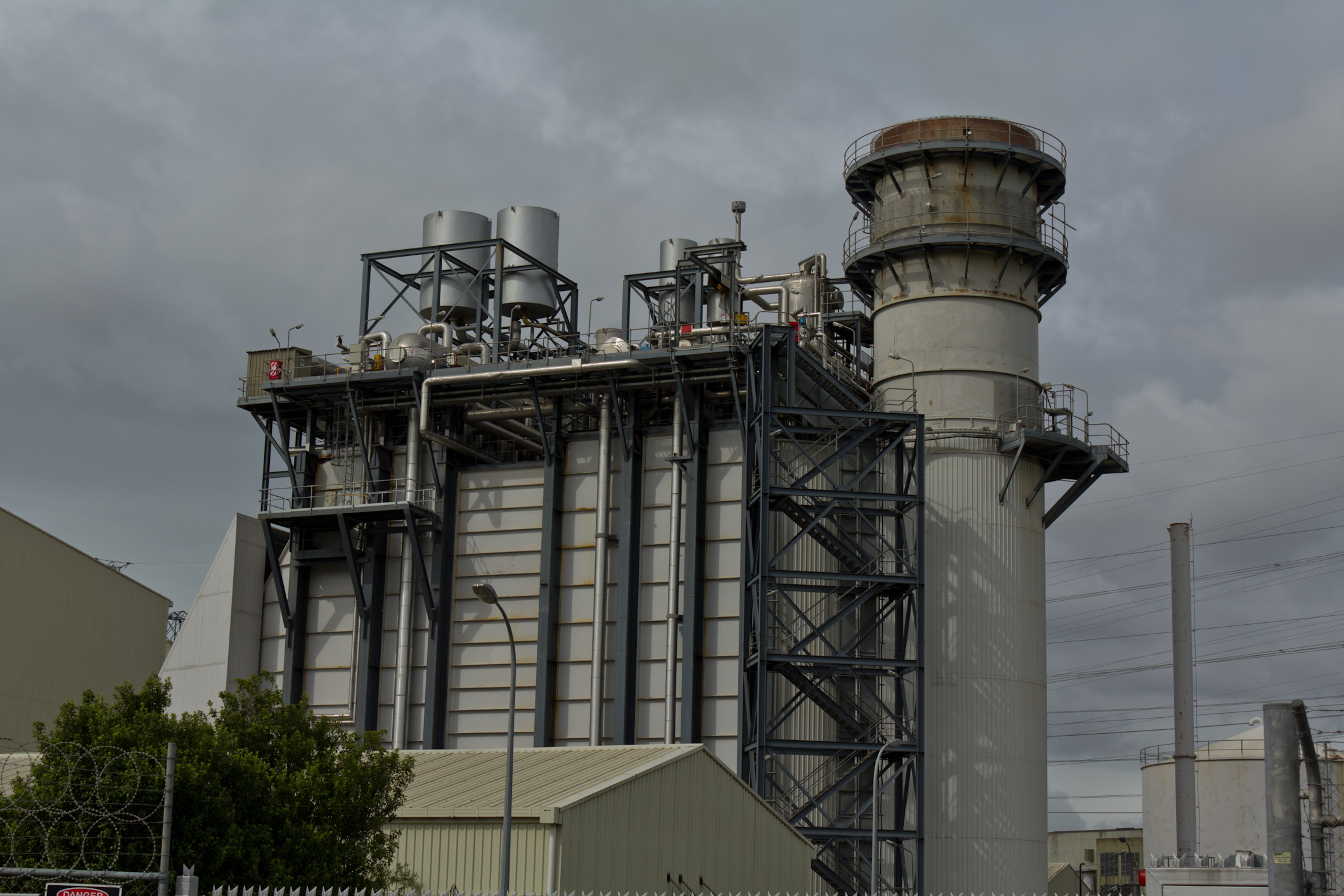
- Ōtāhuhu Power Station's 404 MW combined cycle turbine. Also known as Ōtāhuhu B.
- Country: New Zealand
- Location: Ōtāhuhu, Auckland
- Coordinates: 36°57.072′S 174°51.923′E
- Status: Operational
- Commission date: 1968, 2000
- Decommission date: 2013, 2015
- Owner: Contact Energy

Thermal power station
- Primary fuel: Natural gas
- Turbine technology: combined cycle
- Cooling source: Sea water cooling tower

Power generation
- Units operational: Siemens V94.3A(2)
- Nameplate capacity: 404 MW

The Ōtāhuhu power station was a power station site located in Ōtara, Auckland, New Zealand. Two plants operated on the site: Ōtāhuhu A (initially open cycle gas turbines, then synchronous compensation) and Ōtāhuhu B (a 404 MW combined cycle). A proposed third station, Ōtāhuhu C, was never built. The stations were owned by Contact Energy.

The site was sold by Contact in 2016.

== Ōtāhuhu A (OTG) ==
The first generating units at Ōtāhuhu were open cycle gas turbine Stal-Laval units, commissioned in 1968. The plant comprised four 45 MW gas turbine units.

In 1978, a further two generating units were added, twin pack units using Rolls-Royce Olympus gas turbines.

The Ōtāhuhu A gas turbines were retired from electricity generation in the late 1990s, however they remained in continuous service providing reactive power to Transpower NZ, owner of the national grid. In November 2013, the generators were retired from service and decommissioned.

== Ōtāhuhu B (OTC) ==
The combined cycle plant was commissioned in January 2000. This natural gas fired plant comprises a Siemens V94.3A(2) gas turbine in single shaft configuration. The HRSG is unfired triple pressure with reheat. Steam cycle cooling is by a hybrid wet - dry cooling tower, using sea water makeup.

At commissioning, the plant capacity was 385 MW. In 2005, upgrades to plant components (including the gas turbine compressor) resulted in an increase of plant capacity to approximately 404 MW.

The combined cycle power station ceased generation at the end of September 2015.

== Ōtāhuhu C ==
The Ōtāhuhu C power station was a proposal for a 400 MW combined cycle power station. Resource consents were granted by Auckland Regional Council for the plant in 2001, but construction never commenced.

In 2002, the Environmental Defence Society (EDS) appealed the resource consents. EDS argued that the predicted annual emissions of 1.2 million tonnes of carbon dioxide would contribute to climate change via the greenhouse effect and that the consent conditions should require complete carbon offsetting by planting of new forests. The Environment Court agreed with the scientific consensus on anthropogenic climate change and concluded that the proposed CO_{2} emissions would be an "adverse effect of some consequence". The court declined to impose the forest offsetting condition due to concerns over its "efficacy, appropriateness and reasonableness".

In December 2002, Contact announced it was postponing the construction of the Ōtāhuhu-C plant because of possible future insecurities of gas supply related to the expected depletion of the Maui gas field. In 2007, Contact said it would still be deferring a decision on the project as it was giving priority to renewable generation. CEO David Baldwin indicated that new generation growth would come primarily from new geothermal capacity. Also the Ōtāhuhu C proposal should wait for the Government's intentions to adopt a market-based carbon pricing system to become clear. Baldwin still considered the Ōtāhuhu C proposal was the most efficient gas-fired proposal in New Zealand and that it could help reduce emissions if it replaced less efficient coal generation.

The proposed site was sold by Contact in 2016.

== See also ==
- List of power stations in New Zealand
