= List of New Zealand spans =

This is a list of remarkable overhead powerline spans within New Zealand.

Name / Location	Type	Width of span	Height of span	Notes
Tory Channel Crossing, between mainland and Arapawa Island	Overhead powerline	2029 metres	Varied: 160 metres at highest point, 91 metres at lowest	Unmarked, has been subject to wire-strike. One of the longest spans in the world.
Greville Harbour Crossing, D'Urville Island	Overhead powerline, single wire (single wire earth return system)	1500 metres	27 metres	
Barron Stream Crossing, Golden Bay	Overhead powerline, 2 three phase 66kV circuits	1300m	115m sag	
West Arm Crossing, Lake Manapouri	Overhead powerline (multiple circuits)	1200 metres	50 metres?	Marked with red balls, has been subject to wire-strike
Percy Burn Crossing, Borland Valley	Overhead powerline	1100 metres	300 metres or higher	
French Pass Crossing, between mainland and D'Urville Island	Overhead powerline	1020 metres	75.9 metres	Unmarked, has been subject to wire-strike

== See also ==
- List of power stations in New Zealand
