= Long Gully Wind Farm =

Wind Mills

- Country: New Zealand
- Location: Wellington
- Coordinates: 41°19′36″S 174°43′4″E
- Status: Proposed

Power generation
- Units operational: 25
- Nameplate capacity: 12.5 MW

Long Gully Wind Farm was a proposed wind farm in Wellington, New Zealand. Long Gully is an area adjacent to Zealandia (formerly known as the Karori Wildlife Sanctuary).

The proposal involved using turbines manufactured by the New Zealand company Windflow Technology Limited. In 2008, Windflow Technology took on the overall management of the project.

Windflow Technology announced in 2009 that Wellington City Council had granted resource consents for the wind farm. Two appeals against the consent were lodged and according to Windflow were resolved in principle by mid-2010.

Mighty River Power (now Mercury Energy) was involved in early development of the proposal, but withdrew in 2010. In late 2010, the proposed wind farm was on hold as Windflow Technology did not want to pursue the proposal in the short-term due to low wholesale electricity prices. In 2012 a community group attempted to raise funds to begin construction.

Consents for the project have now lapsed.

== See also ==
- Wind power in New Zealand
