= Windflow Technology =

New Zealand wind energy company

- Type: Public
- Traded as: NZX: WTL
- Industry: Wind Power
- Headquarters: Christchurch, New Zealand
- Key people: Geoff Henderson
- Products: wind turbines
- Revenue: NZ$1.8M (2016); NZ$3.7M (2015); NZ$2.1M (2014)

Windflow Technology was a company based in Christchurch, New Zealand, known for its unique wind turbine gearbox design and two-bladed turbines.

Founded in 2000 the company was listed on the New Zealand Stock Exchange in 2003. In October 2008, Mighty River Power purchased a 19.95% share of Windflow Technology. However the company delisted in November 2018 due to its uncertain future.

== History ==
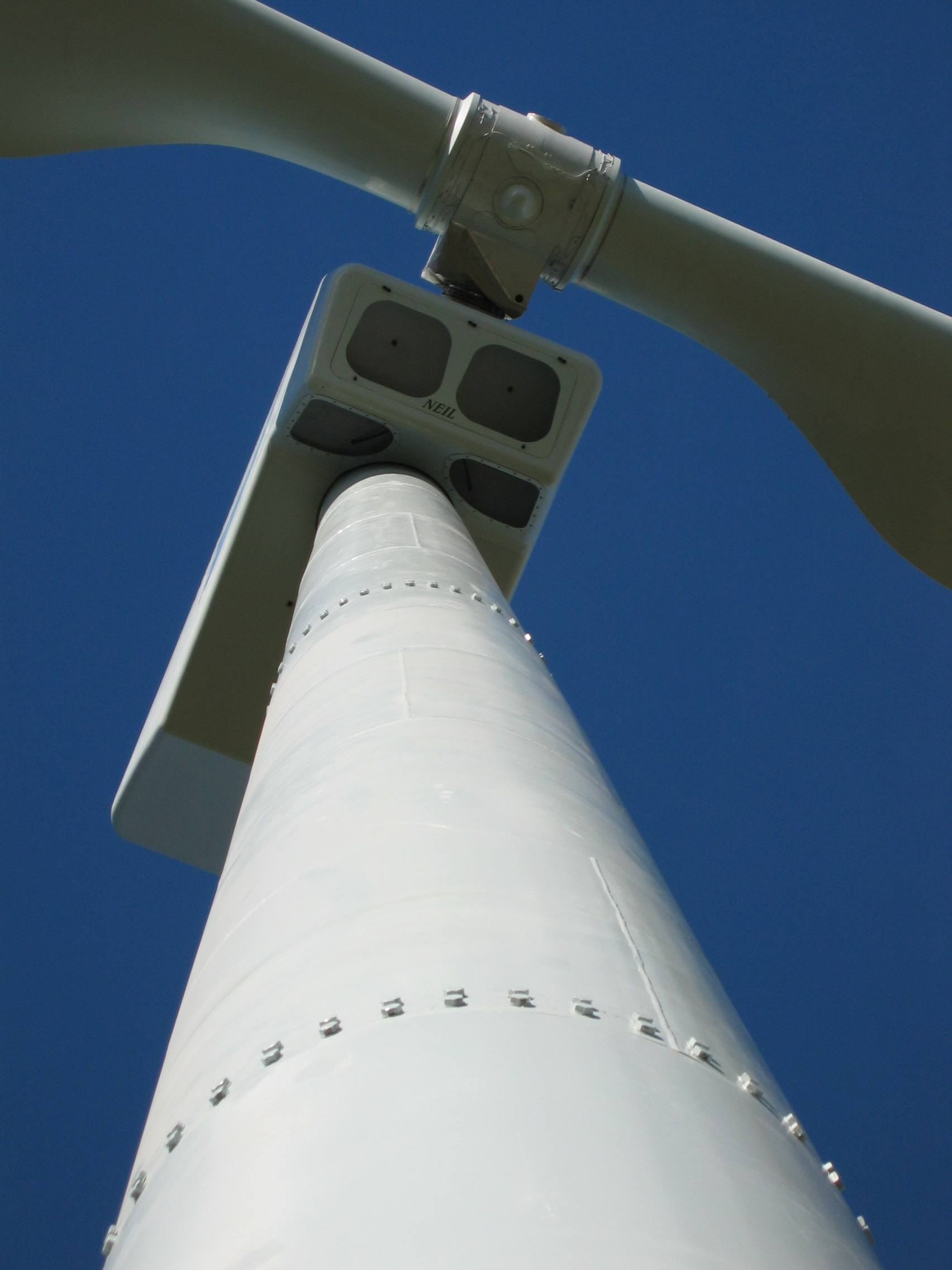
Windflow's prototype wind turbine, installed at Gebbies Pass.

The operation of a Windflow Technology turbine installed at Gebbies Pass near Christchurch encountered opposition from local residents who raised concerns about noise. The neighbouring valley was very sheltered, and therefore had very little background sound. Because of this, Windflow offered to comply with low sound levels of 30 dBA, 10 dBA lower than the District Council's usual requirement of 40 dBA. However, sound levels were at 35 dBA, so Windflow modified the gearbox, which reduced the turbine's sound. Sound levels were again measured and this time they were within the requirement of its resource consent. The turbine was dismantled in 2016.

Windflow Technology set up New Zealand Windfarms to own and run the Te Rere Hau Wind Farm near Palmerston North. Initially, this was wholly owned but was sold off. Windflow Technology supplied 97 turbines for this wind farm It was also contracted to supply turbines for Mighty River Power's proposed Long Gully Wind Farm but Mighty River pulled out of the project. Meridian Energy and Genesis Energy both rejected using Windflow turbines in favour of European models.

The company achieved ISO 9001:2000 certification for the design and production of its Windflow 500 wind turbine in 2008. In September 2010, the Windflow 500 gained Class 1A of the International Electrotechnical Commission (IEC) design standard IEC 61400-1 (edition 3) through Lloyd's Register.

Although Windflow Technology signed a contract to install a Windflow 500 turbine on the island of Shetland in September 2011 it was not until 2012 that they announced their first export of their technology for a turbine on Westray, Orkney. The expansion into the UK was encouraged by the UK government's "feed-in tariff". The company was to install eight turbines in Scotland.

In February 2013, Windflow's first exported turbine (a 500 kW turbine) was installed at Hammer Farm on Westray. One turbine was erected at New Holland Farm on the Orkney mainland. On Harris in the Outer Hebrides the North Harris Trust worked with Windflow Technology Ltd to install their two-bladed machines that can deal with the turbulent wind conditions found amongst the North Harris hills. Three turbines were installed at Monan in 2014–2015. Another turbine was installed at Ludenhill on Orkney, one at Easter Aberchalder, near Inverness, and one north of Edinburgh.

From March 2020 the UK turbines were maintained by Constantine Wind Energy.

In March 2012, the company signed a licensing agreement with a subsidiary of large US company General Dynamics (GD Satcom) to manufacture and sell the Windflow designed 500 kW turbines to customers in North and South America, Africa and U.S. territories and military bases worldwide.

In May 2015, Windflow Technology Ltd announced the installation and first operation of the prototype 45-500 wind turbine at a site in Mitchell County, Texas USA. The turbine was installed to supply power for the Mitchell County Desalination Plant, which will supplement water supplies to areas in the County not covered by municipal water utilities.

Windflow went into voluntary liquidation in December 2019.

== See also ==
- Wind power in New Zealand
