= Whirinaki Power Station =

Petroleum power station

- Country: New Zealand
- Location: Whirinaki, Hawke's Bay
- Coordinates: 39°22′59″S 176°53′16″E
- Status: Operational
- Commission date: 2004
- Owner: Contact Energy
- Operator: Contact Energy

Thermal power station
- Primary fuel: Diesel

Power generation
- Units operational: 3
- Make and model: Pratt & Whitney
- Nameplate capacity: 155 MW

The Whirinaki Power Station is an open cycle gas turbine power station at Whirinaki in Hawke's Bay, New Zealand.

== FT4 plant ==
The NZED constructed a 220 MW gas turbine power station on this site, which began operation in 1978. This power station comprised four Pratt & Whitney twinpac units, each with two FT4 gas turbines (based on the JT4A). This plant was fueled with diesel, which meant electricity generation was expensive and the plant very rarely operated.

In 1993, one twin-pac unit was moved to construct a gas fired cogeneration plant at the Te Awamutu dairy factory. In 2001, the remaining three units were sold and removed to become three of the six units at the Valley Power Peaking Facility in Australia.

== FT8 plant ==
Following national power shortages in 2001 and 2003 due to low hydro lake levels, the New Zealand government commissioned Contact Energy to build reserve generation on the Whirinaki site. This plant was intended to be a generator of last resort, providing back up generation when needed, usually during years of low hydro lake levels, but also when there was a shortfall in generation reserves on the electricity market, such as after the failure of a major power station or the HVDC Inter-Island link. The power station cost $150 million and was opened in June 2004.

The diesel-fuelled station comprises three Pratt & Whitney twinpacs, each with two FT8 gas turbines. Designed to be a standby power station, it has a total capacity of 155 MW. It was owned by the Government but maintained and operated by Contact Energy.

The station was due to be transferred to Meridian Energy on 1 October 2010 as part of the 2010 electricity market reforms, but Meridian refused to buy it. The New Zealand Government announced in December 2010 it would sell it by tender. The Ministry of Economic Development offered the plant for sale by competitive tender and Contact Energy bought it on 22 December 2011.

== See also ==
- Electricity sector in New Zealand
- List of power stations in New Zealand
