= Ruakākā Energy Park =

Photovoltaic power station in New Zealand

Ruakākā
- Country: New Zealand
- Location: Ruakākā
- Coordinates: 35°50′51.74″S 174°28′39.54″E
- Status: Under construction
- Construction cost: NZ$227 million
- Owner: Meridian Energy

Solar farm
- Type: Flat-panel PV
- Site area: 172ha

Power generation
- Nameplate capacity: 130 MWp
- Annual net output: 230 GWh

The Ruakākā Energy Park is a co-located battery energy storage system (BESS) and photovoltaic power station in Ruakākā, Northland, New Zealand. The BESS has an output of 100MW and storage of 200MWh. The solar farm is still under construction. When complete, it will have a peak output of 130 MWp, and generate up to 230 GWh of electricity a year. The facility is owned and operated by Meridian Energy.

== BESS ==
In December 2021, Meridian announced plans for a solar farm and battery energy storage system adjacent to the Marsden Point Oil Refinery. The battery system would be next to the Bream bay substation, and was consented in November 2022. The system comprises 80 containerised Saft battery modules, with a total storage of 200 MWh and an output of 100 MW. Construction began in March 2023, and was completed in May 2025.

== Solar farm ==
A solar farm was first proposed at Marsden Point in 2019, when RefiningNZ, owners of the nearby Marsden Point Oil Refinery, proposed a small 26MW farm to reduce the refinery's electricity costs. The project was consented, but put on hold following the shutdown and dismantling of the refinery.

Meridian applied for resource consent for the solar farm in March 2024, covering three sites to the south of the old Refinery site. Consented was granted in September 2024, with conditions requiring wetland restoration to offset the destruction of on-site wetlands. In March 2025 Meridian announced that construction would begin in August 2025.

Construction of the solar farm began in October 2025. The farm is expected to begin generating electricity by late 2026, with commissioning in early 2027.

Shortly after construction began, local hapū Te Parawhau pointed out that the project was being built on land stolen from them by the New Zealand government in the 19th century.

== See also ==
- Solar power in New Zealand
