= Te Rere Hau Wind Farm =

New Zealand wind farm company

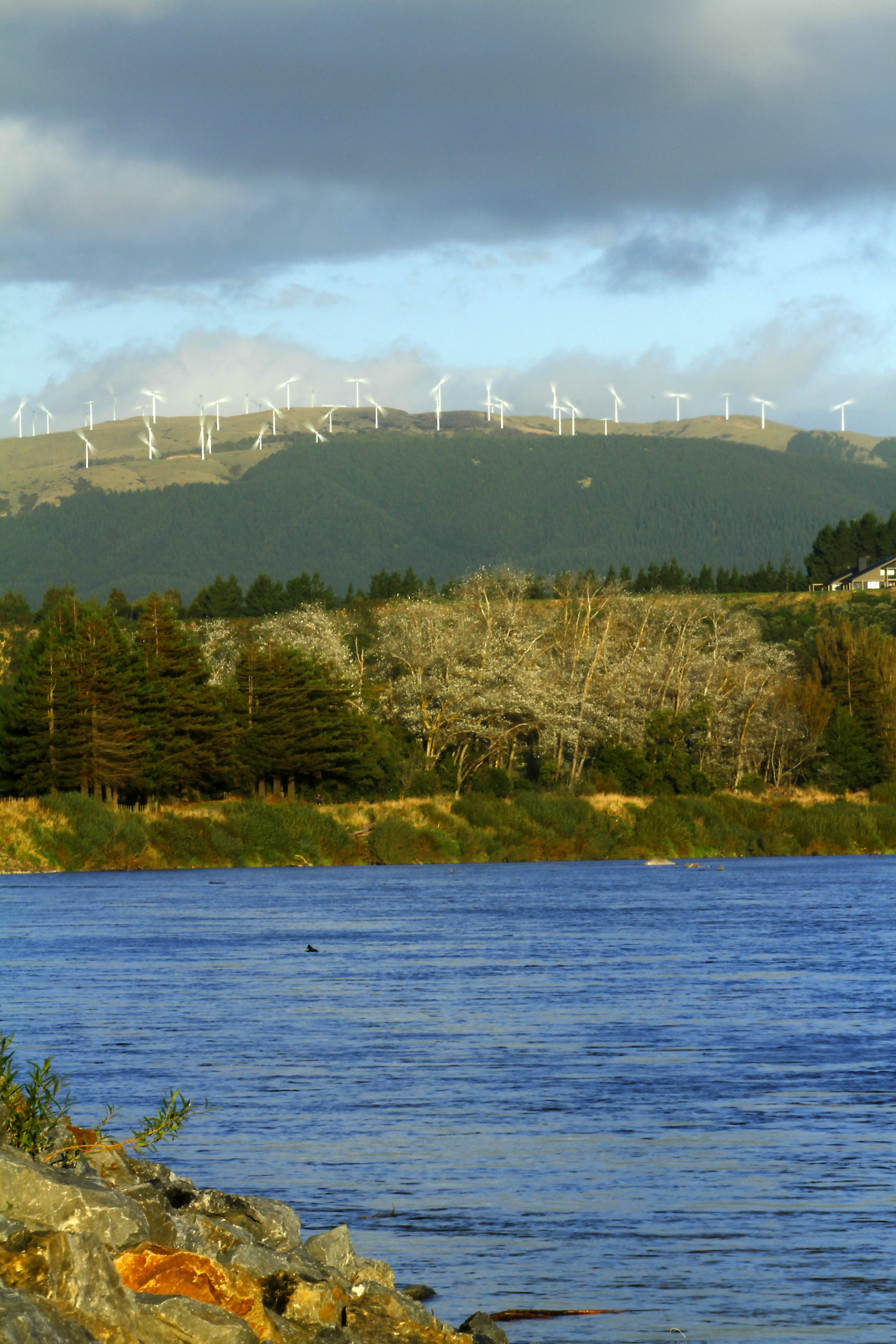
- Country: New Zealand
- Location: Tararua Ranges
- Coordinates: 40°23′18″S 175°43′27″E
- Commission date: 2011
- Owner: NZ Windfarms

Power generation
- Units operational: 97
- Nameplate capacity: 48.5 MW

External links
- Commons: Related media on Commons

Te Rere Hau is a wind farm located on the Tararua Ranges, approximately 11 km east of Palmerston North in New Zealand. Originally built by New Zealand Windfarms Ltd., it is now owned and operated by Meridian Energy.

== Original windfarm ==
In 2003, New Zealand Windfarms were assisted by the New Zealand government under the Projects to Reduce Emissions programme and were issued with Kyoto Protocol emission units for the proposal on the grounds that it would reduce emissions of greenhouse gases.

The first stage was officially opened in September 2006 by RT Hon Helen Clark and it consisted of five 500 kW turbines. Stage 2 (28 turbines) and Stage 3 (32 turbines) were completed in 2009. The final Stage 4 (32 turbines) was completed in 2011. In total Te Rere Hau has 97 wind turbines with a generating capacity of 48.5 MW, which is enough to power approximately 18,000 local households. The turbines generated a total of 123 GWh in the year up to June 2015.

The Windflow 500 turbines, made in New Zealand by Windflow Technology, stand 30 metres high with a rotor diameter of 33 metres. They have a two-bladed design, making them easily distinguishable from those of the nearby Tararua and Te Āpiti wind farms.

Te Rere Hau is the first commercial wind farm in the country to use locally manufactured wind turbines. By using turbines that have been designed and made in New Zealand, over 90% of the project cost stays in the country.

In July 2012, after frequent complaints over noise, Palmerston North City Council (PNCC) took a case against the owners to the Environment Court. The court ruled that NZ Windfarms was in breach of noise limits stated in its resource consent and that the noise predictions supplied by NZ Windfarms in the resource consent application were wrong. PNCC CEO Paddy Clifford stated "we can start working towards a resolution with NZ Windfarms".

The Environment Court ruling was successfully appealed to the High Court with judgment delivered in June 2013. The Palmerston North City Council then failed in its appeal of the High Court decision to the Court of Appeal with judgment delivered in December 2014.

== Repowering ==
In April 2022, NZ Windfarms announced plans to repower the farm, replacing its Windflow-500 turbines with larger, three-bladed turbines. In February 2023 the Environmental Protection Authority appointed an expert panel to consider the application. Resource consent was granted in May 2023. In October 2023 NZ Windfarms announced that the repowering and expansion would be funded as a joint venture with Meridian Energy. The extension would add up to 39 new turbines with a generation capacity of up to 170 megawatts. Consent was granted for the extension in August 2024, with a duration of two years. New Zealand Windfarms was subsequently acquired by Meridian Energy, who took over the repowering project.

Consent for the repowering was granted in July 2026. The expanded, repowered windfarm will consist of 40 turbines, with a capacity of up to 172MW.

== See also ==
- Wind power in New Zealand
