= Kaiwera Downs Wind Farm =

Wind farm in New Zealand

- Country: New Zealand
- Location: Gore
- Coordinates: 46°14′29″S 169°3′21″E
- Construction began: October 2022
- Commission date: November 2023
- Construction cost: 115m (stage 1)
- Owner: Mercury Energy

Wind farm
- Type: Onshore
- Hub height: 77m
- Rotor diameter: 136m
- Site elevation: 400m – 460m

Power generation
- Units operational: 10 x 4.3 MW
- Make and model: V136-4.2 MW in 4.3 MW operating mode
- Units planned: 155 MW
- Nameplate capacity: 198 MW
- Annual net output: 148 GWh (Stage 1) 525 GWh (Stage 2)

The Kaiwera Downs Wind Farm is a wind farm in the Southland region of New Zealand. It is consented to have a maximum capacity of 198 MW and use up to 76 turbines. Originally proposed by Trustpower, it is now owned and operated by Mercury Energy. The 10 turbine, 43 MW stage 1 of the project was opened in November 2023. The 36 turbine stage 2 of the project was completed in 2026.

The completed wind farm will generate 673GWh per annum. Power stations that contribute similar amounts of energy to the grid in New Zealand are Waitaki Dam (500GWh) and Karāpiro Power Station (537 GWh).

The New Zealand Ministry for Culture and Heritage gives a translation of "hot food" for Kaiwera.

== Location and Resource ==
The wind farm is located about 15 kilometres south-east of Gore, within an area of 2,568 hectares (25.68 km^{2}). Access to the site from the port at Bluff is "considered excellent".

The prevailing south-west/ westerly winds blow with an average wind speed of 8.7 – 8.9 m/s.

== Construction ==
The project received resource consent in June 2008. In September 2018 Tilt said that the development was waiting for favourable market conditions. In June 2021 Tilt announced the project was being acquired by Mercury Energy. In June 2022 Mercury began talks with the local community over the wind farm.

=== Stage 1 ===
Installation of an initial ten turbines totalling 43 MW of generation is expected to start in October 2022. Earthworks began in the first week of October 2022. A sod-turning ceremony was held in November 2022. As of February 2023, Mercury say they expect all turbines to be operational by October 2023. The first turbines arrived in April 2023, and were transported to the site during May and June. In July 2023, two of ten turbines had been erected, and the wind farm was expected to be complete by October. By mid October, 8 of 10 turbines were operational and stage 1 of the project was on track to be completed by the end of October. The wind farm was officially opened on 20 November.

=== Stage 2 ===
Mercury is building stage 2 of the project starting in June 2024 with first generation coming on stream by mid-2026 and completion by mid-2027. They are building an additional 155 MW of capacity, generating 525 GWh per year, In June 2023 they received approval to amend their resource consent. This change reduces the total number of turbines for the project from 83 to 66 but allows the remaining turbines to be built with an additional 20 meters of height, a maximum blade tip height of 165m. Mercury say this will help reduce stress on the blades and increase their lifespan.

Construction of stage 2 began in July 2024 and was completed in September 2026.

== Transmission ==
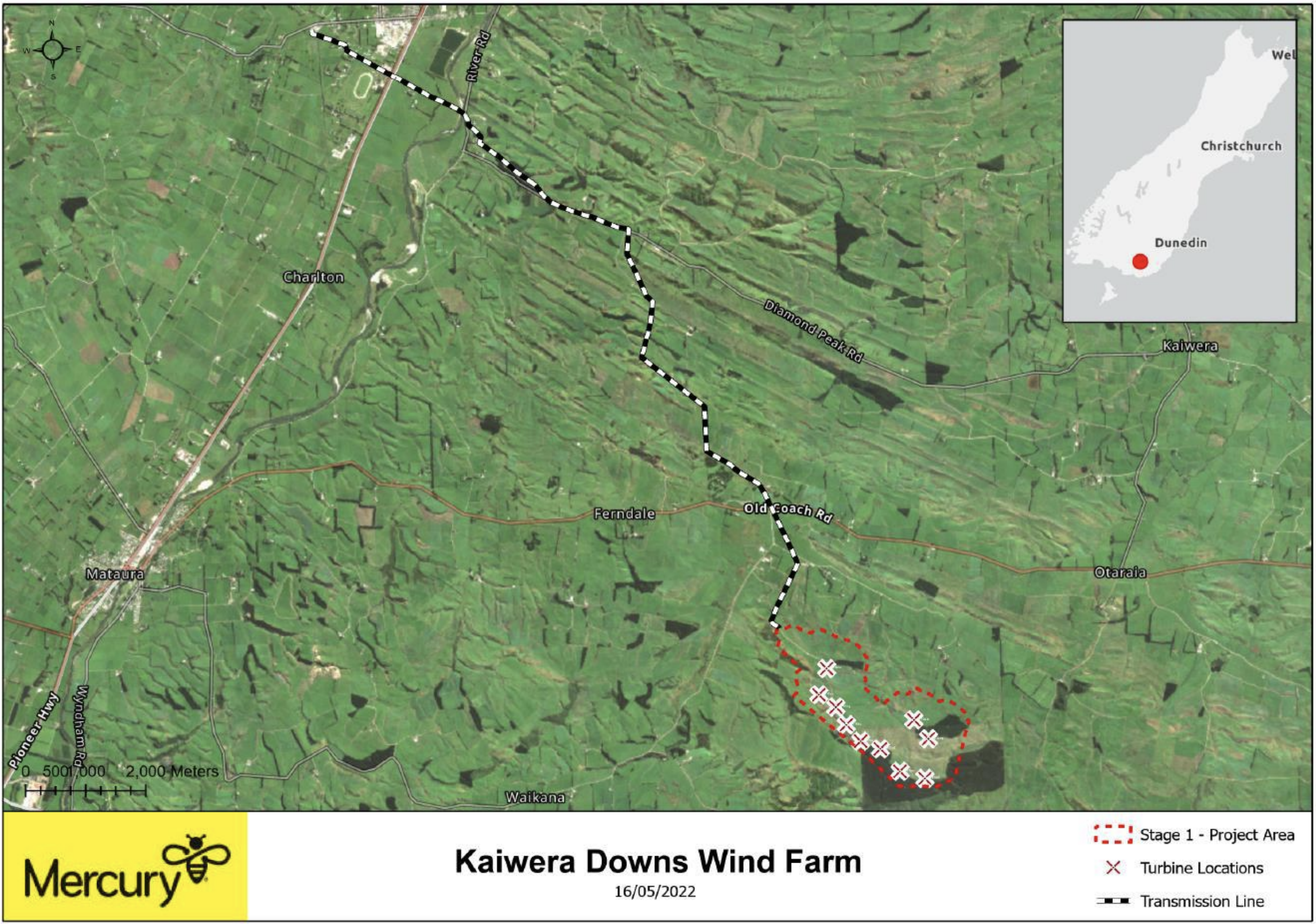
Transmission line route and turbine locations for the Kaiwera Downs wind farm stage 1

Power from Stage 1 is exported via a new 18 km (11 mi) 33,000-volt line to Transpower's Gore substation.

Power from Stage 2 will be exported to the national grid via a short new 220Kv transmission line connecting to Transpower’s North Makarewa to Three Mile Hill Line.

== See also ==
- Wind power in New Zealand
