= Whirinaki, Hawke's Bay =

Whirinaki
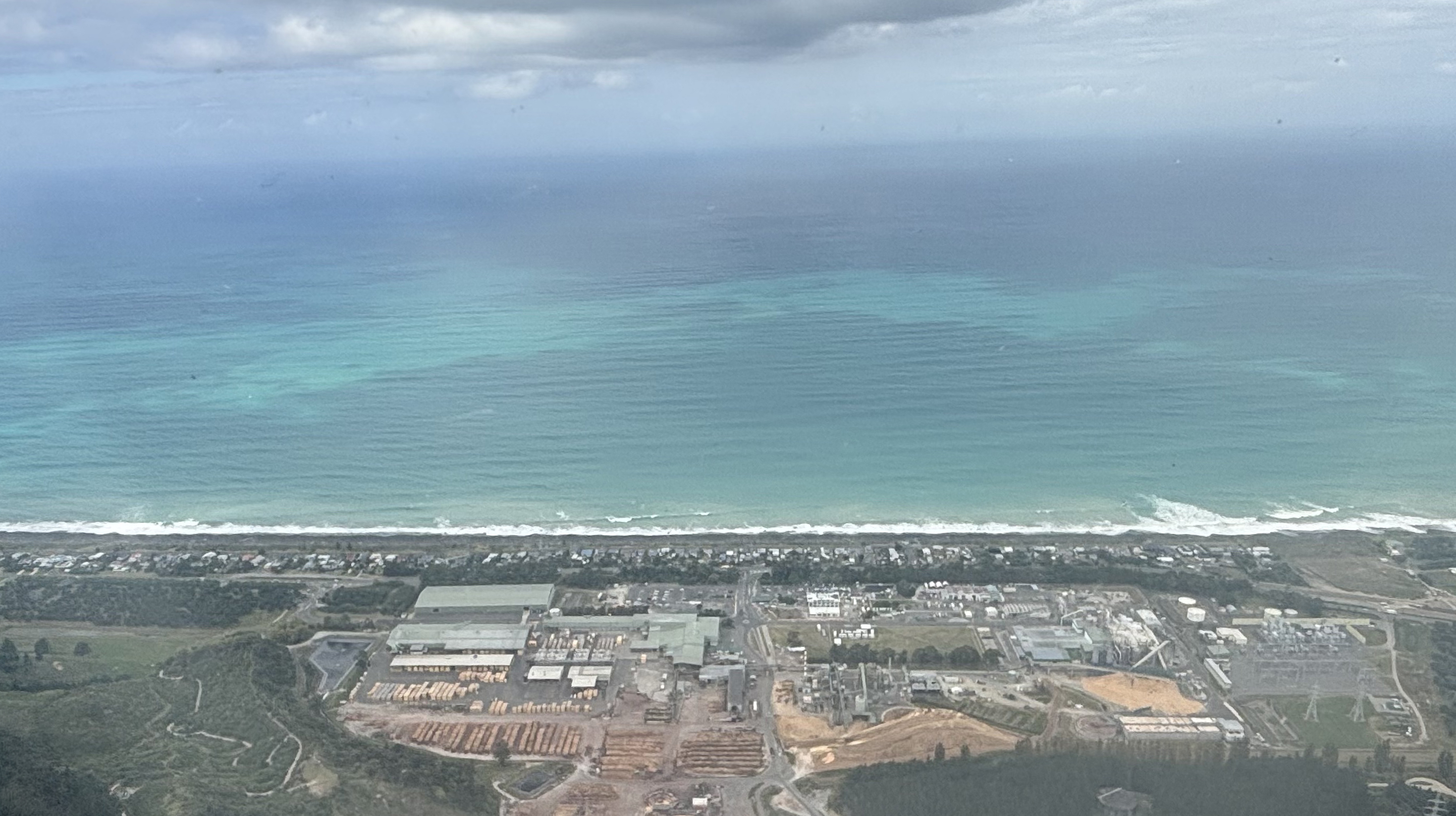
- Aerial view of Whirinaki in March 2026
- Interactive map of Whirinaki
- Coordinates: 39°22′34″S 176°53′36″E
- Country: New Zealand
- Region: Hawke's Bay
- Territorial authority: Hastings District
- Ward: Mohaka General Ward; Takitimu Māori Ward
- Community: Hastings District Rural Community
- Subdivision: Tūtira subdivision
- Electorates: Napier; Ikaroa-Rāwhiti (Māori)

Government
  - Territorial Authority: Hastings District Council
  - Mayor of Hastings: Wendy Schollum
  - Napier MP: Katie Nimon
  - Ikaroa-Rāwhiti MP: Cushla Tangaere-Manuel

Area
  - Total: 1.23 km^{2} (0.47 sq mi)

Population (June 2025)
  - Total: 440
  - Density: 360/km^{2} (930/sq mi)

Whirinaki is a small coastal settlement in Hastings District, in the eastern North Island of New Zealand. It sits just north of the mouth of the Esk River, a few kilometres east of Eskdale and a similar distance north of Bay View, which is part of Napier. It lies on State Highway 2, just north of its junction with State Highway 5.

Pan Pac timber and wood pulp mill, which opened in 1973 and is one of Hawke's Bay's largest industrial plants, is at Whirinaki. The diesel-powered Whirinaki Power Station opened next to the mill in 1978, later closed and then reopened in 2004. Designed to be a standby power station, it has a total capacity of 155 MW and is owned and operated by Contact Energy. A mountain bike park is immediately north of the mill.

Pētane Marae (Note: Written Petāne Marae in some sources.) is in a rural area nearby. It is a meeting place for Ngāti Matepū and Ngāti Whakaari, two hapū (sub-tribes) of the Ngāti Kahungunu iwi (tribe). Te Amiki is the name of the meeting house. In October 2020, the Government committed $6,020,910 from the Provincial Growth Fund to upgrade 19 Hawke's Bay marae, including Pētane Marae. The funding was expected to create 39 jobs.

Pan Pac mill and Pētane Marae were flooded when the Esk River overtopped stopbanks during Cyclone Gabrielle in February 2023.

== Demographics ==
Statistics New Zealand describes Whirinaki as a rural settlement, which covers 1.23 km^{2} (0.47 sq mi). It had an estimated population of 440 as of June 2025, with a population density of 358 people per km^{2}. It is part of the larger Puketapu-Eskdale statistical area.

Historical population
Year	Pop.	±% p.a.
2006	342	—
2013	339	−0.13%
2018	387	+2.68%
2023	462	+3.61%

Whirinaki had a population of 462 in the 2023 New Zealand census, an increase of 75 people (19.4%) since the 2018 census, and an increase of 123 people (36.3%) since the 2013 census. There were 222 males and 243 females in 156 dwellings. 1.9% of people identified as LGBTIQ+. The median age was 52.5 years (compared with 38.1 years nationally). There were 72 people (15.6%) aged under 15 years, 60 (13.0%) aged 15 to 29, 231 (50.0%) aged 30 to 64, and 99 (21.4%) aged 65 or older.

People could identify as more than one ethnicity. The results were 92.9% European (Pākehā); 13.6% Māori; 0.6% Pasifika; 1.3% Asian; 1.9% Middle Eastern, Latin American and African New Zealanders (MELAA); and 2.6% other, which includes people giving their ethnicity as "New Zealander". English was spoken by 99.4%, Māori by 1.9%, and other languages by 3.9%. New Zealand Sign Language was known by 0.6%. The percentage of people born overseas was 16.9, compared with 28.8% nationally.

Religious affiliations were 28.6% Christian, 1.3% Māori religious beliefs, 0.6% Buddhist, 0.6% New Age, and 0.6% other religions. People who answered that they had no religion were 64.3%, and 5.2% of people did not answer the census question.

Of those at least 15 years old, 72 (18.5%) people had a bachelor's or higher degree, 225 (57.7%) had a post-high school certificate or diploma, and 93 (23.8%) people exclusively held high school qualifications. The median income was $49,700, compared with $41,500 nationally. 60 people (15.4%) earned over $100,000 compared to 12.1% nationally. The employment status of those at least 15 was 192 (49.2%) full-time, 48 (12.3%) part-time, and 6 (1.5%) unemployed.
