= One Mile Creek Power Station =

Hydro-electric power station in New Zealand

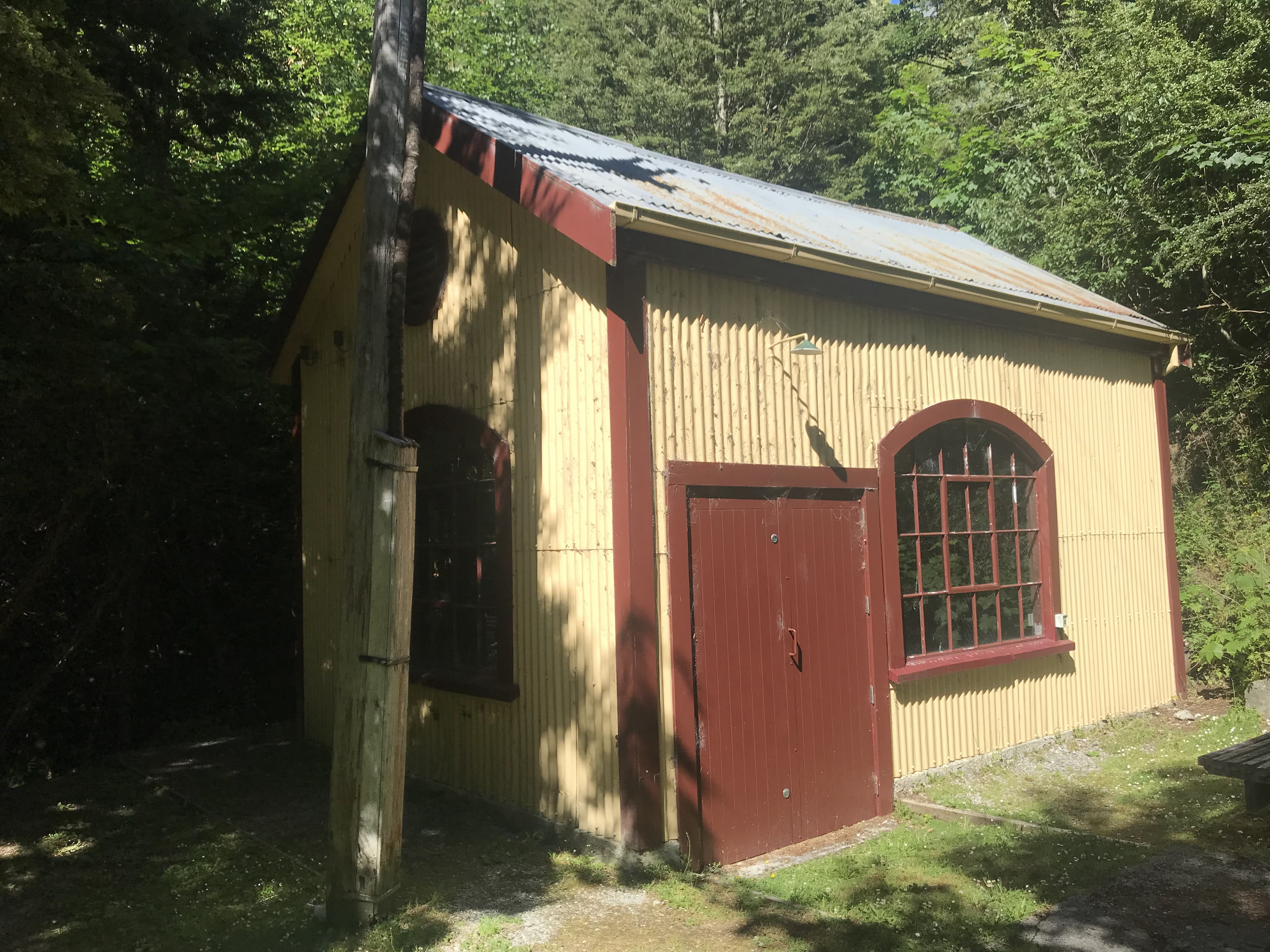
- Powerhouse
- Interactive map of One Mile Creek Power Station
- Country: New Zealand
- Location: Queenstown
- Coordinates: 45°2′11″S 168°38′40″E
- Status: Decommissioned
- Opening date: 18 September 1924

Dam and spillways
- Type of dam: Reinforced concrete arch
- Height: 12 m (39 ft)

Power Station
- Hydraulic head: 150 m
- Turbines: 1 x 60 kW

One Mile Creek Power Station is a former hydro-electric generating station in Queenstown, New Zealand. The power station was commissioned in 1924 to provide electric power for lighting in Queenstown. A re-inforced concrete arch dam was constructed in One Mile Creek to divert water into a penstock that supplied a pelton wheel turbine in a powerhouse constructed near to the shore of Lake Wakatipu. The station was officially opened on 18 September 1924 and operated until 1966 when it was decommissioned. The headworks of the scheme were subsequently used by the Queenstown Borough Council for water supply purposes.

A charitable trust was formed in 2002 to undertake restoration of the building and re-instatement of the generating equipment as a heritage project, and the work was completed in 2005.

The One Mile Creek Walk generally follows the steep route of the penstocks from the powerhouse up to the dam. The walk passes through beech forest that is the closest area of native forest to Queenstown.
