= Cobb Reservoir =

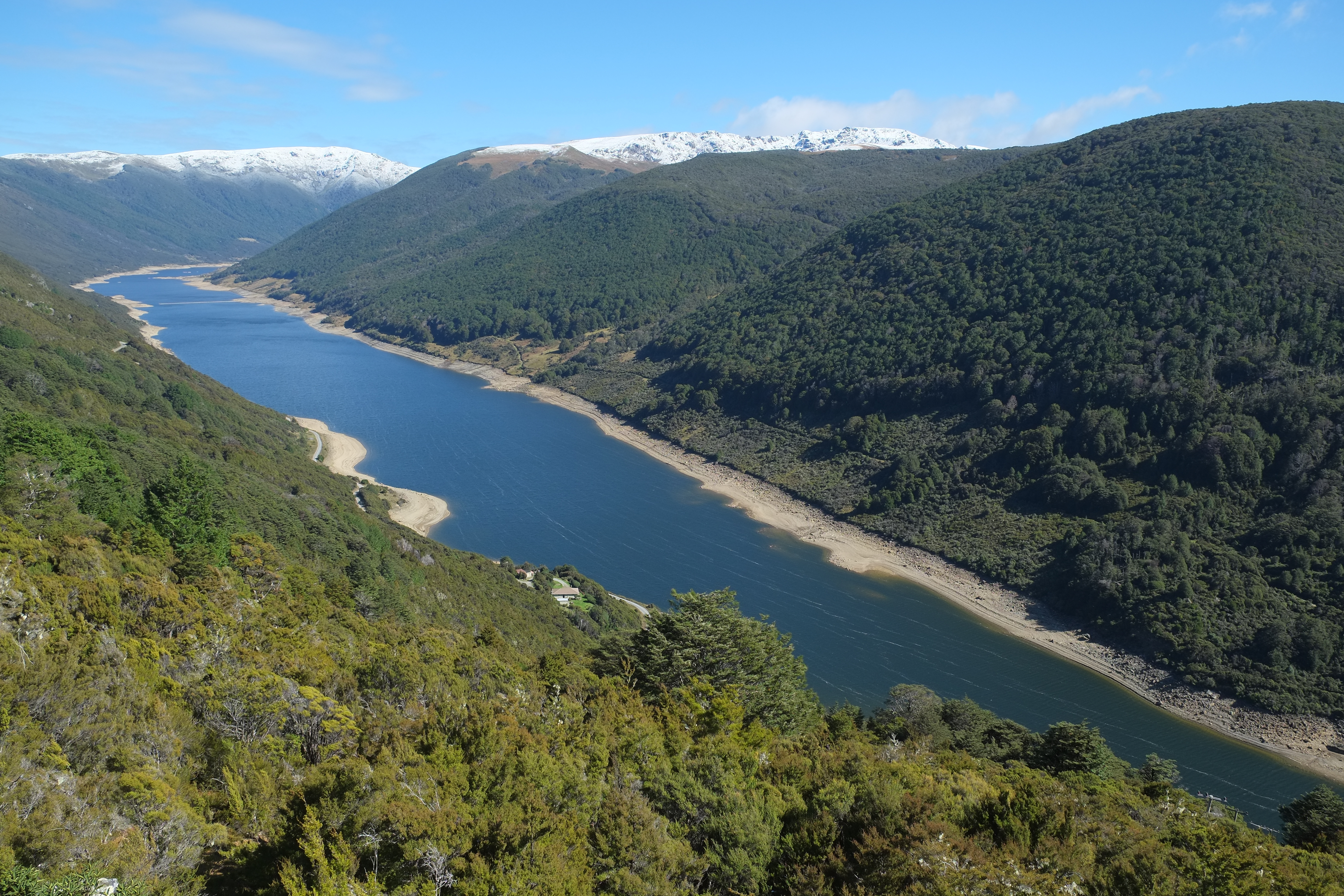
- Cobb Reservoir in autumn
- Interactive map of Cobb Reservoir
- Location: New Zealand
- Coordinates: 41.121014°S 172.657796°E
- Type: reservoir
- Primary inflows: Cobb River
- Primary outflows: Cobb River
- Built: 1949–1954
- Max. length: 6 kilometres (3.7 mi)
- Max. width: 450 metres (1,476 ft)
- Water volume: 25,600,000 m^{3} (900,000,000 cu ft) when full
- Surface elevation: 819 metres (2,687 ft)

The Cobb Reservoir is a hydro storage lake fed by the Cobb River in the Tasman District of the South Island of New Zealand. The reservoir feeds the Cobb Power Station and is 819 metres (2,687 ft) above sea level but drops significantly with low rainfall. Cobb Reservoir is the highest hydro storage lake in New Zealand, and is entirely surrounded by Kahurangi National Park. The reservoir, dam, penstock and powerhouse are excluded from the national park.

The dam that forms the reservoir was built from 1949 to 1954, replacing a smaller structure built about ten years earlier. It is an earth dam 32 metres (105 ft) high by 221 metres (725 ft) long. The geology of the area precluded the construction of a concrete dam.

A narrow winding road leads over Cobb Ridge to Cobb Reservoir and along the lake's shore, providing access to tramping tracks in the area surrounding the valley. The road was built in the 1940s and remains unsealed from Cobb Power Station onwards. The access road to the reservoir is the only road into the interior of Kahurangi National Park.

== Climate ==
Climate data for Cobb Dam, elevation 823 m (2,700 ft), (1991–2020)
Month	Jan	Feb	Mar	Apr	May	Jun	Jul	Aug	Sep	Oct	Nov	Dec	Year
Mean daily maximum °C (°F)	18.4 (65.1)	18.4 (65.1)	16.8 (62.2)	13.9 (57.0)	11.5 (52.7)	8.6 (47.5)	8.0 (46.4)	8.8 (47.8)	10.2 (50.4)	12.5 (54.5)	14.4 (57.9)	16.2 (61.2)	13.1 (55.7)
Daily mean °C (°F)	13.3 (55.9)	13.5 (56.3)	11.8 (53.2)	9.2 (48.6)	6.9 (44.4)	4.3 (39.7)	3.5 (38.3)	4.3 (39.7)	6.0 (42.8)	8.0 (46.4)	9.7 (49.5)	11.6 (52.9)	8.5 (47.3)
Mean daily minimum °C (°F)	8.2 (46.8)	8.5 (47.3)	6.8 (44.2)	4.5 (40.1)	2.3 (36.1)	0.0 (32.0)	−1.0 (30.2)	−0.3 (31.5)	1.7 (35.1)	3.4 (38.1)	5.0 (41.0)	7.0 (44.6)	3.8 (38.9)
Average rainfall mm (inches)	118.1 (4.65)	109.6 (4.31)	175.7 (6.92)	206.5 (8.13)	213.9 (8.42)	198.3 (7.81)	227.6 (8.96)	223.3 (8.79)	197.7 (7.78)	217.7 (8.57)	162.0 (6.38)	180.2 (7.09)	2,230.6 (87.81)
Source: NIWA

== See also ==
- List of dams and reservoirs in New Zealand
