= Pupu Hydro Power Scheme =

Historic power station in New Zealand

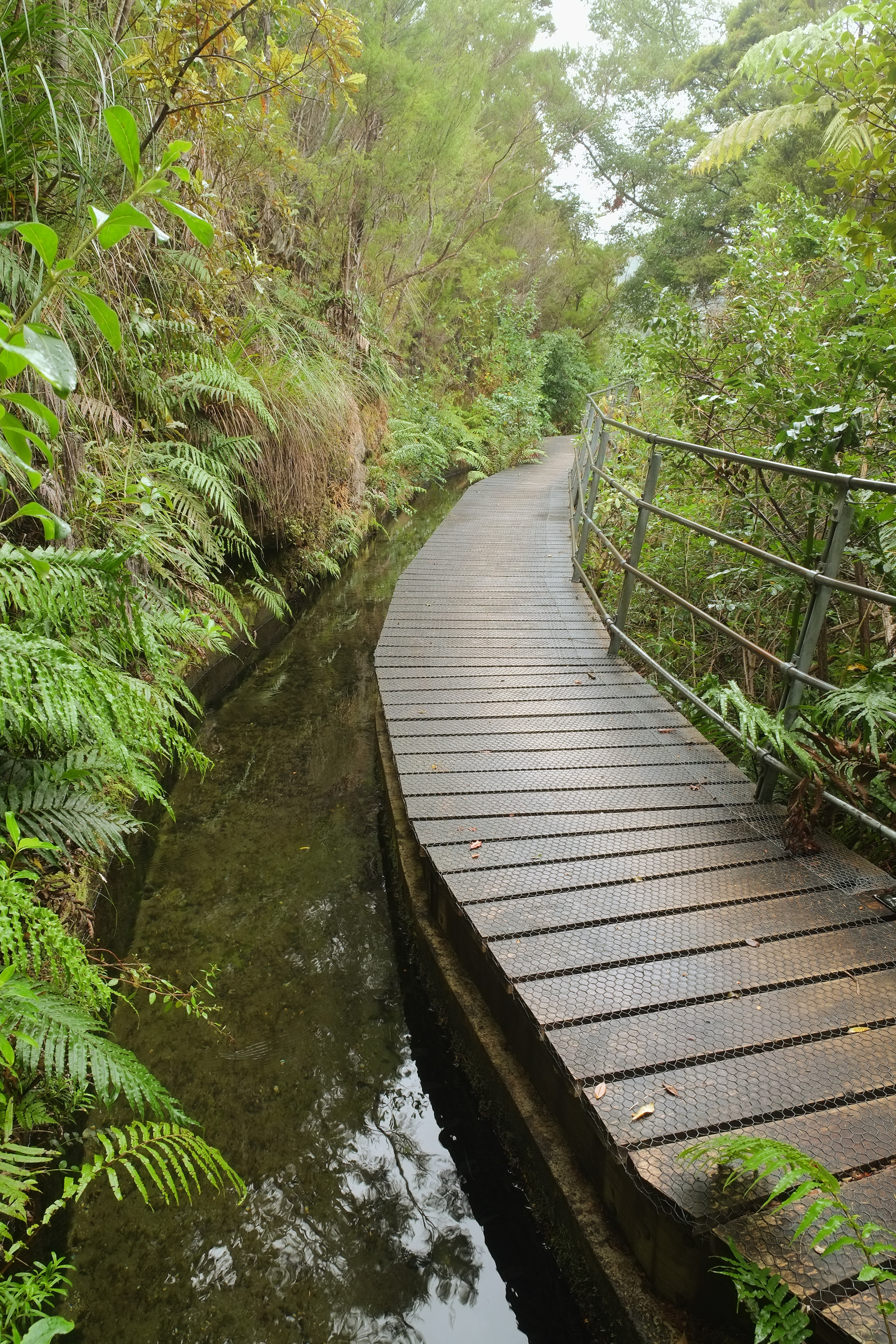
- Pupu water-race diverting Campbell Creek to a penstock
- Interactive map of Pupu Hydro Power Scheme
- Country: New Zealand
- Location: near Tākaka
- Coordinates: 40°51′19″S 172°44′14″E
- Status: Operational
- Opening date: 11 October 1929
- Owner: Pupu Hydro Society Inc

Power Station
- Operator: Pupu Hydro Society Inc
- Type: Run-of-the-river
- Turbines: Boving twin-jet pelton wheel
- Installed capacity: 250 kW (340 hp)
- Annual generation: 1.8 GWh (6.5 TJ)

The Pupu Hydro Power Scheme is a small hydroelectric power station near Tākaka in the Golden Bay region of the South Island of New Zealand. It opened in 1929 as the first power station in the region and was the first public electricity supply in Golden Bay. After closing in 1980 following damage to the generator, the power scheme was fully restored by the local Pupu Hydro Society and many volunteer groups over the course of seven years and re-opened in 1988, again supplying electricity to the national grid.

The scenic Pupu Hydro Walkway follows the historic gold mining water-race between the penstock and the weir at Campbell Creek, before returning along the opposite side of the valley. The track was opened in 2003 and also leads past the power house, where a window provides a view into the turbine room.

== Construction ==
The first water-race was constructed from 1901 to 1902 by the Takaka Sluicing Company over 8 months by a crew of 24 men working 8-hour shifts. It diverted water from Campbell Creek at a gentle gradient along the steep hillside, travelling over several timber aqueducts along its original 3.7 kilometres (2.3 mi) course. The gold claim in the Waikoropupu Valley was worked from the 1850s until around 1910.

Following a public meeting in 1924, an interim power board was formed to investigate the development of a local hydro scheme in response to the increasing promotion of electricity as a new energy source following the 1918 Electric Power Boards Act. The proposed Pupu Hydro Power Scheme was however deemed uneconomical by the central government, and local rate payers voted to take on a loan of £24,000 and proceed with the construction, which involved upgrading the disused Campbell Creek water-race, building a penstock and a powerhouse.

On 11 October 1929, the Golden Bay Electric Power Board officially opened the power scheme, lighting up the first public electricity supply in Golden Bay and enabling households to have access to electric lighting, appliances and radio.

This scheme, and the later Onekaka Power Station, allowed Golden Bay's power generation to be self-sufficient up until 1944, when the much larger Cobb Power Station began generating power into the national grid and the Golden Bay Electric Power Board started taking supply from the main grid.

The Pupu Power Scheme survived as an emergency backup, and apart from lightning strike damage in 1956 continued to operate until 1980 when the alternator stator burned out in a 'flashover' short circuit. By then owned by the Tasman Electric Power Board, one of its linesmen had received instructions to start the generator. The plant had condensation and had previously always been dried out for a fortnight before power generation began. The linesman could not convince his superior that running the plant would be dangerous and upon turning it on, the generator started burning out. After 51 years of operating reliably, the shut down power scheme was put up for tender in 1980.

== Restoration ==
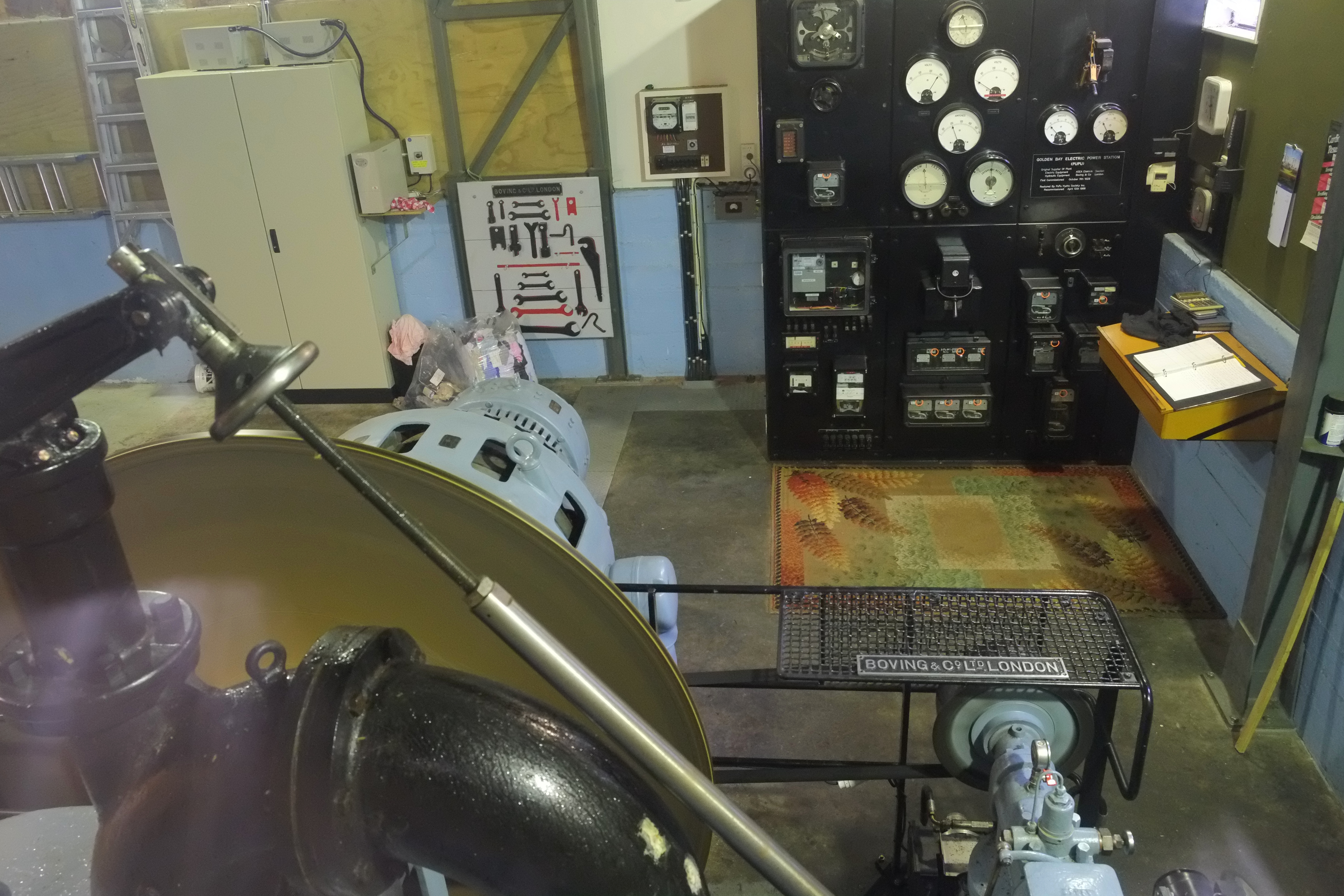
Pupu Hydro Powerhouse turbine room

Following seven years of negotiations from 1981 to 1987, an agreement was signed between the Tasman Electric Power Board and the Pupu Hydro Society to take on a loan and fully restore the Pupu Hydro Power Scheme as a working "museum".

The water race and penstock were partly rebuilt, a motorised filter and new control gates were installed, and a spillway weir was constructed. The powerhouse was renovated and all equipment was either restored, refurbished or replaced. The 250 kVA 400 V alternator from 1929 was rewound and reinsulated by the ASEA New Zealand branch, the original supplier of the generator. The stator pack was completely replaced, control gear and relays were refurbished, and the Boving twin-jet pelton wheel was recast with 24 new buckets.

After completion of the restoration at an estimated total cost of $280,000, and with the strong support from many local groups and volunteers, the fully restored Pupu Hydro Power Scheme was reopened on 10 April 1988 once again as a fully operational hydroelectric power station. According to one of the group's trustees, the Pupu Hydro Power Scheme is the country's largest community-owned power station.

Later in 1991, the Pupu Hydro Society purchased the powerhouse and the surrounding 1 acre (0.4 ha) of land from the Tasman Electric Power Board, and in 2003 finished construction of the loop track.

== Current operation ==
The 107 metres (351 ft) drop from the headpond down the penstock to the powerhouse yields a strong 152 pounds per square inch (1,050 kPa) of water pressure, which is regulated by a valve at the powerhouse. Twin jets of water power the Boving twin-speer pelton wheel with a maximum water flow of 350 litres per second. The alternator is rated at 250 kW and supplies 400 V, stepped up to 11 kV to feed into the main power grid.

Average annual energy output is 1.8 GWh, well up from the original power scheme's 0.8 GWh/year output.

The Pupu Hydro Scheme is listed as an historic site by Heritage New Zealand.

The Pupu Hydro Society continues to provide maintenance of the power scheme, funded by the sale of generated power on the spot-price electricity market. Excess profits go back into various Golden Bay community projects.

== Pupu Hydro Walkway ==
The Pupu Hydro Walkway is a 1.5 to 2 hour loop track starting at the end of the unsealed Pupu Valley Road, past the more well-known Pupu Springs. The walk passes through the mature podocarp and beech forest of Kahurangi National Park, first zig-zagging up to the penstock, and then following the gentle gradient of the historic gold mining water-race along the steep hill side for 1.7 kilometres (1.1 mi) on a narrow boardwalk. The concrete water race and the boardwalk have been restored, including continuous railing on the sections along steep drop-offs.

After reaching the intake weir at Campbell Creek, the track returns via a gravel track on the opposite side of the valley. The Pupu Hydro Powerhouse is a 1-minute walk from the car park, with a viewing window and information panels about the power scheme, its history and restoration.

== See also ==
- Electricity sector in New Zealand
- Hydroelectric power in New Zealand
