= Cobb River (New Zealand) =

River in Tasman District, New Zealand

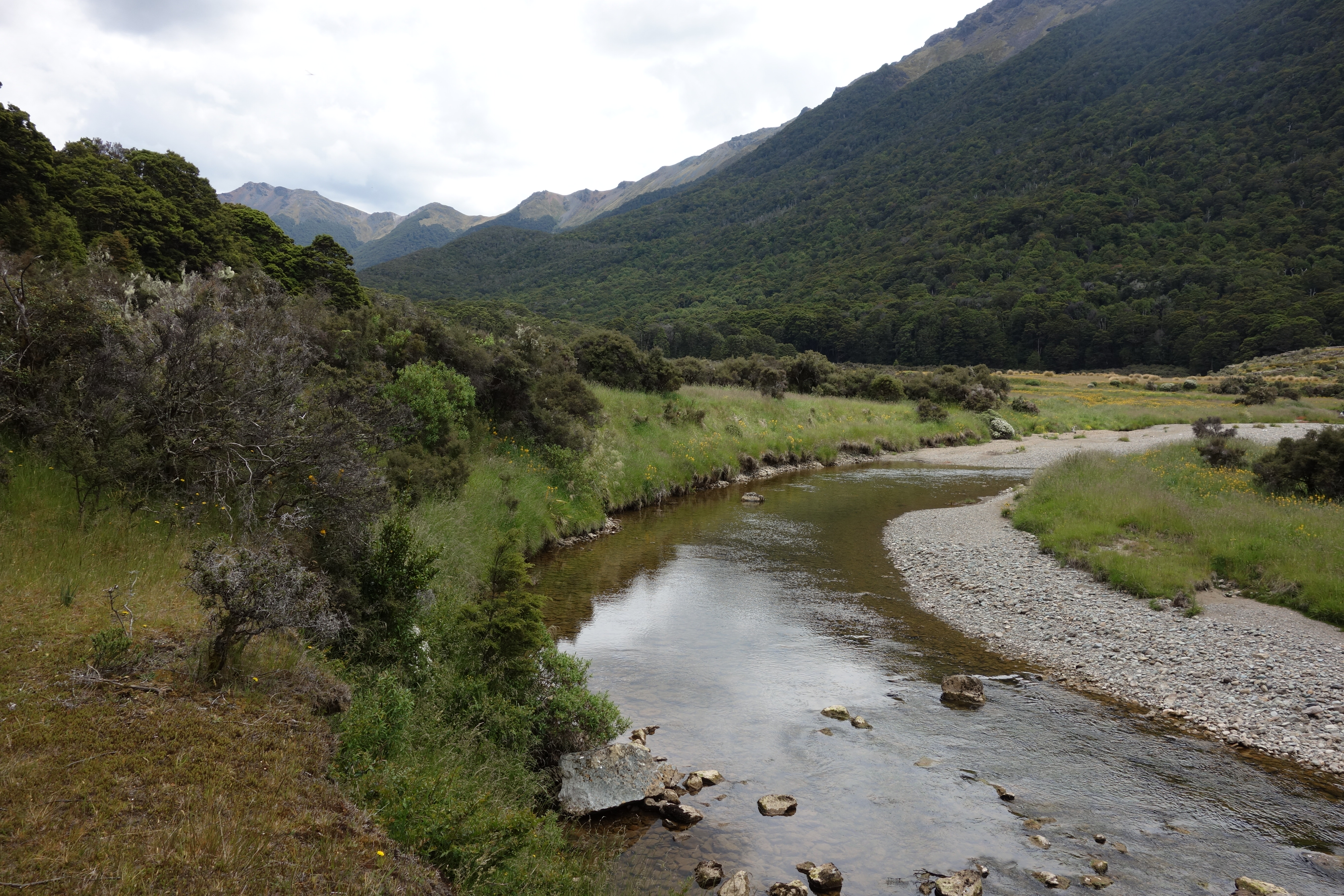
- Looking up the Cobb Valley
- Route of the Cobb River
- Mouth of the Cobb River Cobb River (New Zealand) (South Island)

Location
- Country: New Zealand

Physical characteristics
- Source
  - location: Lake Cobb
  - coordinates: 41°01′23″S 172°33′12″E
  - elevation: 1,090 m (3,580 ft)
- Mouth
  - location: Tākaka River
  - coordinates: 40°52′56″S 172°48′37″E
  - elevation: 220 m (720 ft)
- Length: 26 km (16 mi)

Basin features
- Progression: Cobb River → Tākaka River → Golden Bay / Mohua → Tasman Sea
- Tributaries
  - left: Diamond Lake Stream
  - right: Chaffey Stream, Hannah Creek, Myttons Creek, Thorns Creek, Trilobite Creek, Magnesite Creek

The Cobb River is a river in the Tasman Region of New Zealand. It flows southeast from Lake Cobb on the northern slopes of Mount Cobb, in Kahurangi National Park, in the northwestern South Island. The river's waters are captured behind a dam to become the Cobb Reservoir; the outflow continues to join with the Tākaka River. The river is named for J.W. Cobb, a local mill owner.

Brown and rainbow trout are available for fishing in the river. A tramping track follows the river between Lake Cobb and the reservoir and there are several backcountry huts in the river valley. New Zealand's oldest rocks are found in the Cobb River catchment.

== See also ==
- List of rivers of New Zealand
