= Upper Tākaka =

Locality in Tasman District, New Zealand

- locality
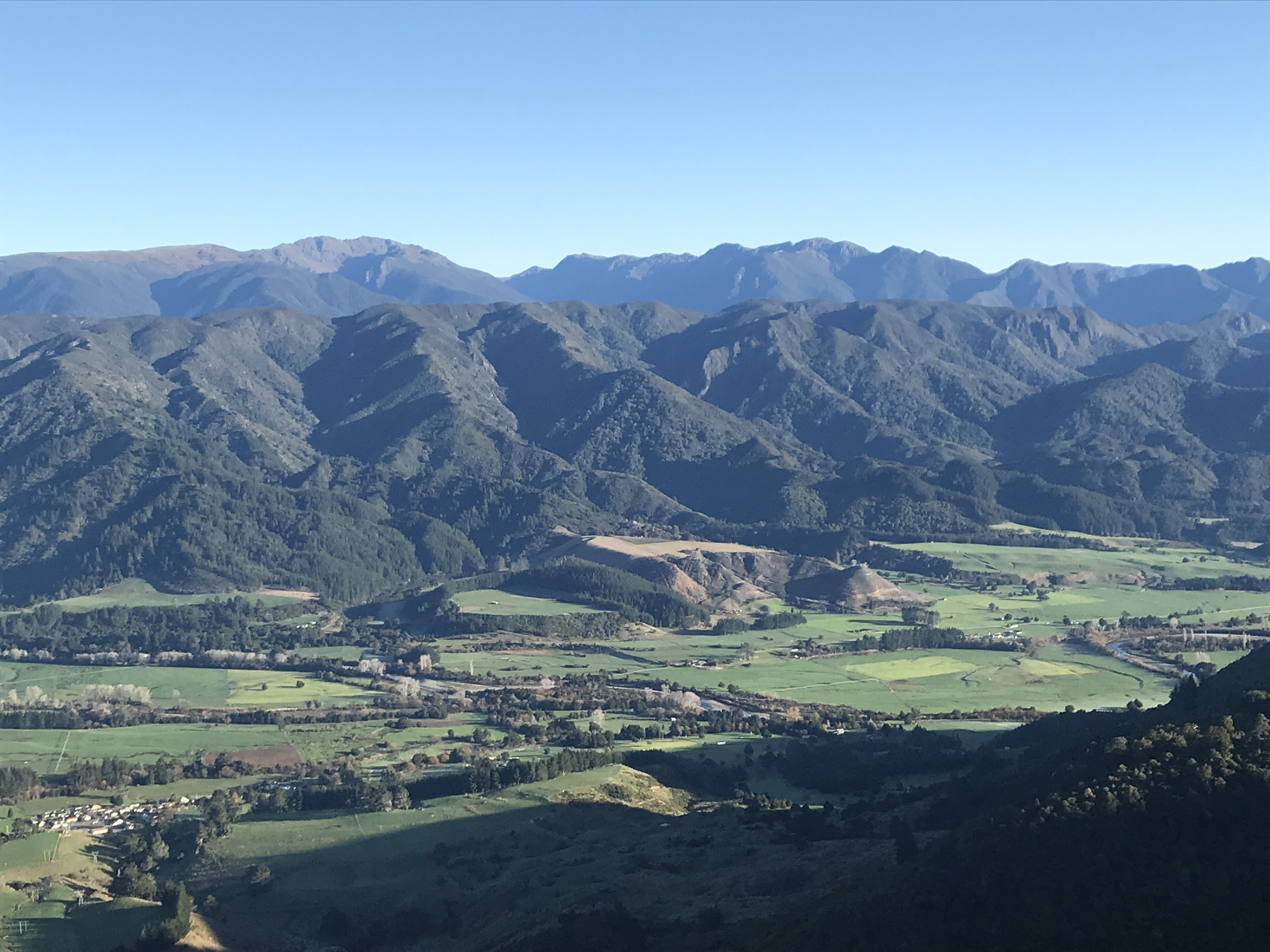
- View of the Tākaka valley from Harwood Lookout on Tākaka Hill, with the settlement of Upper Tākaka bottom left
- Interactive map of Upper Tākaka
- Coordinates: 41.029°S 172.822°E
- Country: New Zealand
- Territorial authority: Tasman
- Ward: Golden Bay Ward
- Electorates: West Coast-Tasman; Te Tai Tonga (Māori)

Government
  - Territorial authority: Tasman District Council
  - Mayor of Tasman: Tim King
  - West Coast-Tasman MP: Maureen Pugh
  - Te Tai Tonga MP: Tākuta Ferris

Area
  - Total: 403.72 km^{2} (155.88 sq mi)

Population (2023 census)
  - Total: 174
  - Density: 0.431/km^{2} (1.12/sq mi)
- Time zone: UTC+12 (NZST)
  - Summer (DST): UTC+13 (NZDT)
- Postcode: 7183
- Area code: 03

Upper Tākaka is a settlement in the Tasman District of New Zealand. It is located in Golden Bay, 20 kilometres (12 mi) south of Tākaka.

Located near the head of the Tākaka valley, Upper Tākaka is on State Highway 60, at the western end of the Tākaka Hill road. The settlement is home to a major electrical substation, upgraded by lines company Network Tasman in 2016, consisting of the installation of new 66/11 kV transformers, at a cost of $1.95 million. The area suffered a decline from 1987, first with the closure of Upper Takaka School, and then a fire that razed the Rat Trap Hotel. The local hall is now the centre of community life in Upper Tākaka.

== Demographics ==
Upper Tākaka locality, which includes Uruwhenua, covers 403.72 km^{2} (155.88 sq mi). It is part of the larger Golden Bay / Mohua statistical area.

Historical population
Year	Pop.	±% p.a.
2006	189	—
2013	168	−1.67%
2018	159	−1.10%
2023	174	+1.82%

Upper Tākaka had a population of 174 in the 2023 New Zealand census, an increase of 15 people (9.4%) since the 2018 census, and an increase of 6 people (3.6%) since the 2013 census. There were 96 males, 75 females, and 6 people of other genders in 81 dwellings. 5.2% of people identified as LGBTIQ+. The median age was 44.0 years (compared with 38.1 years nationally). There were 27 people (15.5%) aged under 15 years, 30 (17.2%) aged 15 to 29, 81 (46.6%) aged 30 to 64, and 39 (22.4%) aged 65 or older.

People could identify as more than one ethnicity. The results were 94.8% European (Pākehā), 6.9% Māori, and 1.7% Pasifika. English was spoken by 96.6%, Māori by 1.7%, and other languages by 8.6%. No language could be spoken by 1.7% (e.g. too young to talk). The percentage of people born overseas was 15.5, compared with 28.8% nationally.

Religious affiliations were 15.5% Christian, 1.7% New Age, and 1.7% other religions. People who answered that they had no religion were 74.1%, and 8.6% of people did not answer the census question.

Of those at least 15 years old, 30 (20.4%) people had a bachelor's or higher degree, 90 (61.2%) had a post-high school certificate or diploma, and 36 (24.5%) people exclusively held high school qualifications. The median income was $34,700, compared with $41,500 nationally. 9 people (6.1%) earned over $100,000 compared to 12.1% nationally. The employment status of those at least 15 was 72 (49.0%) full-time, 33 (22.4%) part-time, and 3 (2.0%) unemployed.

== Education ==
Upper Takaka School opened in 1883 and closed in 1990.
