= Pan Pac Forest Products Ltd =

Company in New Zealand

Coordinates: 39.378°S 176.890°E

Pan Pac Forest Products
- Industry: Forestry, timber products
- Founded: 1971
- Headquarters: Whirinaki, Hawke's Bay, New Zealand
- Key people: Tony Clifford, managing director
- Owner: Oji Holdings
- Website: www.panpac.co.nz

Pan Pac Forest Products Ltd is a forest products company based at Whirinaki, near Napier, New Zealand. The company includes forestry operations, manufacturing and sales of wood pulp and lumber products, employing approximately 360 staff. Originally majority-owned by a New Zealand company and producing mechanical pulp, it is now wholly owned by a Japanese company and producing thermo-mechanical pulp.

== Company ==
Pan Pac was established by Carter Consolidated Ltd, an Auckland-based, family-controlled timber company that was founded in 1896, and a predecessor to Carter Holt Harvey. In 1967, the company started researching ways to utilise timber waste from its forestry and sawmill operations, which were largely around Auckland and the central North Island. They learnt of a strong demand in Japan for mechanical pulp and began to investigate producing it for export to Japan. It became apparent that to be economic a pulp mill would need to produce 400 tonnes a day, requiring more wood than the company could provide from waste. This meant that cutting rights to a forest were needed, and a sawmill would be required to process the millable timber.

When 320 million cubic feet of timber from the government-owned Kaingaroa Forest was offered for sale in 1969, Carter Consolidated bid for all of it. They won cutting rights to 220 million, the remaining 100 million going to Tasman Pulp and Paper.

A joint venture agreement was signed between Carter Consolidated Ltd, Oji Paper Company and Kokusaku Pulp on 3 May 1971, forming Carter Oji Kokusaku Pan Pacific Ltd.

Pan Pac was established as an international joint venture between Carter Consolidated (holding 60%) and the two Japanese partners (holding 40%). In 1991 Carter Holt Harvey sold their share in Panpac down to 10% to raise capital for cutting rights to Hawke's Bay forests. In March 1993, Carter Holt Harvey sold the last of their investment and Pan Pac became wholly Japanese owned, with 87% held by Oji Paper Company and 13% by Nippon Paper Industries Company Ltd. In 2007, Pan Pac became 100% Oji owned.

== Mill ==
The mill was built in Hawke's Bay, rather than closer to Kaingaroa Forest, partly because it was expected that Hawke's Bay forests could later supply wood. Another factor was that Napier's port was the closest one to Kaingaroa Forest, being nearer than the Port of Tauranga. Whirinaki was selected as the site because it had the Esk River for a large water source. Construction began in 1971 and was completed 18 months later in March 1973 at a cost of $12 million. It was officially opened by Prime Minister Norman Kirk in June that year. The pulp mill had a capacity of 400 air dried tonnes (ADT) per day.

Stage 2 development was undertaken 1974–1976 at a further cost of $12 million. It included a chip screening system, a new chipper and conveying, four refiners, dewatering machines, another flash drier and slab press, two bale presses and a wrapping system. This lifted production to 600–700 ADT per day.

In the early 1980s, market forces necessitated a change in product, and between 1981 and 1982 the mill was converted from mechanical pulp to thermo-mechanical pulp for a budget of $30 million. Five refiners were added, three chip pre-heaters and two chip washes. The initial refiners were converted to 'secondaries'.

A 36 MWth boiler was installed in 2002 and a new chipmill was built in 2009.

Today the pulpmill and sawmill are supported on-site by a chipmill, two boilers and a cogeneration plant.

== Production ==
Pan Pac produces 220,000 tonnes of pulp annually, which is exported to Japan. Approximately 200,000 m^{3} of timber is produced annually.

== Cyclone Gabrielle ==
On 14 February 2023, at around 4:30 - 5 am, the Pan Pac site was hit by Cyclone Gabrielle as water rushed from the Esk Valley and into Whirinaki. Managing Director Tony Clifford, said that the site would have many, many months of recovery.
