= Waitaki Dam =

Dam in South Canterbury, New Zealand

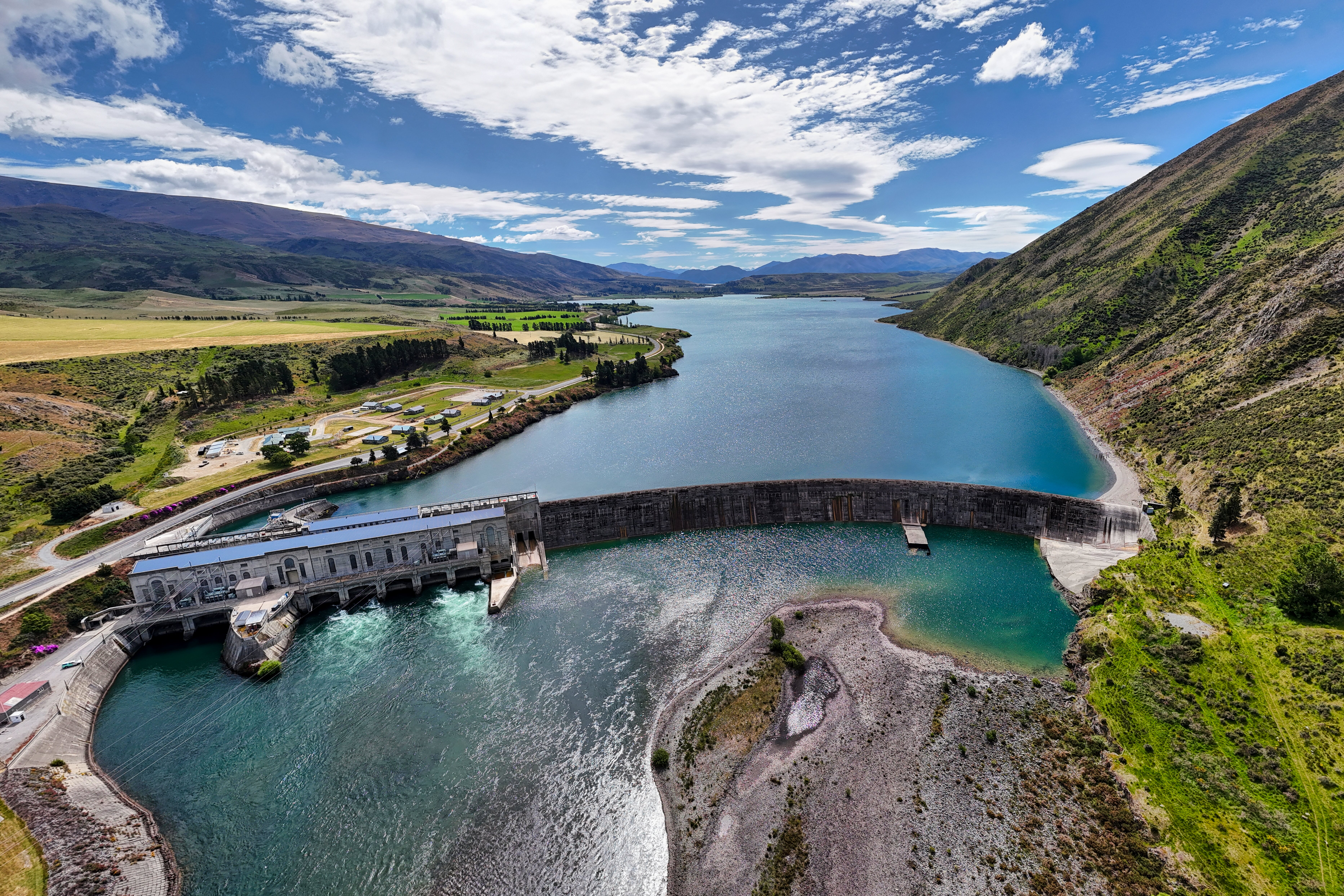

- Waitaki Hydro Station
- Location: Canterbury Region, New Zealand
- Coordinates: 44°41′25″S 170°25′35″E
- Purpose: Power
- Status: Operational
- Construction began: 1928
- Opening date: 27 October 1934
- Construction cost: $9,540,000 (in 1961)
- Built by: Public Works Department
- Designed by: Public Works Department (with input from Per Hörnell)
- Owner: Meridian Energy
- Operator: Meridian Energy

Dam and spillways
- Type of dam: Gravity dam
- Impounds: Waitaki River
- Height (foundation): 48 m (157 ft)
- Height (thalweg): 33 m (108 ft)
- Length: 542 m (1,778 ft)
- Width (base): 44.2 m (145 ft)
- Dam volume: 214,075 m^{3} (7,560,000 ft^{3})

Reservoir
- Creates: Lake Waitaki

Power Station
- Pump-generators: 7 × 15 MW
- Installed capacity: 105 MW
- Annual generation: 500 GW·h

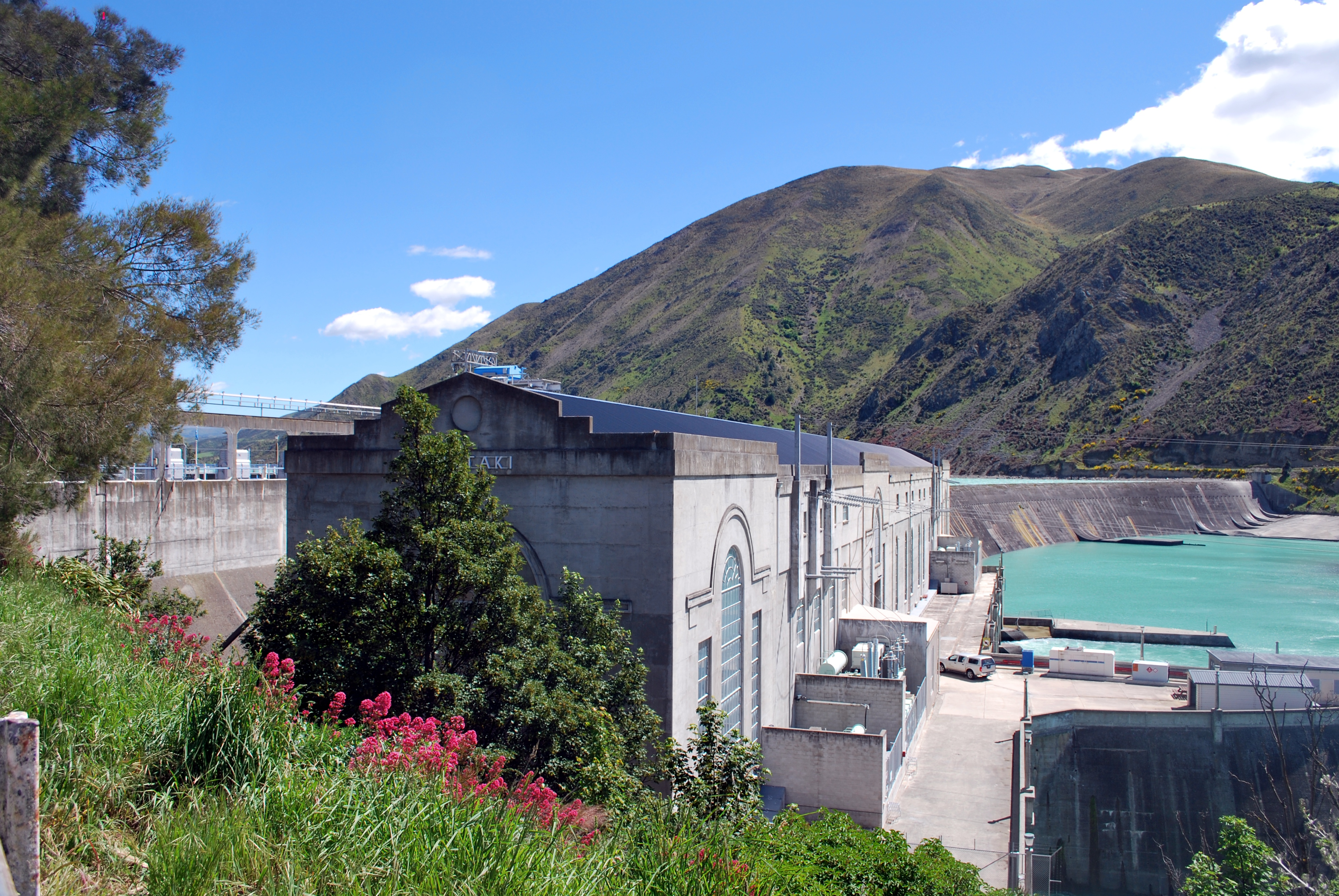
Waitaki Hydro Station

The Waitaki Dam is one of eight hydroelectric power stations which form the Waitaki hydroelectric scheme on the Waitaki River in the Canterbury Region of New Zealand. The dam was the first of three to be built on the Waitaki River and was constructed without earthmoving machinery; over half a million cubic metres of material was excavated, almost entirely by pick-and-shovel. The Waitaki Dam's construction was followed by the development of Aviemore Dam and Benmore Dam, and importantly, every dam built in New Zealand since the Waitaki has benefited from lessons learned during its construction.

The Waitaki Dam is unique; its construction lead to the germination of one of the world's first social welfare systems. Built during the Great Depression, the Waitaki Dam attempted to soak up unemployment as part of the Government's make work scheme and saw the trial of medical welfare where an individual could build a satisfactory life without fear of the inability to cope with age or poverty.

Initial construction of the dam began in 1928 and was completed in 1934 with full power being delivered from two 15 MW generators on 1 January 1935. Three additional generators were added between 1940 and 1949 and a further two generators were added between 1952 and 1954. With seven generators each delivering 15 MW, the total generative output of the Waitaki Dam is 105 MW.

== Background ==
The first State-built power station in New Zealand was constructed at Lake Coleridge in 1915 – designed to supply Christchurch and any additional consumer demand within reach of the transmission system. Consumers quickly tapped into this low-cost energy and the year-on-year load increase for Coleridge was 15%; by the 1920s a new power source was needed.

The Waitaki River was selected as the most promising source of hydro-electric power, particularly for long-term needs – the New Zealand government having recognised the electricity generation potential of the Waitaki Valley as early as 1904. With Lakes Ōhau, Pukaki and Tekapo controlling 80% of the flow into the Waitaki River's headwaters, flooding was not expected to exceed 5380 cumecs, a low threat to the safety of any proposed dam. In its middle reaches, the Waitaki River flows through bedrock gorges of low-grade schists, meta-greywackes and greywackes of the Rakaia Terrane. These gorges offered good dam sites with relatively stable rock upon which to build. The Waitaki River was also sparsely populated in the early 1920s meaning that resettlement would be a very minor issue following inundation by the dam's reservoir.

=== Site selection ===
Initial site investigations began in 1925 and would take over two and a half years before a final site was selected. The focus by 1927 was in the vicinity of Wharekuri/Roseneath (between Aviemore and Waitaki dams) which appeared to be most favourable. However, the presence of coal on the Otago side (south) of the Waitaki River was of concern to engineers who felt it may act as a leak point beneath any proposed dam. Subsequently, a site further downstream, near the confluence with the Awakino River, was investigated and found to be suitable. The Awakino site, 6 km (3.7 mi) above Kurow, had only 5 m (16 ft) of shingle to remove before solid basement was reached, reducing the overall volume of material to be excavated. The final site (Awakino) having been selected for the Waitaki Dam was announced by the Government in April 1928, with an overly ambitious target for completion by 1931. The investigations of the Roseneath site were not in vain either – Roseneath would later be adopted as the site of the Aviemore Dam.

Engineers calculated that the Awakino site, backed-up by several years of Waitaki River flow records, (Note: The average flowrate of the Waitaki River at the Waitaki Dam is 358.5 m^{3}/s (12,660 cu ft/s) based on data from 1927–2004.) would support a station generative capacity of 75 MW, although initially only two 15 MW generators and turbines were ordered.

=== Dam design ===
Schematic sections through the Waitaki dam (Figure A) and power station (Figure B). Redrafted from Natusch (1988).

Early designs of the dam, in large part due to the infancy of hydroelectric engineering in New Zealand, had potentially serious flaws. In particular, there was no consideration of the pressure exerted by the hydrostatic head and impact of water entering cracks or joints in either the basement or the dam itself. The downstream slope of the dam was also considered too steep compared to European dams at a ratio of 3:2. Seepage troubles at the North Island's Arapuni Power Station in 1929 caused additional concerns and resulted in a Swedish hydroelectric engineer, Professor Per Hörnell, being brought to New Zealand in 1930. While Professor Hörnell was specifically brought in to consult on remediation measures to be made at Arapuni, he also visited several other hydroelectric sites, including Waitaki. Despite most column inches at the time focussing on the exorbitant £4000 consultant's fee charged by Professor Hörnell, his comments on the Waitaki were that its cross section was too narrow and that measures should be incorporated to ensure adequate foundation drainage. Notwithstanding the Government's decision not to invest in a specific Waitaki Dam report from Professor Hörnell, several design modifications were made on the basis of his comments:

- The base of dam was widened and the slope of the dam reduced (where it had not already been constructed by this point in 1930)
- A new gallery (a horizontal passage) was added on the upstream face at the dam's base, forcing drainage from the lower levels of the dam and the foundations into it and then pumped to the downstream face of the dam
- Concrete cut-offs on both the downstream toe of the dam and upstream base around the new gallery were also implemented to further inhibit water penetration into the dam's foundations

Despite these additions, Professor Hörnell was not completely satisfied and his last communication with the Minister of Public Works was to disclaim any responsibility for any future troubles that might occur. Nevertheless, his visit to Waitaki had the significant result of introducing New Zealand engineers to the problem of dealing with water under pressure within the actual structure of a dam.

Concern over the possibility of uplift forces on the base of the dam has persisted: further measures to alleviate this issue were introduced in the early 1960s when anchoring cables were drilled from the dam crest into the foundation rock, and again in 2016 when drainage holes were drilled in the foundation of the dam.

=== Geology ===
The Ahuriri, Ōhau, Pukaki and Tekapo rivers rise in glaciated catchments which feed the Waitaki River. These tributaries flow from the Mackenzie Basin into Lake Benmore before forming the Waitaki River. Several bedrock gorges, separated by small tectonic basins, lie beneath the string of artificial lakes (Benmore, Aviemore, Waitaki) occupying the middle reaches of the fault-controlled Waitaki Valley. Downstream of Kurow, the valley widens to a plain, with paired alluvial terraces on either side of a braided river channel. At the Waitaki Dam, the Waitaki River occupies a fault-angle depression between the greywacke of South Canterbury and the schist of North Otago. The valley fill comprises a sequence of Quaternary river and glacial outwash gravels that overlies Upper Tertiary sedimentary strata, which in turn overlies the Mesozoic basement.

Both basement and covering sediments have been affected by late Quaternary faulting, including reactivation of earlier Cretaceous fault systems. Geodetic results indicate that strain rates in the lower Canterbury region are low to very low, though strain increases considerably toward the west and proximity with the Alpine Fault. The Waitaki region, along with the rest of the south-eastern South Island, has had a low level of large earthquake occurrences in historic times, with one of the largest recorded earthquakes (M5.8) in the vicinity of the Waitaki Dam occurring near Oamaru in 1876. Paleoseismic studies on individual faults in the Waitaki area suggest that the recurrence interval of large earthquakes is on the order of thousands or tens-of-thousands of years. The primary fault associated with the Waitaki Dam is the Dryburgh Fault; this fault has been noted as having a considerably long recurrence interval of >62 000 years. While the impacts of regional faulting at the time of the dam's construction were not well understood, the Dryburgh Fault was recognised as an issue, particularly when excavating the Hörnell Gallery. Basement rock had been reduced to gouge across the fault zone which was remediated by excavating and successfully cementing the gouge zone deeper than the competent rock either side of the fault.

== Construction ==
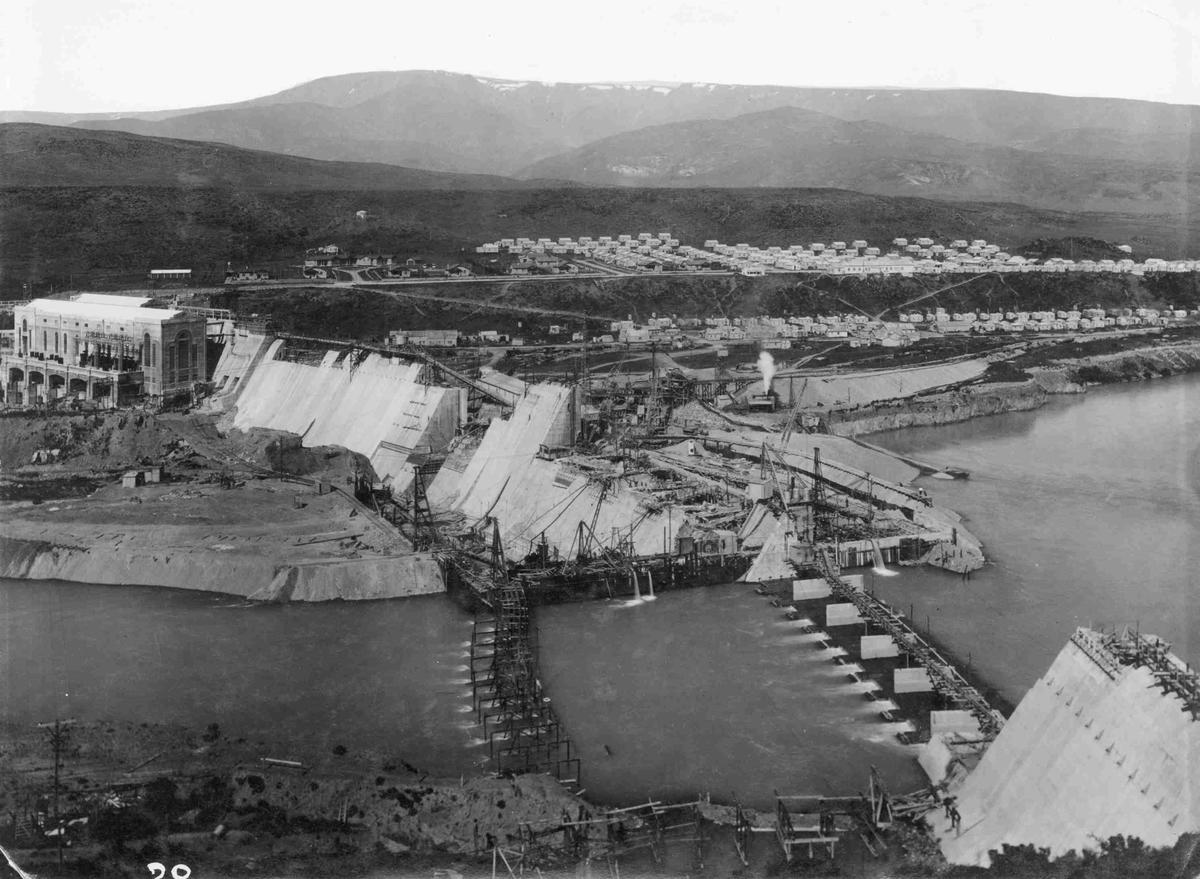
Construction of the Waitaki dam (c. 1930), taken from the true left bank of the Waitaki River, looking towards Waitaki temporary village. The power station is at the far left.

When the final Awakino site was selected for the dam, the Public Works Department engaged Roland Packwood as the District Engineer in charge of the dam's construction. Packwood's task was to get the power station operational as quickly as possible and involved the completion of the dam across the Waitaki River followed by installation, testing and commissioning of the electrical and mechanical equipment. Given an overly ambitious goal of an operational power station by 1931, it soon became obvious that such a rapid completion was unrealistic.

Packwood's first task was to extend a spur from the Kurow Branch railway line to the dam site – a simple 6 km (3.7 mi) extension which was approved and surveyed in August 1928, with Public Works Department traffic operating on the line by December 1928. With the railway and the existing gravel road from Kurow (SH83) providing equipment and material access, the project was able to start in earnest.

=== Lake Waitaki village ===
Before any major works at the Waitaki site were undertaken, a camp was required to accommodate up to 1000 workers in addition to their families (up to 2000 people in total). The harsh climate of the Waitaki Valley with its cold winters and strong winds, plus the long-term nature of the project, meant the Public Works Department opted for more permanent wooden accommodation in favour of their typical use of canvas tents. Senior staff were allocated houses built of concrete blocks which would become permanent staff quarters in the future, while junior staff and single men were accommodated in wooden houses and huts. In all, the Public Works Department were to construct approximately 350 houses and another 700 huts which were primarily located on two river terraces on the true right river bank (south or Otago-side of the river) immediately upstream of the dam. There were four separate living areas in the wider camp: the main camp occupied the upper terrace, 'Siberia' was located on the lower river terrace (so-named because it was exposed to the cold winds), 'Geddesville' was located downstream from the construction site, and 'Willows', located close to the Awakino bridge. In addition to accommodation, the camp included a YMCA hall, post office, small shops, tennis courts and a football ground.

At the dam's completion, the camp was dismantled apart from the permanent structures of Lake Waitaki village which were occupied by the permanent dam staff. When the Electricity Corporation of NZ (ECNZ) moved its staff out in the 1980s, the remaining concrete block houses, hostel and environs were threatened with demolition. However, pressure from the community resulted in a heritage covenant with Heritage New Zealand to protect the village as a historic area in 1995. After passing through several owners it went up for sale in 2015 but languished unsold for several years. Interest in purchasing Lake Waitaki village was rejuvenated in 2018, when global media outlets caught hold of the story that a village was up for sale.

Lake Waitaki village now serves as accommodation for vacation rentals.

=== Dam construction ===
Dam construction began with a trellis bridge being erected across the river and completed in December 1928. This enabled the construction of several cofferdams so that the foundations of the dam could be excavated and concrete subsequently poured. The construction of the first cofferdam was a narrow dam section in the centre of the river. This was followed by the cofferdam on the Canterbury (north) side of the river and restricted the Waitaki's flow by about half leading to half of the trellis bridge being swept away during a flood in early 1929. The trellis bridge was repaired allowing the construction of eleven temporary sluice gates to control river flow during construction of the remainder of the dam.

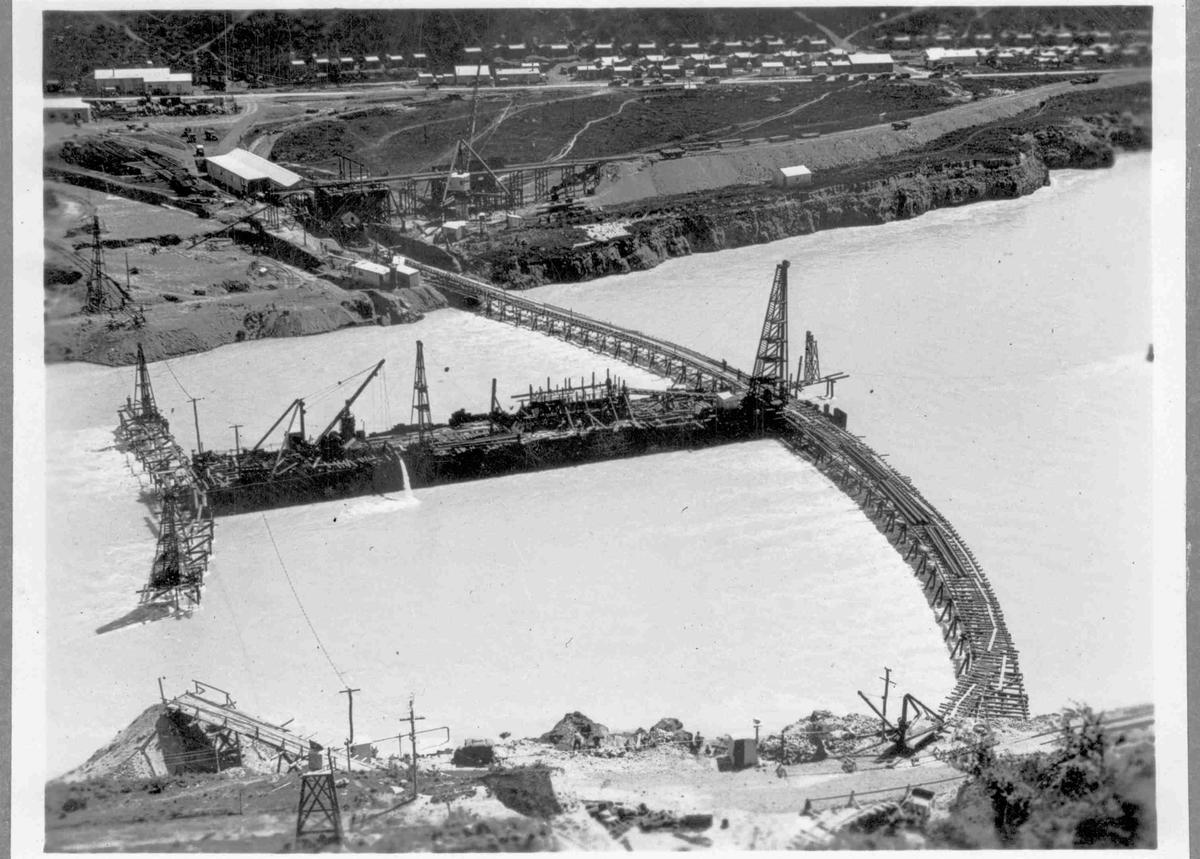
Trellis bridge across the Waitaki River, (12 December 1929).

Excavation began near the Otago abutment for the powerhouse and intake section of the dam with overburden stripped and necessary blasting of rock. Blast-holes were hand-drilled using a gad (digging bar) and sledge hammer. Men did most of the overburden stripping and loading by hand-shovel, but used an Osgood dragline when the excavation was from deeper water. The lack of heavy earthmoving equipment during the dam's construction meant that pick, shovel and wheel barrow were commonly used, although trucks run on light railways around the dam site were used extensively.

Construction of the dam used concrete formed from river gravel aggregate. Concrete was poured into a series of blocks that varied in length, but averaged about 50 ft (15m). Construction continued at pace until 3 February 1931 when flooding caused considerable delays. The Depression forced a reduction in workforce which further hampered construction. Workers were reduced from 1230 in December 1930 to 1000 in early 1931 and further reduced to about 500 in June 1932. The Depression also reduced the demand for power making completion of the dam less critical, but this was reversed in 1933 when power demand began to increase once again. The Government re-engaged as many unemployed men as possible, increasing the workforce to 900 in early 1934; this number was steadily reduced from August 1934 as the dam's construction reached completion.

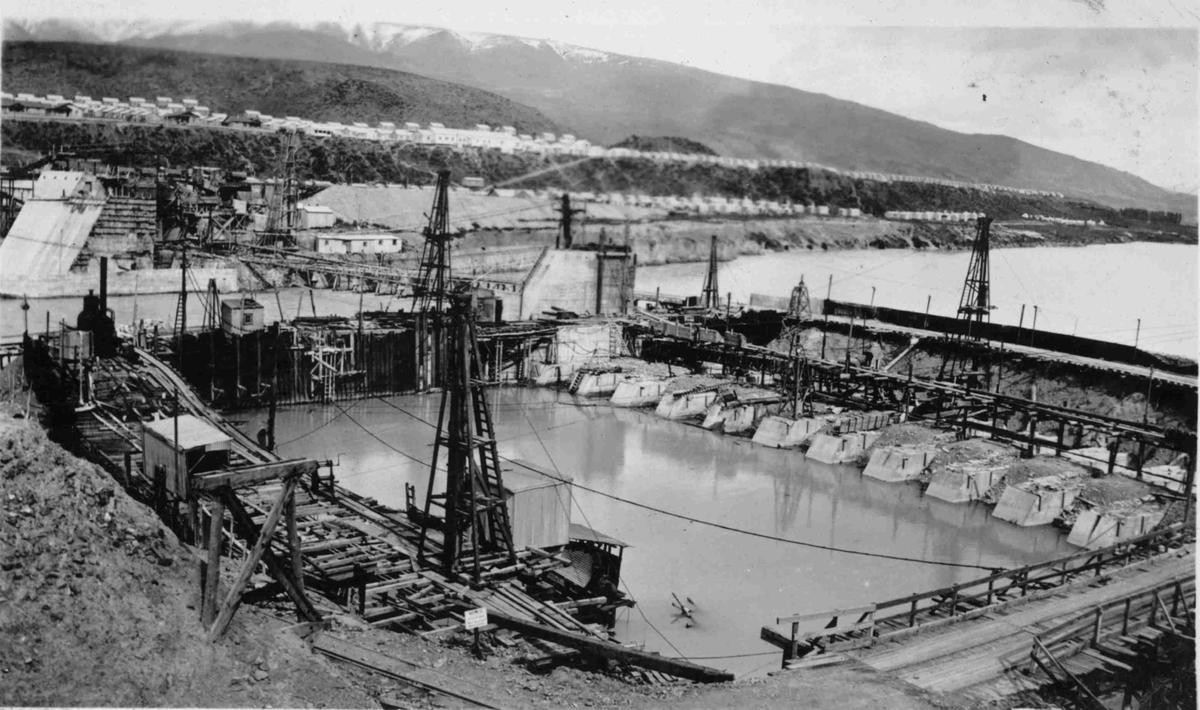
Canterbury cofferdam and temporary sluices (early 1932).

=== Completion and opening ===
As the dam neared completion (the last of the dam's concrete blocks was poured in mid-June 1934), closure and concreting of the temporary sluice gates began in July 1934. The last sluice gates were not lowered until September 1934, although not without incident – the gates breaking their supporting beams as they were lowered. Despite the last three sluice gates not having stopped head pond water flowing past them completely, the dam continued to fill, finally overtopping the weir on 28 September 1934. The completed dam had been constructed with 175,850 m^{3} (6,210,000 ft^{3}) of concrete in the primary superstructure, plus an additional 38,225 m^{3} (1,349,900 ft^{3}) of concrete for the powerhouse.

Construction of the powerhouse had proceeded synchronously with the dam. The vast majority of the plant to be installed in the powerhouse was constructed overseas due to the lack of specialised manufacturing capability within New Zealand at the time. The installation of the first two turbines and generators (20,000 hp each) was completed by the end of 1933, and the wiring testing and commissioning in 1934.

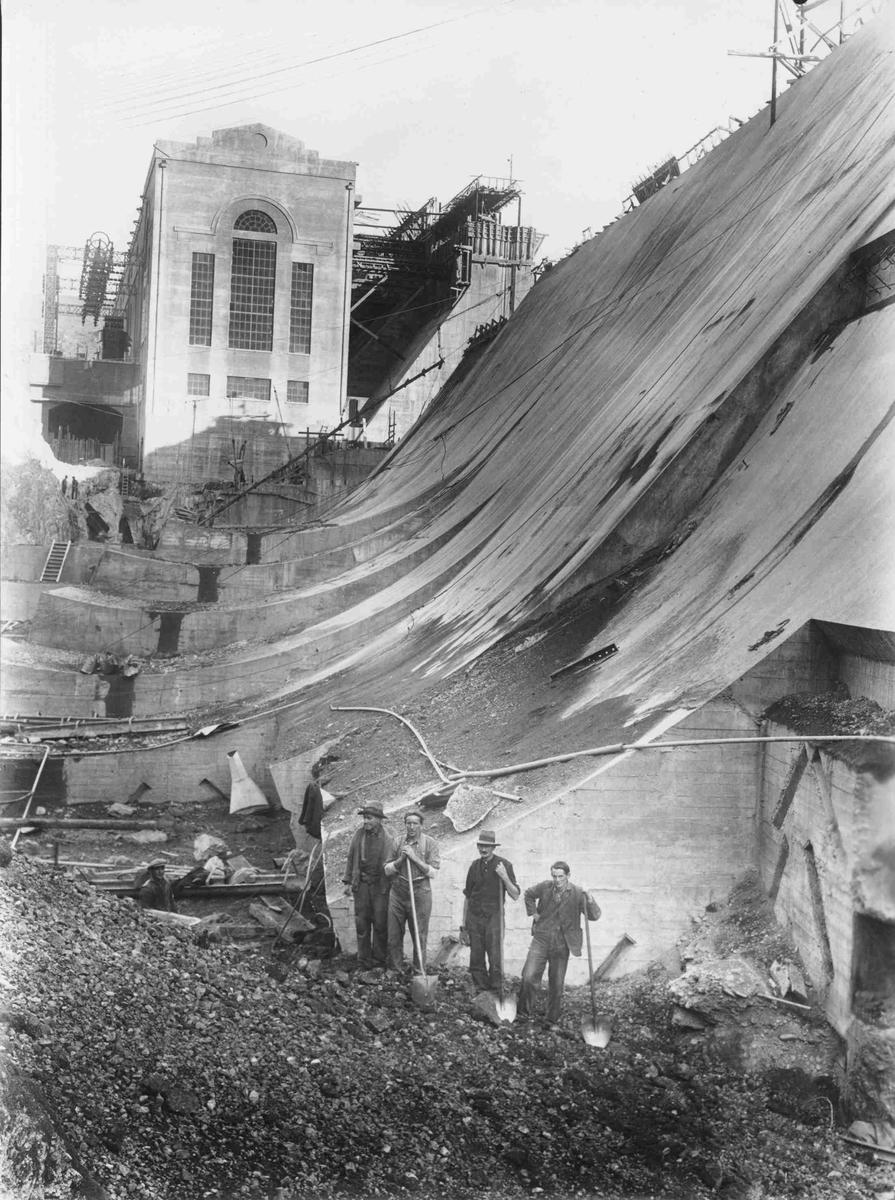
Waitaki dam and power house during construction of Otago side of dam (c. 1933).

The Waitaki dam was officially opened on the 27 October 1934 by the Governor-General Lord Bledisloe. In attendance with Lord Bledisloe was the Prime Minister, George Forbes, the Minister of Works and local MP, John Bitchener and Leader of the Opposition, Michael Joseph Savage. The opening extended to some 300 invited guests who were seated for lunch in the powerhouse – an easy accommodation given only two of the proposed five generators were installed at the time. The official 'switching on' of the power was not possible as testing had not proceeded to the point at which a turbine had been tested and commissioned. Instead, when the Governor-General threw the switch, lamps in the powerhouse were slowly lit using power from Coleridge. The turbines were tested and commissioned with full power being turned on 1 January 1935.

Finalisation work on the dam continued through to July 1935 with sealing of the temporary sluice gates and removal of most of the framework supporting the earlier construction of the dam. The final damaged sluice gates would not be finally sealed off until 18 September 1936 when the water levels were low enough to ensure the sluices could be completely blocked.

== Operation ==
With the reservoir filled, the Waitaki dam has a hydrostatic head of 21 m (69 ft). The initial implementation of two turbines and generators limited the dam's operational output to 30 MW (15 MW per generator). In 1935 this was sufficient to supply half of the South Island's energy requirements. Three additional generators were added between 1940 and 1949 and a further two generators were added between 1952 and 1954. During the phase of work to add the final two generators, the powerhouse was extended from 109 m (358 ft) length to its present length of 152 m (499 ft) to accommodate the new generators. A new inlet and outlet channel were constructed at the same time.

With seven generators each delivering 15 MW, the total generative output of the Waitaki Dam is 105 MW.

== Specifications and statistics ==
=== Power station ===
Average annual energy output	500 GW·h
Station generating output	105 MW
Number of generating units	7
Net head	21 m
Maximum tailrace discharge	? m^{3}/s
Turbines	7 × Francis type, 15 MW made by ?
Generators	7 × 11 kV, 15 MW, made by ?
Transformers	?

=== Civil engineering ===
Powerhouse	152 m length, 45 m width, 40 m height
Dam length	354 m
Dam height	37 m
Penstocks	3 × ? m long

== Upgrades ==
Following the installation of the seventh and final generator in 1954, the Waitaki power station had seen no further major upgrades until 2013. Starting in April 2013, a four-year $40 million refurbishment of the Waitaki power station was undertaken by Meridian Energy. After almost eighty years of continuous operation, part of the refurbishment project saw the drilling of drainage holes in the foundation of the dam to relieve the hydrostatic pressure first raised as a concern by Professor Hörnell in 1930. The station's No. 3 generation unit was also recommissioned during this time: the generator's stator, the single largest component at 120-million tonnes, seized in 1998 and proved uneconomic to return to service at the time. Strengthening of the powerhouse building roof was also undertaken to ensure it could withstand a major earthquake.

Meridian Energy envisages a further phase of upgrades worth $90 million being required to replace four of the station's original generation units.

== Social security ==
Worker safety during the construction of the Waitaki Dam was very limited. Nine men were reported to have died during the construction of the dam; (Note: The nine men who lost their lives during the construction of the dam are commemorated on a plaque at the dam. They were: George Hoffman, John Harold Woodgate, Edwin John Solomon, William Falls, George Todd, John Muir, James Russell, George Roy McLeod and Alexander McKerrow.) three men died in accidents related to the use of heavily laden trucks on the dam's steeply-inclined sections of light railway, while another three drowned in the river. Accidents were extremely prevalent – in one year alone, 540 cases of injuries were reported, although the severity of these injuries is unknown. By way of comparison and considering a worker population of approximately 1000 at Waitaki, the incidence rate of all injury claims in New Zealand was 87 claims per 1000 full-time equivalent employees in 2022.

=== Birthplace of the New Zealand's social welfare system ===
In Public Works Department camps large-enough to warrant it, a medical association with resident doctor and/or nurse would be supplied. At the start of the Waitaki Dam project, the camp numbers did not justify a resident nurse so the doctor's surgery at Kurow was used. On 1 November 1928, the Waitaki Hydro Medical Association was formed in agreement with Kurow's doctor to provide a general service to members of the Association and their families for a small subscription. The doctor for much of the project was Gervan McMillan, a young idealist who worked tirelessly for the Association and was to play an integral role in the development of the social welfare system trialled at Waitaki. McMillan, along with Arnold Nordmeyer, Kurow's Presbyterian Minister, and Andrew Davidson, the headmaster of Kurow School, all had to deal with problems stemming from the Depression. All three were deeply concerned with the problems of health, family, unemployment with its consequent poverty, and old age. Between them, they drafted a system where any individual could build a life without excessive fear of disaster or inability to cope with such problems that may occur during their lifetime.

When McMillan and Nordmeyer entered Parliament in 1935 as Cabinet Ministers, they brought with them their draft for a social security system. This was adopted as the basis for New Zealand's national social welfare scheme, which was implemented in 1939 by the Savage Government.

The construction of the Waitaki Power Station therefore played an important role in the origin of New Zealand's present Social Security system.

== Bibliography ==
- Martin, J. E. (Ed.). (1991). People, Politics, and Power Stations: Electric Power Generation in New Zealand, 1880–1990. Bridget Williams Books. ISBN 9780908912162
- Natusch, G. G. (1984). Waitaki Dammed. And the Origins of Social Security. Dunedin, NZ: Otago Heritage Books. p. 64. ISBN 0959772308
- Nordmeyer, A. (1981). The Waitaki: The River and its Lakes. The Land and its People. Upper Hutt, NZ. Waitaki Lakes Committee. ISBN 0473000806
