= Ōhau River (Canterbury) =

River in the South Island of New Zealand

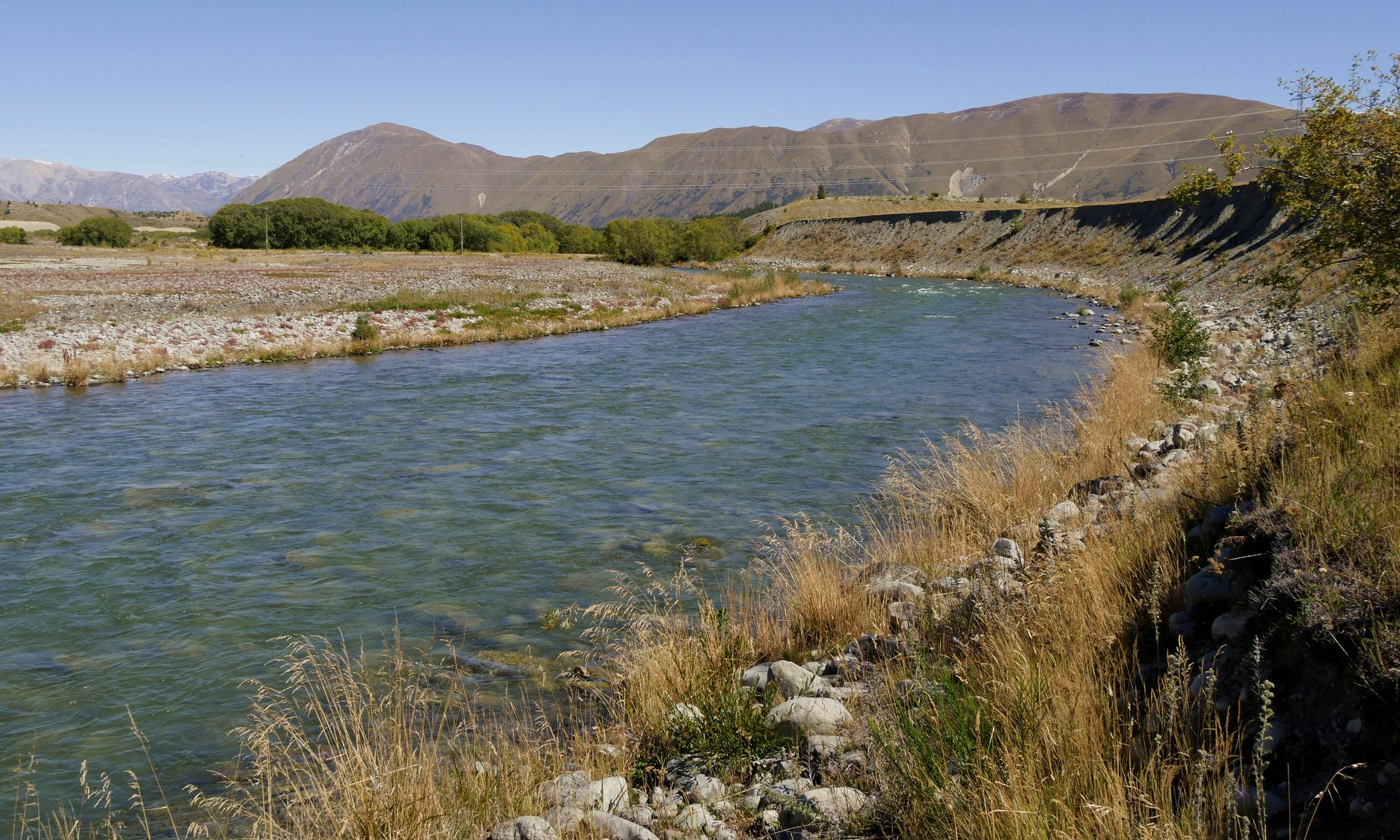
- Ōhau River upstream of Lake Ruataniwha

Location
- Country: New Zealand

Physical characteristics
- Source: Lake Ōhau
  - coordinates: 44.2851°S 169.9365°E
  - elevation: 540 metres (1,770 ft)
- Mouth: Lake Benmore
  - coordinates: 44.3441°S 170.2048°E
  - elevation: 380 metres (1,250 ft)
- Length: 27 km (17 mi)

Basin features
- Progression: Lake Benmore→ Lake Aviemore→ Lake Waitaki→ Waitaki River→ Pacific Ocean
- Tributaries
  - left: Twizel River
  - right: Wairepo Creek
- Waterbodies: Lake Ruataniwha

The Ōhau River is a river in the Mackenzie Basin of New Zealand's South Island. It is the primary outflow of Lake Ōhau, from which it flows in a roughly eastward direction until reaching the artificial Lake Benmore after a distance of roughly 27 kilometres (17 mi). In 1981, the artificial Lake Ruataniwha was created along the river's length to power a small hydroelectric power station as part of the Waitaki hydro scheme. Prior to the creation of the Waitaki hydro scheme, the river flowed directly into the Waitaki River rather than through a series of lakes. The river forms part of the traditional boundary between Otago and Canterbury regions.

Prior to European settlement of the region, the river was a traditional mahinga kai (food gathering site) for Māori travelling through the Mackenzie Basin, providing valuable food sources such as weka, tuna (eels), and pora (Brassica rapa subsp. sylvestris).
