= Tekapo River =

River in the South Island of New Zealand

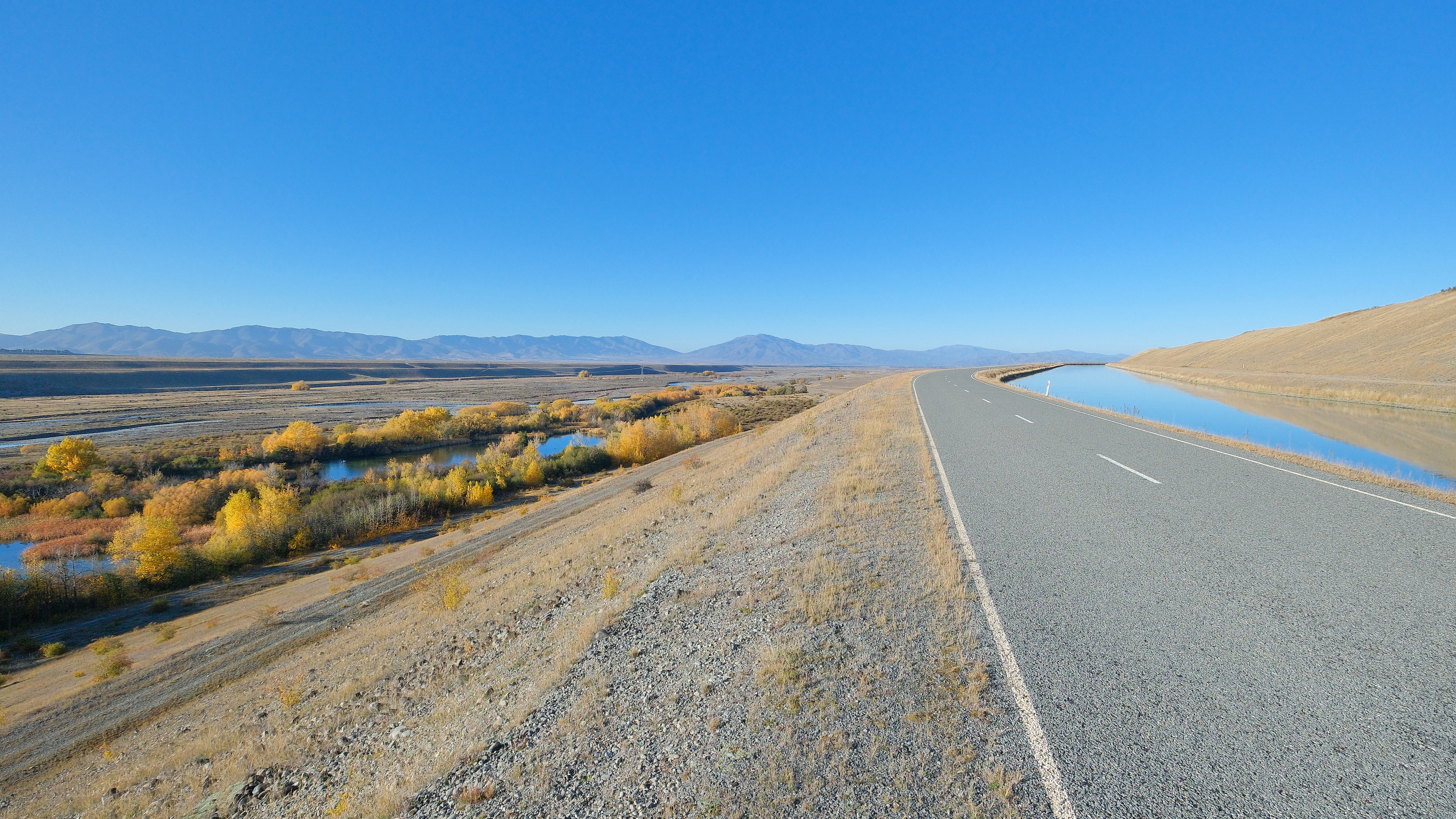
- Tekapo River on the left with little water flow, Tekapo Canal on the right

Location
- Country: New Zealand

Physical characteristics
- Source: Lake Tekapo
  - coordinates: 44.0026°S 170.481°E
  - elevation: 710 metres (2,330 ft)
- Mouth: Lake Benmore
  - coordinates: 44.3441°S 170.2048°E
  - elevation: 380 metres (1,250 ft)
- Length: 25 km (16 mi)

Basin features
- Progression: Lake Benmore→ Lake Aviemore→ Lake Waitaki→ Waitaki River→ Pacific Ocean
- Tributaries
  - left: Grays River
  - right: Pukaki River

The Tekapo River flows occasionally through the Mackenzie Basin, Canterbury, in New Zealand's South Island, although the riverbed is now often dry in the upper reaches. It maintains a constant flow below the confluence of several tributaries, notably the Maryburn, Forks, and Grays rivers.

The lower reaches (below the Maryburn confluence) are popular with anglers chasing brown and rainbow trout, although recent infestation by the invasive algae didymo (Didymosphenia geminata) has somewhat limited angling opportunities.

Originally, the river flowed southwest for 25 kilometres (16 mi) from the southern end of Lake Tekapo before joining with the Pukaki River and flowing into the northern end of Lake Benmore.

However, the water from Lake Tekapo is now diverted via a canal to Lake Pukaki as part of the Waitaki hydroelectric scheme. These lakes are used to store water, and occasionally during a particularly heavy snow melt or if the power stations or canal need servicing, water may spilt from either the dam or canal back into the riverbed.

These events are much anticipated by kayakers, to the extent that they have been known to re-shape parts of the riverbed to create "better" rapids.

In 2020, there were warnings of potential water spill. Normally, its summer maximum level is set at 709.8 meters above the sea level whereas it reached 709.9m at one point.
