= Ahuriri River =

River in the South Island of New Zealand

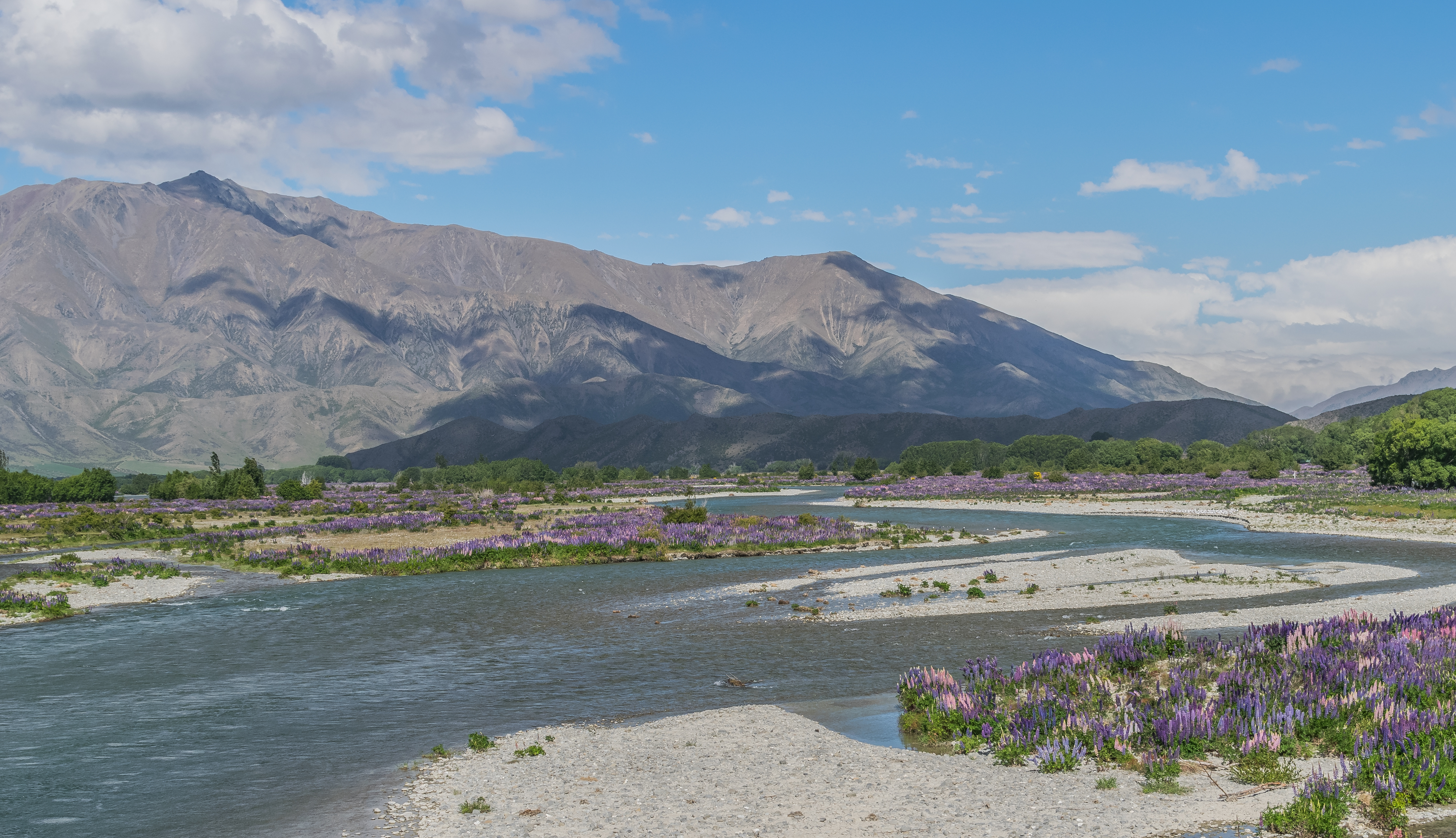
- The Ahuriri River near Omarama

- Location of the Ahuriri River
- Etymology: From te reo Māori, unclear etymology

Location
- Country: New Zealand
- Region: Canterbury
- District: Mackenzie Country

Physical characteristics
- Source: Mount Huxley
  - location: Southern Alps / Kā Tiritiri o te Moana
  - coordinates: 44.0835°S 169.678°E
  - elevation: 1,600 metres (5,200 ft)
- Mouth: Ahuriri Arm, Lake Benmore
  - location: Mackenzie Basin
  - coordinates: 44.509°S 170.054°E -->
  - elevation: 370 metres (1,210 ft)
- Length: 70 kilometres (43 mi)

Basin features
- Progression: Lake Benmore→Lake Aviemore→Lake Waitaki→Waitaki River→Pacific Ocean
- River system: Waitaki River system
- Tributaries
  - left: Canyon Creek, Avon Burn, Longslip Creek, Omarama Stream
  - right: Hodgkinson Creek, Snowy Gorge Creek, Ahuriri River East Branch, Quail Burn
- Bridges: Ahuriri Bridge (State Highway 8

The Ahuriri River is a river in the Canterbury and Otago Regions of the South Island of New Zealand.

The headwaters are on the eastern flanks of the Southern Alps. The river flows for 70 kilometres (43 mi) through the southernmost part of the Mackenzie Basin before reaching the Ahuriri Arm of Lake Benmore, one of the lakes in the Waitaki hydroelectric project. From there, the waters join with those of the Waitaki, which has its outflow in the Pacific Ocean.

Much of the upper portion of the river is in the Ahuriri Conservation Park, and it is a well-regarded fly fishing river, supporting both brown and rainbow trout.

A notable rock formation, the Omarama or Ahuriri River Clay Cliffs, is located close to the river's north bank some 10 kilometres (6.2 mi) west of the township of Omarama. Omarama is the main settlement close to the river.

== See also ==
- List of rivers of New Zealand
