= Little Awakino River =

Coordinates: 44.696279°S 170.434329°E

Location
- Country: New Zealand

Physical characteristics
- Mouth
  - location: Waitaki River

The Little Awakino River is a river of North Otago, New Zealand. A tributary of the Waitaki River, it flows into that river a short distance downstream of Lake Waitaki.

Near its headwaters, the river is less than 1 km (0.62 mi) from the Awakino River West Branch, which joins with its East Branch to form the Awakino River and join the Waitaki between the Little Awakino and Kurow.

== See also ==
- List of rivers of New Zealand
