= Andrew Davidson (educationalist) =

New Zealand educationalist (1894–1982)

Andrew McRae Davidson (10 November 1894 – 14 October 1982) was a New Zealand teacher, principal, welfare worker and educationalist. He was born in Dunedin, New Zealand on 10 November 1894. He was headmaster of Kurow School from 1927, where he helped create a free medical service for the workers at the Waitaki hydroelectric station. In 1935, he became headmaster at the Macandrew Road School in Dunedin and when the Macandrew Intermediate School was established on the same site in 1940, he became its head until his retirement in 1954. Subsequently, he was a member of the Otago Education Board for 12 years and a justice of the peace.
