= Hakataramea River =

Coordinates: 44°44′S 170°29′E

- Location of the mouth within New Zealand

Location
- Country: New Zealand

Physical characteristics
- Source
  - location: Dalgety Range
- Mouth
  - location: Waitaki River

The Hakataramea River flows generally south through the Hakataramea Valley, which is separated from the more inland Mackenzie Basin by the Kirkliston Range in Canterbury, New Zealand.

A major tributary of the Waitaki River, it flows for 70 kilometres (43 mi) before joining the river from the northeast just below the town of Kurow in the village of Hakataramea.
