= Ōhau River =

Ōhau River may refer to two watercourses in New Zealand:

- Ōhau River (Canterbury)
- Ōhau River (Manawatū-Whanganui)
