= Awakino River =

Awakino River may refer to several Rivers in New Zealand:

- Awakino River (Waikato), a tributary of the Tasman Sea
- Awakino River (Northland), a tributary of the Wairoa River
- Awakino River (Canterbury), a tributary of the Waitaki River; see rivers of New Zealand
- Awakino River East Branch, a tributary of the Awakino River in the Canterbury region; see Little Awakino River
- Awakino River West Branch, a tributary of the Awakino River in the Canterbury region; see Little Awakino River
- Little Awakino River, a tributary of the Waitaki River
