= Otematata River =

Coordinates: 44°36′S 170°13′E

Location
- Country: New Zealand

The Otematata River is a river in North Otago, New Zealand. It rises west of Kohurau and flows northward into Lake Aviemore east of Otematata township.

== See also ==
- List of rivers of New Zealand
