= Twizel River =

River in New Zealand

Coordinates: 44.330349°S 170.186654°E

Location
- Country: New Zealand

Physical characteristics
- Source
  - location: Ben Ohau Range
- Mouth
  - location: Lake Benmore
- Length: 30 km (19 mi)

The Twizel River is a river of the Mackenzie Basin, in the Canterbury region of New Zealand's South Island. It is part of the Waitaki River system. It was named after Twizel Bridge in Northumberland by John Turnbull Thomson, Chief Surveyor of Otago in the mid-1800s.

The Twizel River originates from numerous streams which flow down the eastern flanks of the Ben Ohau Range, the longest being Gladstone Stream and Duncan Stream. The Twizel River flows south, veering slowly southeast close to the town of Twizel, and empties into the northern end of the artificial lake, Lake Benmore.

== See also ==
- List of rivers of New Zealand
