= Benmore Dam =

Dam in New Zealand

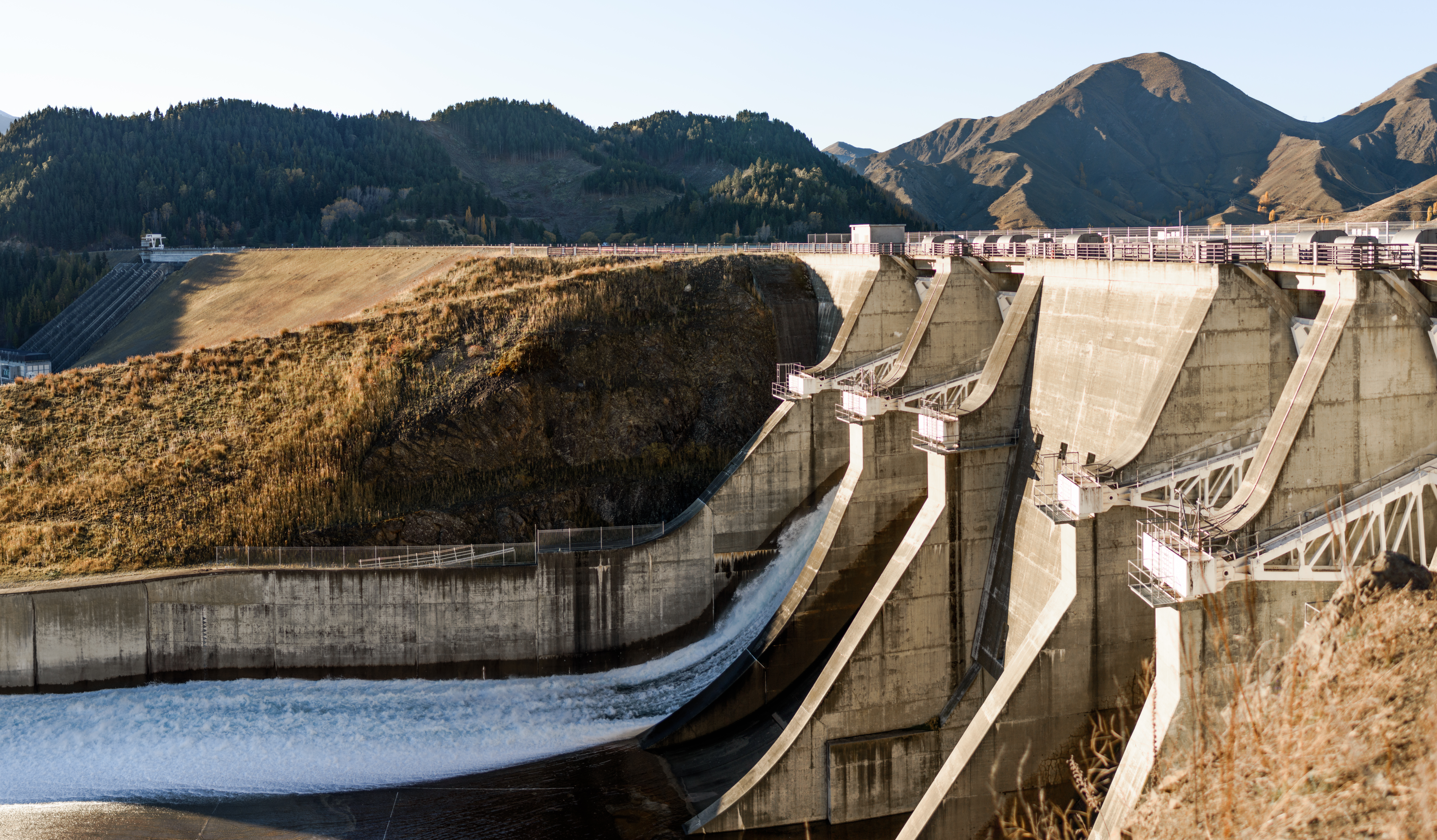

- Location within New Zealand
- Location: Canterbury Region, New Zealand
- Coordinates: 44°33′50.92″S 170°11′49.92″E
- Construction cost: $62 million

Dam and spillways
- Type of dam: Earth-filled dam
- Impounds: Waitaki River
- Height: 110 m (360 ft)
- Length: 823 m (2,700 ft)
- Width (crest): 10.6 m (35 ft)
- Width (base): 490 m (1,610 ft)
- Dam volume: 28 million tonnes
- Spillway capacity: 3,400 km^{3} (820 cu mi)

Reservoir
- Creates: Lake Benmore
- Total capacity: 1.25 km^{3} (1,010,000 acre⋅ft)
- Surface area: 75 km^{2} (29 sq mi)
- Maximum water depth: 102 m (335 ft)

Power Station
- Operator: Meridian Energy
- Commission date: 1965
- Hydraulic head: 92 m (302 ft)
- Turbines: 6 x 90 MW (120,000 hp)
- Installed capacity: 540 MW (720,000 hp)
- Annual generation: 2,215 GWh (7,970 TJ)

Benmore Dam is the largest dam within the Waitaki power scheme, located in the Canterbury Region of New Zealand's South Island. There are eight other power stations in the Waitaki Power Scheme.

The dam is the largest earth-fill (zoned embankment dam) water-retaining structure in New Zealand. Its core is low permeability clay material, supported by two massive shoulders of river gravel. Lake Benmore has a volume of 1.25 billion cubic metres, about 1.5 times as much water as Wellington Harbour. The dam's spillway can cope with over 6,000 cubic metres of water per second, about 20 times the mean river flow.

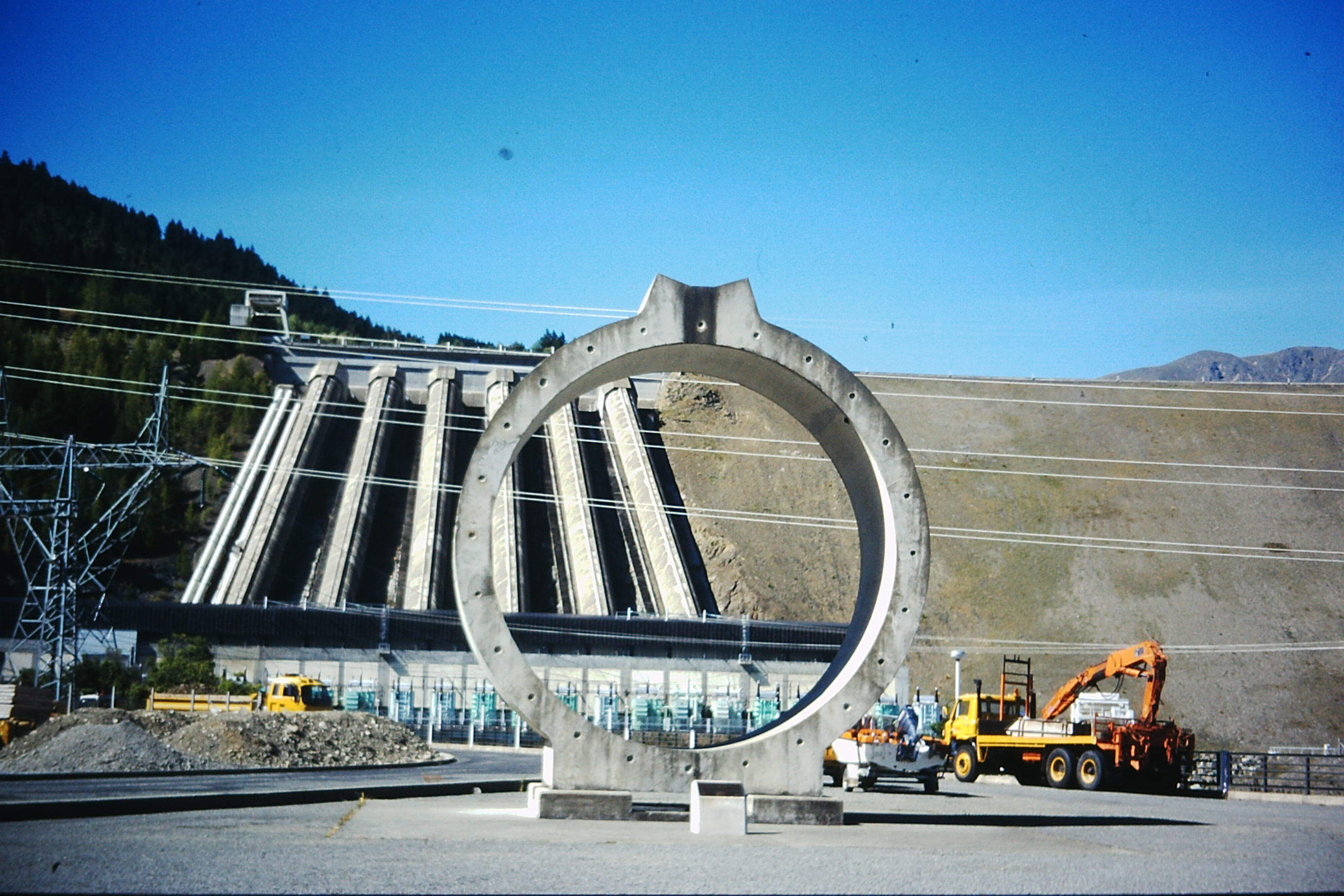
Dam of Benmore hydropower station

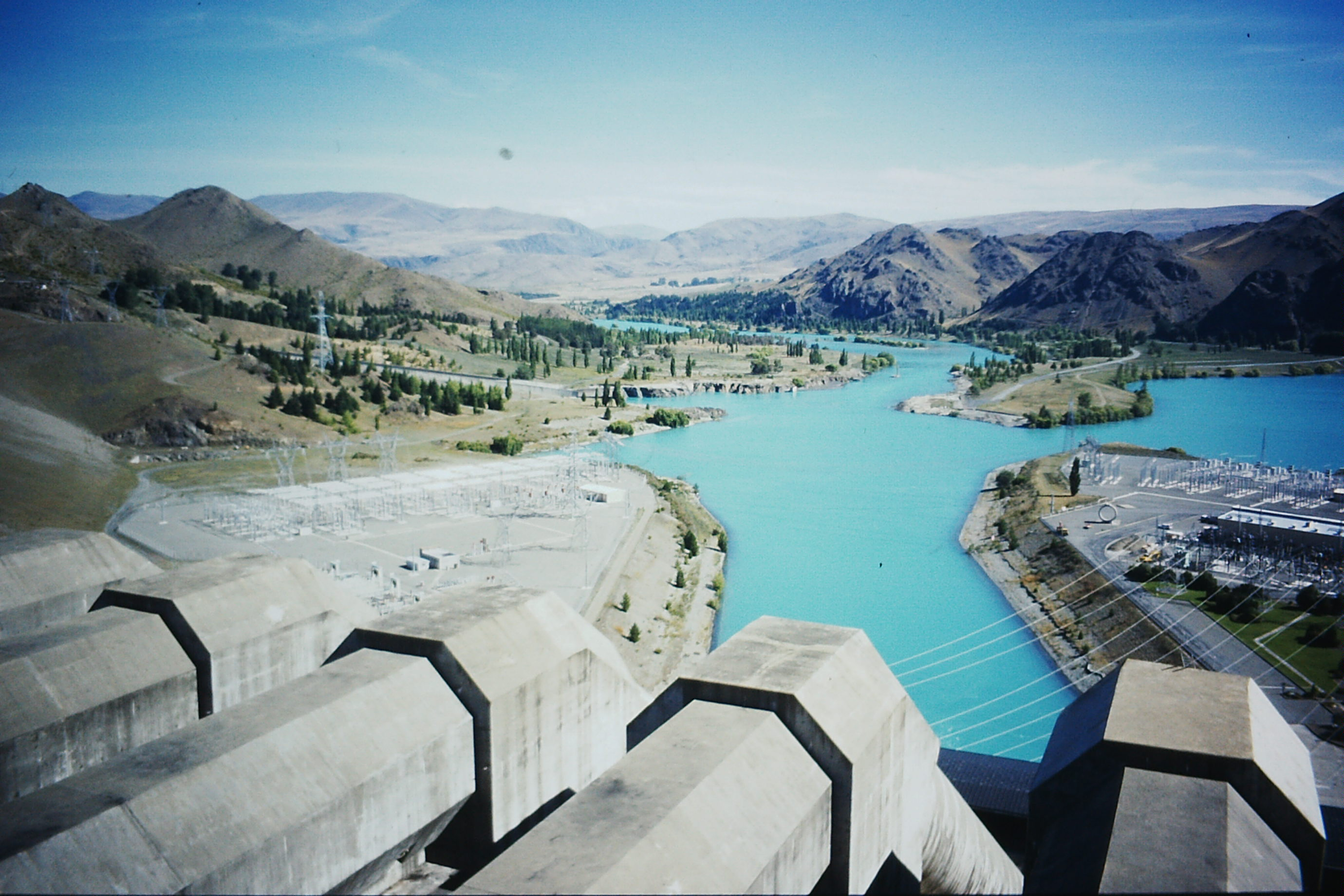
Lake below Benmore hydropower station

== Benmore Power Station ==
With a generating capacity of 540 megawatts (720,000 hp), Benmore Power Station is the second largest hydro station in New Zealand behind Manapouri, and the largest dam in the country.

Construction of the dam and hydroelectric station began in 1958 at a cost of $62 million. It was commissioned in 1965, and was officially opened by Prime Minister Sir Keith Holyoake on 15 May that year. It was built for the New Zealand Electricity Department; since 1999 it has been owned and operated by Meridian Energy.

From 2008 to 2010, the six turbines were refurbished at a cost of $67 million. This enabled a 6% reduction in water use for the same generation capacity, increasing annual generation by 70 GWh (250 TJ). New switchboards and an upgrade to the switchyard were also undertaken.

Benmore is the South Island terminus of the HVDC Inter-Island link between the North and South Islands of New Zealand. The HVDC converter stations are on the west side of the tailrace, and convert 220 kV AC power to ±350 kV DC for the 610 km (380 mi) journey to the North Island converter station at the Haywards in Lower Hutt.

== Otematata ==
Otematata is the small town that was created to support workers who constructed the dam, and their families. The town was constructed by the Ministry of Works, which residents called "Uncle Mow" or "Big Mow" as it provides every feature, including social activities and clubs, and expelled criminals from the town. After the dam was constructed, much of the village was dismantled. Many of the houses, which had been trucked in from Roxburgh, were trucked away again and moved to the next site in Twizel.

Today Otematata supports the dam, although with advances in technology the staffing needed to maintain the dam is drastically smaller. Due to this the town is now a small holiday community, with only around 200 permanent residents. The dam is about 8 kilometres (5.0 mi) up the valley from the township.

== Key statistics ==
- Lake Benmore area: ~ 75 square kilometres
- Lake Benmore shoreline: 116 km
- Dam crest length: 823 metres
- Dam crest height: 100 metres
- Dam width at base: 490 metres
- Dam width at crest: 10.6 metres
- Dam fill: 28 million tonnes
- Head (hydraulic): 92 metres
- Average river water flow: 340 m³/s
- Nominal annual generation: 2,200 GWh
- Installed capacity: 540 MW
- Machinery: 6 x 90,000 kW vertical Francis turbines (Dominion Engineering, Canada), coupled to 6 x 90,000 kW 112,500 kVA generators (Canadian General Electric); 3 transformers totalling 1,150 MVA
- Penstocks: Prestressed concrete
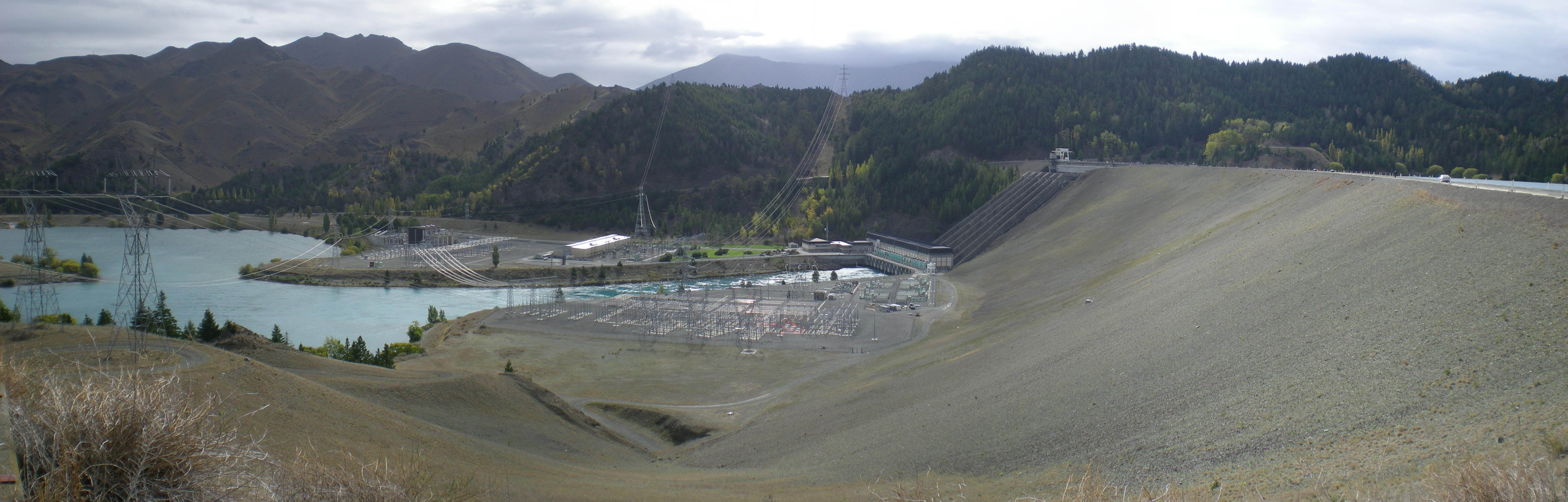
Benmore Dam from the south lookout, near the spillway

== Transmission ==
Benmore is a major switching point in the New Zealand national grid and one of two major switching stations in the Waitaki Valley (the other being Twizel sub-station). The importance is largely due to the location at Benmore of the southern terminal station of the HVDC Inter-Island link.

The main AC switching station is on the east bank of the tailrace, and electricity generated at Benmore Power Station is injected into the national grid here. Three major 220 kV lines containing five circuits run from the Benmore substation. Clockwise from south, they are:

- A double-circuit line to the Twizel sub-station, with one circuit going via Ōhau C power station and one circuit going via Ōhau B power station.
- A single-circuit line to Islington sub-station in Christchurch, via Twizel sub-station and Tekapo B power station.
- A double-circuit line to Aviemore Dam

The HVDC converter stations are located on the west side of the tailrace, connected to the AC switching station by lines over the tailrace. The -350 kV thyristor Pole 2 has its valve hall on the south side of the site. A new +350 kV thyristor Pole 3 was commissioned in 2013 to replace the ageing Pole 1, and its valve hall is located adjacent to the existing Pole 2 valve hall.

== See also ==
- National Grid (New Zealand)
- List of power stations in New Zealand
- Electricity sector in New Zealand
- New Zealand electricity market
