= Waitaki River =

River in the South Island of New Zealand

Waitaki
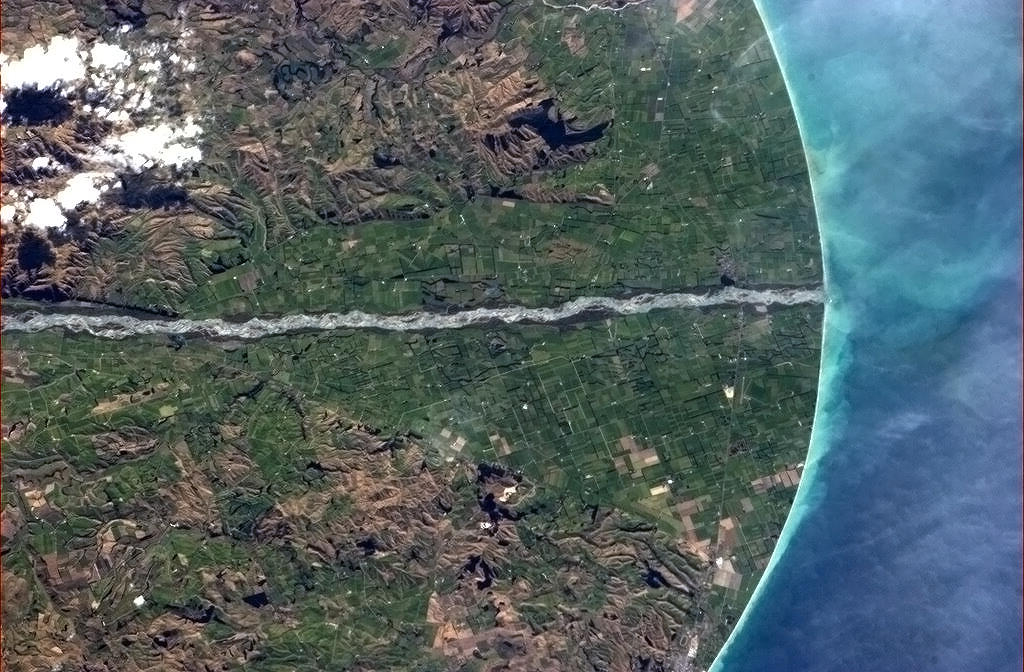
- Lower Waitaki River pictured from the International Space Station

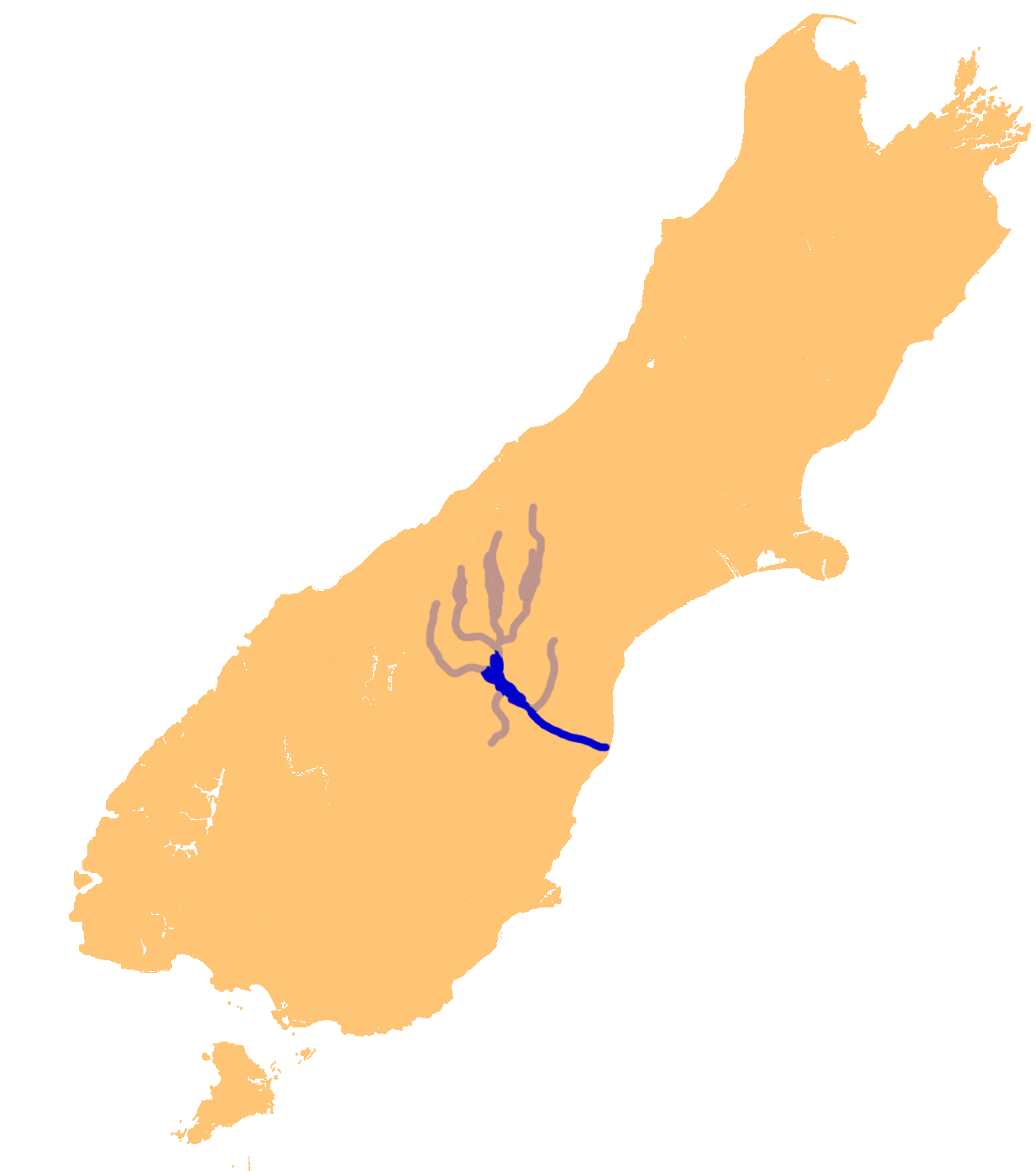
- The Waitaki River system

Location
- Country: New Zealand
- Region: Canterbury, Otago
- District: Waimate, Waitaki
- Cities: Otematata, Kurow, Duntroon, Glenavy

Physical characteristics
- Source: Southern Alps
  - location: Lake Benmore, New Zealand
  - coordinates: 44°21′S 170°12′E
- Source confluence: Ohau River and Tekapo Rivers
- Mouth: Pacific Ocean
  - location: New Zealand
  - coordinates: 44°57′S 171°09′E
  - elevation: 0 m (0 ft)
- Length: 209 km (130 mi)
- Discharge
  - location: Kurow
  - average: 356 m^{3}/s (12,600 cu ft/s)

Basin features
- Tributaries
  - left: Ahuriri, Otematata, Maerewhenua
  - right: Hakataramea

The Waitaki River is a large braided river in the South Island of New Zealand. It drains the Mackenzie Basin and runs 209 kilometres (130 mi) south-east to enter the Pacific Ocean between Timaru and Oamaru on the east coast. It starts at the confluence of the Ōhau and Tekapo rivers, now at the head of the artificial Lake Benmore, these rivers being fed by three large glacial lakes, Pukaki, Tekapo, and Ōhau, at the base of the Southern Alps. The Waitaki flows through Lake Benmore, Lake Aviemore and Lake Waitaki, these lakes being contained by the hydroelectric dams of Benmore Dam, Aviemore Dam and Waitaki Dam. The Waitaki has several tributaries, notably the Ahuriri River and the Hakataramea River. It passes Kurow and Glenavy before entering the Pacific Ocean. The river lends its name to the Waitaki District on the south side of the river.

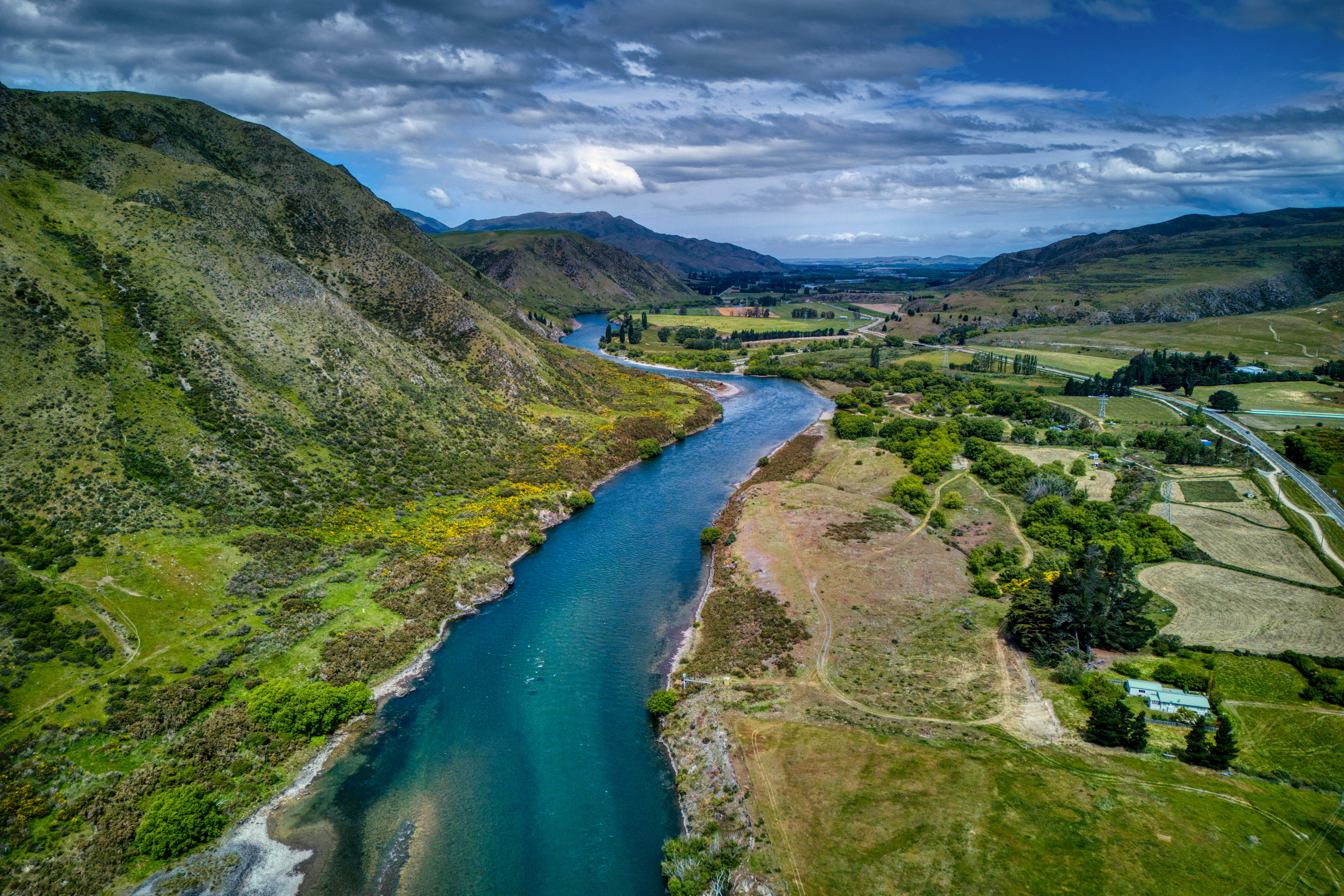
Waitaki River below Waitaki Dam

The river's flow is normally low in winter, with flows increasing in spring when the snow cloaking the Southern Alps begins to melt, with flows throughout the summer being rainfall dependent and then declining in the autumn as the colder weather begins to freeze the smaller streams that feed the catchment. The median flow of the Waitaki River at Kurow is 356 cubic metres per second (12,600 cu ft/s).

The first major infrastructure developments on the river were made between 1881 and 1914 with the construction of road and rail bridges at Kurow and Waitaki Bridge.

The middle of the river bed was a historical political boundary between Canterbury and Otago. The term "south of the Waitaki" is often used to refer to the Otago and Southland regions as one common area (the two regions share historical and ethnic relationships that make them distinct from the regions to the north of them).

The river is popular for recreational fishing and jetboating.

== Toponymy ==
Waitaki translates from southern Māori as 'weeping waters' (wai meaning 'water' and taki meaning 'to weep, mourn'). The equivalent in standard (northern) Māori is Waitangi.

== Electricity generation ==
The river is the site of many hydroelectricity projects. The Waitaki Hydro Scheme, which includes several large dams, is one of the largest hydroelectric projects in the nation.

The Waitaki dam was built first, between 1928 and 1934, and without earth-moving machinery, followed by the development of the Aviemore Dam, which created Lake Aviemore, and then Benmore Dam, which created Lake Benmore. Lake Pukaki was initially dammed at this stage to provide storage and flow control. A small station was also installed on Lake Tekapo, with water taken through a 1.6 km (1 mi) tunnel to a power station below the level of the lake.

The original Waitaki power stations discharge water back into the Waitaki River, which then forms a storage lake for the next station in the chain.

The three power stations are (commissioned/capacity/annual output):

- Waitaki (1935/105 MW/500 GWh)
- Benmore (1965/540 MW/2200 GWh)
- Aviemore (1968/220 MW/940 GWh)

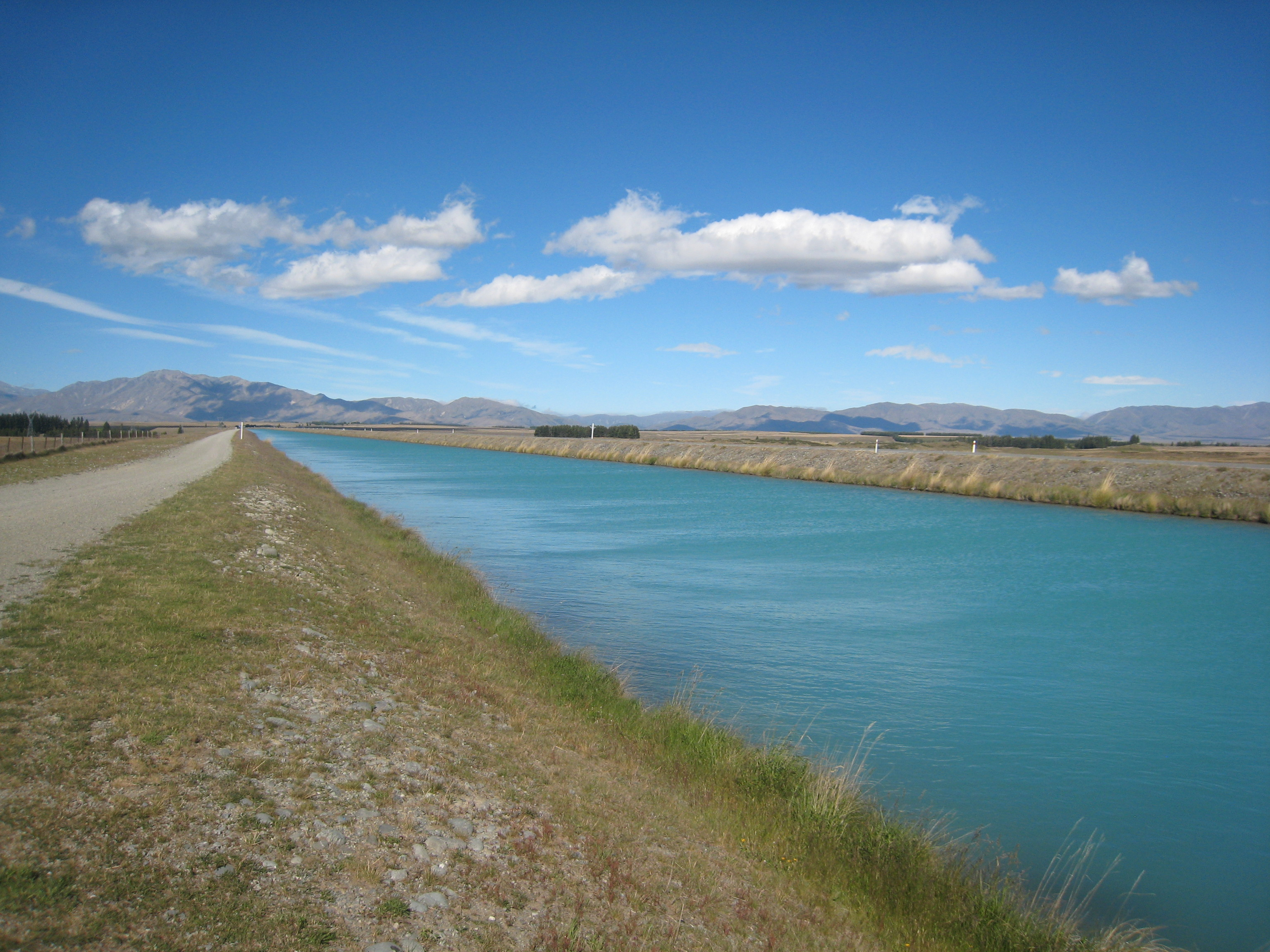
Tekapo Canal

In the 1960s, work was started on the Upper Waitaki project. This project consisted of taking the discharge from the original Tekapo (A) station through the Tekapo Canal to Tekapo B station at the edge of Lake Pukaki. The dam at Pukaki was increased in height. Water from Pukaki is then transferred into the Pukaki Canal, which meets the Ohau Canal from Lake Ōhau into Ōhau A station and Lake Ruataniwha. The Ohau Canal continues beyond Lake Ruataniwha to Ōhau B midway along, before emptying through Ōhau C into Lake Benmore.

The stations are (commissioned/capacity/annual output):

- Tekapo A (1955/25 MW/160 GWh)
- Tekapo B (1977/160 MW/800 GWh)
- Ōhau A (1980/264 MW/1150 GWh)
- Ōhau B (1984-85/212 MW/970 GWh)
- Ōhau C (1984-85/212 MW/970 GWh)

== Later proposals ==
In 2001 a proposal for a new series of canals and dams was made by Meridian Energy for irrigation and electricity generation on the river. This scheme, known as Project Aqua, planned to divert up to 77 percent of the lower river's flow to create a hydroelectric scheme, but these plans were dropped in March 2004. Lack of commercial viability was given as the major reason for the scheme's shelving, although strenuous public protest may also have been a major contributing factor. A more modest successor scheme, the North Bank tunnel, looked likely to proceed, with water rights being granted in 2009, but land access negotiations were suspended in January 2013 due to flat demand for electricity forecast for the next five years.

== See also ==
- List of rivers of New Zealand
- Reservoirs and dams in New Zealand
