= Aviemore Dam =

Dam in New Zealand

Coordinates: 44.655955°S 170.35512°E

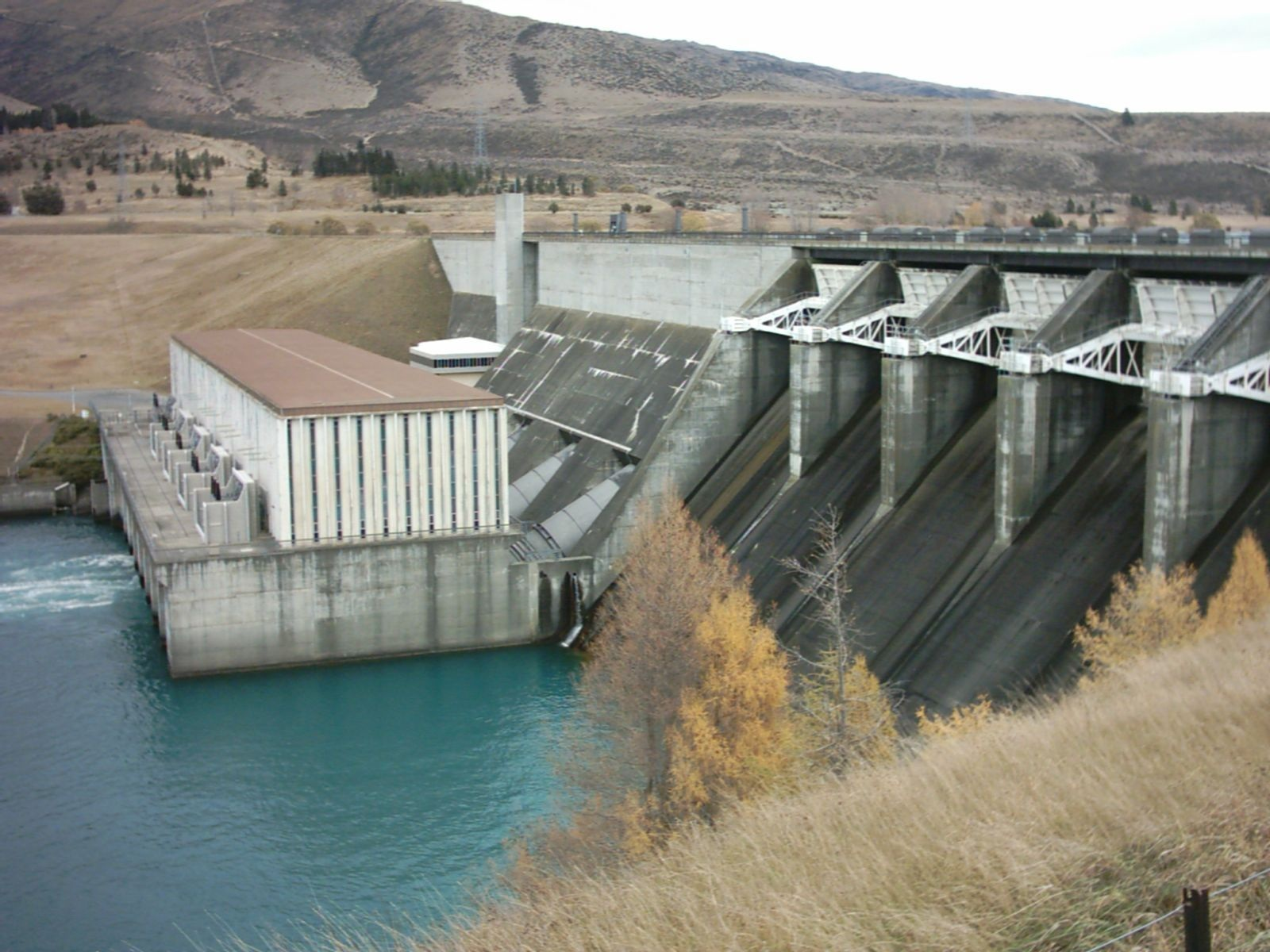
- The dam as seen from the northern side
- Official name: Aviemore Dam
- Location: Canterbury/Otago, New Zealand
- Construction began: 1962
- Opening date: 1968
- Operator(s): Meridian Energy

Dam and spillways
- Impounds: Waitaki River

Reservoir
- Creates: Lake Aviemore

The Aviemore Dam is a dam on the Waitaki River in New Zealand. The dam is a composite dam, with an embankment section, and a concrete section. Built in the 1960s (and completed in 1968) it impounds Lake Aviemore.

Aviemore Dam is owned and operated by Meridian Energy, and its primary purpose is to power a hydroelectric power plant. It is a part of the Waitaki River Hydroelectric System, a scheme which supplies 30% of New Zealand's considerable amount of hydropower.

== Characteristics ==
=== Composite Dam structure ===
The founding conditions of the dam differ on either side of the Waitangi Fault, hence different dam construction types are used. On the northern side of the valley (Canterbury side), the dam is founded on greywacke rock, and consists of a 335-metre (1,099 ft)-long concrete structure. On the southern side of the valley (Otago side), the dam is founded on tertiary sedimentary rock, an consists of a 457 metres (1,499 ft) long zoned embankment (earth) dam. During the construction of the concrete section, low-heat cement was first used in a large-scale application in New Zealand, to allow quick concrete pouring without the need for cooling elements. The dams spill outlets and penstocks are incorporated into the concrete dam section.

=== Hydroelectric facilities ===
The dam's hydroelectric generation facilities consist of 4 Francis turbines each of 55 megawatts (74,000 hp), with a total capacity of 220 megawatts (300,000 hp) total), with the generators being 4 x 11 kV. The facility produces approximately 942 gigawatt-hours (3,390 TJ) of electricity per year. The net hydraulic head is 37 metres (121 ft), with the penstocks (water pipes leading to the turbines) being the largest diameter in New Zealand at the time of construction, at 7 metres (23 ft) diameter each.

=== Seismic enhancement ===
In the mid 2000's (decade), work was undertaken to enhance the dam and its appurtenant structures against the effects of earthquake loads, and to reduce the risk of overtopping resulting from earthquake-induced seiche waves in Lake Aviemore, in the event of rupture of the Waitangi Fault.

At the time of construction the Waitangi fault had been considered inactive, but investigations in the early 2000's found the fault to be active (but with low probability of movement). The analysis and safety evaluation of the dam, and design of enhancements was led by URS Consultants, who received an ACENZ Innovate NZ Silver Award for their safety evaluation and upgrade.
