= Lake Benmore =

Lake in the South Island of New Zealand

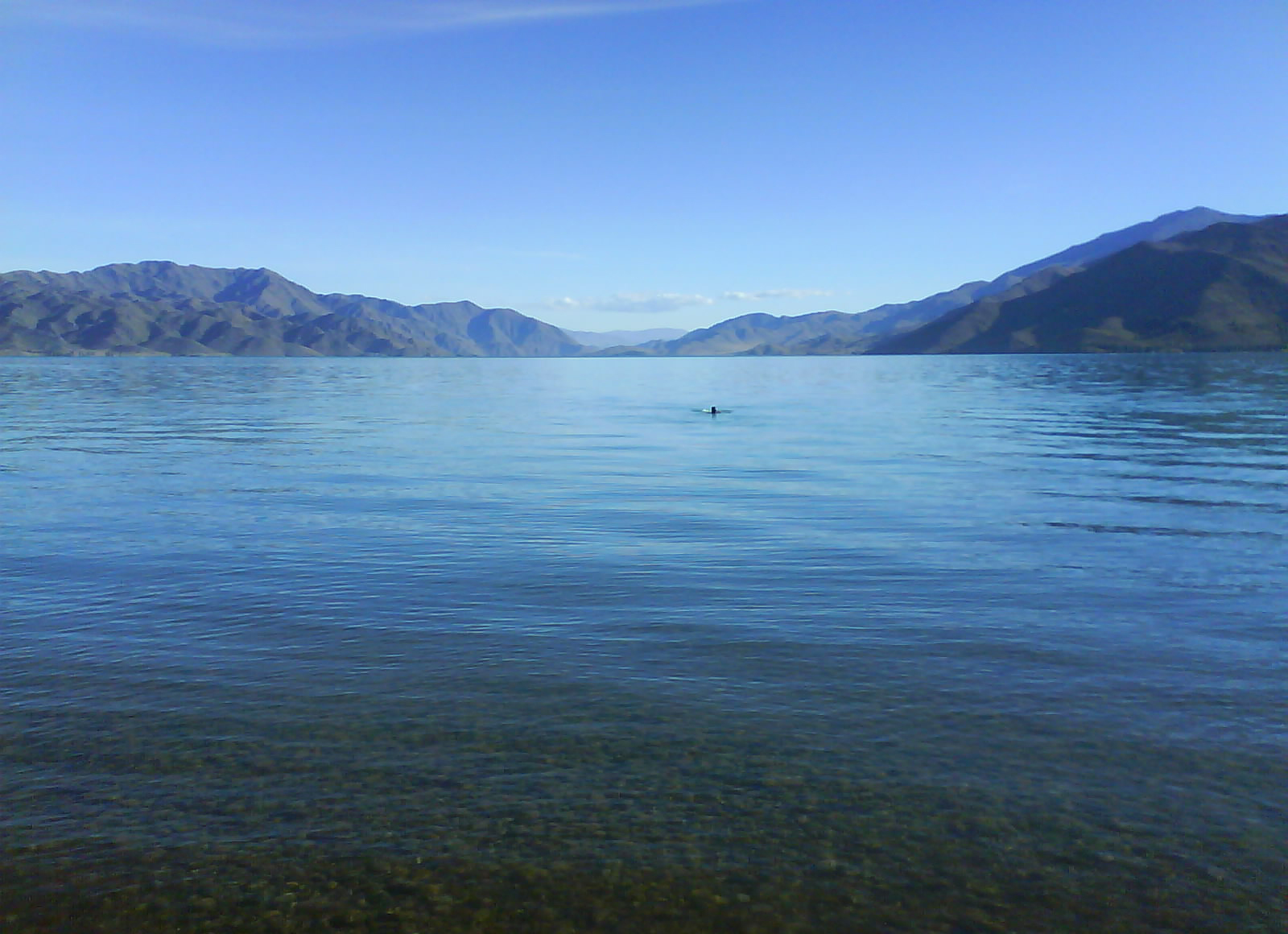
- Looking south

- Location within South Island
- Interactive map of Lake Benmore
- Location: Mackenzie, Waimate, and Waitaki Districts, Canterbury region, South Island
- Coordinates: 44°24′54″S 170°13′14″E
- Lake type: reservoir
- Primary inflows: Ōhau, Pukaki, Tekapo, Ahuriri
- Basin countries: New Zealand
- Surface area: 75 km^{2} (29 sq mi)
- Max. depth: 90 m (300 ft)
- Surface elevation: 362 m (1,188 ft)

Lake Benmore is New Zealand's largest artificial lake. Located in the South Island of New Zealand and part of the Waitaki River, it was created in the 1960s by construction of Benmore Dam.

== Characteristics ==
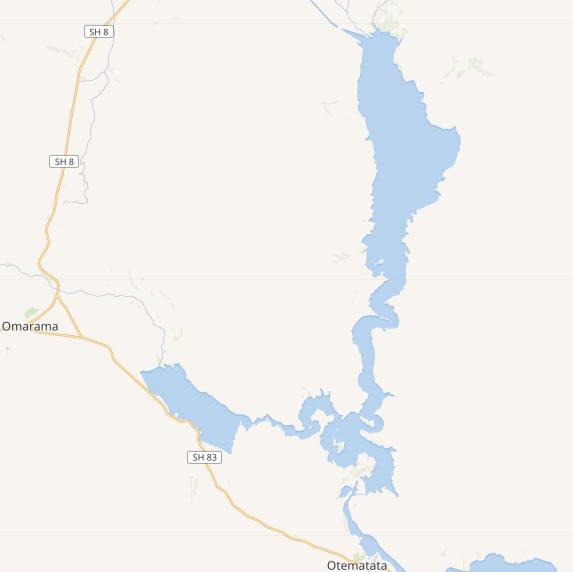
Map showing the shape of Lake Benmore, with the Ahuriri arm coming from the west and the Haldon arm coming from the north

The lake has an area of about 75 km² and a maximum depth of 90 meters. The lake consists of two arms: the Haldon arm, fed mainly by the Tekapo, Pukaki and Twizel rivers, and the Ōhau Canal; and the Ahuriri Arm, fed mainly by the Ahuriri River. Immediately downstream is Lake Aviemore.

As of 2023, Land Air Water Aotearoa described the water quality as "very good", with a trophic level index of 1.8. It also described the quality of ecological conditions as "high", with a lake submerged plant indicators score of 72.0%.

The lake is split between the Mackenzie, Waimate, and Waitaki districts, within the southern portion of the Canterbury Region.

== Construction ==
The lake is the reservoir of Benmore Dam, New Zealand's largest earth dam, which was created as part of the Waitaki hydroelectricity power scheme. Construction of Benmore Dam was approved in 1957 and the lake was filled in December 1964.

After the lake was created the incidence of seismic shocks increased by a factor of three to six times.

== Uses ==
Besides being a reservoir for Benmore Dam, the lake is a fishing spot; in 2009 it was the second most-fished lake in New Zealand, with fish such as brown trout, rainbow trout, chinook salmon, and sockeye salmon. Fish in the lake include salmon that have escaped from salmon farms on nearby hydro canals. The lake is also used for swimming and camping and there are walks in the area.

== Climate ==
Climate data for Lake Benmore (Benmore Dam) (1981–2010)
Month	Jan	Feb	Mar	Apr	May	Jun	Jul	Aug	Sep	Oct	Nov	Dec	Year
Mean daily maximum °C (°F)	24.1 (75.4)	23.3 (73.9)	21.3 (70.3)	17.3 (63.1)	13.1 (55.6)	8.9 (48.0)	7.8 (46.0)	11.0 (51.8)	14.8 (58.6)	17.5 (63.5)	20.0 (68.0)	22.1 (71.8)	16.8 (62.2)
Daily mean °C (°F)	18.1 (64.6)	17.7 (63.9)	15.8 (60.4)	12.5 (54.5)	9.0 (48.2)	5.6 (42.1)	4.4 (39.9)	6.7 (44.1)	9.6 (49.3)	12.1 (53.8)	14.4 (57.9)	16.5 (61.7)	11.9 (53.4)
Mean daily minimum °C (°F)	12.2 (54.0)	12.2 (54.0)	10.3 (50.5)	7.7 (45.9)	4.8 (40.6)	2.3 (36.1)	0.9 (33.6)	2.4 (36.3)	4.4 (39.9)	6.7 (44.1)	8.9 (48.0)	10.9 (51.6)	7.0 (44.6)
Average rainfall mm (inches)	46.1 (1.81)	38.4 (1.51)	45.5 (1.79)	36.4 (1.43)	34.9 (1.37)	37.0 (1.46)	34.8 (1.37)	32.5 (1.28)	29.7 (1.17)	37.5 (1.48)	37.8 (1.49)	52.1 (2.05)	462.7 (18.21)
Source: CliFlo (rain 1971–2000)

== See also ==
- Electricity sector in New Zealand
- Lakes of New Zealand
- List of lakes in New Zealand
