= Kurow =

Town in Canterbury, New Zealand

Kurow Te Kohurau
- Rural centre
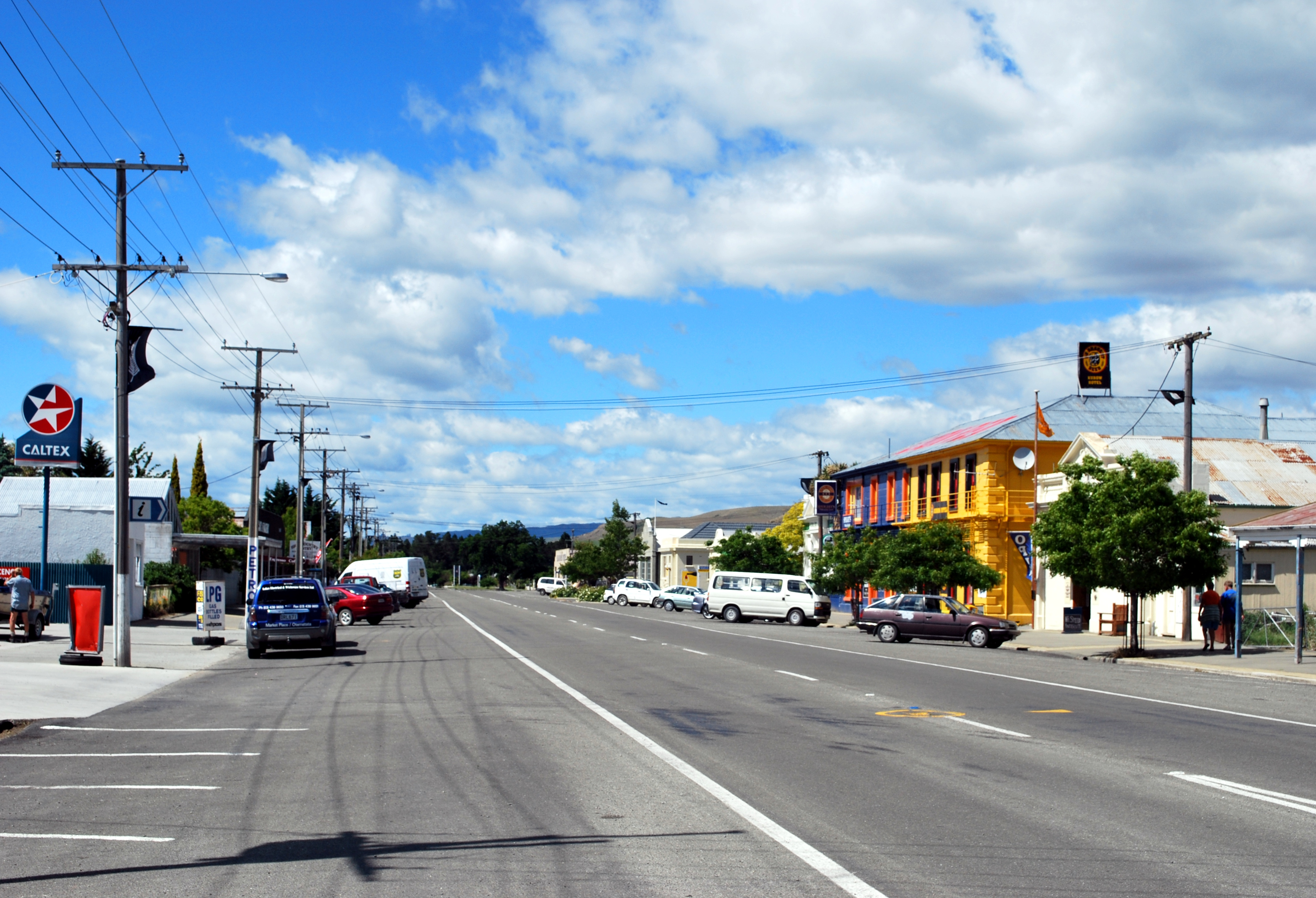
- Bledisloe St (State Highway 83) in Kurow
- Interactive map of Kurow
- Coordinates: 44°44′S 170°28′E
- Country: New Zealand
- Region: Canterbury
- Territorial authority: Waitaki District
- Ward: Ahuriri Ward
- Community: Ahuriri Community
- Electorates: Waitaki; Te Tai Tonga (Māori)

Government
  - Territorial authority: Waitaki District Council
  - Regional council: Environment Canterbury
  - Mayor of Waitaki: Melanie Tavendale
  - Waitaki MP: Miles Anderson
  - Te Tai Tonga MP: Mananui Ramsden

Area
  - Total: 2.44 km^{2} (0.94 sq mi)

Population (June 2025)
  - Total: 360
  - Density: 150/km^{2} (380/sq mi)
- Time zone: UTC+12 (New Zealand Standard Time)
  - Summer (DST): UTC+13 (New Zealand Daylight Time)
- Postcode: 9435
- Local iwi: Ngāi Tahu

Kurow is a small town in the Waitaki District, New Zealand. It is located on the south bank of the Waitaki River, 60 kilometres (37 mi) northwest of Oamaru. The name is an Anglicised form of the Māori name of the nearby mountain, Te Kohurau.

== History ==
The town was the terminus of the Kurow Branch railway, opened in 1881 to Hakataramea, across the Waitaki River, but cut back to Kurow in 1930. It closed in 1983: the line can be traced on the ground, and the station building still stands on Liverpool St. From 1928 until 1937, a line owned by the Public Works Department ran from Kurow to the hydroelectric project 6.4 km to the west.

In the 1920s, the town was the base for the building of the nearby Waitaki Dam and forming Lake Waitaki in the first of a series of hydroelectric projects on the Waitaki River. Further hydroelectricity development on the lower Waitaki River was proposed by Project Aqua and the North Bank Tunnel, however neither of these proceeded past the planning stage.

The first social security scheme for New Zealand workers was designed in this town, arising from the experiences of Dr Gervan McMillan as the area's solo GP, Arnold Nordmeyer as the Presbyterian Minister and Andrew Davidson as a schoolteacher, in working with families of workers on the Waitaki hydro-electric project. McMillan and Nordmeyer later became Members of Parliament.

The land around the town includes summerfruit orchards, and the Waitaki Valley wine region was established in 2001 with the first Pinot noir vineyards planted in the limestone soils. In 2021, there were 13 wineries and vineyards in operation in the Waitaki Valley.

The Vintner's Drop opened in Kurow's former post office in 2009 as a wine-tasting and retail outlet for local wines. It served as the cellar door and tasting room for Clos Ostler.

Kurow had been trying to fund a statue of Richie McCaw since 2016 but has struggled to raise the required money. A seven metre tall statue was being considered at one stage.

== Demographics ==
Kurow is described as a rural settlement by Statistics New Zealand, and covers 2.44 km^{2} (0.94 sq mi). It had an estimated population of 360 as of June 2025, with a population density of 148 people per km^{2}. It is part of the larger Danseys Pass statistical area.

Historical population for Kurow
Year	Pop.	±% p.a.
2006	348	—
2013	306	−1.82%
2018	366	+3.65%
2023	348	−1.00%
The 2006 population is for a larger area of 4.91 km^{2}. Source:

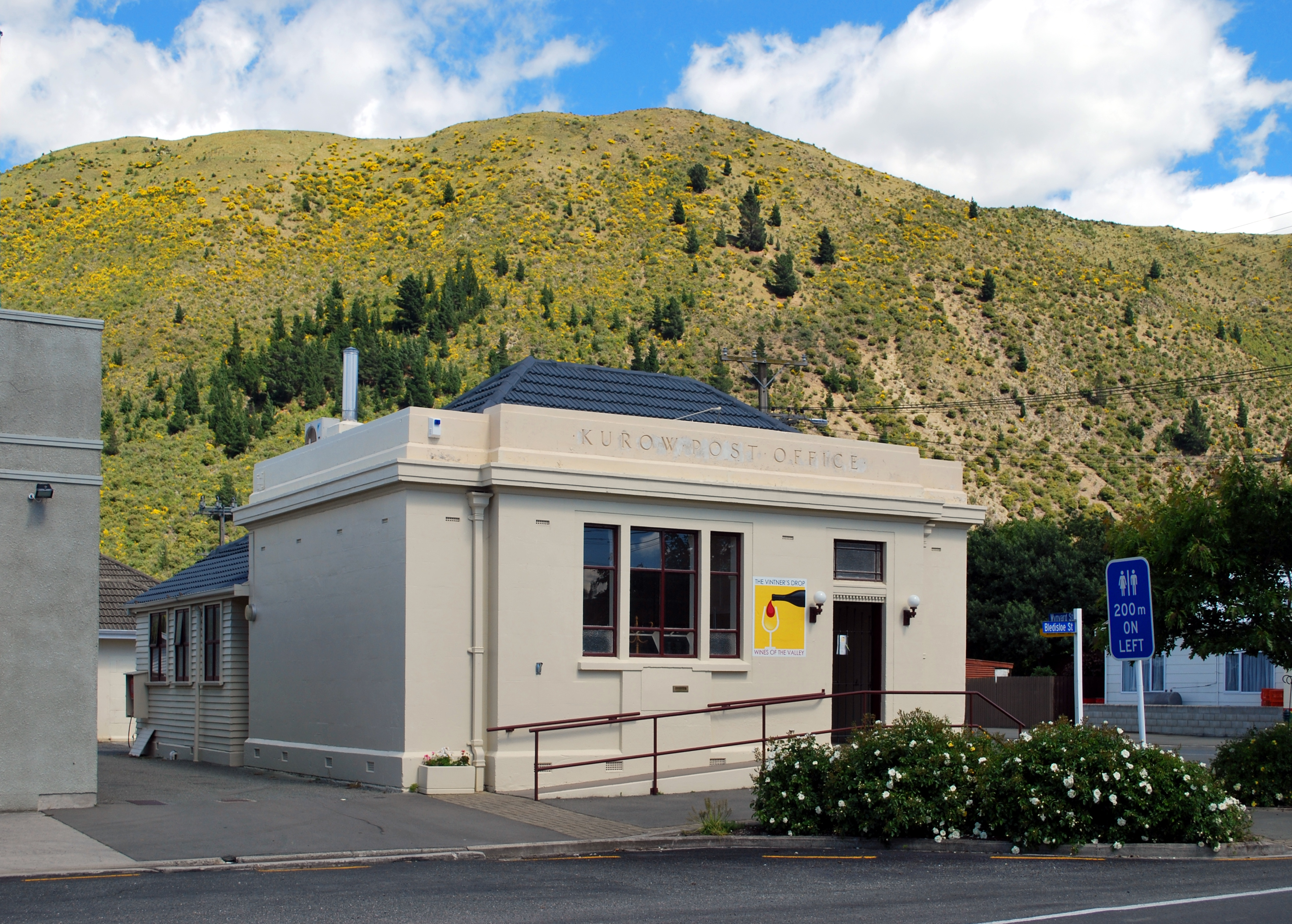
Former post office building

Kurow had a population of 348 in the 2023 New Zealand census, a decrease of 18 people (−4.9%) since the 2018 census, and an increase of 42 people (13.7%) since the 2013 census. There were 171 males, 174 females, and 3 people of other genders in 159 dwellings. 0.9% of people identified as LGBTIQ+. The median age was 59.8 years (compared with 38.1 years nationally). There were 42 people (12.1%) aged under 15 years, 36 (10.3%) aged 15 to 29, 141 (40.5%) aged 30 to 64, and 126 (36.2%) aged 65 or older.

People could identify as more than one ethnicity. The results were 93.1% European (Pākehā); 14.7% Māori; 1.7% Pasifika; 2.6% Asian; 0.9% Middle Eastern, Latin American and African New Zealanders (MELAA); and 1.7% other, which includes people giving their ethnicity as "New Zealander". English was spoken by 100.0%, Māori by 0.9%, and other languages by 4.3%. The percentage of people born overseas was 12.1, compared with 28.8% nationally.

Religious affiliations were 45.7% Christian, 0.9% Islam, 0.9% Buddhist, and 0.9% other religions. People who answered that they had no religion were 44.0%, and 6.9% of people did not answer the census question.

Of those at least 15 years old, 33 (10.8%) people had a bachelor's or higher degree, 156 (51.0%) had a post-high school certificate or diploma, and 120 (39.2%) people exclusively held high school qualifications. The median income was $28,000, compared with $41,500 nationally. 18 people (5.9%) earned over $100,000 compared to 12.1% nationally. The employment status of those at least 15 was 111 (36.3%) full-time, 60 (19.6%) part-time, and 6 (2.0%) unemployed.

=== Danseys Pass statistical area ===
The Danseys Pass statistical area, which also includes Duntroon, covers 711.49 km^{2} (274.71 sq mi) and had an estimated population of 1,060 as of June 2025, with a population density of 1.5 people per km^{2}.

Historical population for Danseys Pass
Year	Pop.	±% p.a.
2006	864	—
2013	915	+0.82%
2018	987	+1.53%
2023	993	+0.12%

Danseys Pass had a population of 993 in the 2023 New Zealand census, an increase of 6 people (0.6%) since the 2018 census, and an increase of 78 people (8.5%) since the 2013 census. There were 495 males, 498 females, and 3 people of other genders in 438 dwellings. 1.5% of people identified as LGBTIQ+. The median age was 46.1 years (compared with 38.1 years nationally). There were 174 people (17.5%) aged under 15 years, 147 (14.8%) aged 15 to 29, 450 (45.3%) aged 30 to 64, and 219 (22.1%) aged 65 or older.

People could identify as more than one ethnicity. The results were 87.9% European (Pākehā); 10.0% Māori; 0.6% Pasifika; 7.9% Asian; 0.9% Middle Eastern, Latin American and African New Zealanders (MELAA); and 1.8% other, which includes people giving their ethnicity as "New Zealander". English was spoken by 98.2%, Māori by 1.2%, and other languages by 7.9%. No language could be spoken by 1.2% (e.g. too young to talk). The percentage of people born overseas was 18.4, compared with 28.8% nationally.

Religious affiliations were 35.3% Christian, 0.3% Islam, 0.3% Māori religious beliefs, 1.8% Buddhist, 0.6% New Age, and 0.9% other religions. People who answered that they had no religion were 52.6%, and 7.6% of people did not answer the census question.

Of those at least 15 years old, 123 (15.0%) people had a bachelor's or higher degree, 444 (54.2%) had a post-high school certificate or diploma, and 252 (30.8%) people exclusively held high school qualifications. The median income was $38,600, compared with $41,500 nationally. 60 people (7.3%) earned over $100,000 compared to 12.1% nationally. The employment status of those at least 15 was 441 (53.8%) full-time, 141 (17.2%) part-time, and 9 (1.1%) unemployed.

== Hotels ==
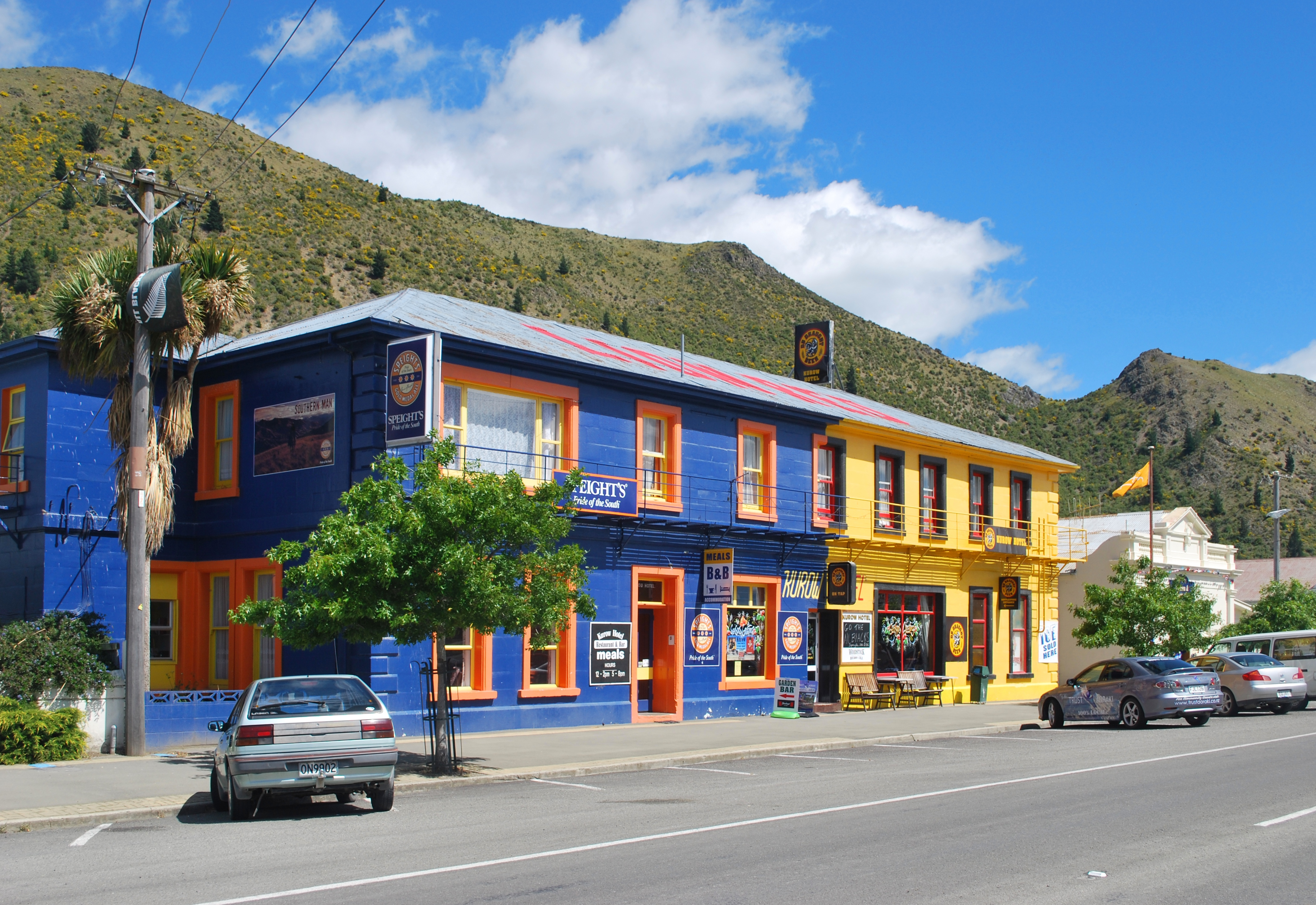
Kurow Hotel

=== Kurow Hotel ===
Christian Hille opened an accommodation house in Kurow in the 1860s. In the 1880s William Goddard took over the business and built a hotel with 24 rooms, a billiard room and stables for horses. The building was designed by Oamaru architect John Megget Forrester, who also reinstated the hotel after it was damaged by fire in 1892. The new building, constructed of Oamaru stone, had 18 bedrooms, five sitting rooms and a dining room which could seat 30. There was also a billiard room and large stables. In 1905 the hotel suffered another serious fire and the hotel moved into the adjoining hall while the building was repaired and rebuilt.

In 1986, the Kurow Hotel was listed as a Category 2 Historic Place by Heritage New Zealand. It is located at 55 Bledisloe Street.

=== Waitaki Hotel ===
Waitaki Hotel was built in 1940 in the Art Deco style, as a replacement for the Bridge Hotel (1860–1908). It is located at 37 Bledisloe Street.

== Kurow Museum ==
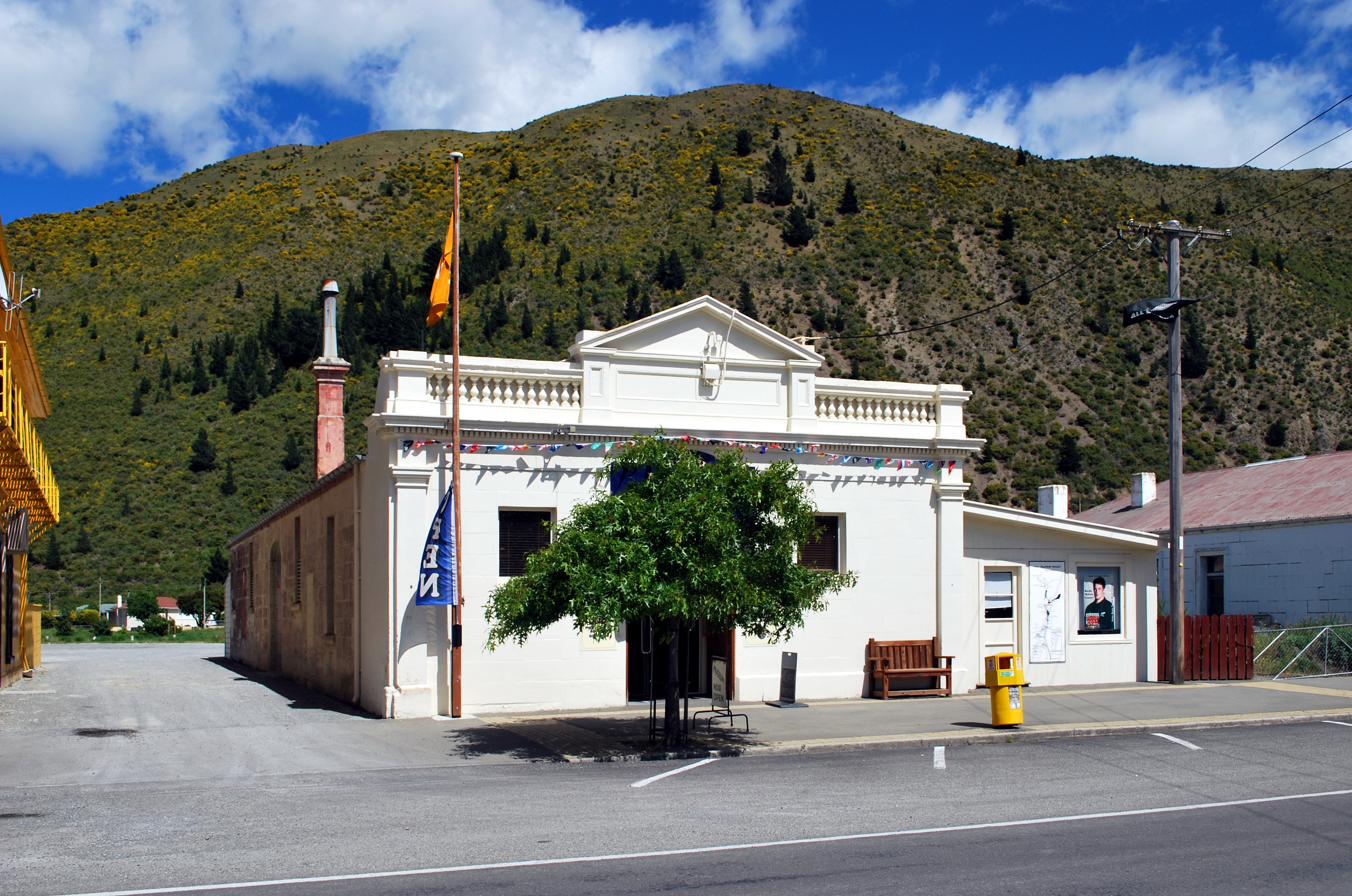
Kurow Museum

The Kurow Museum is located at 57 Bledisloe Street. It showcases early settlers in the area and the development of the social security scheme to help families in need.

== Awakino Ski Area ==
Kurow is the closest town to Awakino Ski Area which is 15 kilometres away, accessed through Awakino Station.

== Education ==
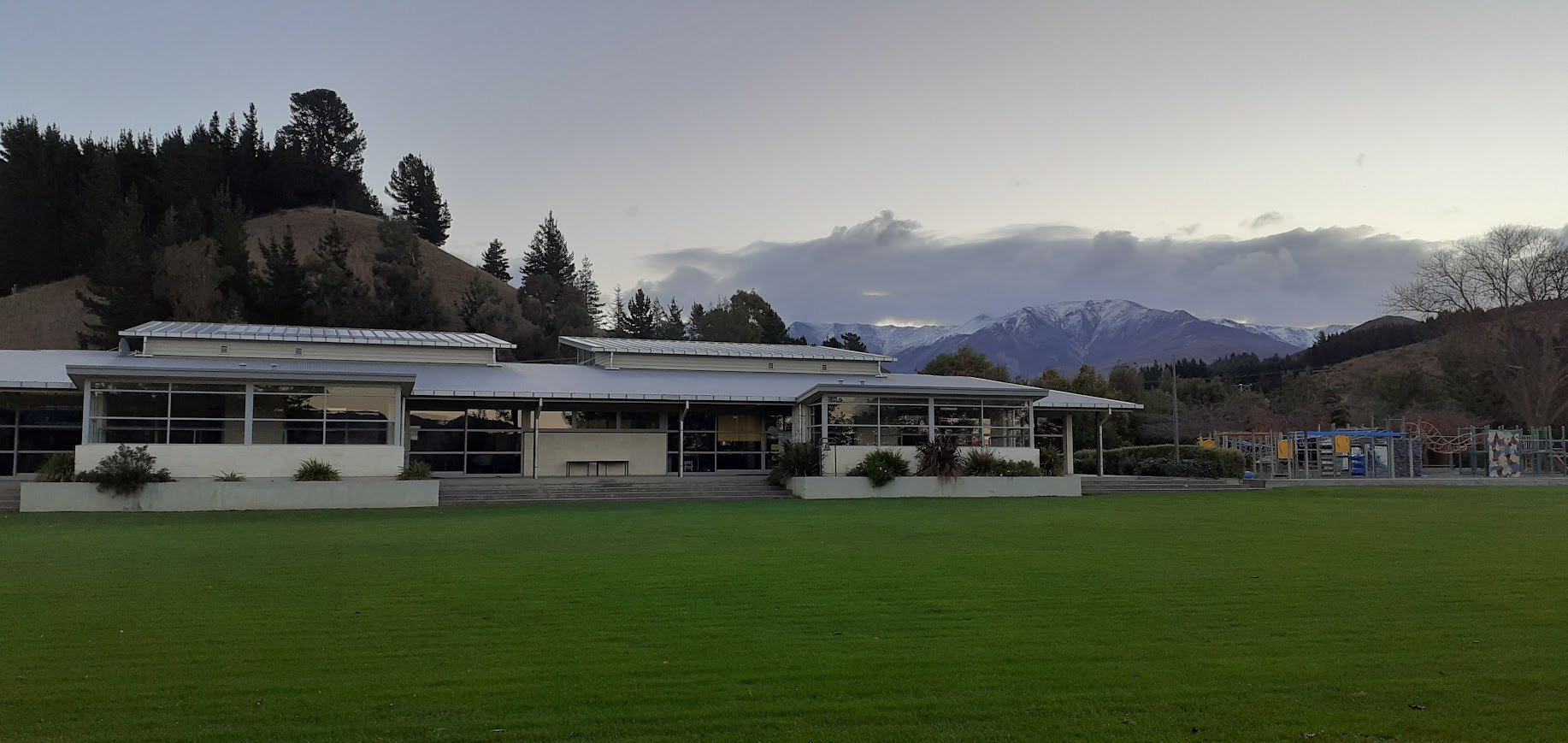
Waitaki Valley School

Waitaki Valley School is a full primary school catering for years 1 to 8, with a roll of 102 students as of July 2026. The school was created from the merger in 2004 of Kurow Area, Otematata, Cattle Creek and Hakataramea schools. It moved to its present site in 2012.

== Notable people ==
Notable people with connections to Kurow include:

- Steve Hotton, Otago rugby player
- Roy Kerr, mathematician
- Richie McCaw, All Black captain
- Dr Gervan McMillan and his wife Ethel, residents of Kurow from 1929 to 1934; Dr McMillan ran a medical practice there.
- Arnold Nordmeyer, minister of finance and Labour Party politician
- Charles Saxton, All Black and rugby administrator

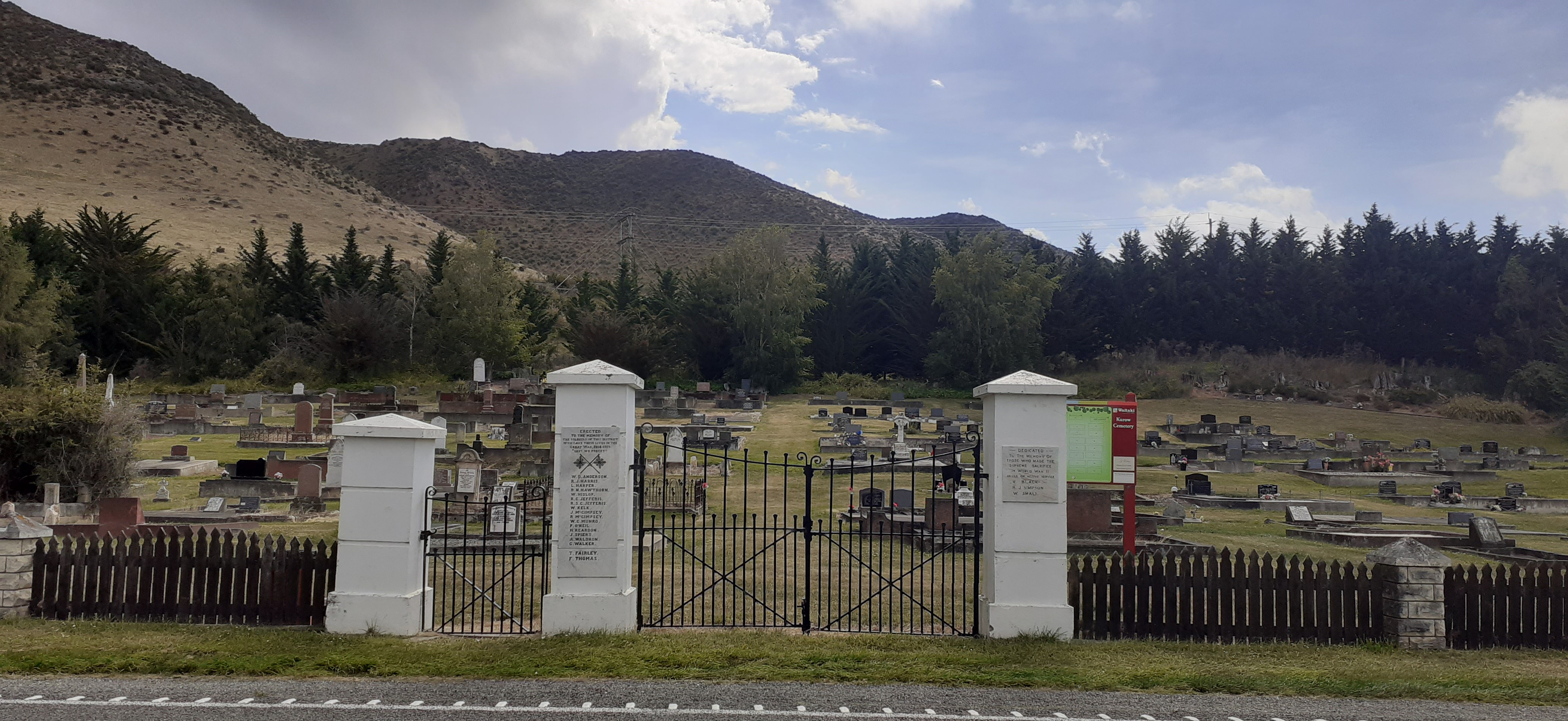
Kurow Cemetery

== Climate ==
Climate data for Kurow (1981–2010)
Month	Jan	Feb	Mar	Apr	May	Jun	Jul	Aug	Sep	Oct	Nov	Dec	Year
Mean daily maximum °C (°F)	23.0 (73.4)	22.3 (72.1)	20.1 (68.2)	17.9 (64.2)	14.1 (57.4)	10.8 (51.4)	10.1 (50.2)	12.2 (54.0)	15.4 (59.7)	17.4 (63.3)	18.9 (66.0)	20.7 (69.3)	16.9 (62.4)
Daily mean °C (°F)	16.8 (62.2)	16.3 (61.3)	14.3 (57.7)	11.8 (53.2)	8.8 (47.8)	5.8 (42.4)	5.2 (41.4)	6.9 (44.4)	9.6 (49.3)	11.4 (52.5)	13.1 (55.6)	15.0 (59.0)	11.3 (52.2)
Mean daily minimum °C (°F)	10.5 (50.9)	10.3 (50.5)	8.5 (47.3)	5.7 (42.3)	3.4 (38.1)	0.8 (33.4)	0.3 (32.5)	1.7 (35.1)	3.8 (38.8)	5.5 (41.9)	7.4 (45.3)	9.3 (48.7)	5.6 (42.1)
Average rainfall mm (inches)	55.1 (2.17)	40.7 (1.60)	60.8 (2.39)	28.8 (1.13)	33.6 (1.32)	24.6 (0.97)	34.2 (1.35)	34.3 (1.35)	28.2 (1.11)	47.3 (1.86)	48.1 (1.89)	68.8 (2.71)	504.5 (19.85)
Source: CliFlo
