= Lake Waitaki =

Lake in the South Island of New Zealand

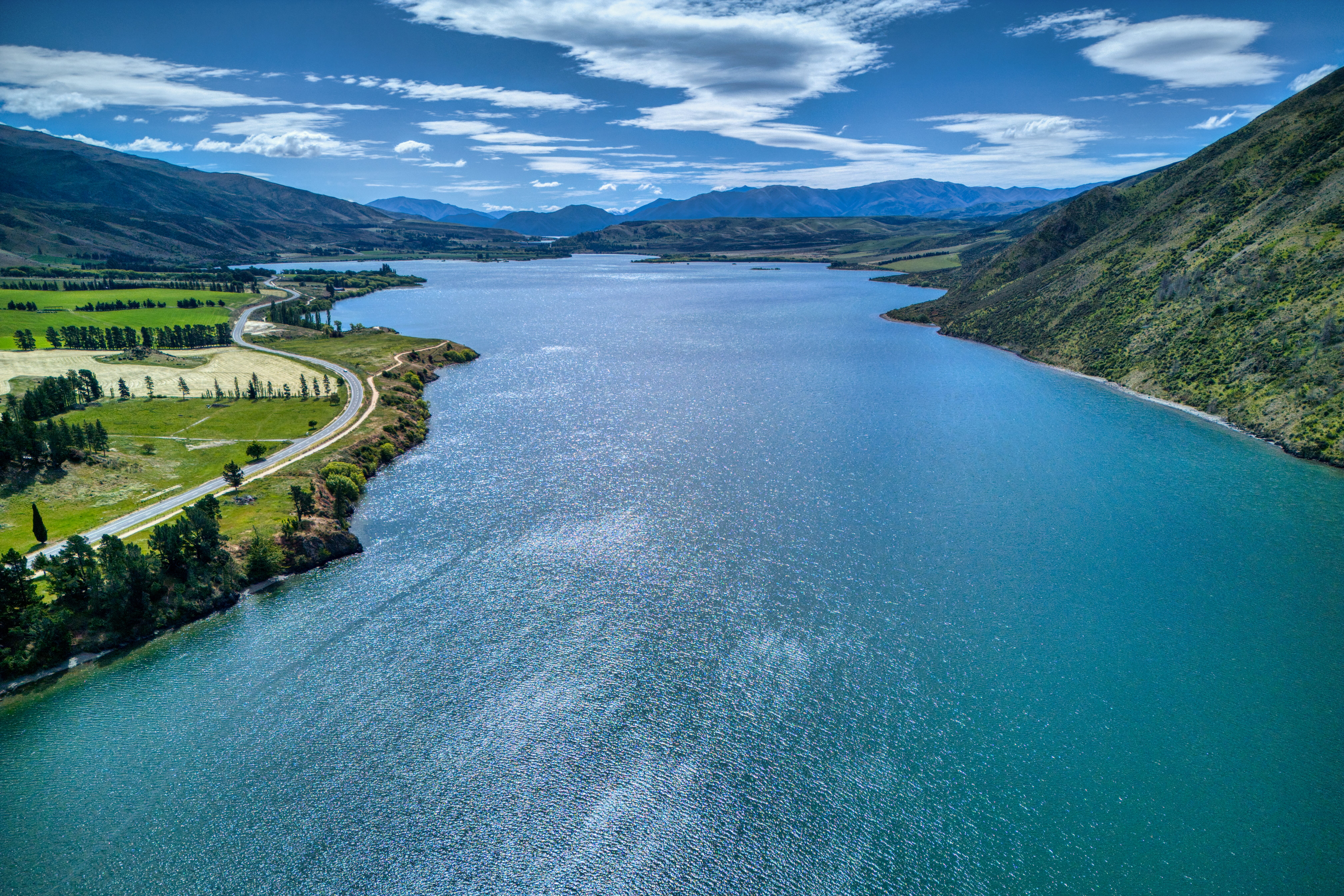

- Location within South Island
- Location: Waimate and Waitaki Districts, Canterbury region, South Island
- Coordinates: 44°40′29″S 170°23′56″E
- Primary inflows: Waitaki
- Primary outflows: Waitaki
- Basin countries: New Zealand
- Surface elevation: 230 m (750 ft)

Lake Waitaki is the smallest, oldest and most downstream of the three man-made lakes on the Waitaki River, and forms part of the Waitaki hydroelectric scheme in New Zealand's South Island. It lies downstream of lakes Aviemore and Benmore on the Waitaki River, close to the town of Kurow. It is part of the traditional boundary of the Canterbury and Otago regions (although the official border has been moved southward to include the entire lake, as well as the entire northwest portion of the Waitaki District within the Canterbury Region.

The lake was created by the Waitaki Dam, a 36-metre-high (118-foot) concrete gravity dam built between 1928 and 1934. Waitaki Dam was the first hydroelectric dam built on the Waitaki River. The Waitaki power station has a total installed capacity of 105MW.

Waitaki was the last dam built in New Zealand with excavation done with pick and shovel, not heavy machinery. The power station was to be upgraded by Meridian Energy between 2011 and 2016 at a projected cost of $NZ 60 – 80 million.
