= Lake Aviemore =

Lake in the South Island of New Zealand

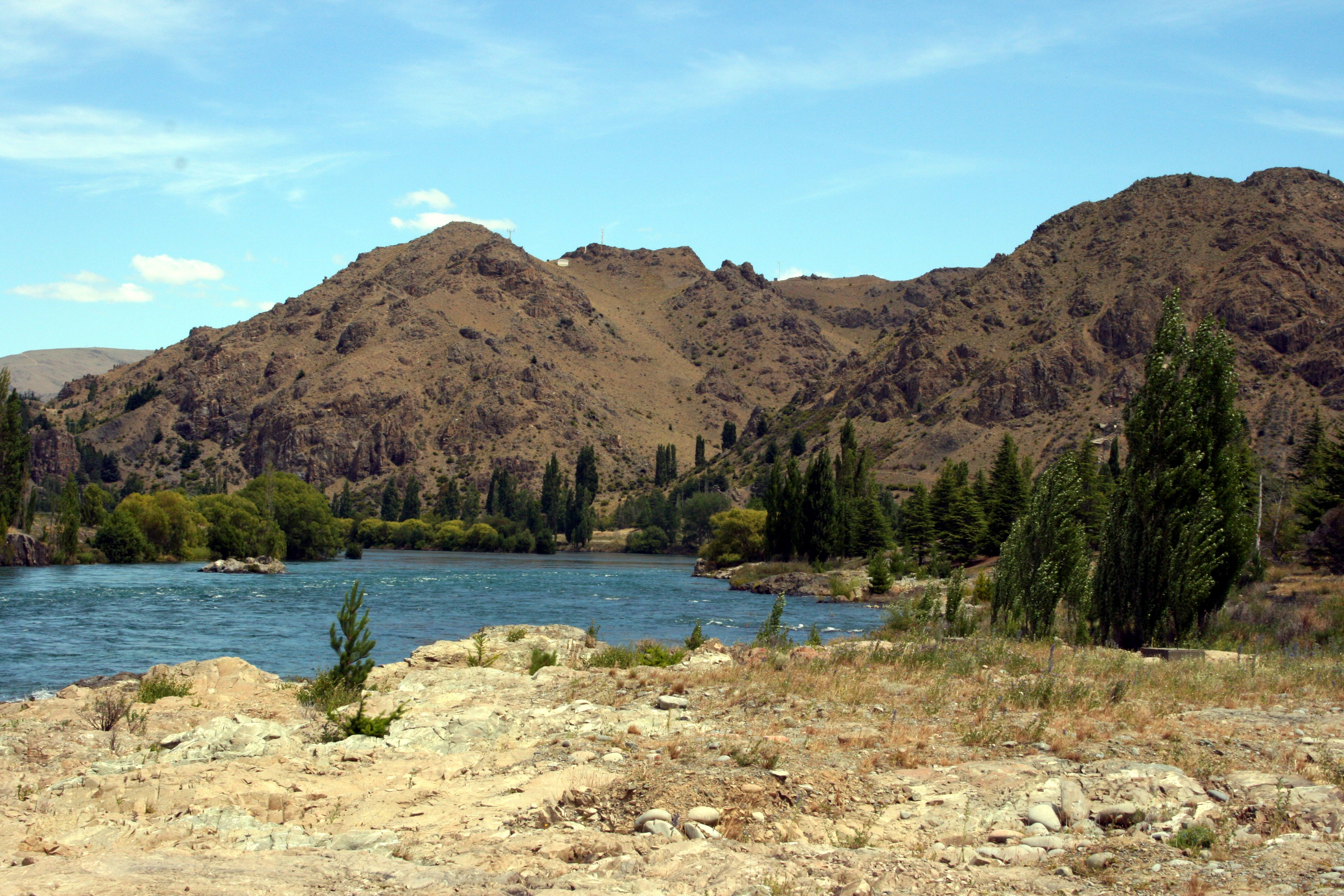

- Location within New Zealand
- Location: Waimate and Waitaki Districts, Canterbury region, South Island
- Coordinates: 44.6208°S 170.3022°E
- Lake type: Reservoir
- Primary inflows: Waitaki
- Primary outflows: Waitaki
- Basin countries: New Zealand
- Surface area: 29 km^{2} (11 sq mi)
- Surface elevation: 268 m (879 ft)

Lake Aviemore or Mahi Tikumu is a man-made lake in New Zealand's South Island, part of the Waitaki hydroelectric scheme. Immediately upstream is Lake Benmore and downstream Lake Waitaki. Aviemore lies on both sides of the border between the Waimate and Waitaki districts.

It is part of the traditional boundary of the Canterbury and Otago regions, although, officially, the border has been moved southward to include the lake, as well as the entire northwestern portion of the Waitaki District in the Canterbury Region. The Otematata settlement situated on State Highway 83 is just west of the lake, and was built in 1958 as a base for the construction of the Aviemore and Benmore Dams. Closer to the lake the old village Wharekuri which encompasses Aviemore was populous in the 1860s.

The Aviemore Dam, completed in 1968, is the newest of the three dams on the Waitaki river. It is made out of both earth and concrete.

By continuing the sinuous course of the river after the lake, one encounters Parsons Rock, named after Reverend J.C. Andrew (The Parson) who usually gave Christmas sermon there. A story goes to say that stolen gold taken from the Wharekuri Hotel was hidden near Parsons Rock. The suspects were to be apprehended but no money was ever found by the authorities in the hiding place.

In both Lake Aviemore and Benmore, one can fish salmon and trout year round except in September. Two main events are held on Lake Aviemore, there is the Labour weekend Aviemore Classic Trailer yacht race and the Windsurfing Championships in January.
