= Ohau =

Ohau or Ōhau may refer to the following in New Zealand:

In the Manawatū-Whanganui Region

- Ōhau, semi-rural community in the Manawatū-Whanganui region
- Ohau railway station (former) in the settlement of Ōhau
- Ōhau River (Manawatū-Whanganui)

In the Canterbury Region

- Ben Ohau, a mountain in the South Island
- Ben Ohau Range
- Ōhau (skifield)
- Lake Ōhau
- Lake Ohau Alpine Village
- Ōhau River (Canterbury)
- Ōhau A power station
- Ōhau B power station
- Ōhau C power station

Elsewhere

- The Ohau Channel, in the Bay of Plenty, linking Lake Rotorua and Lake Rotoiti
- Ōhau / West Island the third largest of Manawatāwhi / Three Kings Islands
- Ohau Peak, a peak in Antarctica
