= Twizel =

Town in the South Island of New Zealand

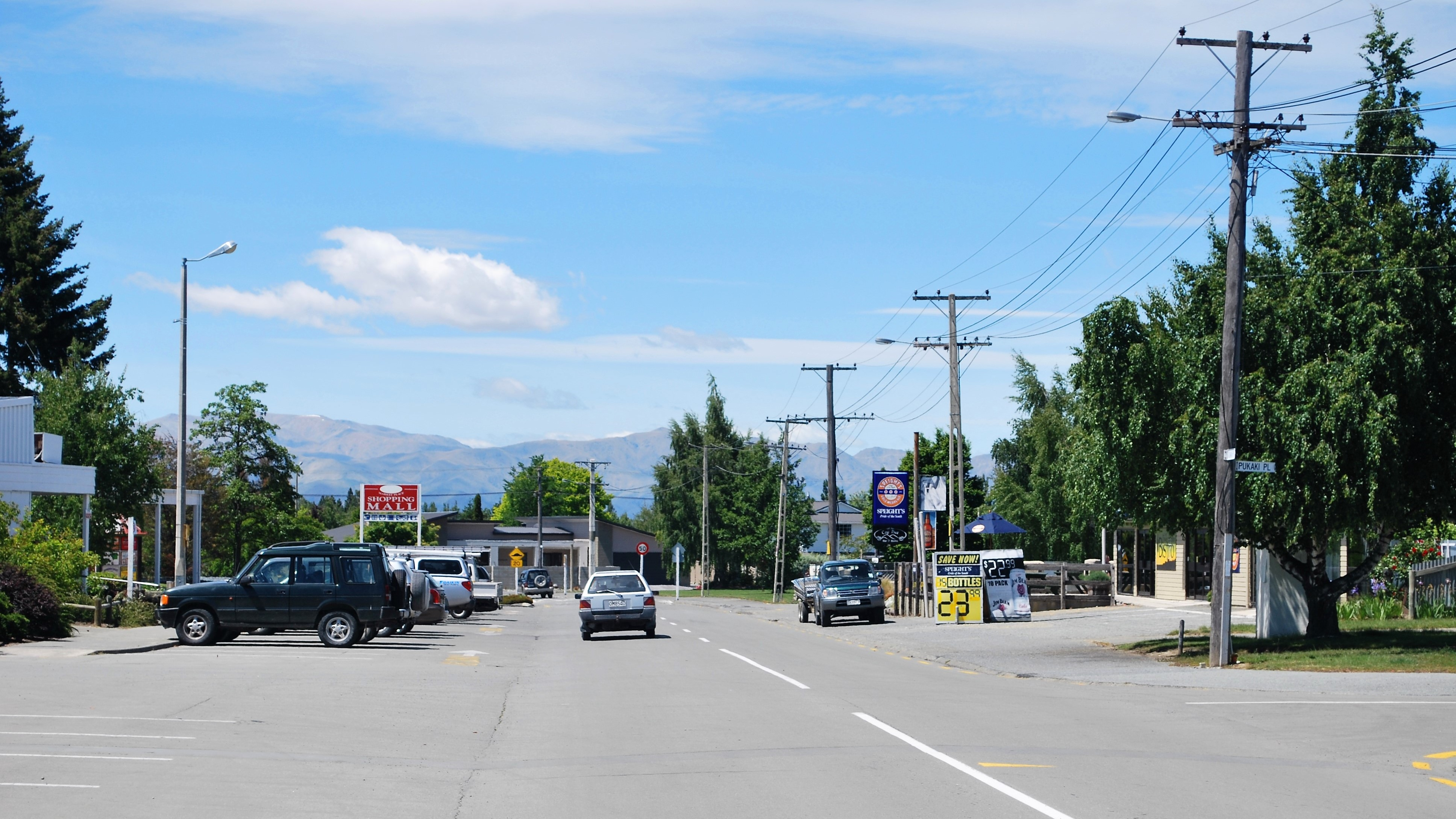
- Interactive map of Twizel
- Coordinates: 44°15′S 170°06′E
- Country: New Zealand
- Region: Canterbury
- Territorial authority: Mackenzie District
- Ward: Pukaki Ward
- Community: Twizel Community
- Founded: 1968
- Electorates: Waitaki; Te Tai Tonga (Māori)

Government
  - Territorial authority: Mackenzie District Council
  - Regional council: Environment Canterbury
  - Mayor of Mackenzie: Scott Aronsen
  - Waitaki MP: Miles Anderson
  - Te Tai Tonga MP: Tākuta Ferris

Area
  - Total: 15.54 km^{2} (6.00 sq mi)
- Elevation: 470 m (1,540 ft)

Population (June 2025)
  - Total: 1,790
  - Density: 115/km^{2} (298/sq mi)
- Time zone: UTC+12 (NZST)
  - Summer (DST): UTC+13 (NZDT)
- Postcode(s): 7901
- Area code: 03

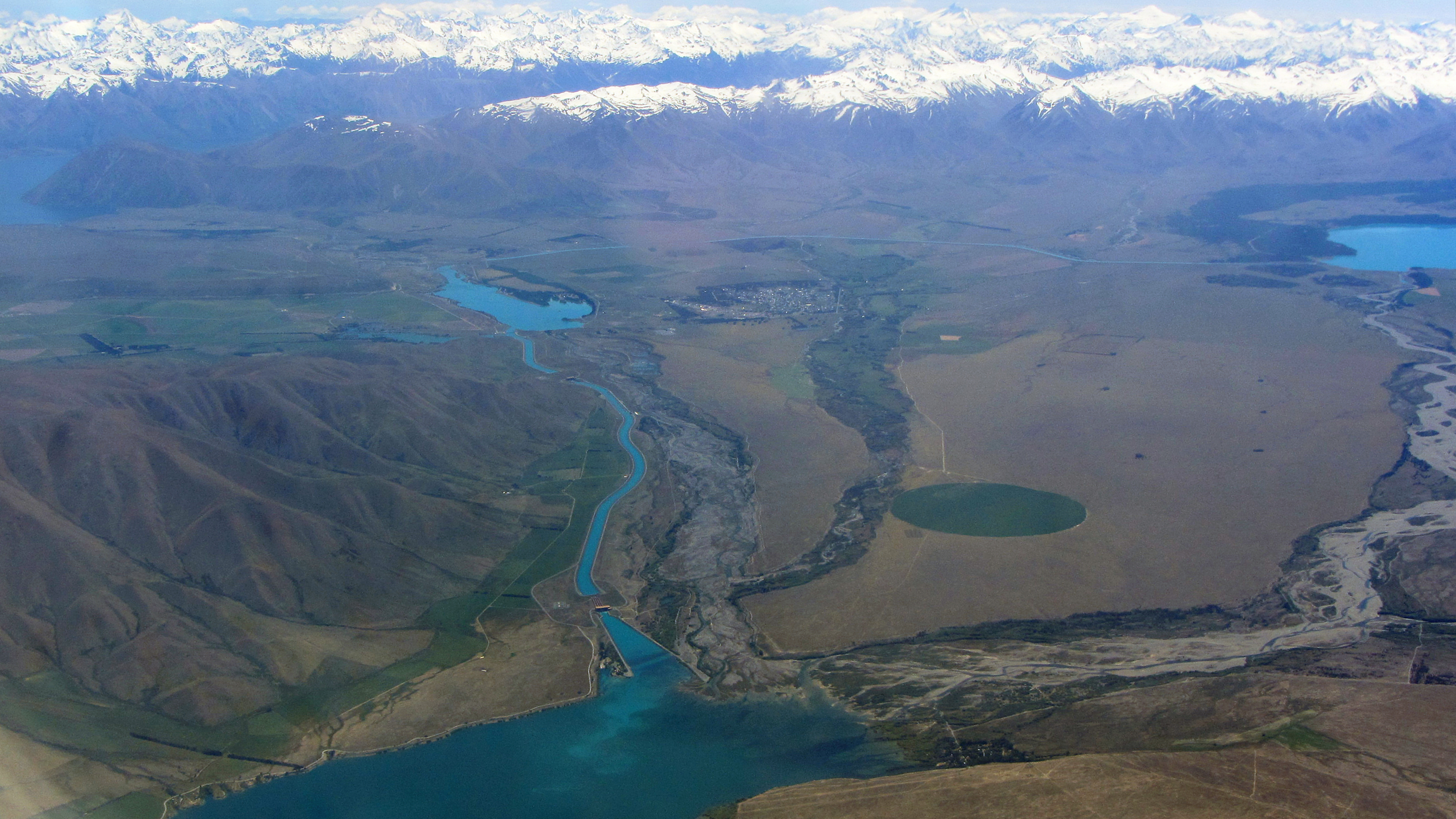
Twizel (centre distance) from the air, alongside Lake Ruataniwha. Lake Benmore is seen in the foreground.

Twizel (/ˈtwaɪzəl/) is the largest town in the Mackenzie District, in the Canterbury Region of the South Island of New Zealand. The town was founded in 1968 to house construction workers on the Upper Waitaki Hydroelectric Scheme. Today, Twizel is a service and tourist town for visitors to the area. It has a resident population of 1,790 (June 2025); during the summer, holidaymakers nearly triple the town's population.

Nearby Lake Ruataniwha supports rowing, sailing and water skiing. Twizel is 37 km (29 minutes drive) east of Lake Ōhau village, 30 km (20 minutes drive) north of Omarama and 60 km (42 minutes drive) south of Lake Tekapo.

== History ==
=== Hydro town ===
The present town was built in 1968 by the Ministry of Works and Development as a greenfields project to house workers constructing the Upper Waitaki hydroelectricity scheme. The name comes from the nearby Twizel River, in turn named for Twizel Bridge in Northumberland by John Turnbull Thomson, Chief Surveyor of Otago in the mid-19th century.

The Waitaki hydro scheme consisted of 50 kilometres (31 mi) of canals, two dams, and four powerhouses (Tekapo B, Ōhau A, B and C), and the formation of Lake Ruataniwha, producing 848 MW of electricity. At the height of the project in the 1970s, population peaked of around 6,000.

At the time when the construction of the Upper Waitaki hydroelectricity scheme peaked, roughly in 1976, there were 800 cabins for single people and 1,224 family homes in Twizel. These mostly belonged to the Ministry of Works and Development to house the 1,900 employees of the Upper Waitaki hydroelectricity scheme.

The town was laid out in a 'Scandinavian' fashion, featuring looping roads and pedestrian ways, making it usually far more direct to walk than use a car. Shops, school, and recreational parkland formed a hub in the centre of the town, around which the residential area were built. A previous version of this layout had been tried at Otematata. Accommodation was highly segregated: in addition to single men's quarters in the middle of town, there was a series of different houses available, with the smallest for workers, staff houses for teachers and professionals, and the largest for engineers and other high-status residents.

As the intention was for the town to revert to farmland, there were many temporary features. For example, instead of putting in kerbing, channels, and footpaths at the edge of the road, a single expanse of seal was contoured in a very flat 'W' shape: the seal was highest at the outer edge (footpath) and in the middle (centreline), with a lower area serving as a channel and delineation between the roadway and footpath. Likewise, most of the town's telephone local loop is strung above ground to save the task of burying and then removing the lines. Most houses were prefabricated, and intended to be portable. Some were brought from Otematata, and some were later moved to Clyde for the next hydroelectricity project.

=== Hydroelectric scheme winds down ===
Government ministers argued that the town was intended to be temporary and eventually demolished. The government ministers saw Twizel as a financial liability. In October 1981, 100 houses had been reserved with the intention to transport them to Aramoana in expectation that the proposed aluminium smelter would be built. Several overseas investors offered to buy the whole town and develop it for tourism. One such investor, had plans to turn it into a "Las Vegas style casino town".

By 1982, the population had fallen to around 3,500 people. During 1983, the Ministry of Works and Development started to sell houses and garages. Several hundred were sold and transported away by new owners.

However, in 1983, as the hydroelectric project was winding up and finally ended in 1986. Residents successfully fought to save the town itself. The town was handed over to the Mackenzie County Council. The government offered 325 houses, 100 further sections, community facilities and a cash grant to the council. The Mackenzie County Council then offered these for sale. In 1984, the Mackenzie County Council eventually took over 540 houses and 14 shops as well as the 100 sections and community facilities.

=== Post hydro town ===
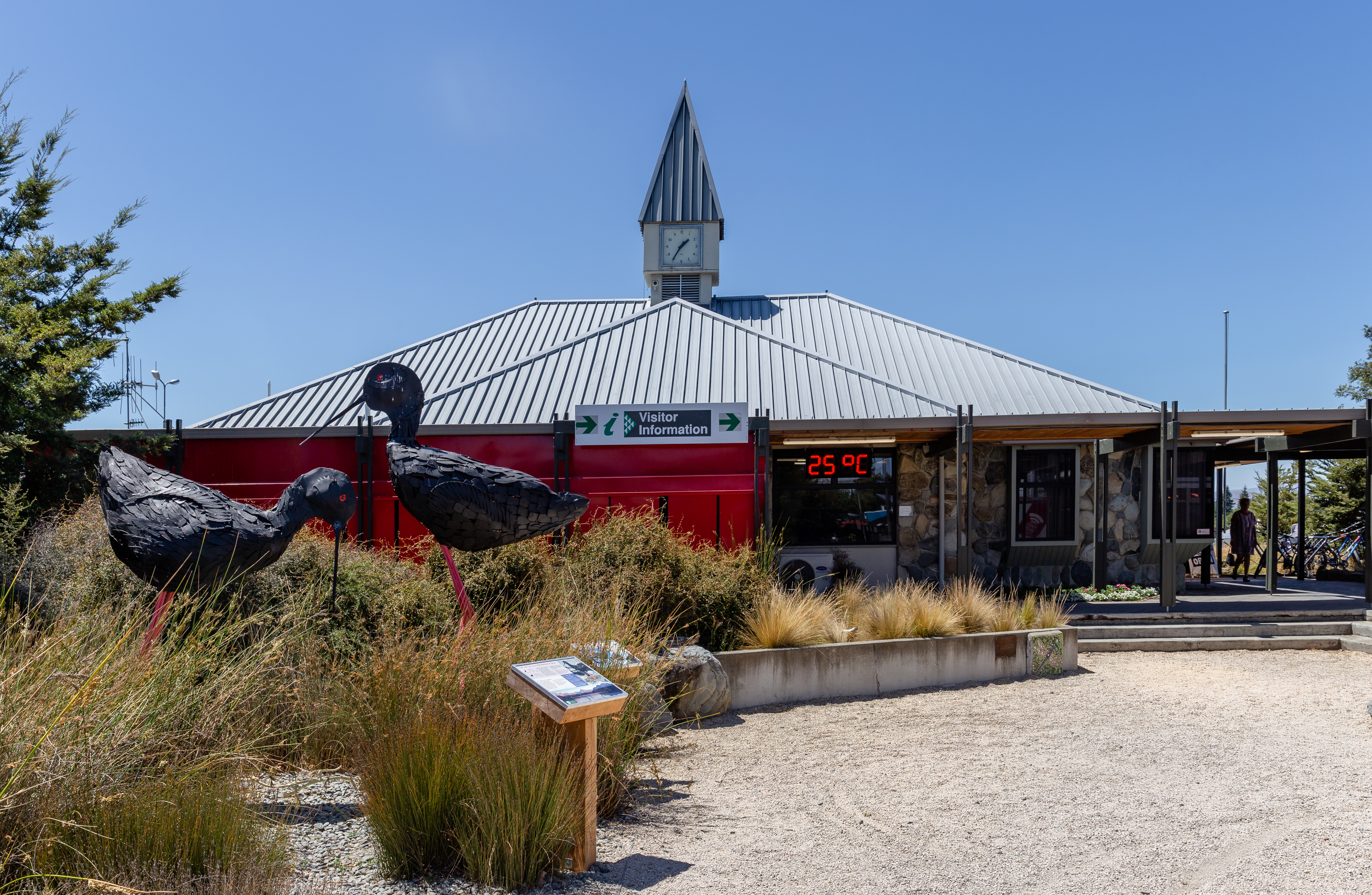
Two statues of black stilts (kakī) in the town centre, near the tourist information centre (background)

With the local government reorganisation that occurred in 1989, Twizel came under the auspices of the Mackenzie District Council.

With the construction phase completed of the Upper Waitaki hydroelectricity scheme, the makeup of the town in the late 1980s was significantly different. The population (of 1179 people in 1986, declining to 1017 people in 1991) was now made of those working on the operations side of the hydroelectric scheme, working in the service sector, retired and those taking advantage of the cheap housing. Some houses became holiday homes for people living out of town. Tourism developed slowly in the 1990s with a number of hotels and motels being built.

Twizel was the base for some of the Electricity Corporation of New Zealand operations workforce. In 1999, Meridian Energy, which had inherited the local assets, moved its operations base from Twizel to Christchurch.

In 2009, the community were consulted in a workshop to identify issues and gaps in services that residents felt existed. Issues identified included the viability of emergency services, accessibility of health services, residential care for the elderly, access to dental care and drug and alcohol services.

In 2015, the new $1.8 million Twizel Medical Centre was completed. This included a helipad in order to transport sick patients to hospital via helicopter. Meridian Energy provided $150,000 funding for the helipad.

A building boom occurred in 2017 with five new subdivisions all sold and a busy construction industry.

Financial support to build an aviary near Twizel in order to support the conservation of the black stilt (kakī) was provided in 2017 by the Sangreal Foundation. The captive breeding programme in Twizel (and Christchurch) was a success in 2021 with 150 juvenile black stilt (kakī) being released into the wild. The 2021 breeding season was also deemed a success with eighteen black stilt chicks hatching over the Christmas period.

By early 2019, tourism played an important part in the economy of Twizel. By this stage, tourists had spent one million overnight stays in the town, unemployment was sitting at less than 1% and employers could not recruit for jobs. Twizel would get very busy during the summer months and during rowing events.

Twizel's population is expected to grow by 2.6% each year between 2020 and 2050. with the population expected to grow to 3395 people in the year 2050. In October 2020, the Mackenzie District Council presented three options for how the town could evolve with the growth. Local residents provided negative feedback to the plans with complaints that they were too similar and said that the population growth was underestimated.

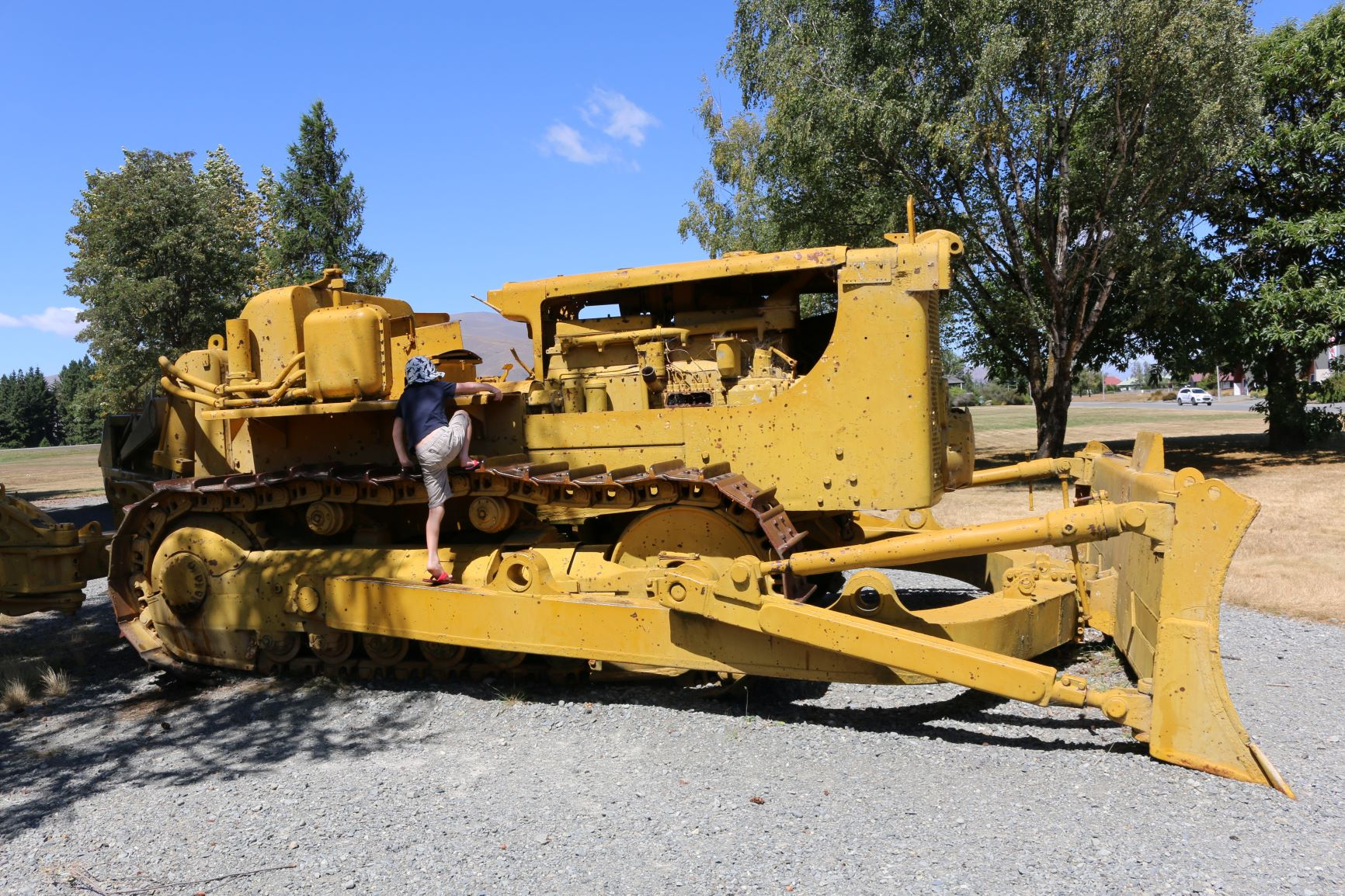
Heavy machinery from building the hydroelectric schemes at the entrance to Twizel (2019)

In January 2021, there were concerns that the display of earth moving vehicles, that was used in the Waitaki hydroelectric power projects, at the entrance to the town were unsafe. A report recommended that the vehicles were either fenced off or brought up to the standards that playgrounds are expected to be at.

In May 2021, work began on a $6.5 million project to replace the asbestos cement water pipes with polyethylene pipes as the old pipes had reached the end of their useful life.

== Demographics ==
Twizel is described by Statistics New Zealand as a small urban area, and covers 15.54 km^{2} (6.00 sq mi) and had an estimated population of 1,790 as of June 2025, with a population density of 115 people per km^{2} (298/sq mi).

Historical population
Year	Pop.	±% p.a.
2006	1,041	—
2013	1,194	+1.98%
2018	1,515	+4.88%
2023	1,674	+2.02%

Twizel had a population of 1,674 in the 2023 New Zealand census, an increase of 159 people (10.5%) since the 2018 census, and an increase of 480 people (40.2%) since the 2013 census. There were 900 males, 762 females, and 12 people of other genders in 792 dwellings. 2.9% of people identified as LGBTIQ+. The median age was 44.2 years (compared with 38.1 years nationally). There were 255 people (15.2%) aged under 15 years, 270 (16.1%) aged 15 to 29, 780 (46.6%) aged 30 to 64, and 369 (22.0%) aged 65 or older.

People could identify as more than one ethnicity. The results were 85.3% European (Pākehā); 11.3% Māori; 1.6% Pasifika; 7.3% Asian; 2.2% Middle Eastern, Latin American and African New Zealanders (MELAA); and 3.4% other, which includes people giving their ethnicity as "New Zealander". English was spoken by 97.5%, Māori by 2.7%, Samoan by 0.2%, and other languages by 11.5%. No language could be spoken by 1.6% (e.g. too young to talk). New Zealand Sign Language was known by 0.2%. The percentage of people born overseas was 23.1, compared with 28.8% nationally.

Religious affiliations were 30.1% Christian, 2.2% Hindu, 0.2% Islam, 0.2% Māori religious beliefs, 0.5% Buddhist, 0.4% New Age, and 1.4% other religions. People who answered that they had no religion were 59.1%, and 5.4% of people did not answer the census question.

Of those at least 15 years old, 291 (20.5%) people had a bachelor's or higher degree, 798 (56.2%) had a post-high school certificate or diploma, and 333 (23.5%) people exclusively held high school qualifications. The median income was $41,400, compared with $41,500 nationally. 123 people (8.7%) earned over $100,000 compared to 12.1% nationally. The employment status of those at least 15 was 792 (55.8%) full-time, 243 (17.1%) part-time, and 15 (1.1%) unemployed.

== Tourism and activities ==
Twizel is now a service town for the agricultural sector and tourist town for visitors.

=== Fishing ===
There are many options around Twizel for fishing. These include many mountain streams, Lakes Ruataniwha, Ōhau, and the hydroelectric canals from Lake Tekapo to Lake Pukaki and those from Lake Ōhau on to Lake Benmore. Within the canals, salmon farms provide plenty of food for wild salmon and trout. Many large fish have been caught with trout weighing in excess of 4.5 kilograms common. A trout caught in the Ōhau canal in October 2020 weighing 20.1 kg was a world record catch. Twizel also hosts an annual Twizel Salmon & Wine Festival each February.

=== Rowing ===
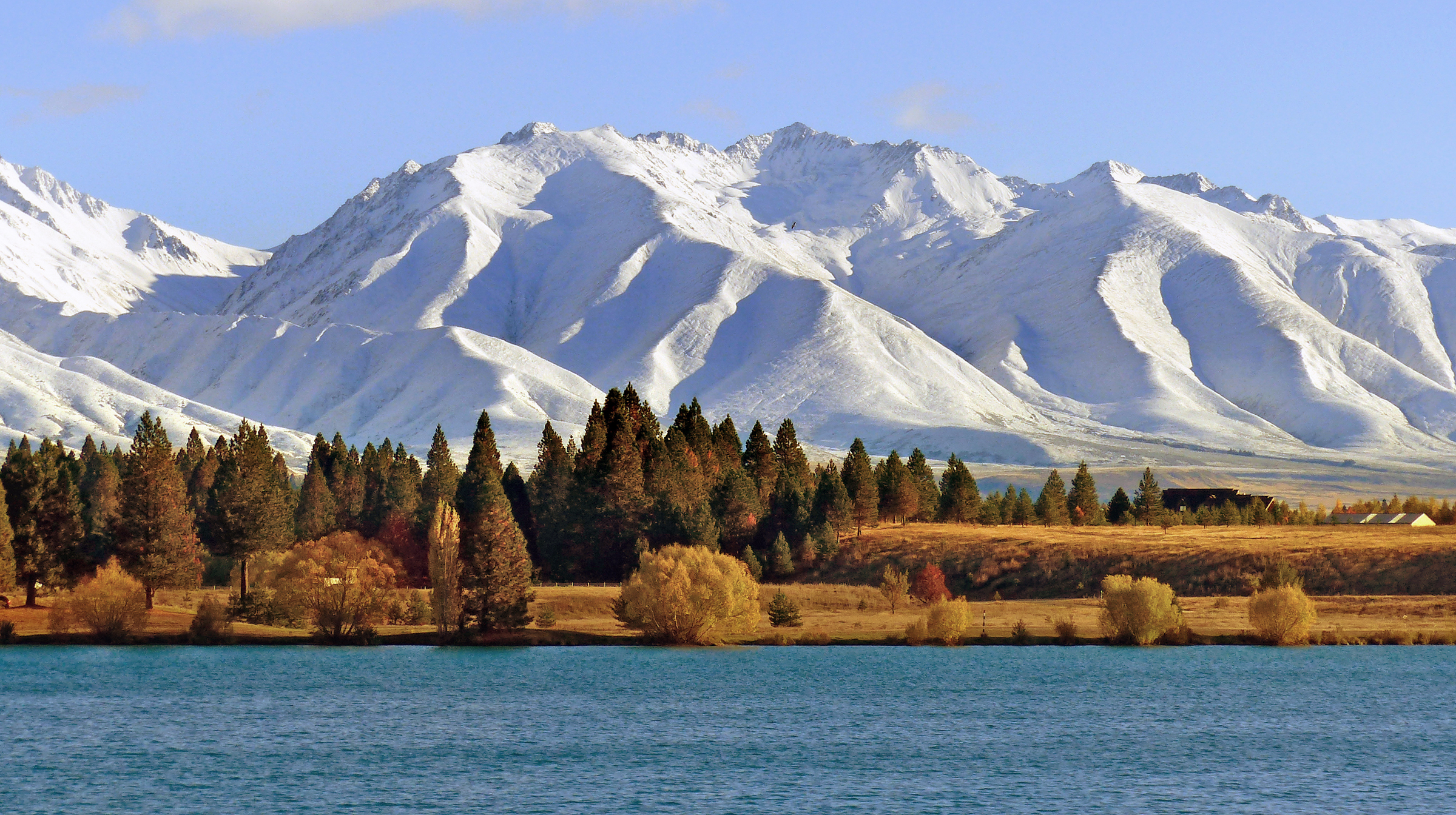
Twizel, surrounded by trees with the Southern Alps in the background

Lake Ruataniwha is used for sailing and water skiing. Several rowing events are held on the lake, including the Maadi Cup and the New Zealand Rowing Championships. The Twizel Rowing Club is based at Lake Ruataniwha, with club members competing in all age groups.

=== Skiing ===
The nearby Ōhau Skifield and the Round Hill Ski Area attract winter tourists. The Twizel Snow Club supports local children to build on skills and knowledge and train for skiing and snowboarding competitions.

=== Walking and tramping ===
The Twizel River Trail is a 24 kilometre walk around the outskirts of Twizel. Other close by walking tracks include the 15 minute long Ben Ohau Wetland track and the four hour long Darts Bush Stream track. It is also possible to climb Ben Ohau. The start of the track in 23 kilometres outside of Twizel via the Glen Lyon road.

=== Biking ===
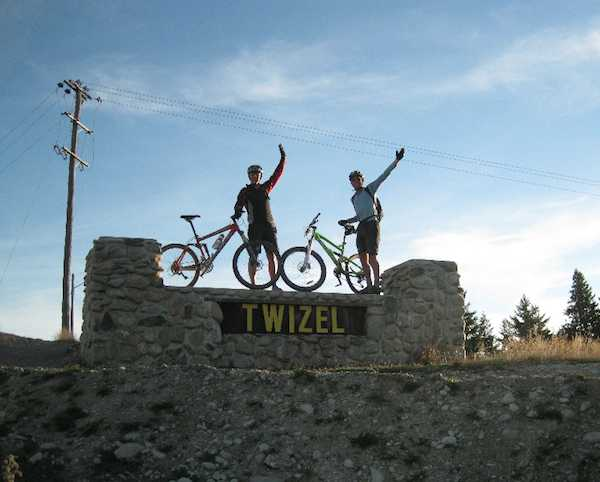
Cyclists in Twizel, New Zealand

Twizel is also on the route of the Alps to Ocean Cycle Trail.

Stage 2 of the Alps 2 Ocean runs from Lake Tekapo to Twizel. This 54 kilometre section takes riders past the Tekapo A power station and along the Tekapo Canal before skirting around the Lake Pukaki shoreline and across the Pukaki Flats to Twizel.

Stage 3 of the Alps 2 Ocean runs from Twizel to Lake Ōhau Lodge. This 38 kilometre section takes riders along the canal roads to the edge of Lake Ōhau. It then turns into an off-road trail which runs along the lake up to Lake Ōhau Lodge. This section is of an easy skill level, with little traffic. Points along the stage include the Pukaki and Ohau canals, views of Ben Ohau, Maori Swamp, the Ohau Weir and salmon fishing spots in the canals.

Other mountain biking trails around Twizel include the Dusky Trail. This is a 23 kilometre walking and biking track that is considered non technical (grade 2). When biking, it is best ridden in a clockwise direction starting at Fraser Stream. The Dusky Trail traverses the Ruataniwha Conservation Park. It also crosses Rhoboro, Pukaki Downs, and Ben Ohau stations on public easements. The views have been described as "massive" and showcasing the "big sky".

Twizel is home to the start of the annual Twizel to Timaru Cycle Classic. The 151 kilometre race was won in 2021 by Josh Rivett. The 2020 edition was won by Myles Gibson with Sharlotte Lucas coming second.

=== Astronomy ===
The area has one of the world's cleanest, driest, and darkest skies, and has long drawn astronomers to Twizel and the surrounding area, with several existing astro-tourism ventures, such as at Lake Tekapo and Omarama, catering to their needs during the development of two additional observatories in Twizel and at Mount Cook Village. Since 2012, Twizel has been a part of the Aoraki Mackenzie International Dark Sky Reserve, one of eight dark-sky places in New Zealand recognised by the International Dark-Sky Association.

== Climate ==
Twizel has an oceanic climate. It is typically mild and dry over the summer, with cold and frosty winters. Snow is not uncommon in Twizel and can fall in several months of the year. Twizel is often the coldest town in New Zealand during winter.

Climate data for Twizel (Pukaki Airport), elevation 461 m (1,512 ft), (1991–2020 normals, extremes 1972–present)
Month	Jan	Feb	Mar	Apr	May	Jun	Jul	Aug	Sep	Oct	Nov	Dec	Year
Record high °C (°F)	35.7 (96.3)	34.3 (93.7)	31.0 (87.8)	27.3 (81.1)	25.1 (77.2)	18.0 (64.4)	18.5 (65.3)	20.2 (68.4)	24.5 (76.1)	28.0 (82.4)	30.4 (86.7)	33.3 (91.9)	35.7 (96.3)
Mean daily maximum °C (°F)	24.6 (76.3)	24.6 (76.3)	21.5 (70.7)	16.7 (62.1)	12.1 (53.8)	7.1 (44.8)	7.2 (45.0)	10.6 (51.1)	14.7 (58.5)	17.6 (63.7)	19.9 (67.8)	22.7 (72.9)	16.6 (61.9)
Daily mean °C (°F)	16.6 (61.9)	16.2 (61.2)	13.5 (56.3)	9.5 (49.1)	6.1 (43.0)	2.0 (35.6)	1.8 (35.2)	4.3 (39.7)	7.4 (45.3)	10.1 (50.2)	12.3 (54.1)	14.9 (58.8)	9.6 (49.2)
Mean daily minimum °C (°F)	8.6 (47.5)	7.8 (46.0)	5.6 (42.1)	2.4 (36.3)	0.1 (32.2)	−3.1 (26.4)	−3.5 (25.7)	−2.0 (28.4)	0.1 (32.2)	2.6 (36.7)	4.8 (40.6)	7.1 (44.8)	2.5 (36.6)
Record low °C (°F)	−1.1 (30.0)	−3.5 (25.7)	−4.2 (24.4)	−7.0 (19.4)	−10.5 (13.1)	−19.8 (−3.6)	−14.7 (5.5)	−9.1 (15.6)	−8.5 (16.7)	−4.9 (23.2)	−4.7 (23.5)	−2.4 (27.7)	−19.8 (−3.6)
Average rainfall mm (inches)	55.0 (2.17)	55.0 (2.17)	50.2 (1.98)	65.8 (2.59)	57.3 (2.26)	46.3 (1.82)	48.9 (1.93)	51.4 (2.02)	45.4 (1.79)	55.4 (2.18)	64.4 (2.54)	63.2 (2.49)	658.3 (25.94)
Source: NIWA

== Transport ==
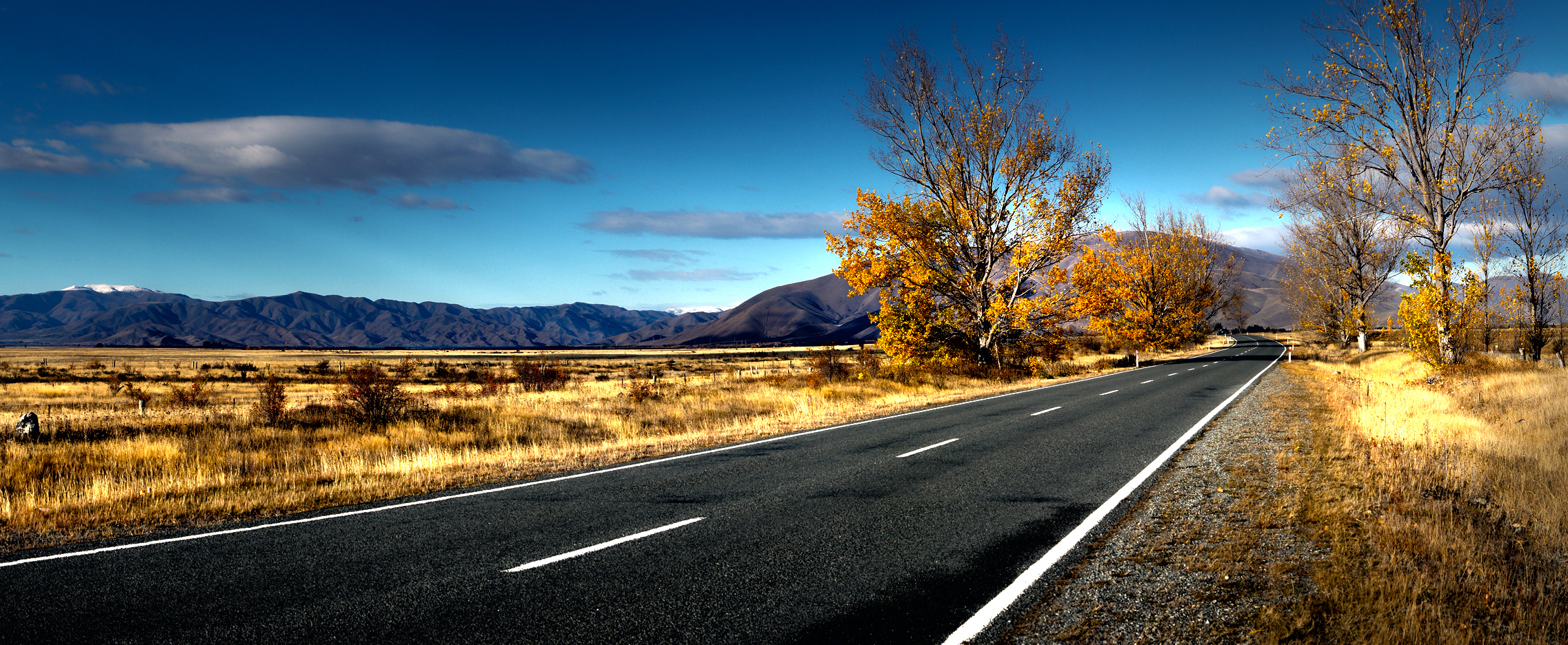
The scenic State Highway 8, just north of Twizel and adjacent to Pukaki Airport

=== Road ===
Twizel sits immediately to the west of State Highway 8 which is the main highway serving the town. Twizel is served by InterCity coaches with regular service to Christchurch and Queenstown. The Cook Connection bus service also provides connections to Mount Cook village from Twizel.

=== Airport ===
Twizel is served by the nearby Pukaki Airport.

== Governance ==
Twizel is part of the Waitaki electorate with the current member of parliament being Miles Anderson of the National Party. Previously, Twizel was in the Aoraki electorate. Local government is the responsibility of the Mackenzie District Council. Twizel also has representation through the Twizel Community Board, which consists of four elected members and an appointed Mackenzie District council member.

== Amenities ==
=== Swimming pool ===
The Twizel Community Pool is located on Market Place next to the Twizel Events Centre. The outdoor complex contains three pools, a 33-metre pool for lane swimming with a slide, a smaller children's pool and a toddler's pool. The Twizel Community Pools open in late November each year.

Management of the pool was awarded to Belgravia Leisure after a report written in September 2020 for the Mackenzie District Council found health and safety issues with the way that the council was running the pool. Plans exist in 2021 to heat the pools as community feedback was almost unanimous that the pools were too cold.

=== Golf course ===
The Ben Ohau golf club is a nine-hole golf course in Twizel.

=== Retail ===
The retail sector in Twizel is concentrated around the pedestrianised Market Place. There are two Four Square supermarkets in Twizel. Twizel is also reputed to have New Zealand's smallest bookstore.

=== Library ===
The Twizel Community Library is located on Mount Cook Street, just off Market Place. It is open Monday to Friday and Saturday mornings.

=== Twizel events centre ===
The Twizel events centre was built in 2001. It is located at the Market Place in the centre of town. The events centre includes a sports hall, community room plus kitchen and a theatre hall. It never received a Code Compliance Certificate. It was at risk of being closed down in 2021 with the discovery of asbestos and other safety concerns such as broken ventilation systems, improperly installed fire dampers, concerns with theatre seating, lack of seismic restraints, non-compliant fire safety equipment, non-functioning emergency lighting, and a locked fire exit. Mackenzie mayor Graham Smith said of the building “I really want to see this building put right. We need to address it".

=== Church ===
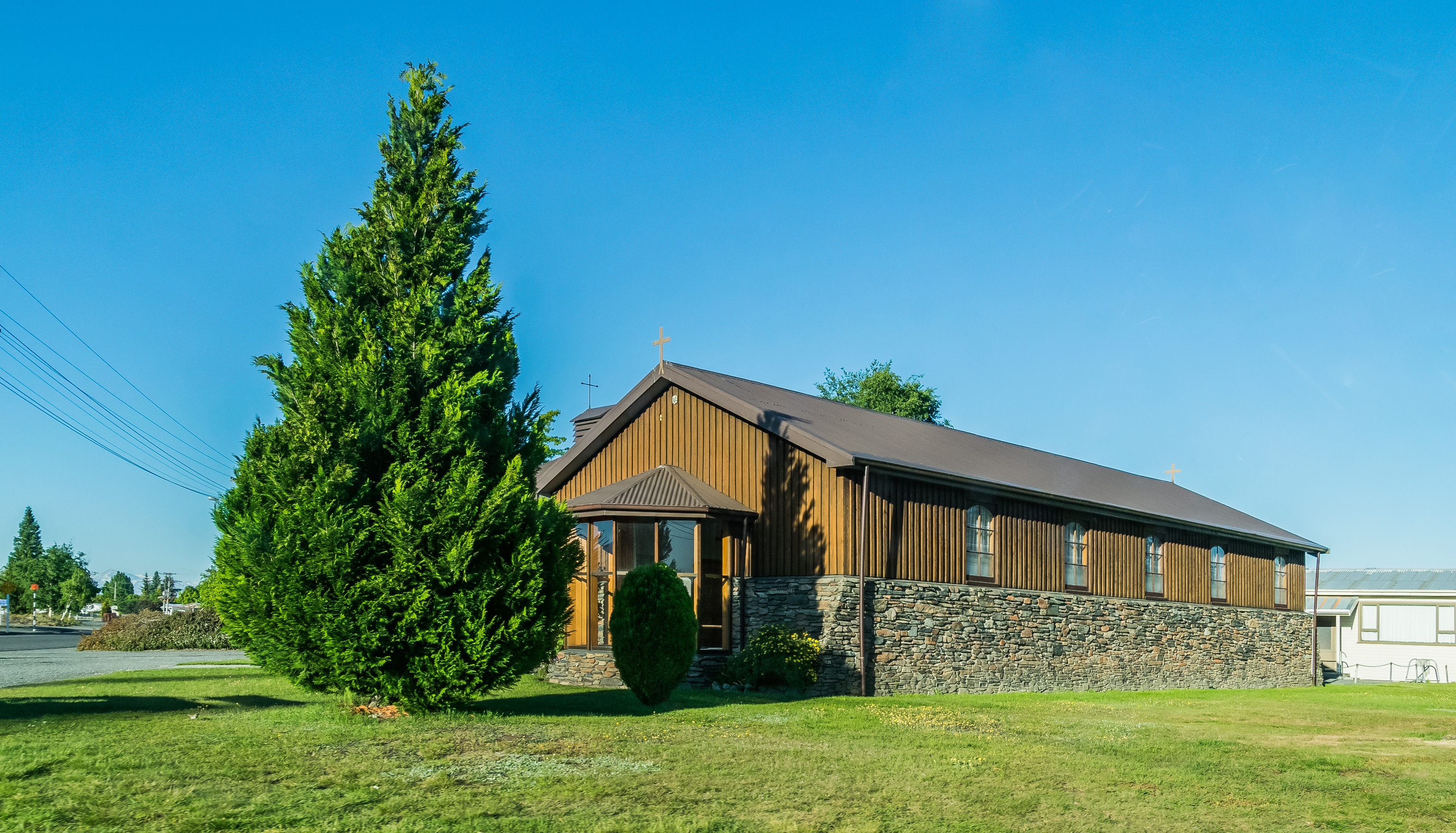
All Saints Church

All Saints, the Pukaki cooperating parish church, is located at 52 Mackenzie Drive. It is used by various Christian denominations for services.

== Education ==
Twizel Area School is the sole school in Twizel, catering for Year 1 to 13 students (ages 5 to 18). Twizel Primary School and Twizel High School were established in 1970. These were merged in 1986 to form the Twizel Area School. The co-educational school has a roll of 251 students as of July 2026. In April 2020, a commissioner was made responsible for the governance of Twizel Area School. The appointment of the commissioner was made at the request of its board of trustees. In March 2021, Twizel Area School returned to being run by the Board of Trustee with the commissioner stating that "The future of the school is bright and there is a lot to look forward to".

In July 2020, the New Zealand government announced a $21 million rebuild of the Twizel Area School. The relocatable classrooms would be replaced. The rebuild was complete in early 2026.

== In popular culture ==
In the movie The Lord of the Rings: The Return of the King, the battle of the Pelennor Fields was filmed near Twizel, as was a scene in The Hobbit trilogy of movies where Bilbo and the Dwarves are chased across the plains by Warg riders. In 2013, the Michael Fassbender movie Slow West was partly filmed around Twizel. A short film called "Tinsel over Twizel" has been used as a proof of concept in order to then make a romantic comedy full-length movie to be filmed on location in Twizel.
