= Ministry of Works and Development =

Ministry in the New Zealand Government

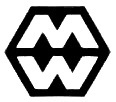
- Ministry of Works logo in the 1970s-90s

Agency overview
- Formed: 1871
- Dissolved: 1993
- Superseding agencies: Works Consultancy Services; Works Civil Construction
- Minister responsible: Minister of Works

The New Zealand Ministry of Works and Development, formerly the Department of Public Works and often referred to as the Public Works Department or PWD, was founded in 1871 and disestablished and sold off in 1988. The Ministry had its own Cabinet-level responsible minister, the Minister of Works or Minister of Public Works.

Historically, the state has played an important part in developing the New Zealand economy. For many years the Public Works Department (which became the Ministry of Works in 1948 and the Ministry of Works and Development in 1974) undertook most major construction work in New Zealand, including roads, railways and power stations. After the reform of the state sector, beginning in 1984, the ministry disappeared and its remnants now have to compete for government work.

The Ministry of Works and Development was disestablished in 1988 and a Residual Management Unit continued to oversee the Ministry's operations and assets until formally ending in 1993. It was abolished via the Ministry of Works and Development Abolition Act 1988.

== Structure and operations ==
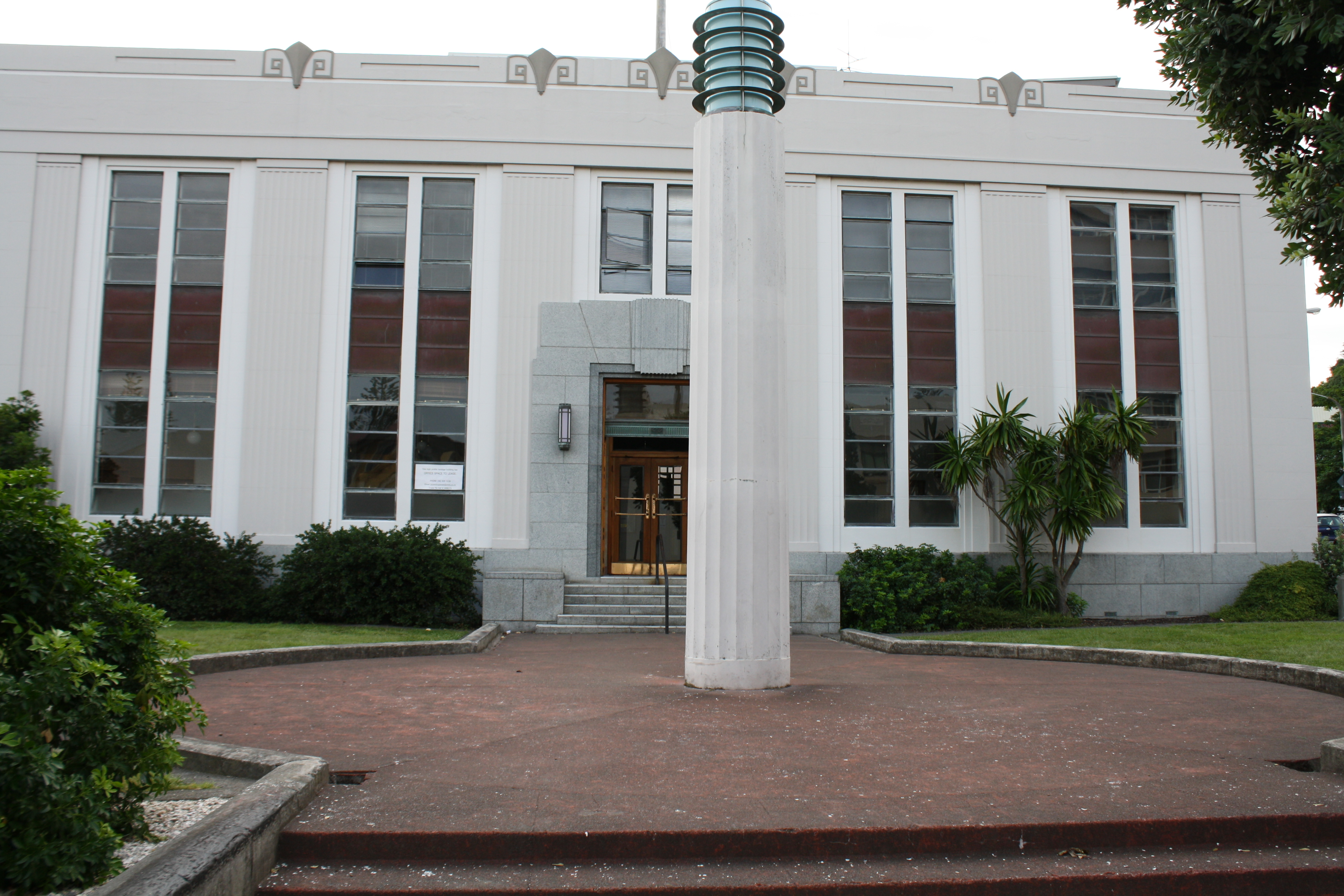
The former Ministry of Works Building in Napier, built in 1938 in Art Deco and Stripped Classical style

The Head Office of the Ministry was in the Vogel Building in Wellington, named after former Premier Sir Julius Vogel, who helped create the Public Works Department during his term in office, through the Immigration and Public Works Act 1870. This building held the Vogel Computer, one of the largest in New Zealand and used by several government departments for engineering work. The Ministry moved to the Vogel Building in about 1966 from the Old Government Building on Lambton Quay.

During the Great Depression the department was relied on by the government to provide unemployment relief, constructing infrastructure mostly using human labour at reduced salaries. The First Labour Government resumed the department's original function as the development arm of the state although from May 1936 (when a new three year public works programme was announced) whence relief work for the unemployed not only continued but all relief workers were placed on the standard £4 a week rate of pay.

The ministry was renamed the Ministry of Works on 16 March 1943 under the Ministry of Works Act. This was to reflect the extended wartime functions, when the Minister explained it was, "to ensure that, whilst the building and constructional potential of the country is limited by war and immediate post-war conditions, it is assembled and utilized in the most efficient manner from the point of view of the national interest".

In 1944 the ministry was involved in the "great furniture scandal" when asked to order items of furniture for the new Legation in Moscow, to be headed by Charles Boswell. The list of items to be shipped from New Zealand to Moscow (via Tehran and Central Asia) included 40 armchairs, 10 couches, a billiard table, and palm stands. Apparently made after looking at furniture in Government House and ministerial houses, the order could have seated almost the entire House of Representatives; it was cancelled by Prime Minister Peter Fraser.

During the latter years of the Ministry there were seven District Offices (Auckland, Hamilton, Wanganui, Napier, Wellington, Christchurch and Dunedin) each headed by a District Commissioner of Works. In each District there were a number of Residency Offices (headed by a Resident Engineer) and each had a number of Depots. The primary purpose of this 6000 strong workforce was the maintenance of the existing and planning and construction of replacement sections of the State Highway network. In addition there were Project Offices set up for a particular purpose, such as to build a power project, airport, tunnel or irrigation scheme.

== Dissolution ==
While the policy functions were either disestablished or passed on to other Government departments, the commercial operations were set up as Works and Development Services Corporation (a state-owned enterprise) and the computing bureau and the buildings maintenance units were sold. The corporation had two main subsidiaries, Works Consultancy Services and Works Civil Construction. These were sold in 1996 and became Opus International Consultants and Works Infrastructure respectively, and the corporation was disestablished.

== Major projects ==
=== Military equipment ===
- Bob Semple tank (1941)

=== Military installations ===
- Ohakea and Whenuapai aircraft hangars (1939)
- Stony Batter (1944)
- Wrights Hill Fortress (1943)

=== Electricity ===
==== Projects ====
- Waitaki Dam (Completed 1935)
- Roxburgh Dam
- Tekapo A (Completed 1951)
- Benmore Dam (1965)
- Aviemore Dam (1968)
- Tekapo B
- Ohau A, B and C.
- Lake Ruataniwha
- Clyde Dam (Completed 1989)
- Te Anau and Manapouri Lake Control Structures (1971-1974)
- Huntly Power Station (Commissioned 1983)

In the North Island, the Tongariro Power Scheme was completed between 1964 and 1983.

=== Railways ===
==== History ====
Under the Public Works Act 1876, the Department of Public Works was responsible for the operation of New Zealand's railway network from 1876 until 1880, when operations were transferred to the New Zealand Railways Department. This transfer did not end the PWD's railway operations, as it still operated railway lines when under construction, sometimes providing revenue services prior to the official transfer of the line to the Railways Department. The PWD owned its own locomotives and rolling stock, some second-hand from the Railways Department, and it operated some small railway lines that were never transferred to the Railways Department. One example is a 6.4 km branch line built in 1928 from near the terminus of the Railways Department's Kurow Branch to a hydro-electric dam project on the Waitaki River. This branch was not solely used to service the dam project; the PWD used its own rolling stock to provide a service for school children who attended school in Kurow, and occasionally special Railways Department trains operated on the line with PWD motive power, including a 1931 sightseeing excursion to view the under-construction dam. This line was removed in April 1937 as the PWD no longer required it.

==== Projects ====
- North Island Main Trunk railway (completed 1908)
  - Raurimu Spiral (1898)
- Otira Tunnel (completed 1923)
- East Coast Main Trunk (completed 1928)
- Westfield deviation (completed 1929)
- Auckland railway station (1930)
- Stratford–Okahukura Line (completed 1932)
- Tawa Flat deviation (completed 1935)
- Kaimai Railway Tunnel (completed 1978)
- Wellington Urban Motorway (from 1965 to 1975) Project was stopped at Ghuznee Street, by the Government of the day.

== See also ==
- Minister of Works (New Zealand)
- The Vogel Era
- Opus International Group
- Works Infrastructure
- Downer EDI Works

== Notes ==
=== References ===
- By Design: A brief history of the Public Works Department Ministry of Works 1870-1970 by Rosslyn J. Noonan (1975, Crown Copyright)
