= Pokaka railway station =

Railway station in New Zealand

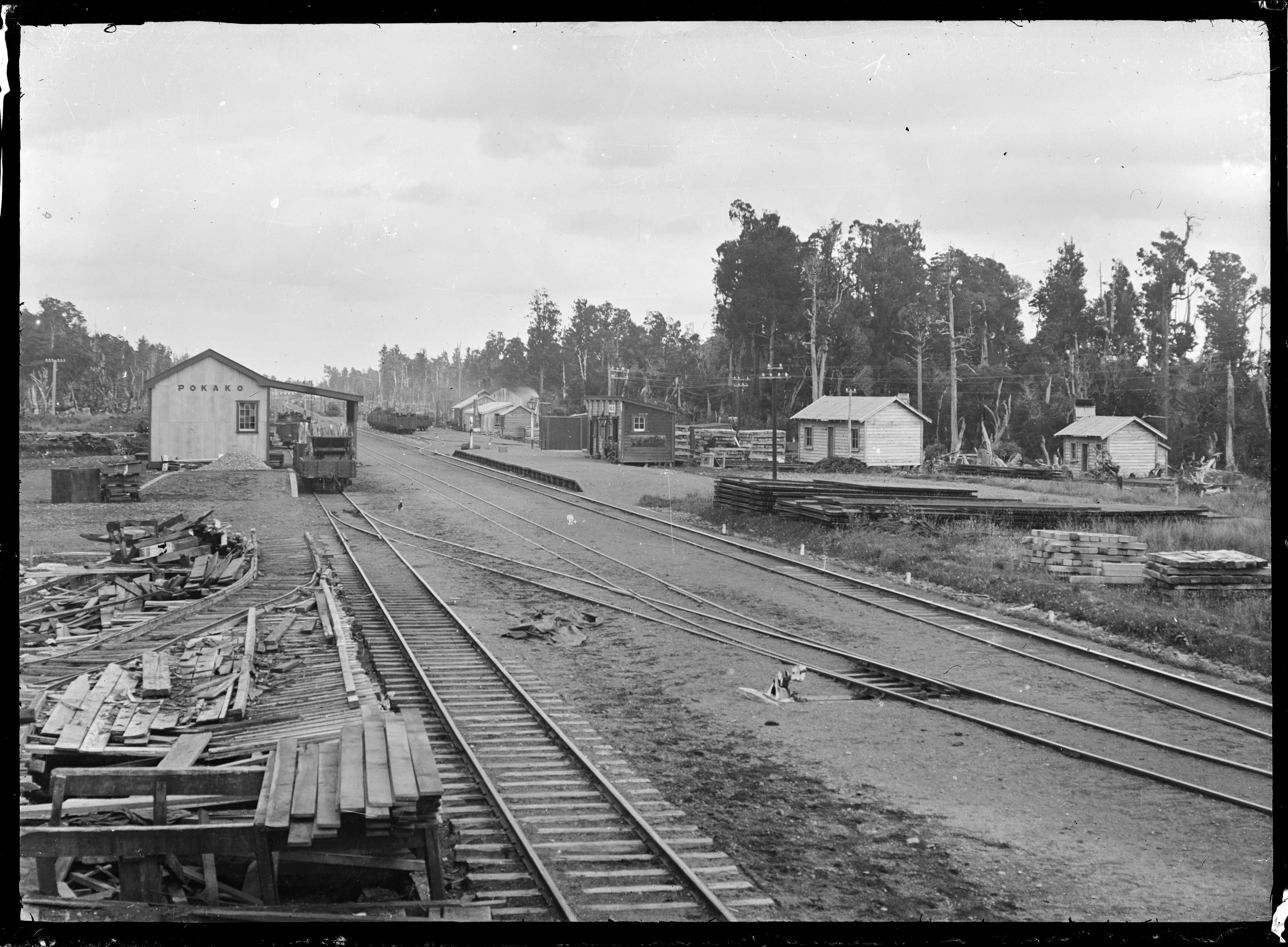
- Pokaka circa 1924, still with Pokako name

General information
- Location: New Zealand
- Coordinates: 39.292489°S 175.390314°E
- Elevation: 811 m (2,661 ft)
- Line: North Island Main Trunk
- Distance: Wellington 332.77 km (206.77 mi)

History
- Opened: in use from 20 March 1908
- Closed: 1 September 1971
- Electrified: June 1988
- Former names: to 29 July 1922 was Pokako

Services
Preceding station	Historical railways	Following station
Makatote; Line open, station open 4.1 km (2.5 mi)	North Island Main Trunk; KiwiRail	Horopito; Line open, station closed 5.52 km (3.43 mi)
Location

Pokaka was a station on the North Island Main Trunk line, in the Ruapehu District of New Zealand. It served the small village of Pokaka and lay to the south of Makatote Viaduct, the late completion of which held up opening of the station.

== Name ==
Pokako was changed to Pokaka in 1922, to "correct spelling", though both names seem to be used, at least from 1905 to 1945.

== History ==
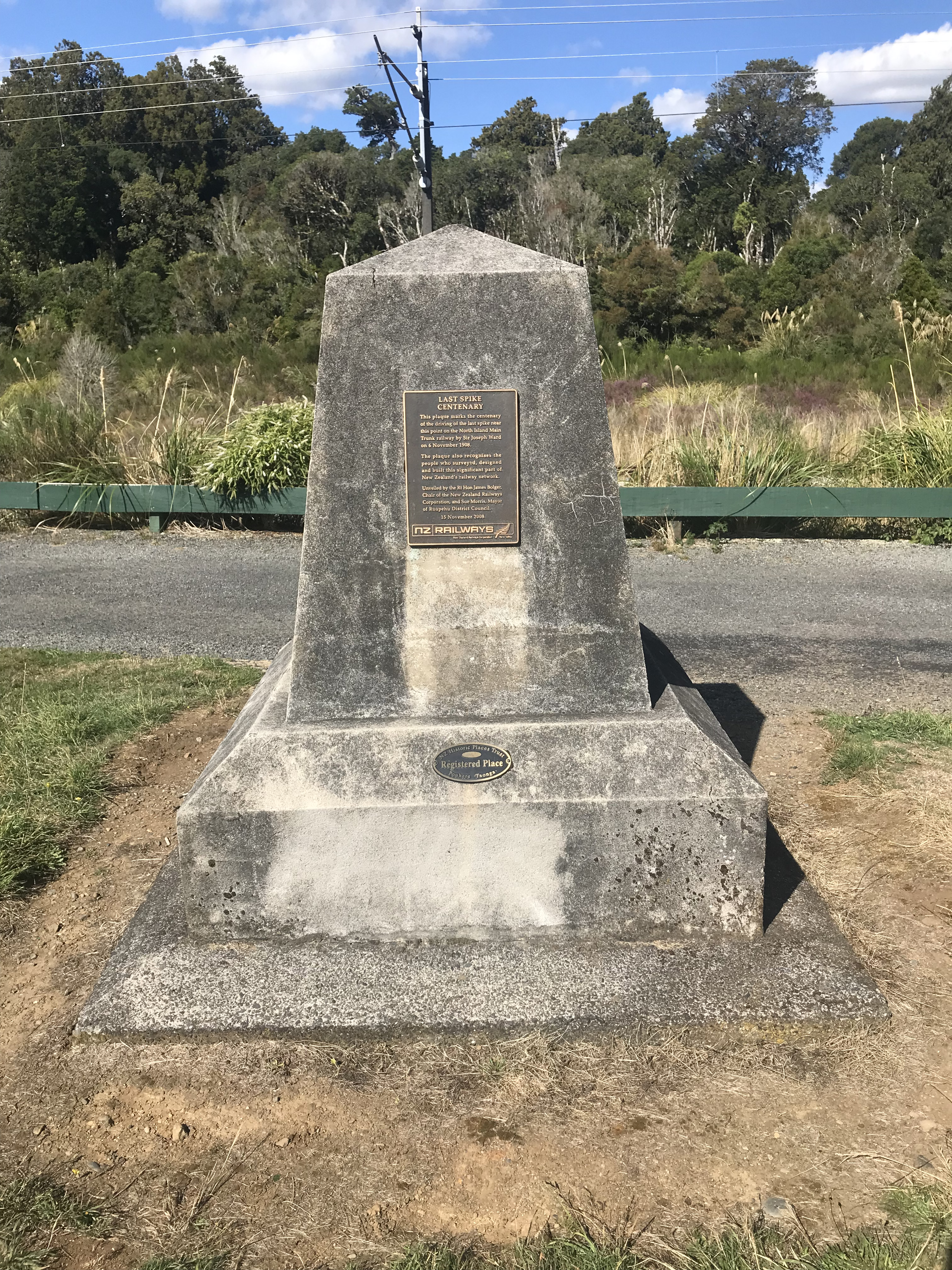
The Last Spike Memorial is located 1.5 km north from the station

Surveying for the route between Hīhītahi and Piriaka began in 1894. The North Island Main Trunk line was officially completed on 6 November 1908 when the prime minister, Sir Joseph Ward, conducted a last spike ceremony about 1.5 kilometres (0.93 mi) north of Pokaka; the Last Spike Monument erected by February 1909 commemorates this occasion. Work on the station building began in November 1908. A 6th class station was built by March 1909, with a 23 ft (7.0 m) by 11 ft (3.4 m) shelter shed, lobby, store and urinals on a 200 ft (61 m) by 15 ft (4.6 m) platform, a 20 ft (6.1 m) by 30 ft (9.1 m) goods shed, a loading bank, cattle and sheep yards and a cart approach. Pokaka was described as a tablet station from 1908 and a tablet porter was appointed in 1912. A loop could take 57 wagons, until closed on 13 September 1986, prior to electrification. There is now only a single line through the former station site.

The station closed to goods traffic in wagon lots on 21 August 1965 and to all traffic on 1 September 1971.

== Timber ==
Like the other stations along this part of NIMT, Pokaka had freight from several timber mills. Tiratu Sawmill Co applied for a private siding in 1920. Pokaka Timber Co still had a private siding in 1943, which ran to the west of the railway, probably from about 1935 to 1957. To the east, to supply timber to the Frankton Junction Railway House Factory, a state forestry tramway and sawmill opened in 1922, operated by NZR with F Class locos, based in a shed at the station. It closed in March 1927, or 1928. The tramway was sold to Pokaka Timber Co. in 1936, who used the Climax loco from Rangataua. The tramway was dismantled and sold in 1954, though the cab of the Climax loco remains near the station. In 1922 Manawatu-Oroua Electric Power Board and Manawatu CC took over cutting of manoao for poles, though larger trees were milled into sleepers. A tramway was laid in 1923. A tramway to the Mangaturuturu valley was still in use in 1938.

== Viaducts ==
Makatote and Manganui o te Ao viaducts are north of Pokaka and Mangaturuturu just south. They take the line over the Makatote, Manganui o te Ao and Mangaturuturu valleys, which descend steeply from Mount Ruapehu. All were designed by Peter Seton Hay and supervised by Resident Engineer, Frederick William Furkert. The concrete foundations and piers were built by the Public Works Department, but as PWD's Mangaonoho workshop was at full capacity on the more southerly viaducts, their steelwork was built by Christchurch firm, J. & A. Anderson & Co, who also built Waiteti and Makotuku viaducts.

Both viaducts were made up of a central concrete pier, supporting Warren truss steel girders and built using timber scaffolding. Like most NIMT viaducts, they were strengthened between 1925 and 1932, in preparation for the heavier K Class locos.

=== Manganui o te Ao Viaduct ===
Manganui o te Ao viaduct
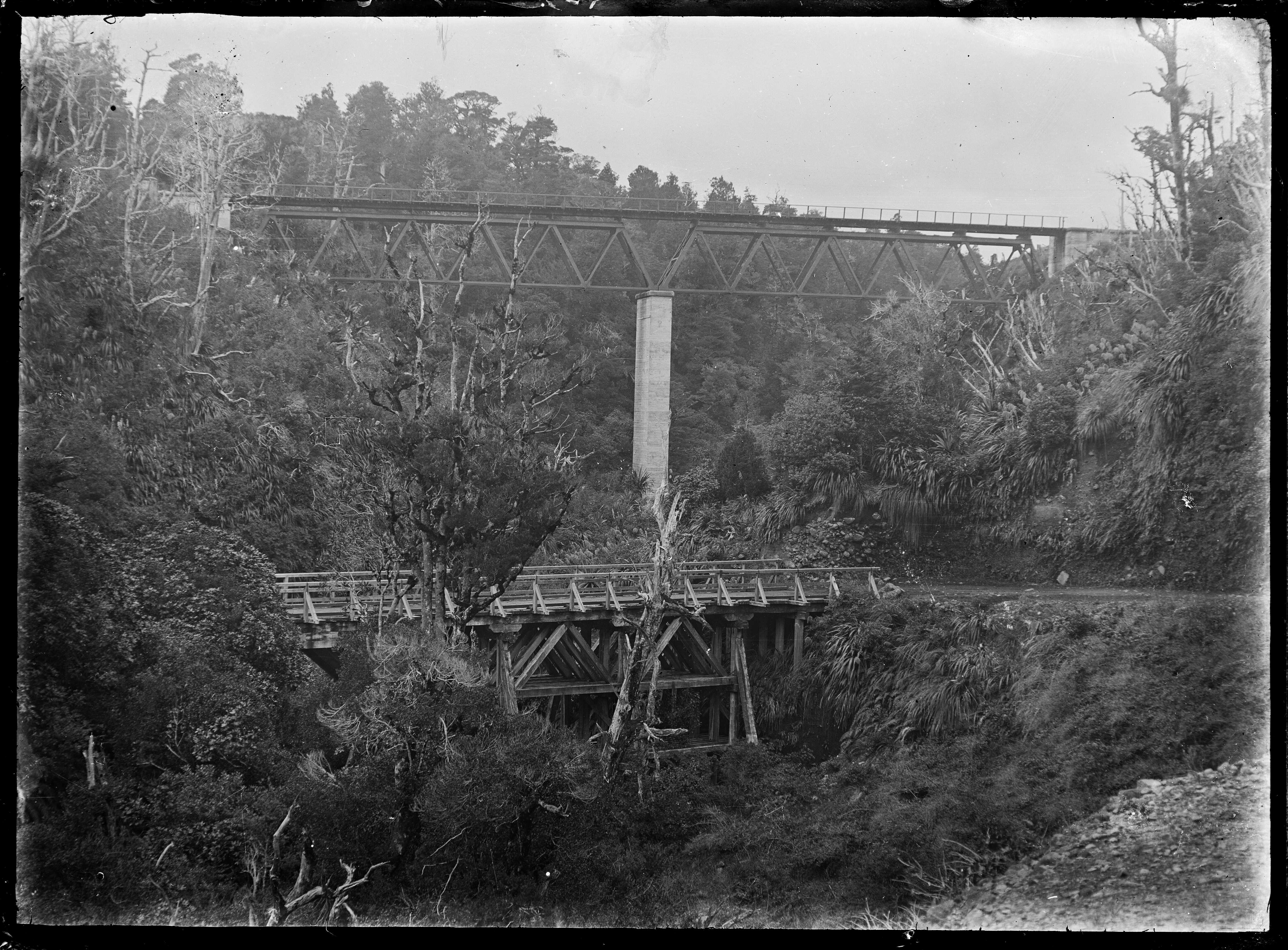
- Manganui o te Ao Viaduct and road bridge in 1921
- Coordinates: 39.27878°S 175.38931°E
- Carries: Single track of the North Island Main Trunk
- Crosses: Hapuawhenua Stream
- Owner: KiwiRail

Characteristics
- Total length: 290 feet (88 m)
- Height: 112 feet (34 m)

History
- Engineering design by: Andersons
- Construction start: 1906
- Construction end: April 1908
- Replaced by: 1967 reinforced concrete, 91 m (299 ft) long viaduct

Over a kilometre north of Pokaka, Manganui o te Ao Viaduct is a straight viaduct, 290 ft (88 m) long and up to 112 ft (34 m) above Manganui o te Ao River, supported by a single concrete pier. Each 1908 girder was 122 ft (37 m) long, with 230 tons of steel in the bridge, costing £8,840. The original viaduct was replaced in 1967, or 1964, by a slightly longer 91 m (299 ft) reinforced and pre-stressed concrete viaduct.

Mangaturuturu viaduct
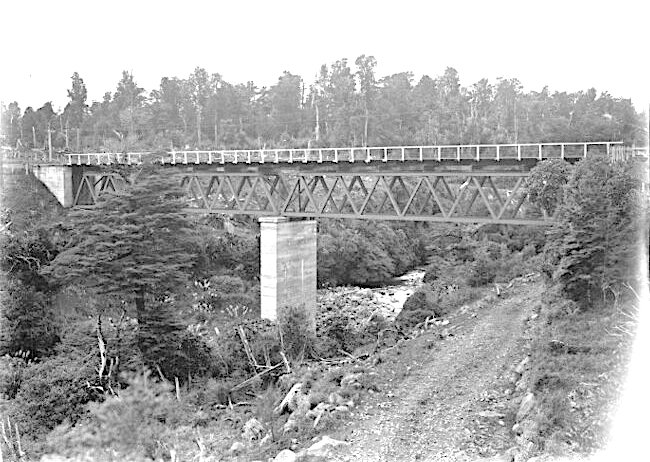
- Mangaturuturu viaduct in 1921
- Coordinates: 39.30467°S 175.38987°E
- Carries: Single track of the North Island Main Trunk
- Crosses: Mangaturuturu River
- Owner: KiwiRail

Characteristics
- Design: concrete pier, two 30 metres (98 ft) steel Warren trusses.
- Material: Steel
- Total length: 60 metres (200 ft)
- Height: 18 metres (59 ft)
- No. of spans: 2

History
- Engineering design by: Andersons
- Constructed by: PWD
- Construction start: 1907
- Construction end: June 1908

Heritage New Zealand – Category 2
- Designated: 20 February 2009
- Reference no.: 7779

Location
- Interactive map of Mangaturuturu viaduct

=== Mangaturuturu Viaduct ===
Just over a kilometre south of Pokaka, Mangaturuturu Viaduct is longer, but lower, being 61 m (200 ft) long and up to 60 ft (18 m) high. Each girder is 98 ft (30 m) long. It is one of the few viaducts surviving from the construction era and was therefore listed in 2009. Repairs and replacements included the rail beams in 1958, 1987, 2005 and 2008, bolts in 1962 and repainting in 1979 and 2005. In 1971 the central pier was underpinned and vertically pre-stressed. In 1975 it withstood a lahar, which raised the river to 2.1 m (6 ft 11 in) above its flood level.
