= Waiteti Viaduct =

Waiteti viaduct
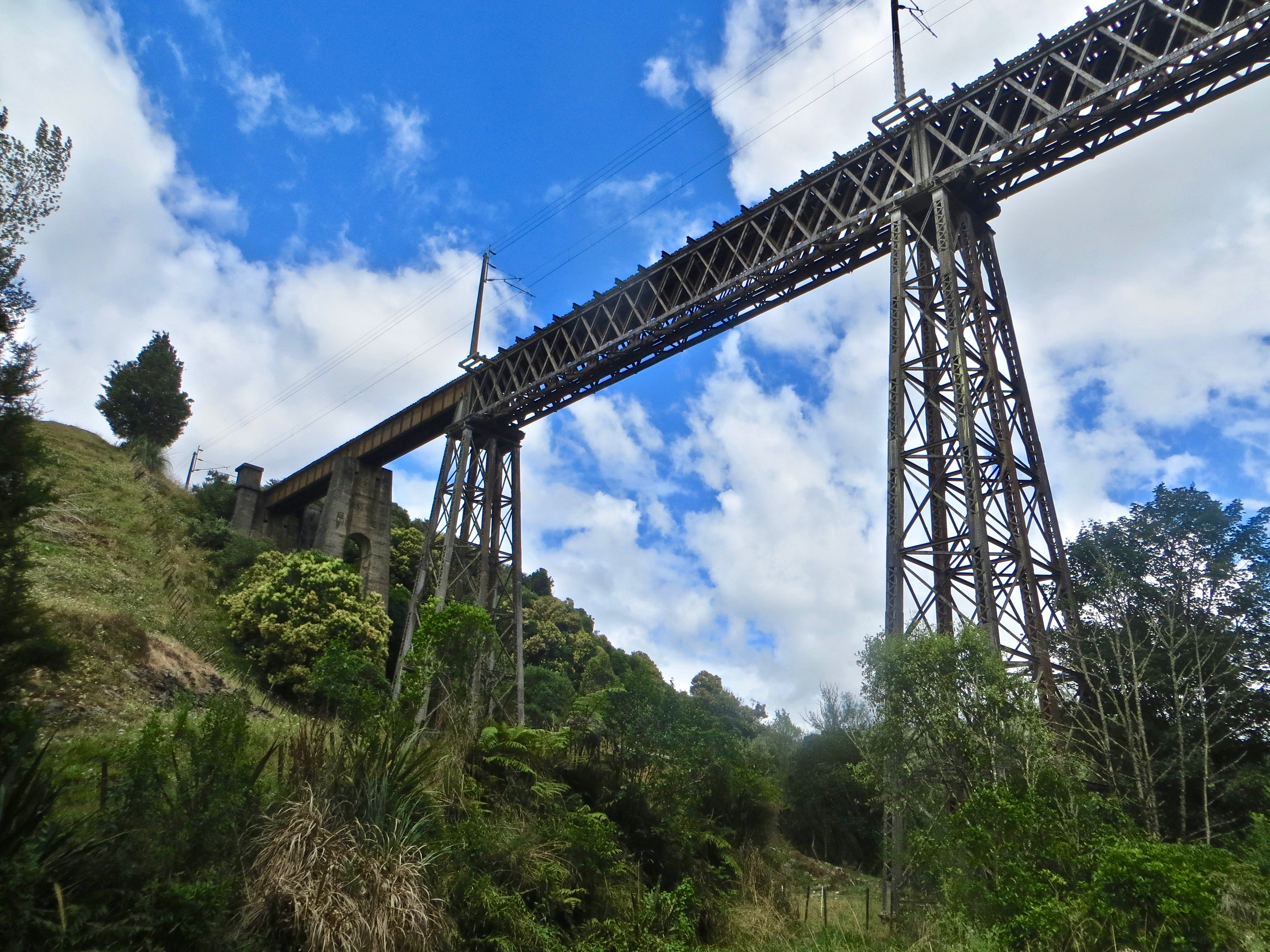
- Waiteti Viaduct in 2015
- Coordinates: 38.360509°S 175.188137°E
- Carries: Single track of the North Island Main Trunk
- Crosses: Waiteti Stream
- Owner: KiwiRail

Characteristics
- Design: Plate girder and Pratt truss
- Material: Wrought iron
- Total length: 128.6 metres (422 ft)
- Height: 35 metres (115 ft)
- No. of spans: 4

History
- Engineering design by: Public Works Department
- Constructed by: J. & A. Anderson & Co
- Construction start: 1888
- Construction end: 10 July 1889

Heritage New Zealand – Category 1
- Designated: 15 February 1990
- Reference no.: 4175

Location
- Interactive map of Waiteti viaduct

The Waiteti Viaduct (Bridge 179), 3 km (1.9 mi) south of Te Kuiti and 2.5 km (1.6 mi) north of the station site, was opened in 1889. It is the most northerly of the major viaducts on the NIMT. At its highest, the railway is 35 m (115 ft) above the road to Mangaokewa Scenic Reserve and the Waiteti Stream, a tributary of the Mangaokewa Stream, which flows into the Waipā.

Te Araroa walk track runs through the Mangaokewa valley, near the viaduct. The nearby 200 ha (490 acres) Mangaokewa Scenic Reserve is mainly podocarp/tawa forest with nīkau groves.

The 154 acres (62 ha) for the Waiteti section of the railway was acquired under the Public Works Act in 1888, apparently without payment.

== Design and construction ==
Designed by the Public Works Department, Waiteti Viaduct was built by Christchurch firm, J. & A. Anderson & Co, from 1887 to 1889. As the NIMT was extended south, the same firm later built the Makatote, Mangaturuturu, and Manganui-o-te-ao viaducts.

Waiteti Viaduct was completed in 1888, tested for loading in March and opened in May 1889. It used four lattice girders of 32.4 m (106 ft), totalling 130 metres (425 feet), supported on three lattice piers held in mass concrete abutments and foundations. The wrought iron parts were made in a foundry set up by Anderson in Te Kuiti, then riveted on site. The track and footway were on a rolled iron transom.

It was given Category 1 listing by the New Zealand Historic Places Trust in 1990.

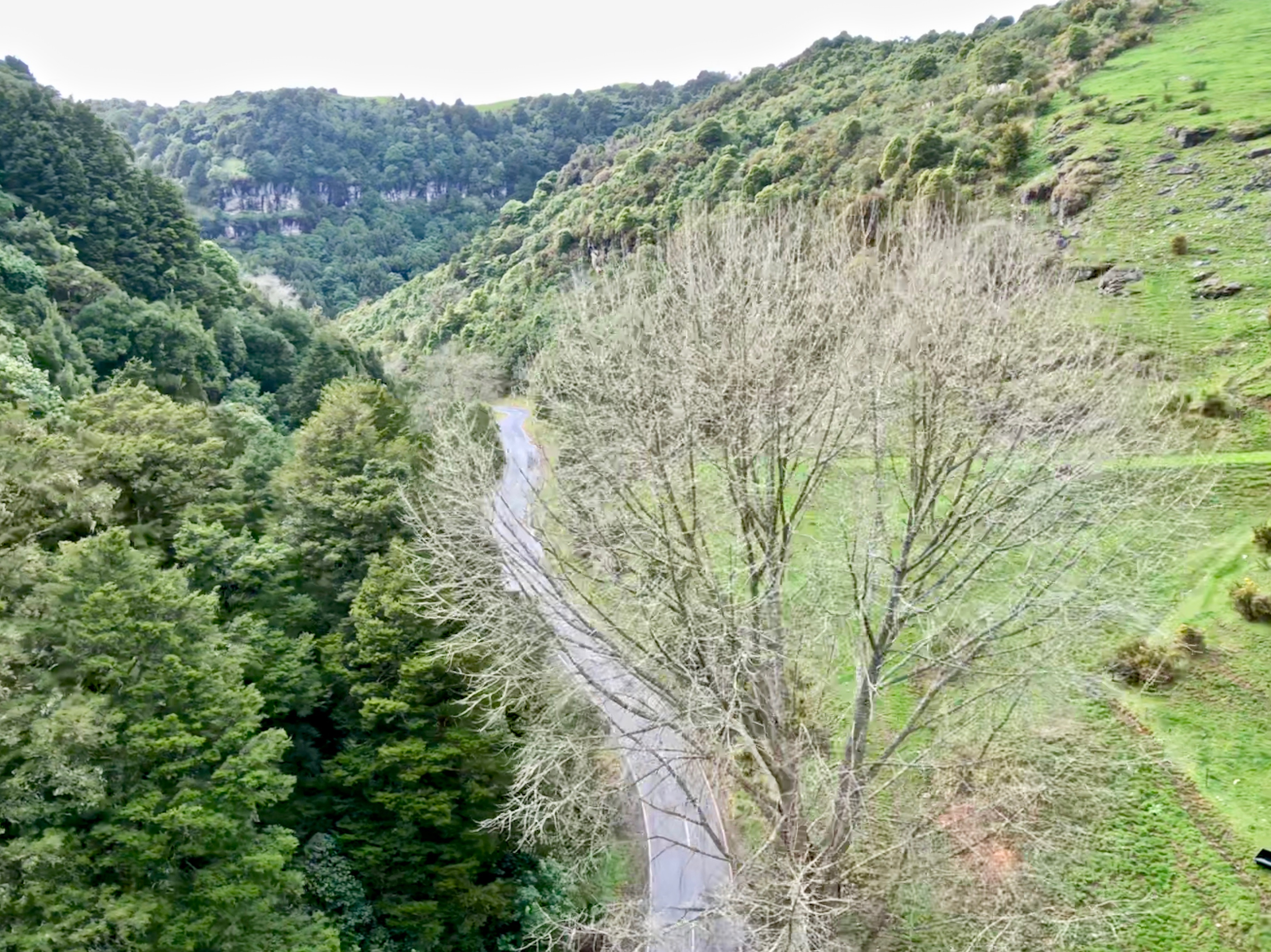
Waiteti Stream and Mangaokewa Gorge and Scenic Reserve from Waiteti Viaduct in 2018

== Maintenance and upgrades ==
By 1913 trains and locomotives had increased in weight and the viaducts restricted use of Class X locos. So a strengthening scheme proposed to halve each span by adding supports. A concrete pier was to be added at each end, with steel rocking piers supporting the central spans. The concrete piers had reached about 60 ft (18 m) , when war put an end to the work, which did not resume until 1926. The concrete piers were then completed, but rather than the rocking piers, the central spans were strengthened with iron from either end and the end spans replaced with 53 ft (16 m) plate girders. They arrived in parts at Te Kuiti, where an Ingersoll-Rand air plant machine was used to rivet the 19.5 ton girders. A detailed account of the work was given in the Railways Magazine in 1927.

Further strengthening and maintenance was done between 1950 and 1959, 1970 and 1979 in 1983, when the viaduct was painted with red lead primer and in 2017–2018, which included walkway repairs, strengthening of kingposts, replacement of corbels and water blasting.

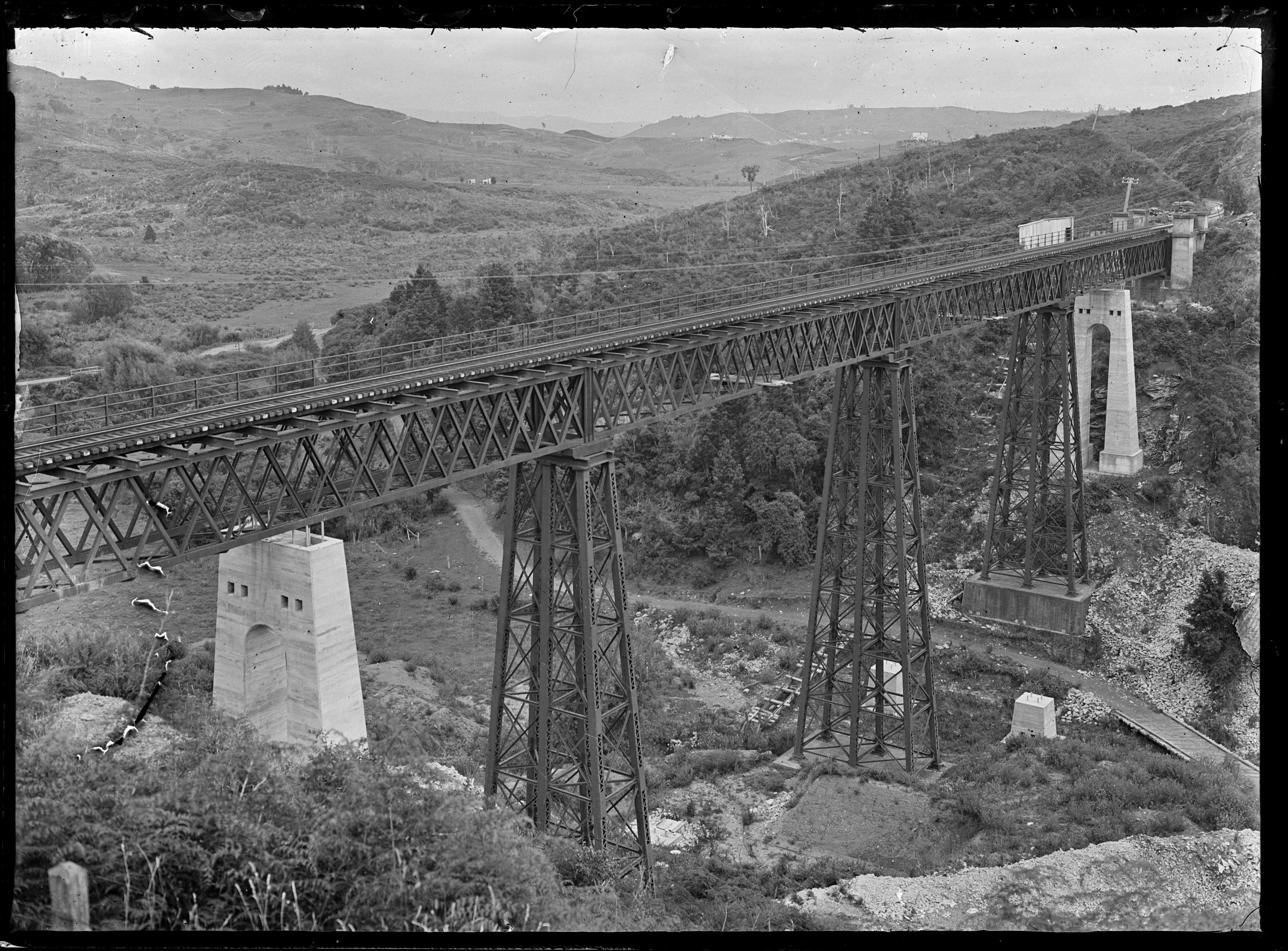
Waiteti Viaduct, Te Kuiti, in 1917. ATLIB 284366
