= Pōkākā =

Pōkākā is a Māori word meaning "storm", and may refer to:

- Pokaka or Elaeocarpus hookerianus, a native forest tree of New Zealand
- Pokaka, New Zealand, a small township in New Zealand
