= Lake Ruataniwha =

Lake in the South Island of New Zealand

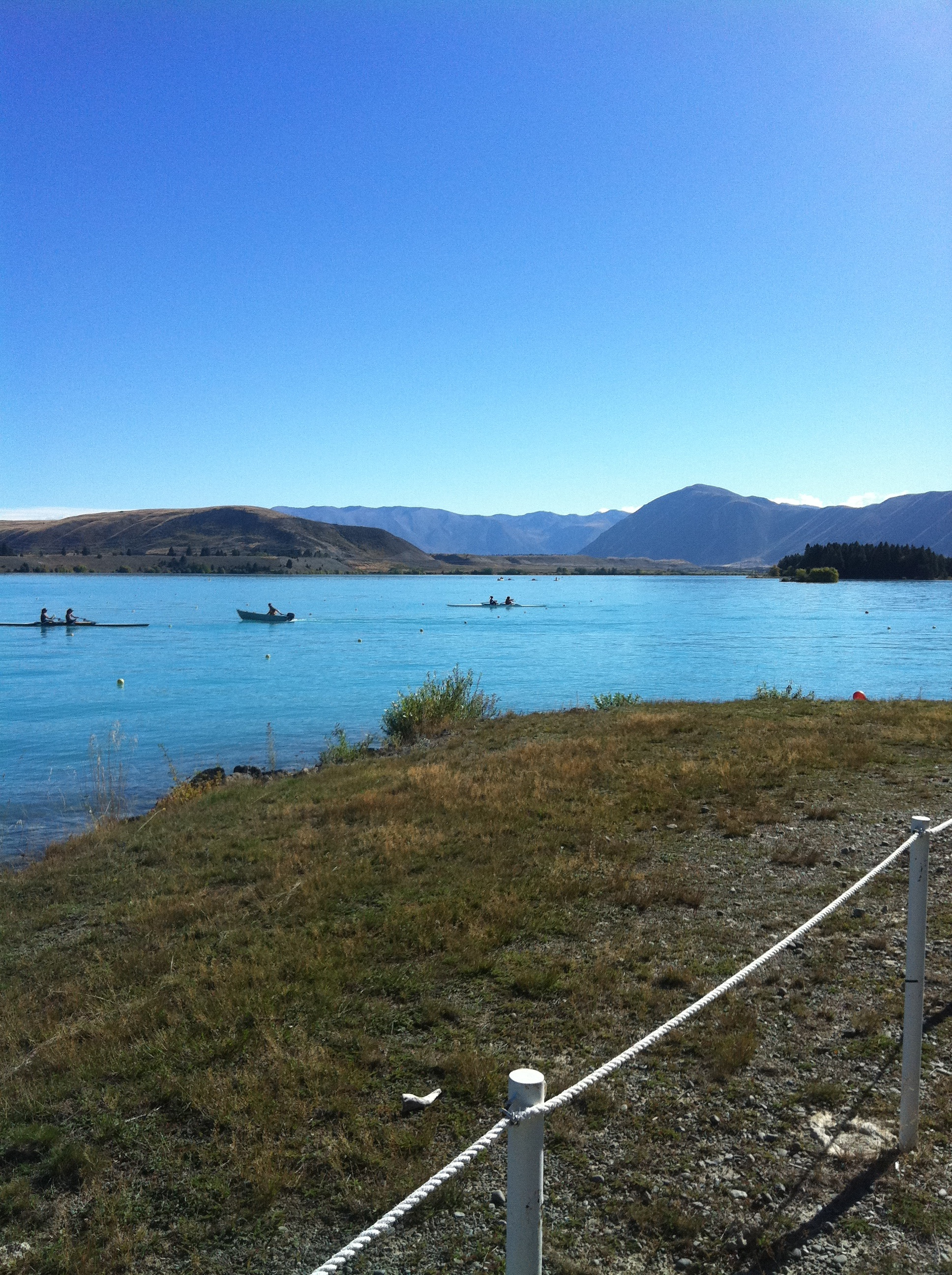
- Rowing on Lake Ruataniwha

- Location within South Island
- Location: South Island
- Coordinates: 44.281°S 170.071°E
- Type: Artificial lake
- Primary inflows: Ōhau River
- Basin countries: New Zealand
- Surface area: 3.4 km^{2} (1.3 sq mi)
- Surface elevation: 458 m (1,503 ft)

Lake Ruataniwha is an artificial lake in the Mackenzie Basin in the South Island of New Zealand. It was formed in 1977–1981 as part of the Waitaki hydroelectric project. It lies on the traditional boundary of the Canterbury and Otago provinces, with the town of Twizel two kilometres to the north.

The lake takes its name from the Ruataniwha Station, a large sheep-station in the area, part of which the NZ Electricity Department purchased as the site for the township of Twizel (founded in 1968). Ruataniwha was a Māori chief who drowned when the canoe Arai-te-uru sank near Moeraki in the 12th century CE.

== Features ==
The lake is approximately 4.5 km in length and covers 3.4 square km.

It was formed by the New Zealand Ministry of Works as part of the Upper Waitaki Power Project between 1977 and 1981 in a gorge created by the Ōhau River. The gorge was blocked by the building of the Ruataniwha Dam whose crest carries State Highway 8 between Twizel and Omarama.

Lake Ruataniwha is fed by the output from the Ōhau A power station and also by an overflow discharge from Lake Ōhau down the normally dry bed of the Ōhau River.

Ruataniwha discharges through a natural gap in the dam into a canal which feeds the Ōhau B power station. Immediately downstream is a connection to Wairepo Arm, a small lake. Connected to the Wairepo Arm by way of a culvert under State Highway 8 is Kellands Pond, whose 22 hectare area occupies further gravel pits. There is a spillway (Gate 22) built into the dam which contains 3 gates with a total discharge capacity of 4,900 cubic metres per second which flows into the normally dry bed of the Ōhau River.

The lake functions as a surge reservoir for the power scheme. If, during excessive inflows into Lake Ōhau which Ōhau A is unable to pass or, when there has been a failure of the Ōhau canal, Lake Ōhau can overflow a weir into the normally dry bed of the upper reaches of the Ōhau River and thus into Lake Ruataniwha. Also, if water cannot pass down the canal to Ōhau B then the excess inflows into the lake can be diverted by the spillway down the bed of the lower reaches of the Ōhau River to Lake Benmore. While limited the storage capacity of the lake also ensures that the flows through Ōhau A do not have to be exactly matched to those through Ōhau B and Ōhau C.

== Construction ==
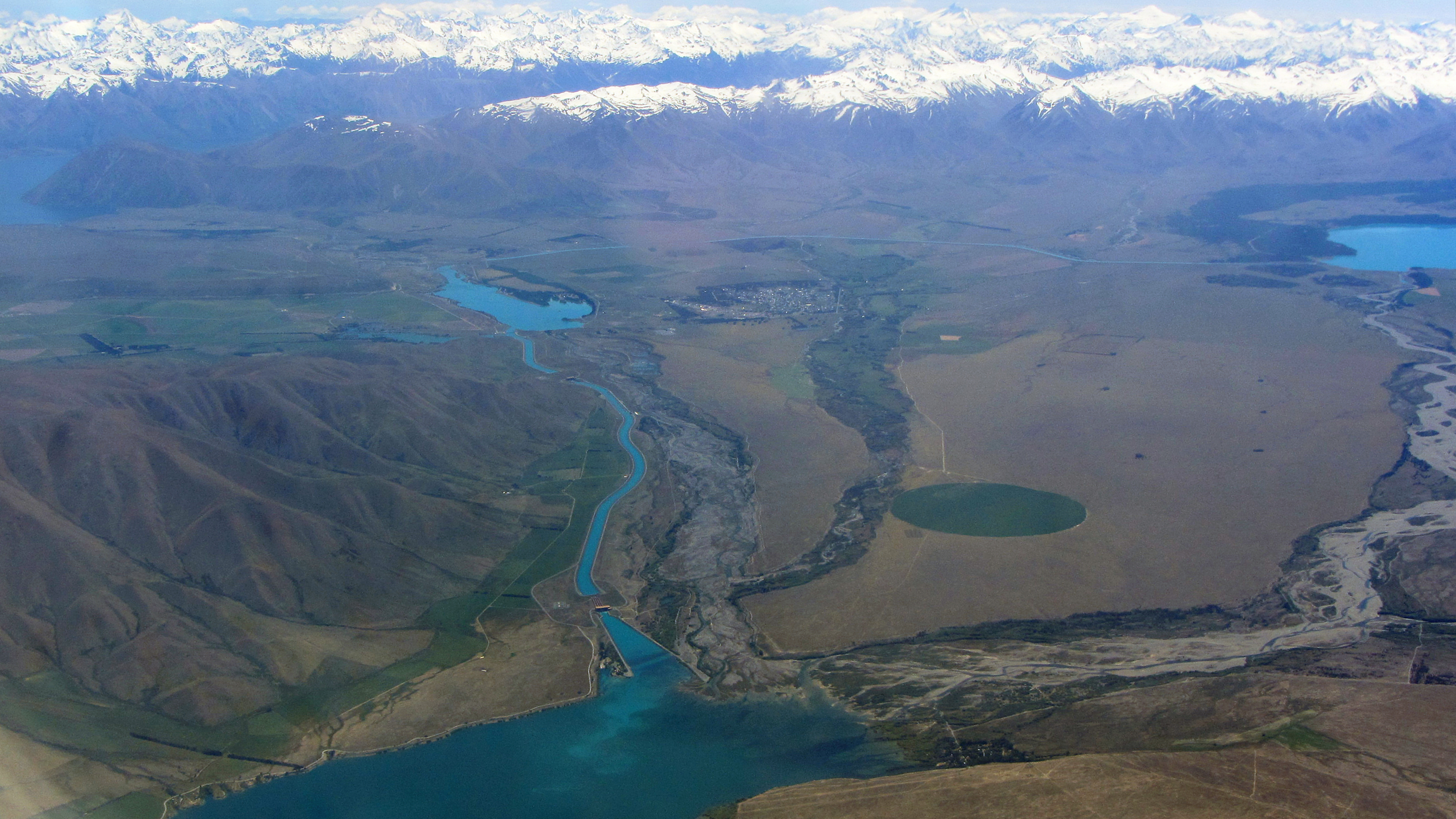
View of the canal that flows via Ōhau B station from Lake Ruataniwha (centre distance) to Lake Benmore (foreground)

Before construction of the dam could start the Ōhau River was diverted by cutting a channel through a low, rocky extension of the Benmore Range and building three diversion gates there which consumed 200,000 cubic metres of concrete. The Ōhau River was diverted in August 1980 so that water passed through Ōhau A and then back down the river bed. Later that year, downstream of Ōhau A, the river was again diverted, this time away from its natural channel and through the completed gates. An earth dam with gravel shoulders was then built on its upstream and downstream sides. The main dam, which blocks the original river channel, is 240 metres long while an adjoining wing dam is 480 metres. When the dam was completed the diversion gates were closed which, beginning in March 1982, impounded the water behind the dam up to and over a temporary weir which had been built downstream of Ōhau A. In 1984 the lake was temporarily lowered by 3 metres while this weir was removed to improve the performance of the Ōhau A power station. The diversion gates now function as spillway gates to allow excess water to pass safely through the dam. The lake was officially opened on Saturday 24 April 1982. There was a weekend event which attracted 7000 spectators with the rowing course hosting a regatta attended by 188 crews and representing 80 South Island rowing clubs.

== Recreation ==
The lake was developed by the Ministry of Works into a major recreational resource for the area with a large number of trees and a holiday park on the lakeside. Ruataniwha is also one of New Zealand's main rowing venues.

This was not planned as part of the hydroelectric project but instead came about as facilities were constructed as a public service on the instructions of Max Smith, the locally based Project Engineer of the Upper Waitaki Power Project. The rowing course was surveyed, landscaping undertaken and anchors put down for lane markers before the lake was filled. He reached agreement with the Rowing Association that it would fund the building of the regatta control building at an estimated cost of NZ$75,000. When pressure to complete the building before the official opening of the lake raised the cost to approximately NZ$130,000 he used project funds to temporarily bridge the gap until the Rowing Association made full payment.

Senior officials in the headquarters of the Ministry of Works alleged this was a misuse of funds. Despite overwhelming support from the local community, he took early retirement rather than face charges under the State Services Act. At the time Smith was voicing disagreement with the government's proposals to reduce the Ministry of Works' experienced construction workforce and to disestablish Twizel; all of which may have influenced the official displeasure. The principal access road to the lake was named Max Smith Drive by the local community in his honour while the South Island Rowing Association made him its first life member.

In later years, Meridian Energy credited Smith with the idea for the Lake Ruataniwha rowing course, and the rowing community further commemorated his contribution through Max Smith Park and the Max Smith Ruataniwha Trophy.

The lake's facilities can accommodate 600 rowing boats and 2000 competitors. The rowing course has ten lanes. The regatta control building contains a first aid room, drug testing area, administration rooms, storage rooms and on the upper floor, facilities for judges and the timekeepers, as well as a commentary room. The lake typically hosts an average of 5 major rowing events a year. The New Zealand national rowing championships are held there every second year, alternating with the national secondary school rowing championships. (During these the Maadi Cup is contested.) The lake is also used for swimming, yachting, canoeing and windsurfing.

== In popular culture ==
Lake Ruataniwha was a filming location for the 2009 zombie film Last of the Living.

== See also ==
- Lake Karapiro
- Maadi Cup
