= Last Spike Memorial =

Memorial in Manganui, New Zealand

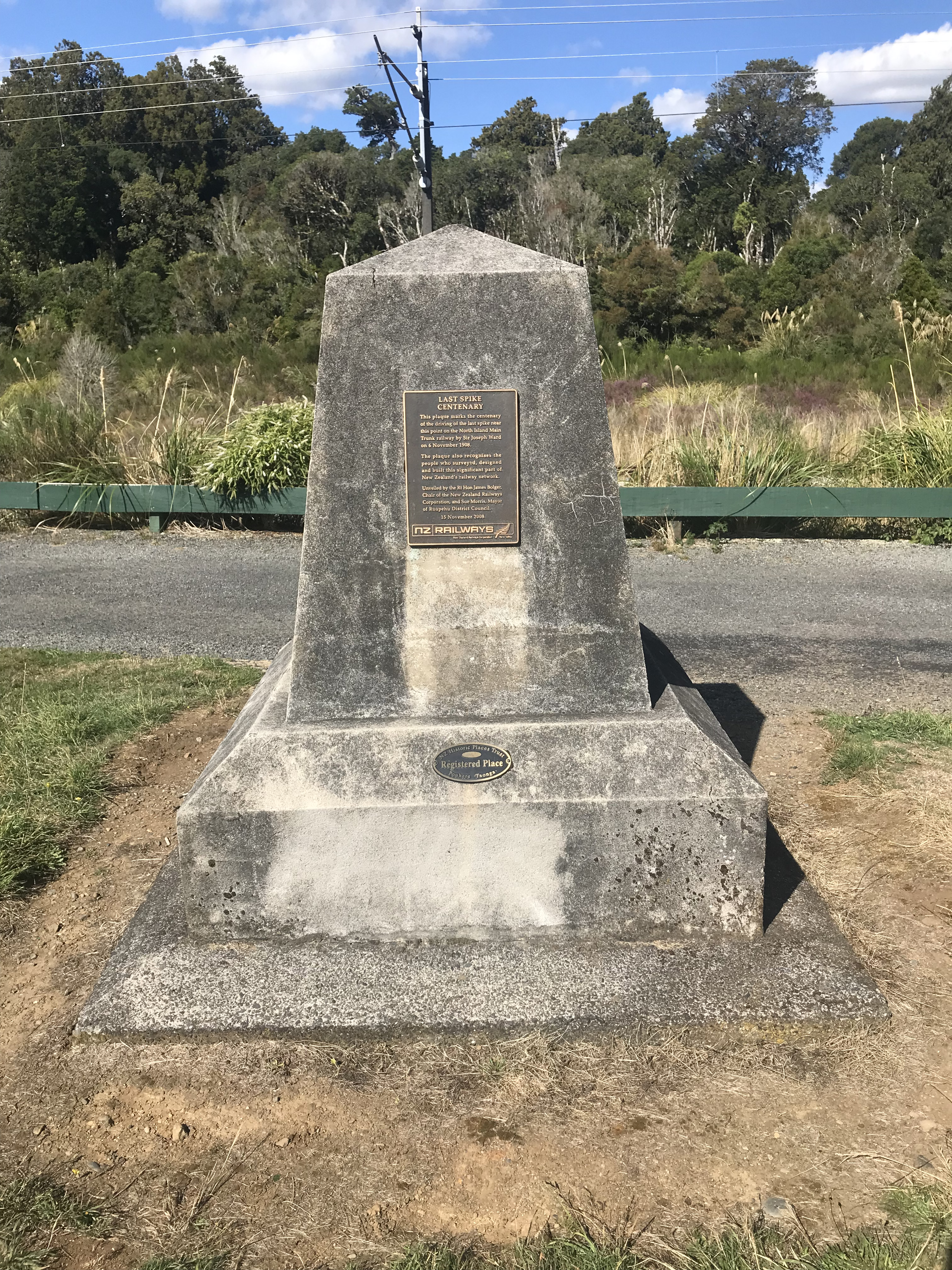
- The memorial in 2022
- Interactive map of Last Spike Memorial
- Location: near Pokaka, Ruapehu District, Manawatū-Whanganui region
- Coordinates: 39.27639°S 175.38920°E
- Type: obelisk
- Material: concrete
- Height: 6 feet (1.8 m)
- Completion date: February 1909
- Dedicated to: Last spike ceremony performed by Sir Joseph Ward

The Last Spike Memorial is a monument in the Ruapehu District of New Zealand. It marks the location where the "last spike" was driven in 1908 for the completion of the North Island Main Trunk line.

== Location ==
The monument is located about 1.5 kilometres (0.93 mi) north of the locality named Pokaka, immediately north of the Manganuioteao Viaduct, and a short distance south of the Makatote Viaduct.

== Description ==
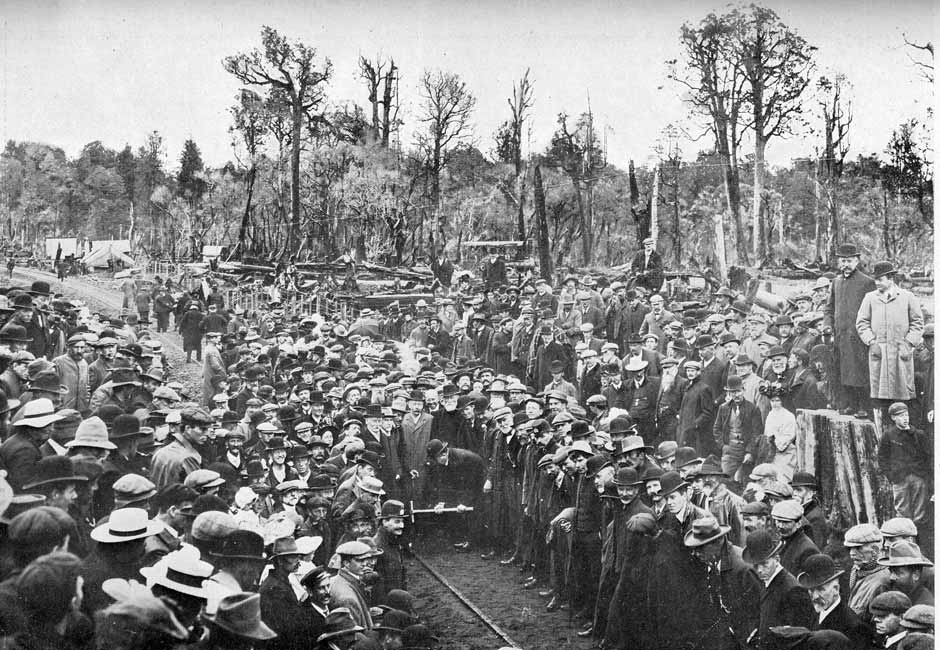
Joseph Ward driving last spike

A concrete obelisk was erected in early 1909. The monument marks the location where the Prime Minister, Sir Joseph Ward, conducted a last spike ceremony on 6 November 1908. A silver-plated spike was used, though the actual last spike was driven in about 300 m (980 ft) to the south, to complete work on the Manganuioteao Viaduct (then called Manganui-o-te-Ao), where temporary tracks met on 3 August 1908. The monument is four-sided, 6 ft (1.8 m) high and 4 ft (1.2 m) across the base, with black lettering on a white marble slab. It was about 20 ft (6.1 m) to the west of the line, but moved a further 10 ft (3.0 m) west in 1973. It is marked by road signs on State Highway 4 and a small carpark.

== Recognition ==
Designations

Heritage New Zealand – Category 2
- Designated: 10 December 2004
- Reference no.: 7575

As part of its "Engineering to 1990" project, the Institution of Professional Engineers New Zealand (IPENZ; now Engineering New Zealand Te Ao Rangahau) added the central section of the North Island Main Trunk line to its engineering heritage register. In 1997, IPENZ put two new brass inscription plates on the monument. On 10 December 2004, the monument was registered by the New Zealand Historic Places Trust (now Heritage New Zealand) as a Category II structure, with the registration number 7575.

== See also ==
- Golden spike (United States)
- Last spike (Canadian Pacific Railway)
