= Downer EDI Works Limited =

New Zealand engineering company

Downer EDI Works Limited (previously Public Works department, Ministry of Works and Works Infrastructure Limited and often simply Works) is a New Zealand-based engineering and construction company owned by the Downer Group.

== History ==
The former New Zealand Ministry of Works, originally set up in 1870 as the Public Works Department and later known as Works Civil Construction, was corporatized in 1996. As a result, a new entity was created and the assets and operations of the former organization were transferred to it. It procured over 30 other companies in the following years, and changed its name to Works Infrastructure in 2000. In July 2007, it became Downer EDI Works Limited.

== Structure ==
Downer EDI Works is spread across various countries—New Zealand (around 2,700 employees), Australia, Asia and the Pacific region. Its annual turnover exceeds NZ$600 million, with a 2006 financial year surplus of NZ$16 million.

Over 75% of the business of the company falls under the various branches of New Zealand Government (including local authorities), which involves construction and maintenance of the country's roads. 300,000 tonnes of asphalt is produced by Works per year.

== Awards ==
The Accident Compensation Corporation awarded Works Infrastructure Limited the ACC 'ThinkSafe' Workplace Safety Award in 2005 for its workplace safety culture.
