= Ōhau (skifield) =

Ski field in the Canterbury Region of New Zealand

Coordinates: 44.224634°S 169.778670°E

Ōhau Snow Field
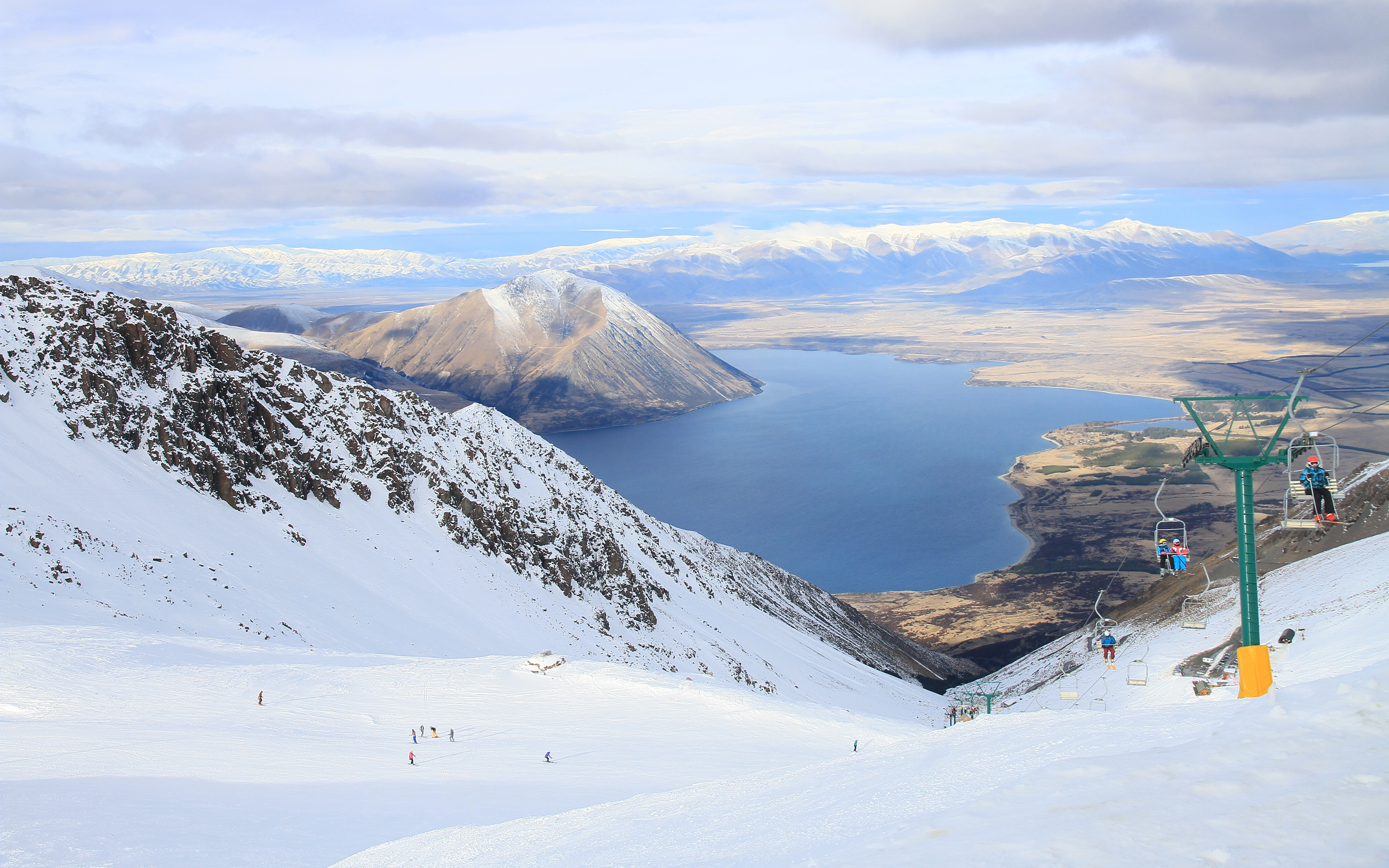
- Interactive map of Ōhau Snow Field
- Location: South Island, New Zealand
- Nearest city: Wānaka, New Zealand
- Vertical: 400 m (1,300 ft)
- Top elevation: 1,925 m (6,316 ft)
- Base elevation: 1,425 m (4,675 ft)
- Skiable area: 125 ha (310 acres)
- Trails: 16
- Lift system: 3 total; 1 chairlift, 1 snow mat, 1 platter
- Lift capacity: 2295/hour
- Terrain parks: 2
- Snowmaking: Yes
- Night skiing: No
- Website: www.ohau.co.nz

Ōhau is a small commercial skifield in the foothills of New Zealand's Southern Alps, near the boundary between the Otago and Canterbury regions, and close to the western shore of the lake of the same name. The skifield was originally developed by the Mount Cook and Southern Lakes Tourist Co. The field's service town, Lake Ohau Alpine Village, is located on the shore of the lake to the south of the skifield.

== Details ==
In 2004, a new two seater chairlift was installed on the slopes. This chairlift opened up the snowfield a lot more and increased the lift-accessible terrain. The next year, the longest snowmat in New Zealand was installed in place of the ropetow. The skifield now has 3 lifts (1 chairlift, 1 platter lift and 1 snowmat).

The base altitude is 1400 m and the highest altitude is 1825 m. The access road is an unsealed alpine road but is usually kept in good condition with buses leaving from the lodge daily.

Historically, the season has run from mid-July to early October. In 2008, a new 23-cannon, fully automated snowmaking system was installed, allowing the skifield to open earlier, capturing lucrative July school holiday business.

== Expansion plans ==
In March 2012 it was announced that an ex-Treble Cone 2 seater chair lift had been purchased. This was to be installed over the following summer in time for the 2013 season, giving visitors a secondary access to the peak. This installation did not occur, and in June 2013 it was announced this chair lift had been traded for the ex-Cardrona "La Franchie" 2 seater chair lift to be installed depending on the success of the 2013 winter season. This new chair lift has a claimed increased capacity of 1200 skiers and boarders per hour on a 4.5 minute trip. In March 2014 it was noted, "unfortunately we cannot afford to put in the chairlift for 2014 but hopefully if the business continues to trend upwards we can put it in for 2015!".

== Scenery ==
Ōhau has some of the most spectacular mountain views in New Zealand. From the summit of the skifield a view of the Southern Alps can be seen. From the skifield runs, Lake Ōhau and the Mackenzie Basin can be seen spread out below in the valley floor. There are good views across the lake to Ben Ohau.

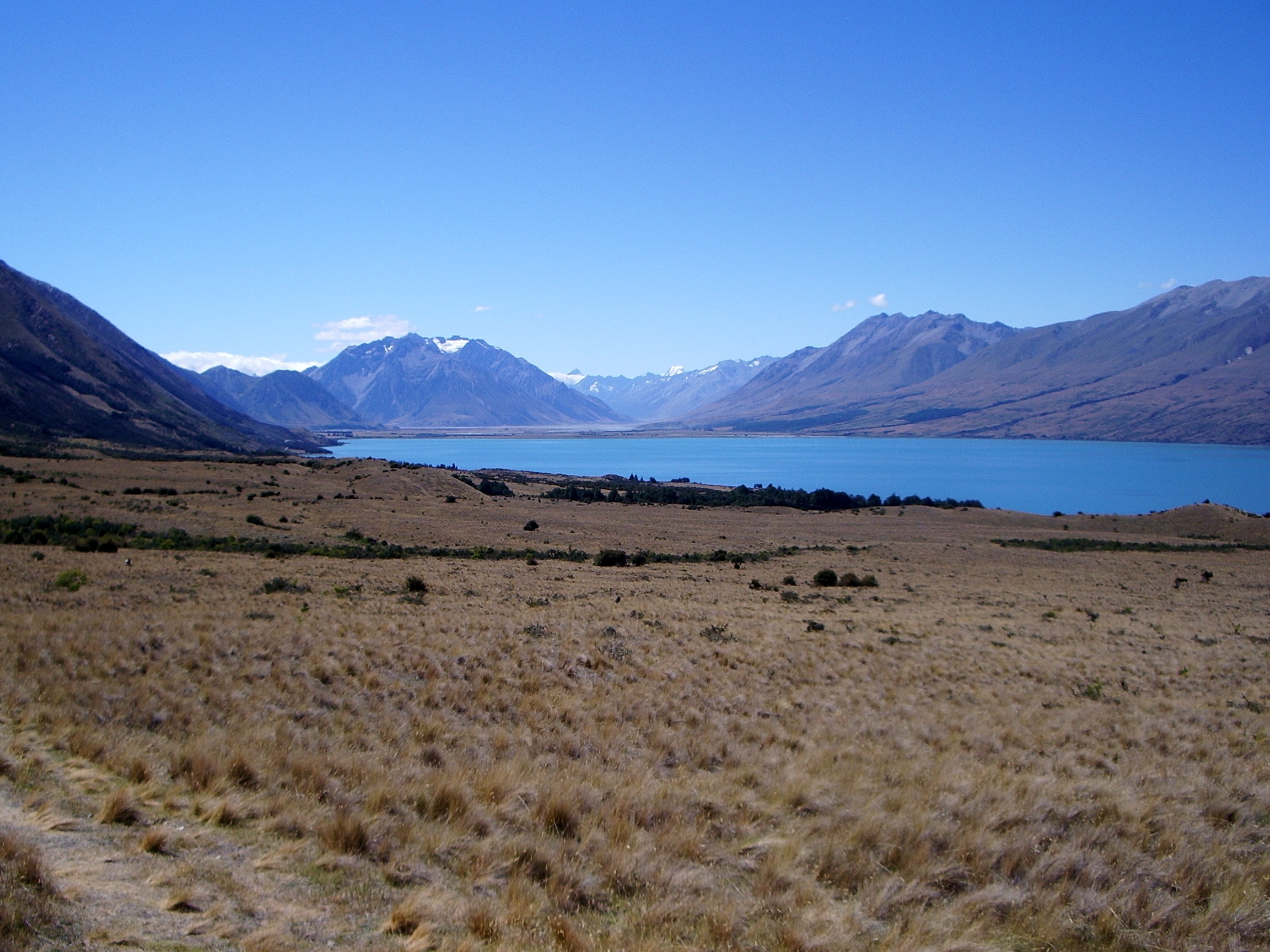
View of Lake Ōhau
