= Opus Group =

Opus Group Berhad is the corporate holding company of several companies operating under Opus brand name in several countries:

- Opus International (M) Berhad
- Opus International Consultants Limited New Zealand
- Opus International Consultants (Australia) Pty Ltd
- Opus International Consultants (Canada) Ltd
- Opus International Consultants (UK) Ltd

== Corporate information ==
Opus Group Berhad (Opus) through its subsidiaries is primarily involved in asset development and asset management of infrastructure and built environment assets. As the adviser, manager and partner, Opus develop and maintain assets across the transportation, infrastructure and built environment sectors; amongst such key facilities include intra and inter-urban highways, rail and transit system, maritime and airport, strategic viaduct and bridge linkages, and health care facilities.

Opus has over 80 offices in Australia, Canada, India, New Zealand, Malaysia and United Kingdom.

Opus Group Berhad is a subsidiary of UEM Group Berhad.
