= Pokaka, New Zealand =

Coordinates: 39°17.28′S 175°23.28′E

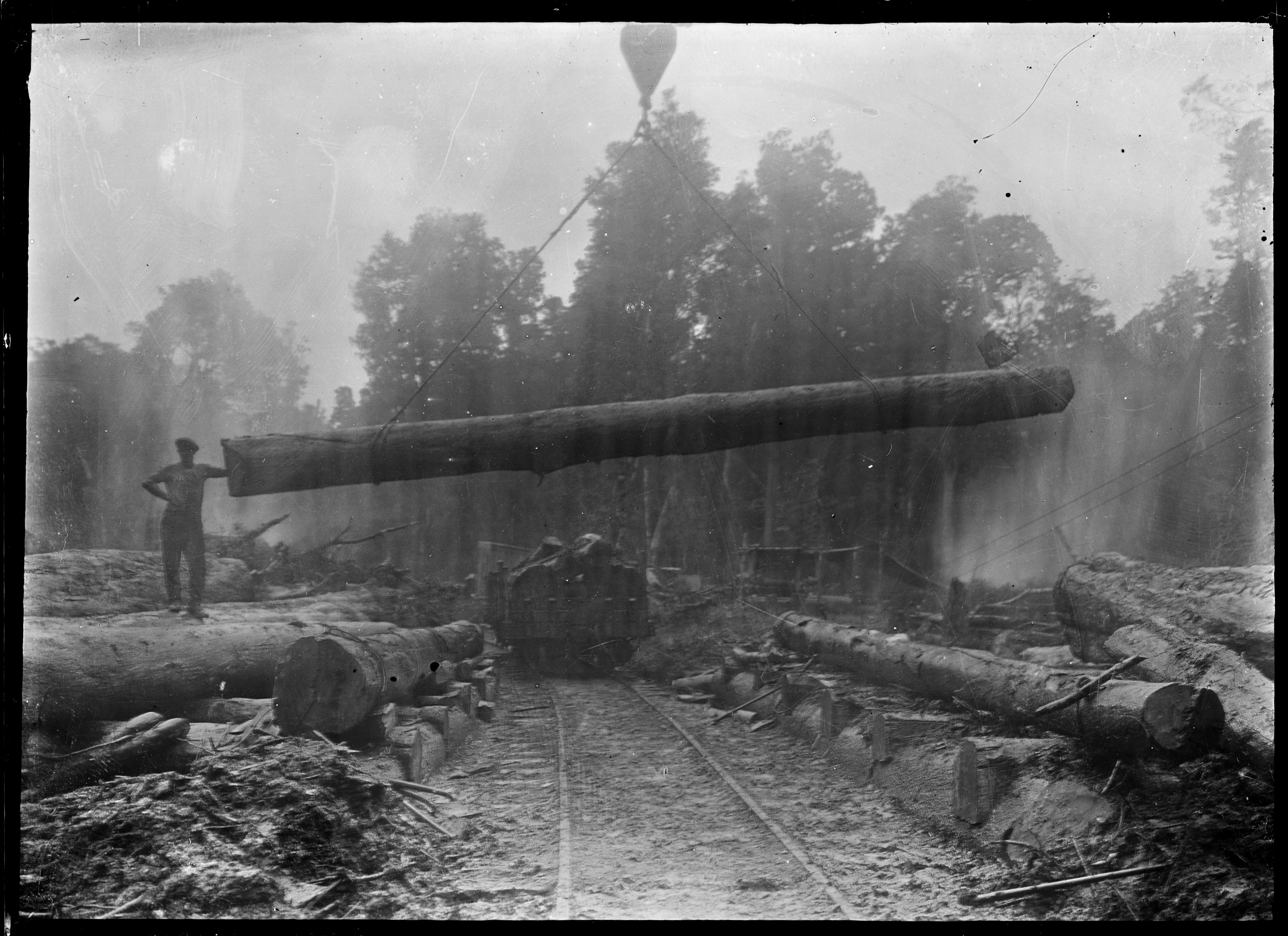
Loading logs at Pokaka, c. 1924

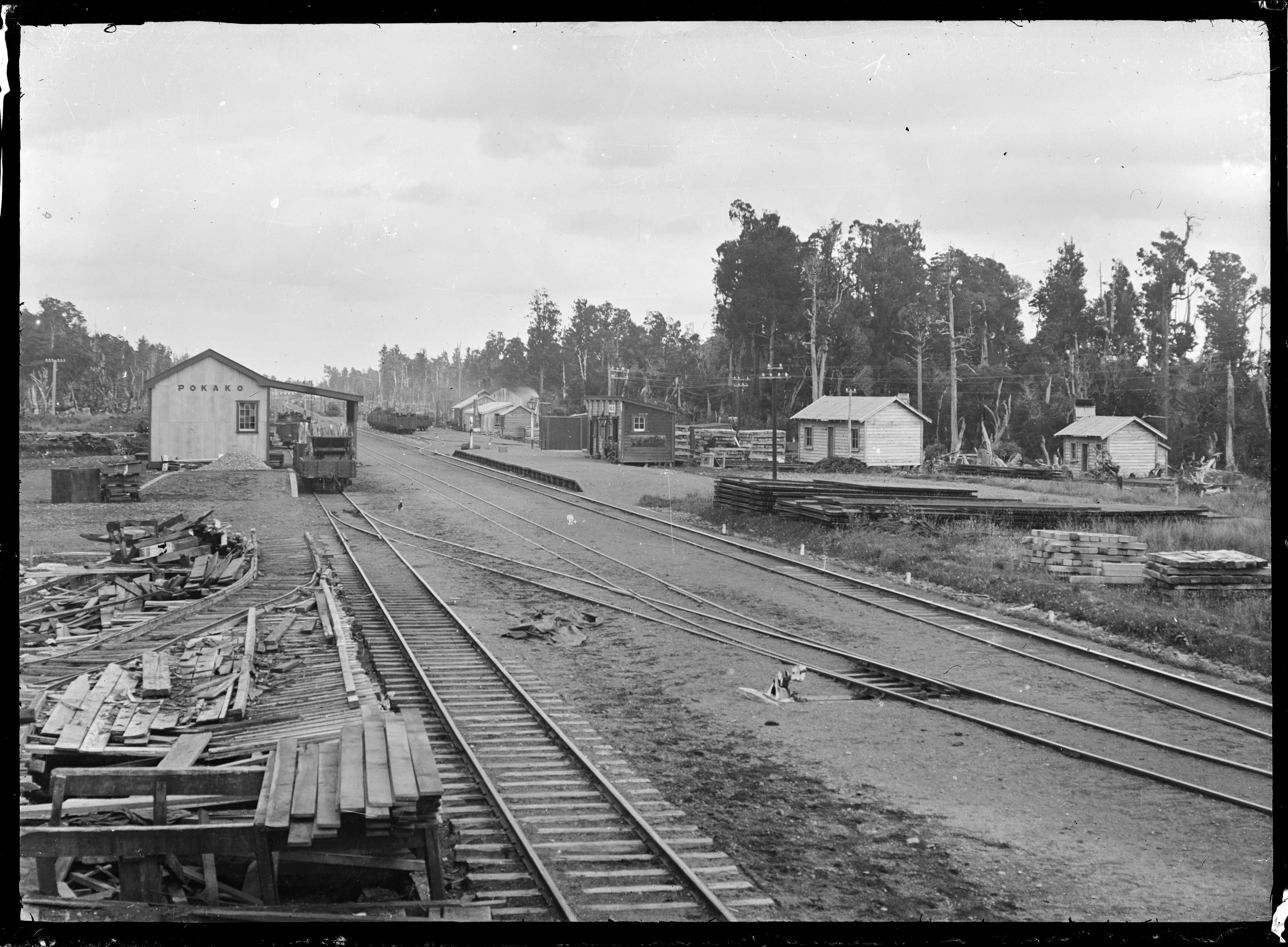
Pokaka Railway Station, c. 1924

Pokaka is a locality 12 km (7.5 mi) south of the village National Park in Ruapehu District, Manawatū-Whanganui region, the Central North Island of New Zealand.

Pokaka is located inside the Tongariro National Park.

Pokaka is home to the Taylor Memorial Lodge since 1978, made from three station houses, situated from the original Pokaka Train Station which was used to support the local saw mill. Pokaka is used by schools and community groups for educational visits and of course the local hiking and mountain bike/ski tracks.
