= Lake Ohau Alpine Village =

- Village
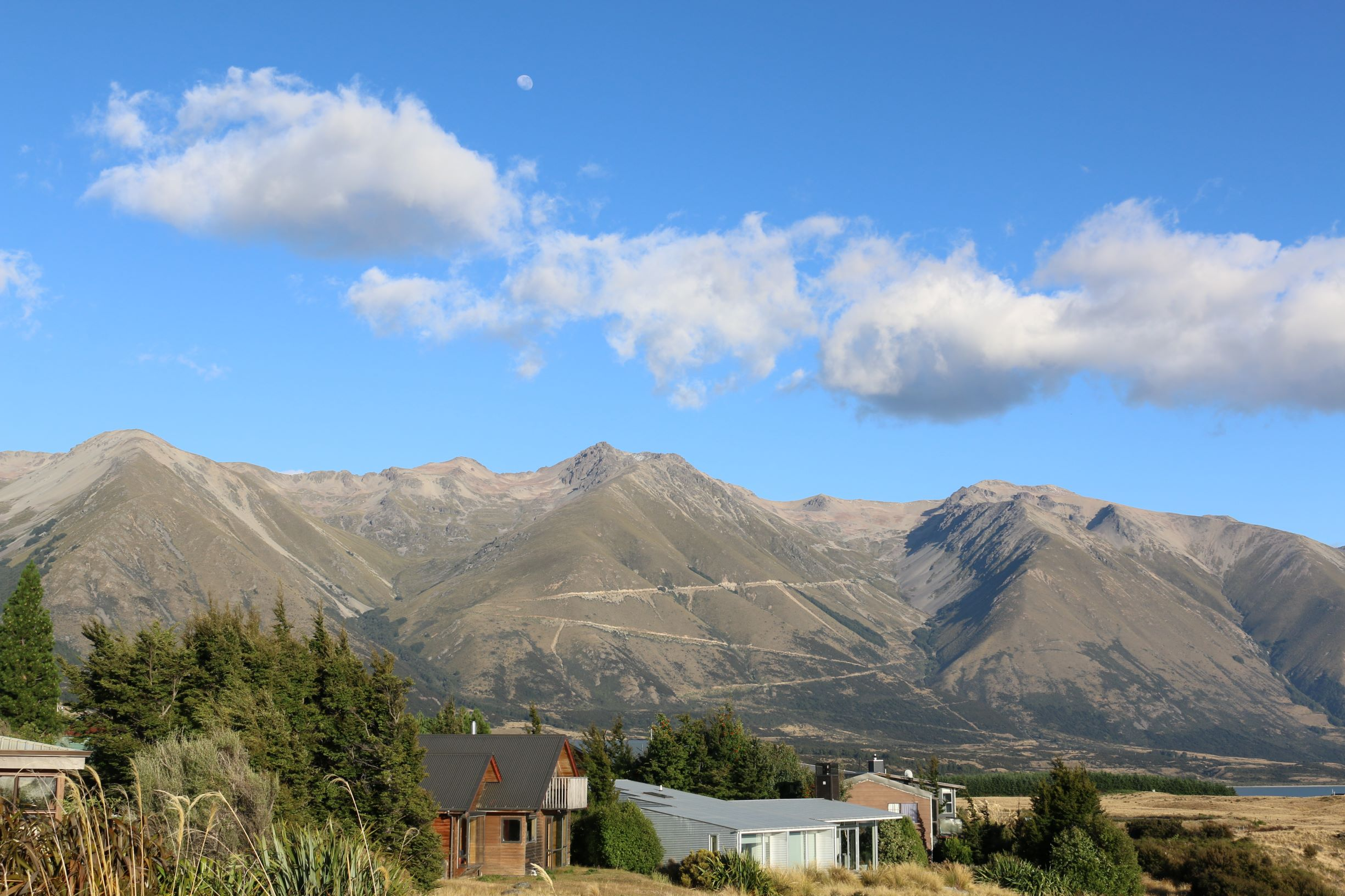
- Lake Ohau Alpine Village in summer (with the Ōhau Ski Field in the background; Feb 2018)

- Location within New Zealand
- Coordinates: 44°16′15.6″S 169°50′49.2″E
- Country: New Zealand
- Region: Canterbury
- Territorial authority: Waitaki District
- Time zone: UTC+12 (NZST)
  - Summer (DST): UTC+13 (NZDT)
- Local iwi: Ngāi Tahu

Lake Ohau Alpine Village, often referred to simply as Lake Ohau, is a village on the western shore of Lake Ōhau in New Zealand.

Lake Ohau village is located in the Waitaki District in Canterbury, 20 km (12 mi) west of Twizel. There are about 140 sections available in the village, with about half of these have houses built on them with a total of 75 houses. Of these, 48 are now uninhabitable or have burned to the ground. Many of these houses are holiday homes, with 18 permanent residents across 12 houses before the October 2020 fire.

== History ==
There were a number of attempts over the years to develop a village on the shores of Lake Ōhau. Sections were first offered in 1981. In 1983 planning consent was obtained from the Waitaki District Council. The first stage of the development involved 31 sections with an average size of 600 square metres. House were to be no higher than 4 metres tall and fences were not permitted in order to avoid the view of the lake being blocked out. Work started on the subdivision in 1985 with the first houses built in 1986. No commercial buildings were ever permitted by the Waitaki District Council. The second stage of the subdivision was planned for 1995 but only started in 2003.

In 2010, residents formed the Lake Ohau Alpine Village Ratepayers and Residents Association, which has actively lobbied for issues such as a reduction in street lighting to enable better star gazing conditions.

The Lake Ōhau water supply has been unsafe to drink without boiling first for a number of years. In December 2018 the Waitaki District Council intended to upgrade the water supply to make it compliant with the New Zealand Drinking Water Standards. This planned water supply upgrade for Lake Ōhau was put on hold in September 2019. Talks were to resume in February 2020. There had been disagreements over the upgrades with residents complaining about the "overblown" proposal by Waitaki District Council.

In the early hours of 4 October 2020, a large vegetation fire broke out nearby. High winds fanned the flames through the village and many of the village homes burned down. Residents and visitors evacuated themselves before the fire arrived. On 5 October, local authorities confirmed that 48 houses had been destroyed as a result of the fire. The fire insurance claims are estimated to be $34.8 million. These include 154 house and contents claims, 24 motor claims, and 19 business/commercial claims.
