= Ōhau A =

Hydroelectric power station in New Zealand

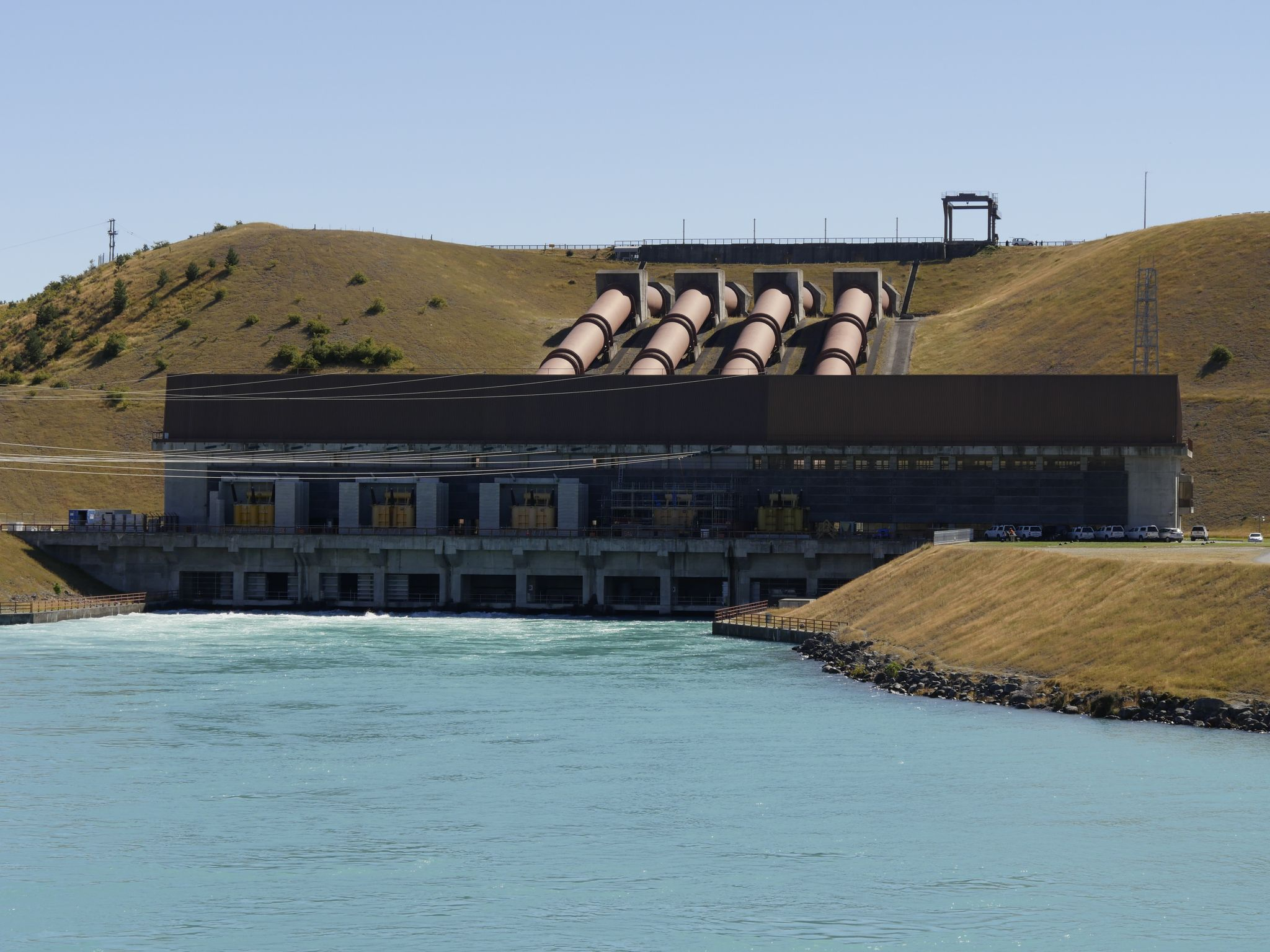
- Country: New Zealand
- Location: Canterbury
- Coordinates: 44°15′52″S 170°1′56″E
- Status: Operational
- Commission date: 1979
- Owner: Meridian Energy
- Operator: Meridian Energy

Thermal power station
- Primary fuel: Hydroelectric

Power generation
- Units operational: 4
- Nameplate capacity: 264 MW (354,000 hp)
- Annual net output: 1,150 GWh (4,100 TJ)

External links
- Commons: Related media on Commons

Ōhau A is a hydroelectric power station in the Mackenzie Basin, Canterbury, New Zealand. Operated by Meridian Energy, it is one of the three Ōhau stations in the Upper Waitaki hydro scheme. The station is located at the end of the man-made Pūkaki canal, where water from Lake Pūkaki joins flows from the Ōhau canal before passing through the station into Lake Ruataniwha.

== History and construction ==
Ōhau A was the third station built as part of the Upper Waitaki hydro scheme. The wider scheme began in 1968, and Twizel was established as a construction town for the project. Construction of Ōhau A began in 1971 and the station was commissioned in 1979.

During construction, approximately 2 million cubic metres of rock and gravel were excavated from the northern bank of the Ōhau River, and a further 500,000 cubic metres were removed for the tailrace tunnel. The Upper Waitaki works also altered the hydrology of the Mackenzie Basin by combining waters from Lakes Tekapo, Pūkaki and Ōhau, and by creating Lake Ruataniwha with a dam on the Ōhau River.

A rowing course was also developed on Lake Ruataniwha during the project, and the lake later became a national rowing venue.

== Description ==
Ōhau A has four 66-megawatt generating units with a total installed capacity of 264 MW. It forms part of the Upper Waitaki hydro scheme, which includes the three Ōhau stations, the two Tekapo stations, two dams and six canals.

== See also ==
- Ōhau B
- Ōhau C
- List of power stations in New Zealand
- Electricity sector in New Zealand
