= Ōhau B =

Hydroelectric power station in New Zealand

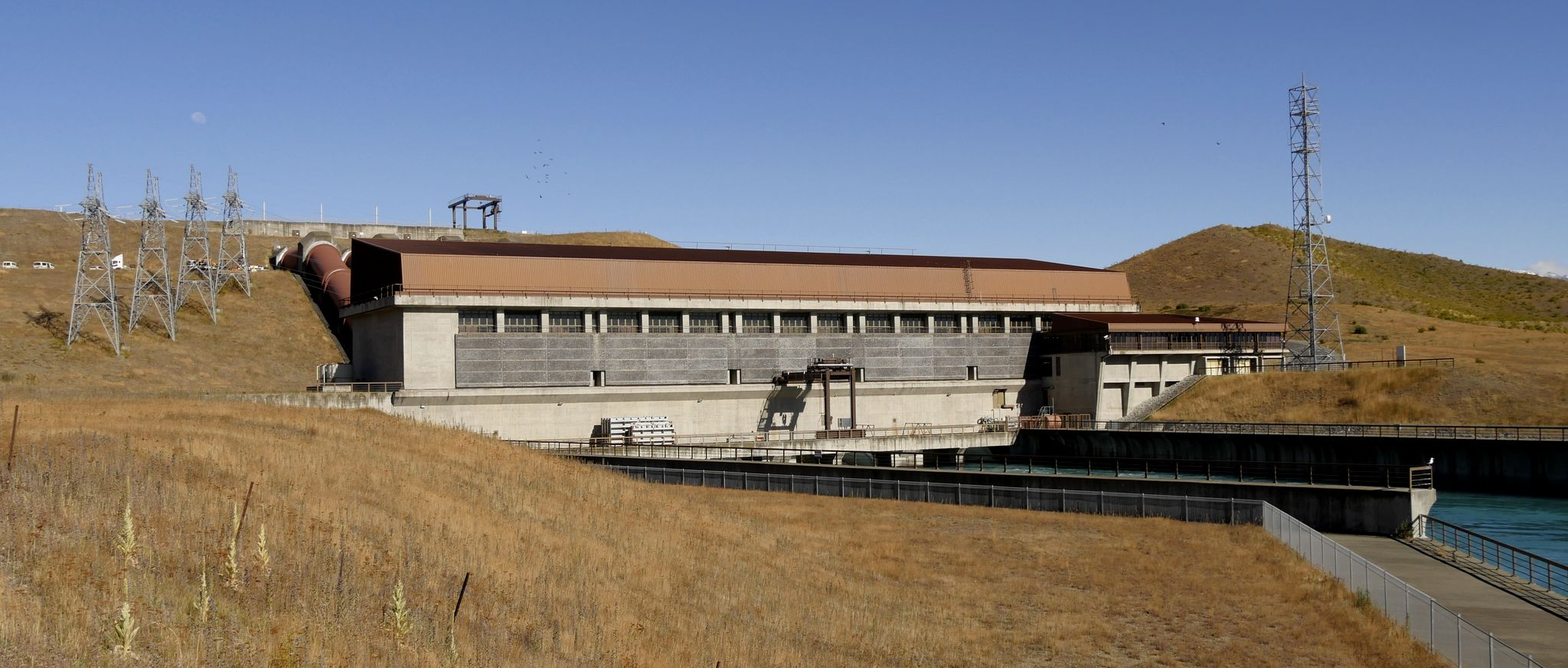
- Country: New Zealand
- Location: Canterbury
- Coordinates: 44°17′58″S 170°6′44″E
- Status: Operational
- Commission date: 1984
- Owner: Meridian Energy
- Operator: Meridian Energy

Thermal power station
- Primary fuel: Hydroelectric

Power generation
- Units operational: 4
- Nameplate capacity: 212 MW (284,000 hp)

External links
- Commons: Related media on Commons

Ōhau B is a hydroelectric power station in the Mackenzie Basin, Canterbury, New Zealand. Operated by Meridian Energy, it is one of the three Ōhau stations in the Upper Waitaki hydro scheme. It is a twin station to Ōhau C, and water from Lake Ruataniwha passes through Ōhau B before entering the Ōhau C canal on its way to Ōhau C and Lake Benmore.

== History and construction ==
Ōhau B was built as part of the Upper Waitaki hydro scheme, which began in 1968. Construction of the station began in 1977 and it became fully operational in 1984.

Lake Ruataniwha, from which Ōhau B draws its water, was created during the Upper Waitaki works by damming the Ōhau River.

== Description ==
Ōhau B has four 53-megawatt generating units with a total installed capacity of 212 MW. It was designed as a twin station to Ōhau C, with the two stations having similar equipment and the same generating capacity. The 2025 WSP hydro-schemes report states that each of the two twin stations produces approximately 958 GWh of electricity annually.

== See also ==
- Ōhau A
- List of power stations in New Zealand
- Electricity sector in New Zealand
