= Ōhau C =

Hydropower plant on New Zealand

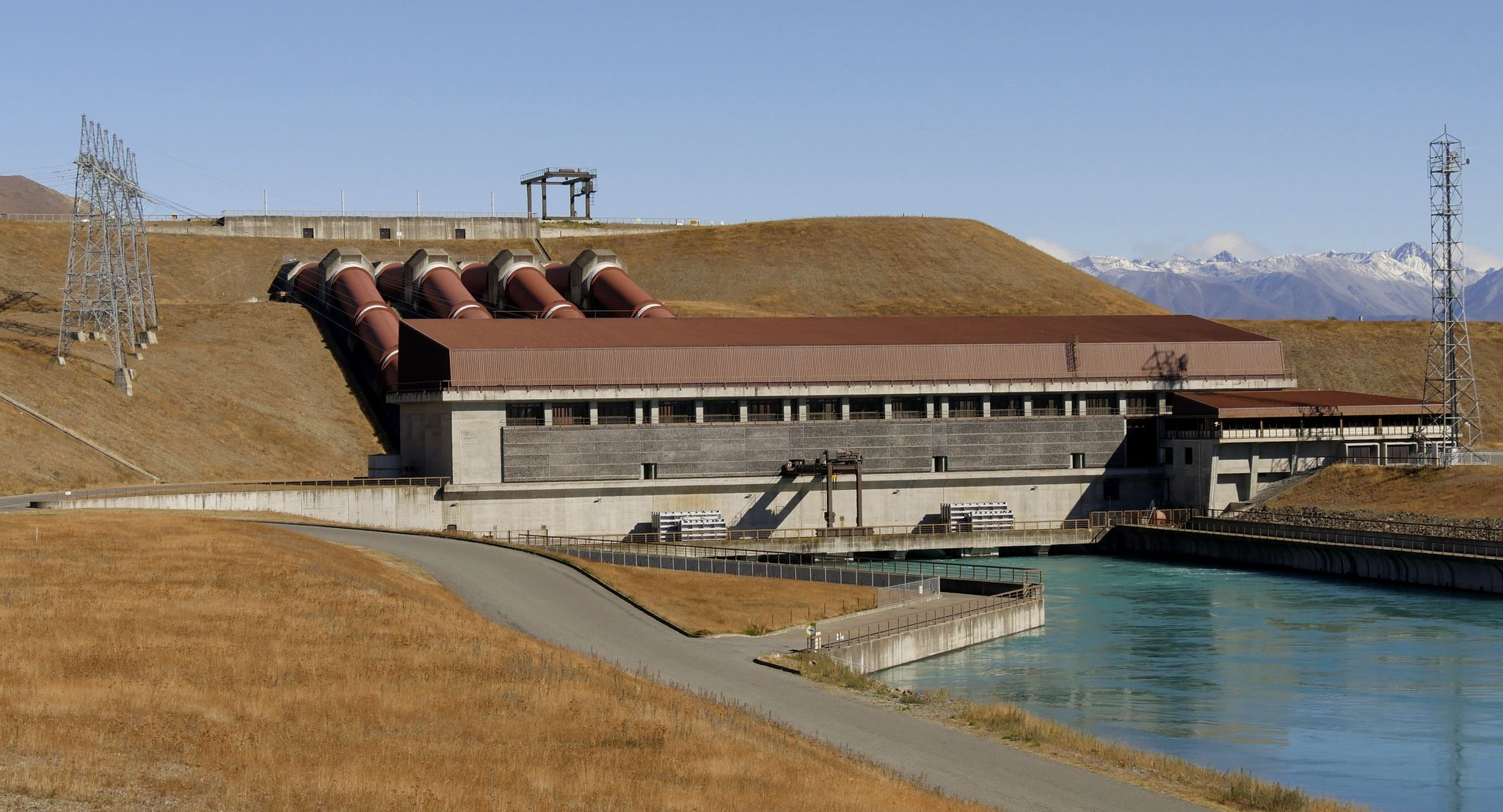
- Country: New Zealand
- Location: Canterbury
- Coordinates: 44°20′31″S 170°10′56″E
- Status: Operational
- Commission date: 1985
- Owner: Meridian Energy
- Operator: Meridian Energy

Thermal power station
- Primary fuel: Hydroelectric

Power generation
- Units operational: 4
- Nameplate capacity: 212 MW (284,000 hp)

External links
- Commons: Related media on Commons

Ōhau C is a hydroelectric power station in the Mackenzie Basin, Canterbury, New Zealand. Operated by Meridian Energy, it is one of the three Ōhau stations in the Upper Waitaki hydro scheme. It is a twin station to Ōhau B, and receives water that has already passed through Ōhau B from Lake Ruataniwha, before discharging into Lake Benmore.

== History and construction ==
Construction of Ōhau C began in 1979 and the station became fully operational in 1985. It was the last hydro station built on the Waitaki scheme, completing the scheme 56 years after construction began on the Waitaki dam and power station in 1928.

The Upper Waitaki hydro scheme comprises the three Ōhau stations, the two Tekapo stations, two dams and six canals. Its development also created Lake Ruataniwha, the newest lake in the Waitaki Basin.

== Description ==
Ōhau C has four 53-megawatt generating units with a total installed capacity of 212 MW. Like Ōhau B, it uses similar equipment and has the same generating capacity; the 2025 WSP hydro-schemes report states that each of the twin stations produces approximately 958 GWh annually.

== See also ==
- Ōhau A
- List of power stations in New Zealand
- Electricity sector in New Zealand
