= Horopito railway station =

Railway station in New Zealand

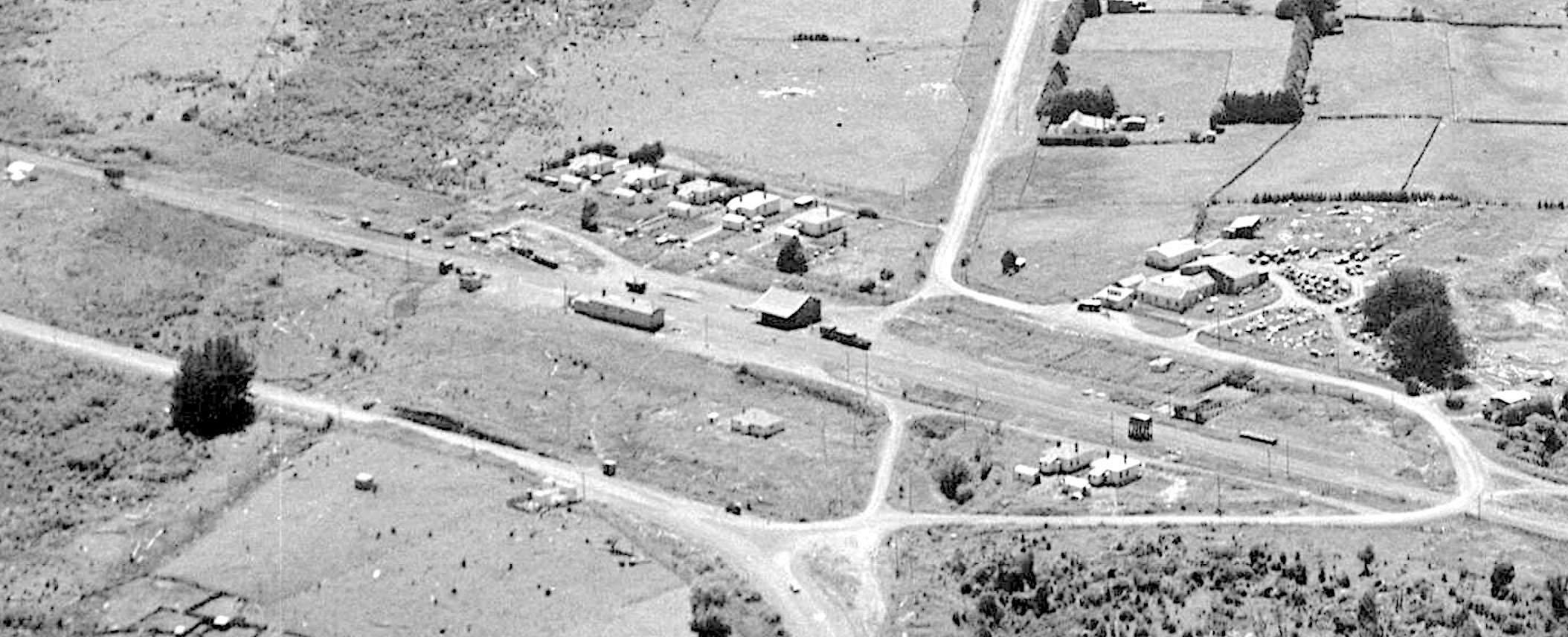
- Horopito in 1957

General information
- Location: Horopito, New Zealand
- Coordinates: 39.343657°S 175.378017°E
- Elevation: 752 m (2,467 ft)
- Line: North Island Main Trunk
- Distance: Wellington 327.5 km (203.5 mi)

History
- Opened: in use from 31 May 1907 goods 12 August 1907 passengers 15 February 1909
- Closed: goods 19 September 1986 passengers before December 1975
- Electrified: June 1988

Services
Preceding station	Historical railways	Following station
Pokaka; Line open station closed 5.52 km (3.43 mi)	North Island Main Trunk; KiwiRail	Ohakune; Line open station open 10.16 km (6.31 mi)
Location

Horopito was a station on the North Island Main Trunk line in the Ruapehu District of New Zealand. It served the small village of Horopito and lies just to the north of two of the five largest NIMT viaducts. It and Pokaka also lay to the south of Makatote Viaduct, the late completion of which held up opening of the station.

A passing loop remains at the station site.

== History ==
Surveying for the route between Hīhītahi and Piriaka began in 1894. The line opened from Waiouru to Rangataua for goods traffic on 12 August 1907 and a mail coach ran between the railheads at Raurimu and Rangataua, serving Horopito on the way. A stationmaster was appointed by March 1908.

A telephone line from the north was in place by 1907, but a link to Mataroa was not installed until 1909.

In August 1908 Horopito was the point where engines were changed on the first through train, to reduce its weight to negotiate the still unballasted track to the north.

Work on the station building began in November 1908. A 5th class station was built by September 1909 for around £3,340. When opened, Horopito had rooms for a stationmaster, lobby, luggage, urinals and ladies, on a 300 ft (91 m) by 15 ft (4.6 m) platform. There was also an engine shed, a 40 ft (12 m) by 30 ft (9.1 m) goods shed with verandah, two 4,000 imp gal (18,000 L; 4,800 US gal) water tanks, a loading bank, cattle and sheep yards and a cart approach. There was a tablet and fixed signals. Railway workers' cottages were built from 1907. A crossing loop could take 60 wagons, extended to 80 in 1955. Electric lighting was installed after 1924.

The station building was replaced by a prefabricated shelter shed in 1971. On 19 September 1986 the station closed to all traffic.

== Gallery ==
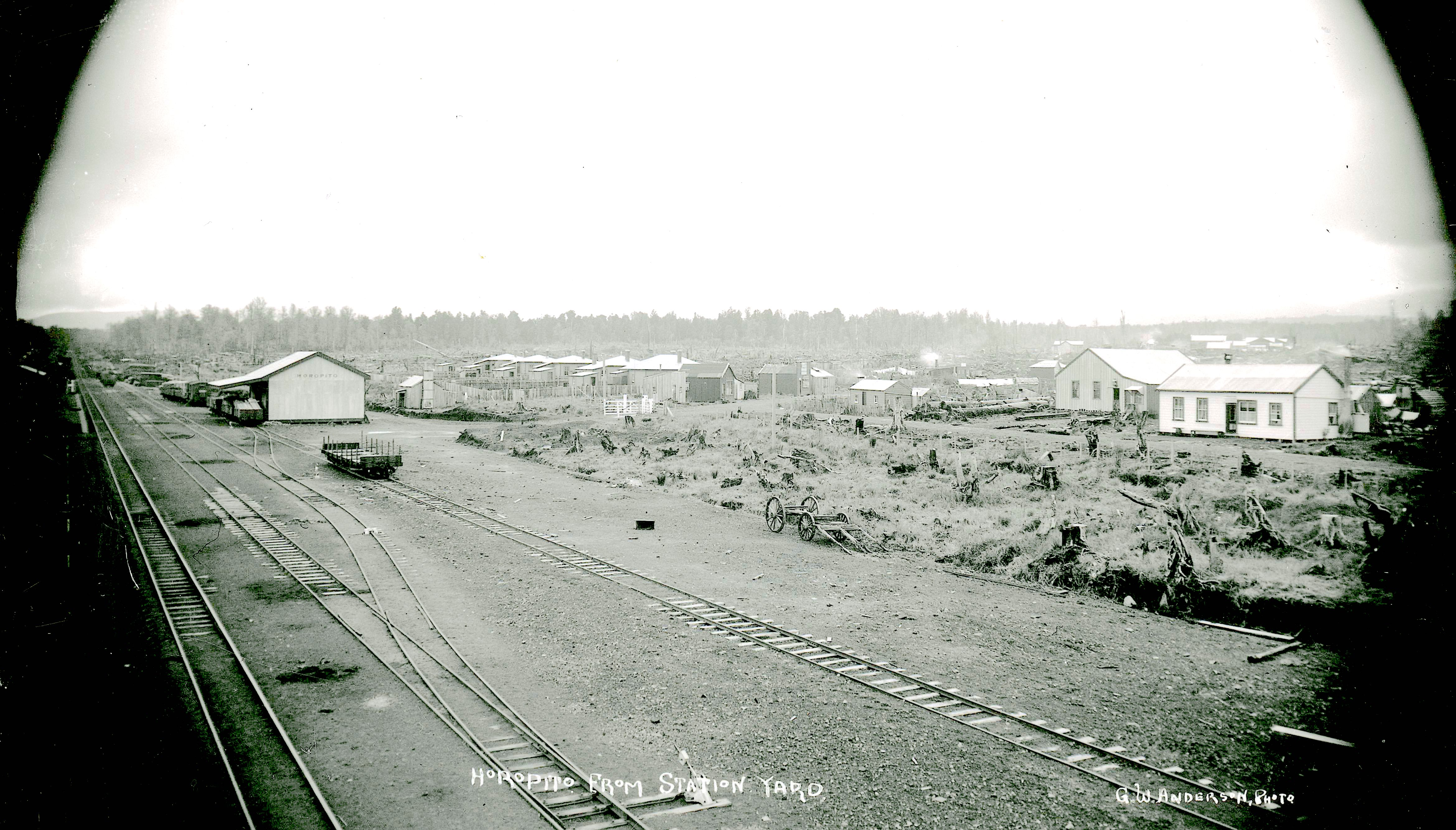
Horopito station about 1910

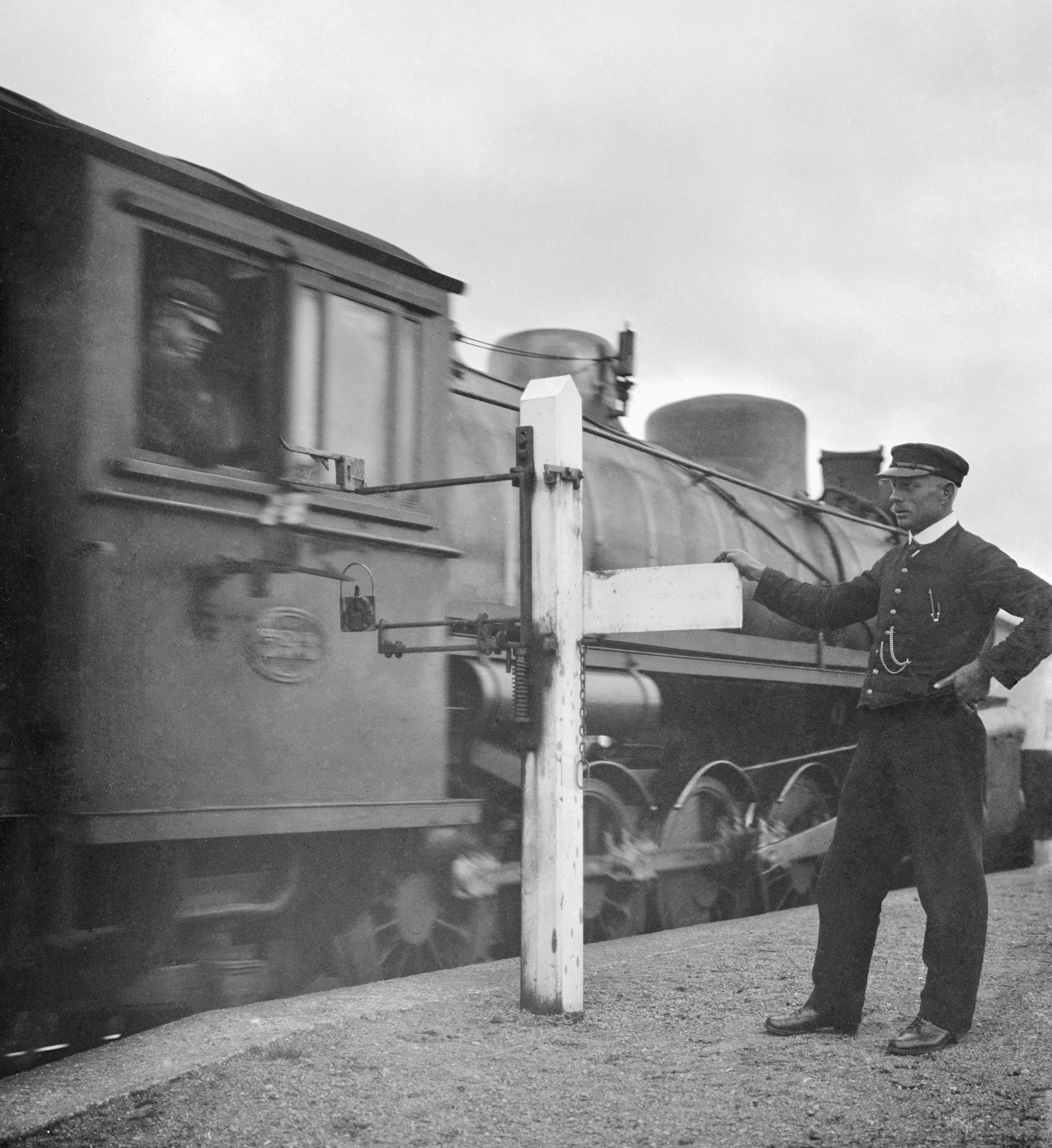
Exchanging signalling tablets, which authorise entry to the next section of track, between a moving X class locomotive and Horopito railway station in 1920.

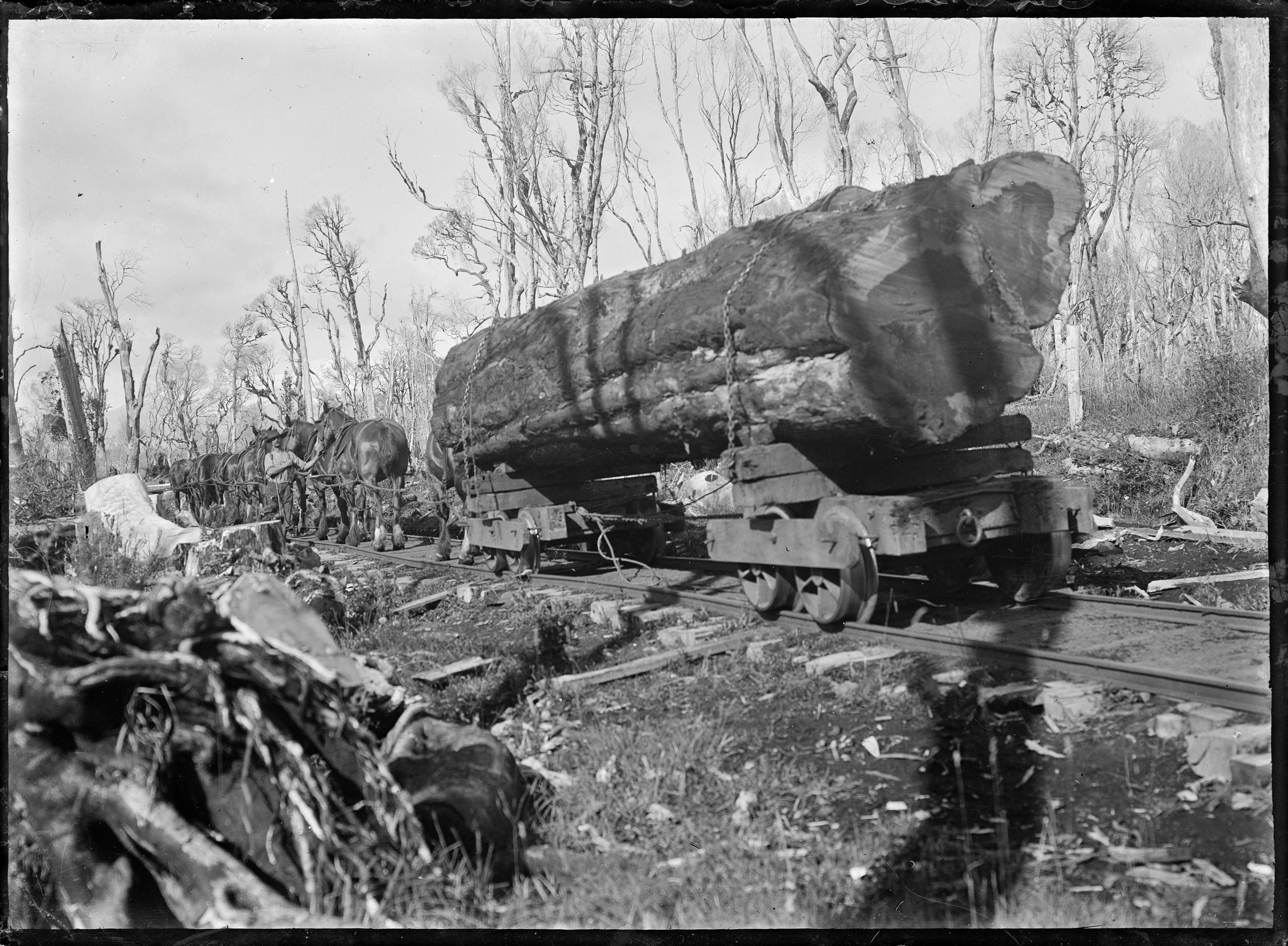
Horse-drawn timber wagon hauling a log to a mill at Horopito in 1921

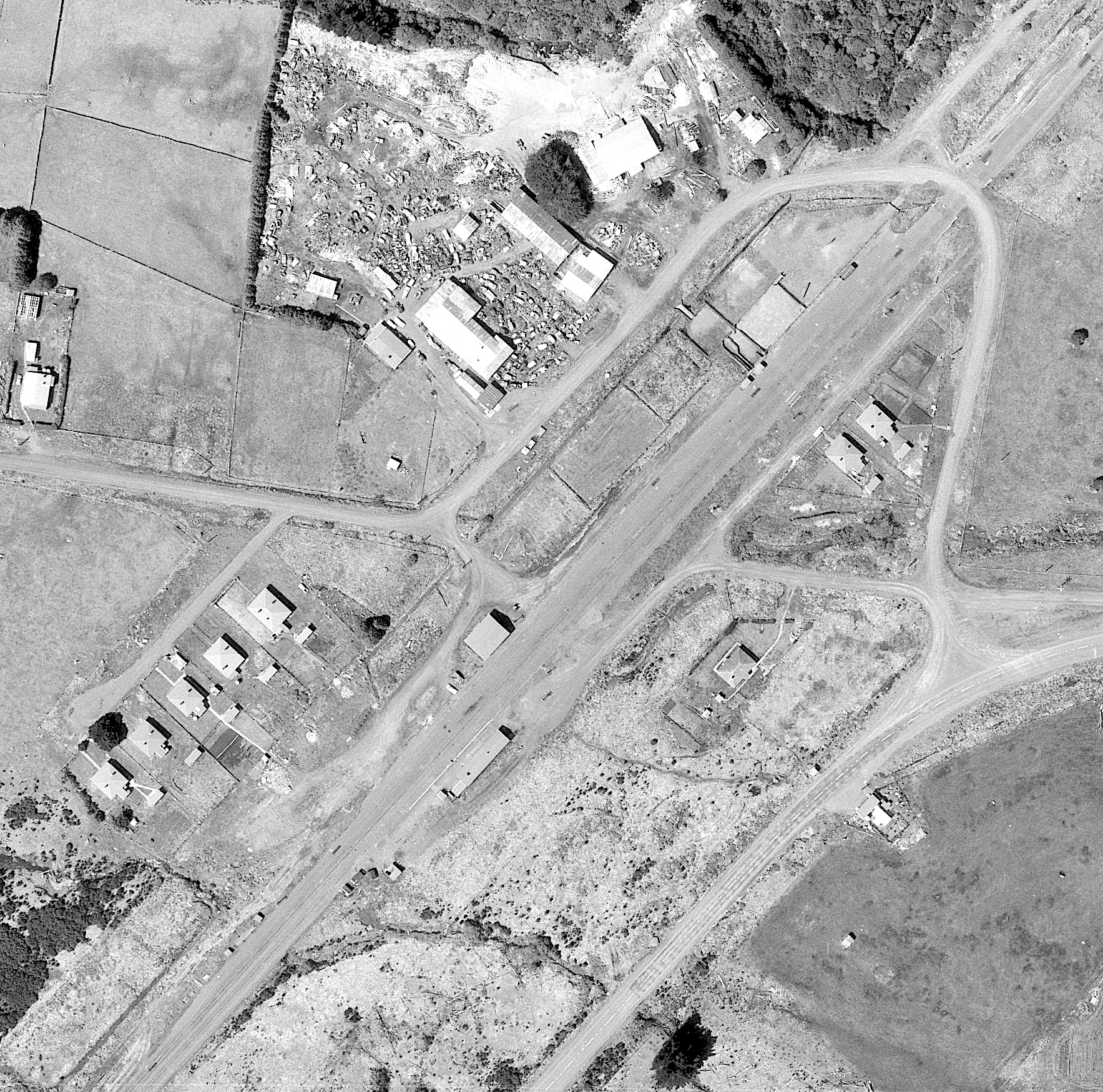
Horopito in 1964

== Timber ==
Like the other stations along this part of NIMT, Horopito had freight from several timber mills.

R A Wilson & Co had a mill about 3 mi (4.8 km) from the station, linked by a private siding from 1908. Berg Brothers had a mill from at least 1908 to 1921, with a horse-drawn tramway. A tramway to the Mangaturuturu valley was still in use in 1938. Mr Harland built a mill for cutting manoao into sleepers in 1909. In 1912 Silver Pine Timber Co opened a mill for the same timber about 1 mi (1.6 km) from the station. Cowern & Co had several tramways east of the station. Another sawmill had a short tramway south of the station. Orata Mill burnt down in the 1918 Raetihi fire, but was still working in 1924.

Taonui viaduct
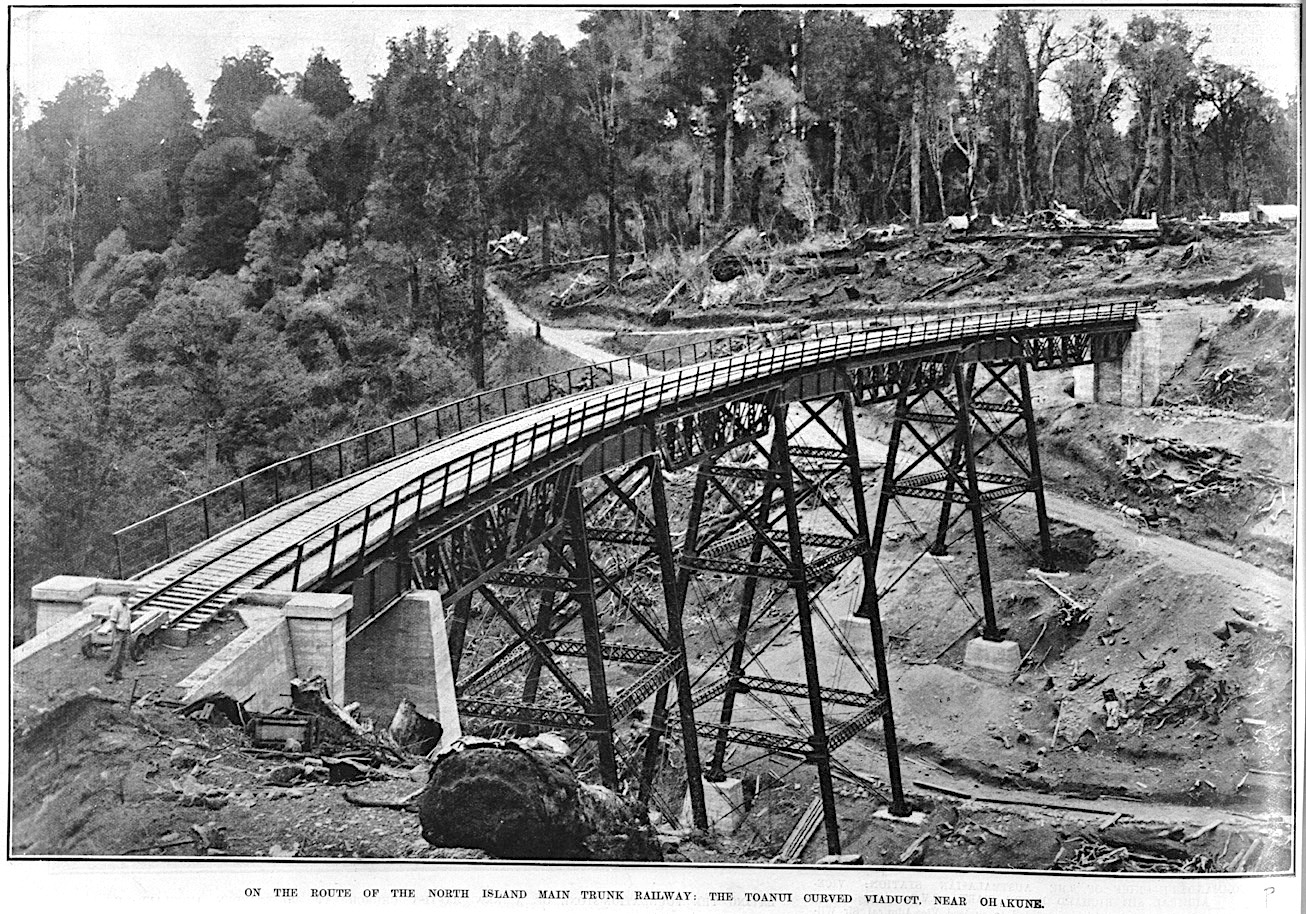
- Taonui Viaduct in 1908
- Coordinates: 39.36842°S 175.37166°E
- Carries: Single track of the North Island Main Trunk
- Crosses: Taonui Stream
- Owner: Department of Conservation

Characteristics
- Total length: 400 feet (120 m)
- Height: 111 feet (34 m)

History
- Engineering design by: PWD
- Construction start: 1906
- Opened: February 1908
- Replaced by: 29 June 1987 reinforced concrete viaduct 100 metres (330 ft) long and 20 metres (66 ft) high

Heritage New Zealand – Category 1
- Designated: 27 March 2009
- Reference no.: 9266

== Viaducts ==
Two of NIMT's main viaducts are to the south of Horopito, where the line crosses valleys descending steeply from Mount Ruapehu. Both were designed by Peter Seton Hay, supervised by Resident Engineer, Frederick William Furkert, both had 201 m (659 ft) radius curves, and both were replaced on 29 June 1987 by a 10 km (6.2 mi) deviation, begun in 1984. As early as the 1960s there had been calls to bypass the viaducts, as they'd had a 20 mph (32 km/h) speed restriction, due to their tight radius, since the 1930s. Hapuawhenua Viaduct would have also required costly underpinning. The old viaducts were transferred to the Department of Conservation, in a like for like swap of land between DoC and the Railways Department. From Saturday 14 February 2009 they became part of the Mountains to Sea Trail.

Both viaducts are made up of lattice steel piers on concrete footings, supporting 36 ft (11m) plate steel spans, interspersed with 64 ft (20m) Pratt truss steel girders. The lattice piers were built a tier at a time, using guy lines attached to derricks. Access to the pier heads was by ladder. The pier head girders weighed about 3½ tons, and the truss girders 9½ tons. They were positioned with derricks. The steelwork was prepared at PWD's Mangaonoho workshop, near the southernmost of the main viaducts. It was railed northwards to the Hapuawhenua valley floor, over a temporary, sharply curved and graded, 1 mi 48 ch (2.6 km) line from Ohakune, which was built in 1906. Material for Taonui was then carted along the coach road.

There are also bridges over one of the tributaries of the Taonui, and a, bridge over the Makotuku River, which is just south of Horopito. Makotuku Viaduct was one of those on NIMT built by Andersons of Christchurch. Hapuawhenua, or Mole, Tunnel was 10.3 ch (680 ft; 210 m) long and also bypassed in 1987.

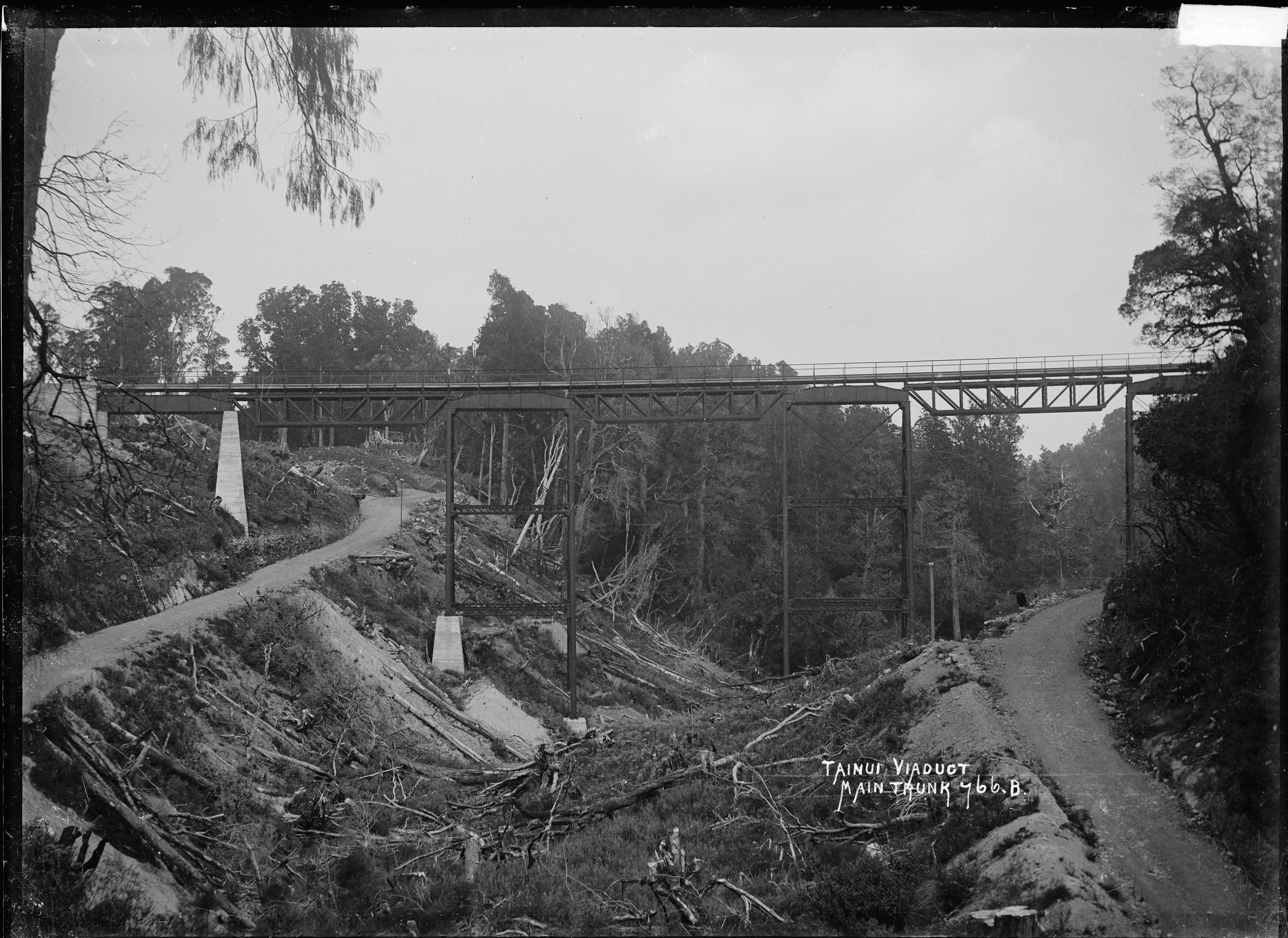
Taonui viaduct in 1900s

=== Taonui Viaduct ===
About 2.5 km (1.6 mi) south of Horopito, Taonui Viaduct is a straight concrete viaduct, 100 m (330 ft) long and up to 20 m (66 ft) high. It replaced the original curved viaduct, to the west.

That viaduct, further down the Taonui Stream, opened in February 1908. It is 400 ft (120 m) long and up to 111 ft (34 m) above the stream, on a 1 in 60 gradient. It has 3 steel piers supporting the central spans. The southern end has a concrete pier and abutments. Taonui was decked by February 1908, allowing coach passengers to walk across, while their coach wound around the road below. It was the first of 5 viaducts in the last portion of the NIMT to be finished, but the rails couldn't be linked to Ohakune until Hapuawhenua was ready in April 1908.

On 18 and 19 March 1918 the Raetihi fire damaged 70 ft (21 m) of sleepers, some of the parapet and set a truck on a goods train alight. The only significant additions were strengthening in 1934 and 1971.

After the deviation opened, the rails and decking were removed and some of the cuttings leading to it were filled with spoil from the new deviation. When the listing report was done in 2009, almost all the red-lead primer, last applied in 1964, was exposed and there was some rusting. There was also a comment that the footings could be adversely affected by moisture trapped by the vegetation. Plans to route the cycle trail over the viaduct have been shelved.

Hapuawhenua viaduct
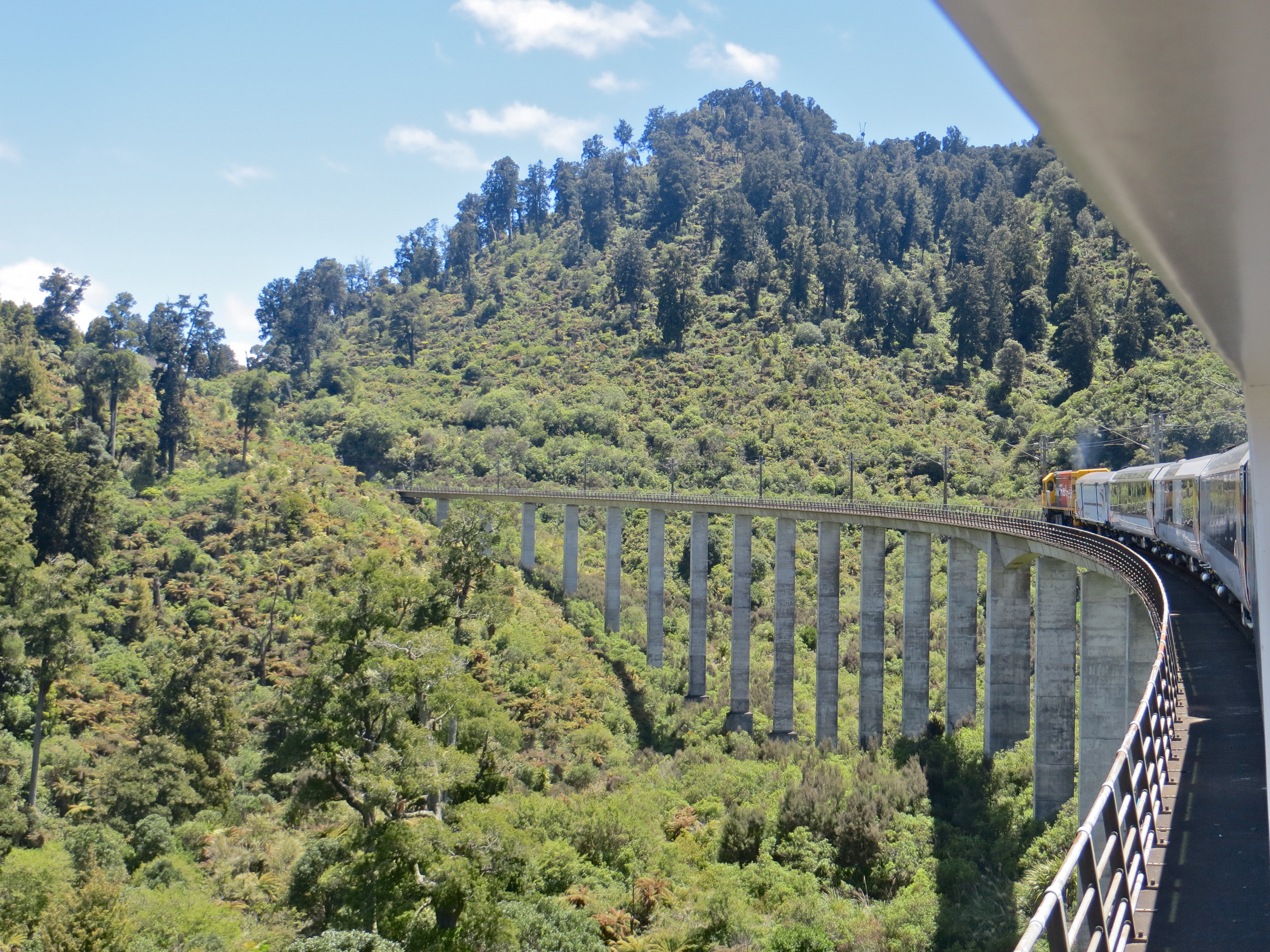
- Northern Explorer on Hapuawhenua Viaduct in 2012
- Coordinates: 39.38503°S 175.39955°E
- Carries: Single track of the North Island Main Trunk
- Crosses: Hapuawhenua Stream
- Owner: KiwiRail

Characteristics
- Total length: 284 metres (932 ft)
- Height: 45 metres (148 ft)

History
- Engineering design by: PWD
- Construction start: 1906
- Construction end: April 1908
- Replaced by: 29 June 1987 reinforced concrete viaduct 414 metres (1,358 ft) long and up to 51 metres (167 ft) high

Heritage New Zealand – Category 1
- Designated: 27 October 1995
- Reference no.: 7271

Location
- Interactive map of Hapuawhenua viaduct

=== Hapuawhenua Viaduct ===
A further 2.5 km (1.6 mi) south, Hapuawhenua Viaduct is built of reinforced and pre-stressed concrete, 414 m (1,358 ft) long and up to 51 m (167 ft) high. It too was rebuilt in 1987.

Further up the Hapuawhenua Stream, to the east, remains the viaduct completed in April 1908. It is 284 m (932 ft) long and up to 45 m (148 ft) high. It used 7,430 cu yd (5,680 m^{3}) of concrete, 1,252 tons of steel and 26,560 board feet (62.7 m^{3}) of timber.

By August 1907 the preparation of the Hapuawhenua site was complete and excavation of the footings began. Abutments and 13 concrete piers were complete by December 1907. Work had also begun on the 4 central steel piers, which were finished in January 1908.

Strengthening was done between 1925 and 1934, and again in 1971. It was painted in 1964, and telephone wire insulators were added to the western side.

When the deviation opened in 1987 the rails were removed and a walkway created using old sleepers and a new handrail.

In 1988 the viaduct was used by AJ Hackett for what may have been the first commercial bungy jumping in the world.

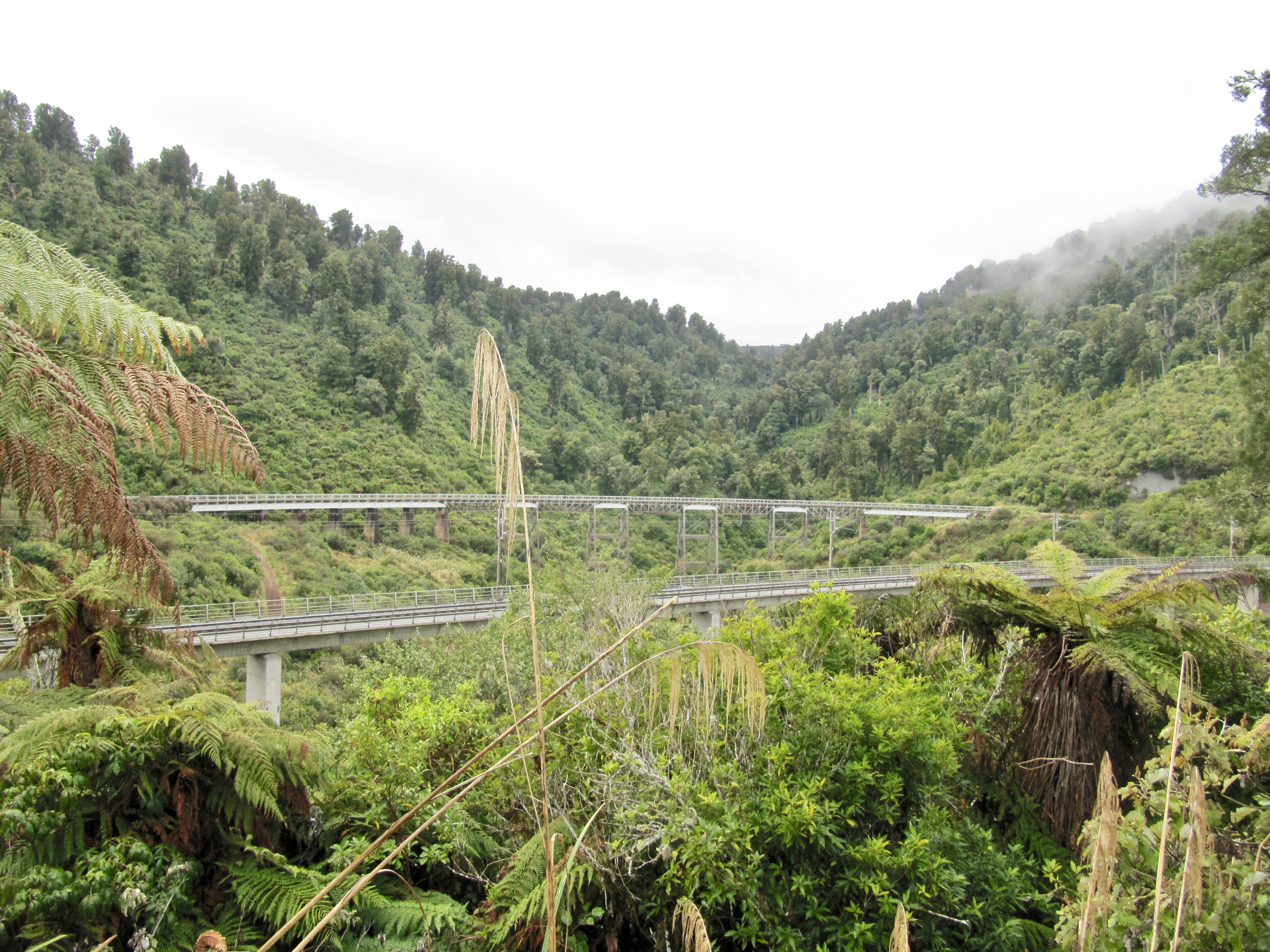
Hapuawhenua viaducts - 1908 at the back, 1987 in front

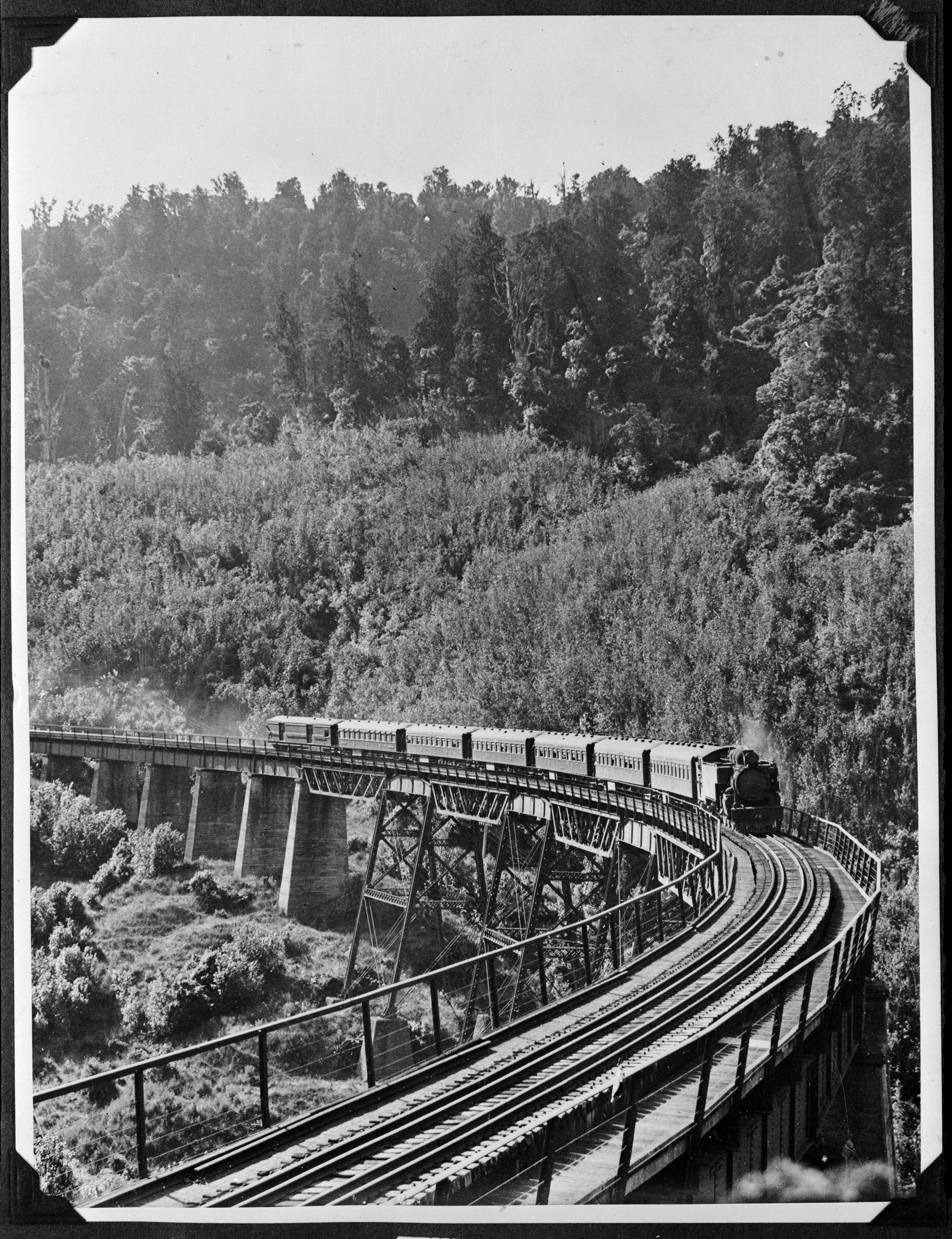
Hapuawhenua Viaduct about 1915

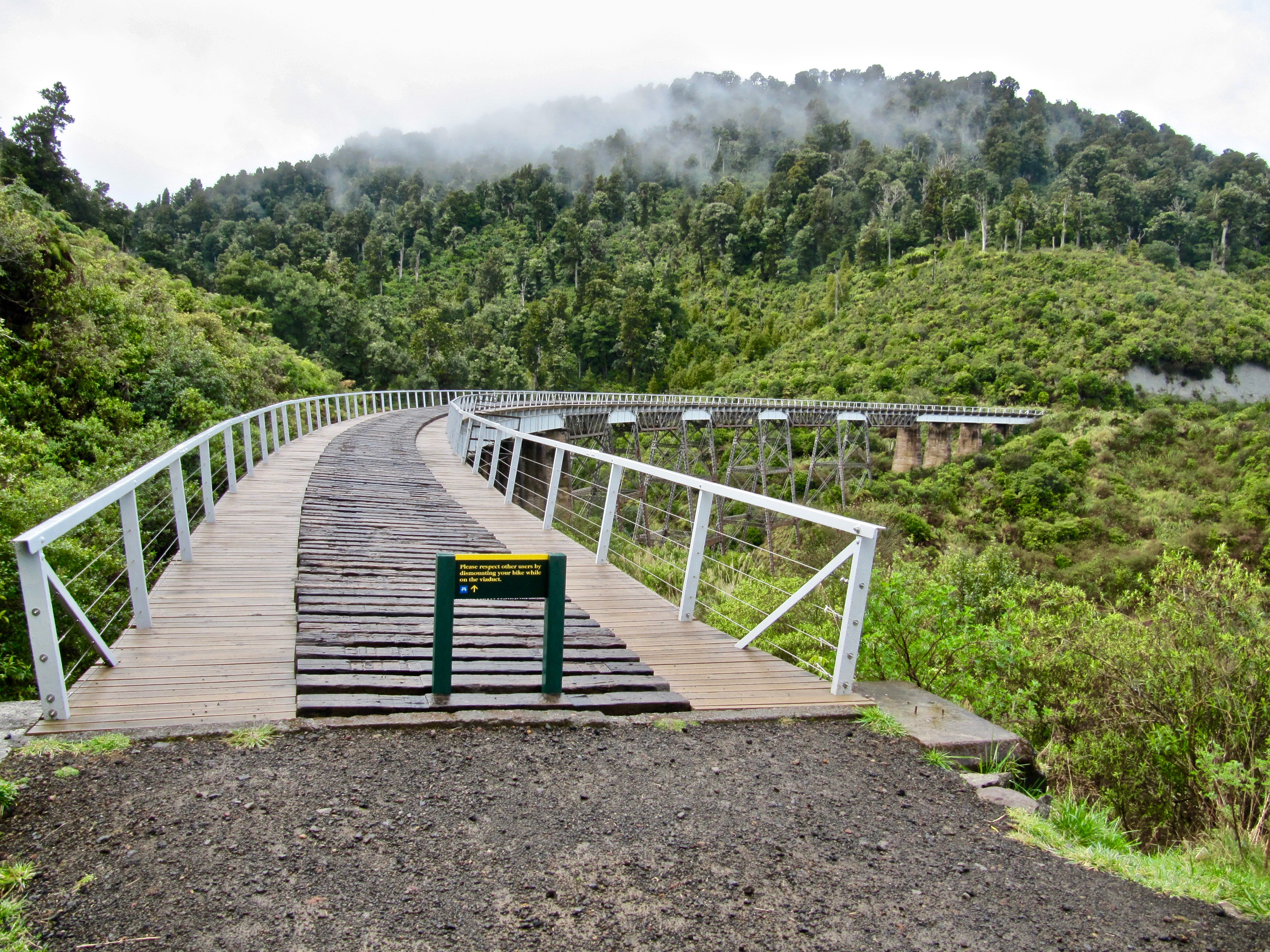
Hapuawhenua 1908 viaduct from the north

=== Old Coach Road ===
15 km (9.3 mi) of the Makatote-Ohakune Old Coach Road has been restored between Horopito and Ohakune. It mostly followed the route (with the exception of the section to Taonui Viaduct) of a bridle track completed in 1886, which had been upgraded to a dray road in 1895. It was mostly paved between 1904 and November 1906, mainly with setts to create an all-weather road for construction material along the line. From 11 November 1906 it was also used to carry passengers and goods between the northern and southern railheads, though as late as May 1907 there were complaints of mud making some parts impassable. However, a month later the road was described as very good and a daily coach was covering the 28 mi (45 km) between Raurimu and Rangataua. From 1 November 1907 Ohakune became the southern terminal. Early in 1908 the northern terminal advanced to Waimarino (now National Park), reducing the coach distance to 22 mi (35 km). In May 1908 the northern terminus became Makatote, with the coach trip reduced to 10 mi (16 km). About 2 mi (3.2 km) of the road was not paved, being covered only with pumice. After the opening of SH49 it fell into disuse. Like the viaducts, it has a Category I Historic Places status, though much later, from 5 October 2004, and was re-opened from 2009 as part of a cycle trail.
