= Raetihi forest fire =

1918 wildfire in New Zealand

Coordinates: 39.4°S 175.3°E

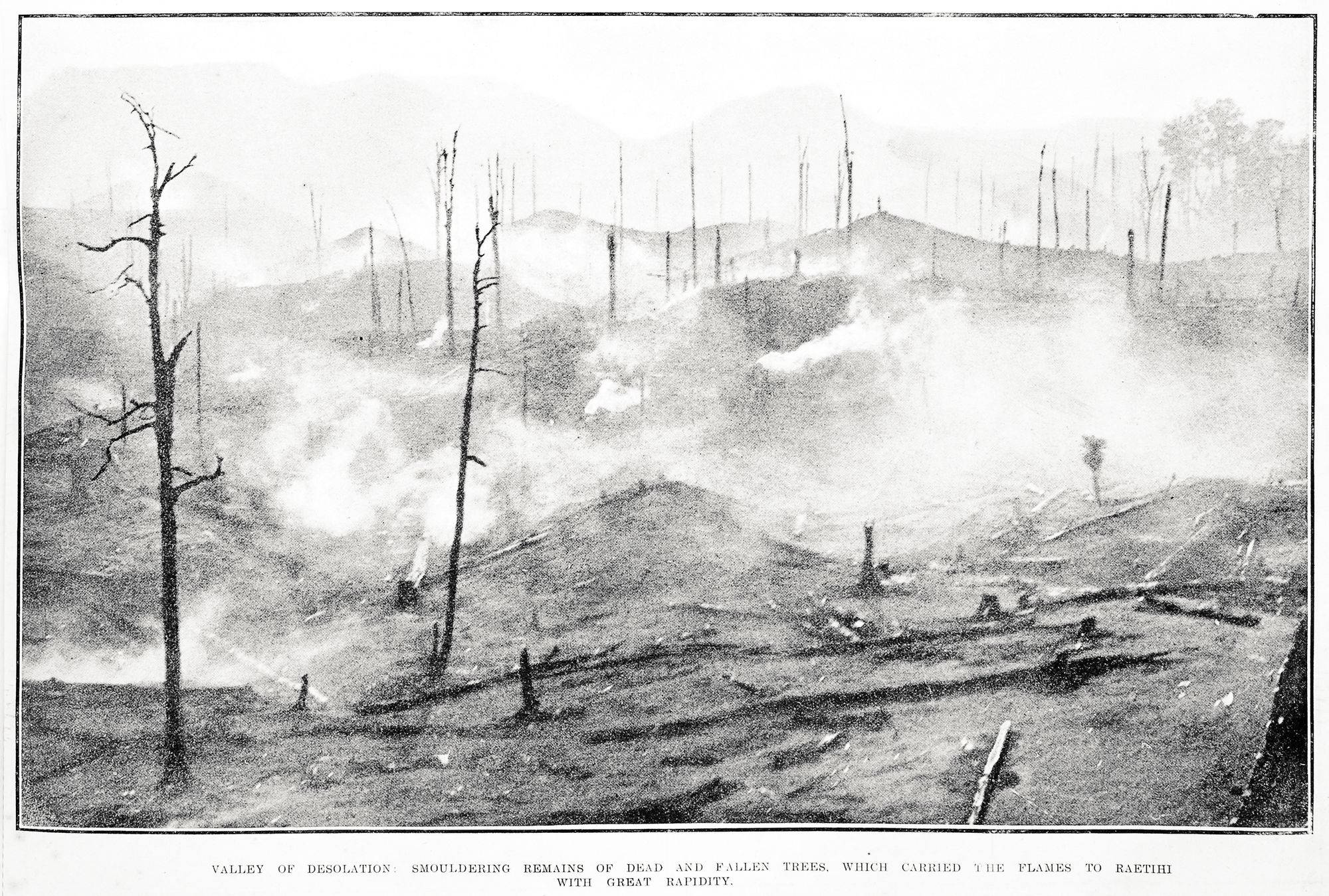
Remains of forest after the fire passed through.

The Raetihi forest fire was a catastrophic fire that occurred on 18–20 March 1918, in and around Raetihi, Horopito and Ohakune in the North Island of New Zealand. The fire almost destroyed the townships of Raetihi and Ohakune, killed thousands of sheep and cattle and destroyed areas of native forest in the North Island Volcanic Plateau of New Zealand.

== Origin of the fire ==
The area around Horopito where the fire is thought to have started had been in drought conditions for months. Dairy farmers would typically burn off the fields at the end of summer, and in March 1918 they set fires as usual to clear the land, believing the dry conditions would make the job easier. However, a cyclone with extremely strong winds reached the area while the fires were burning, leading to fires raging out of control for two days across the landscape of farms and forest. Showers fell on the whole district from midday on 19 March, but the fires weren't put out until heavy rain fell on the night of 19/20 March.

== Destruction ==
=== Raetihi ===
On the evening of 18 March, the wind in Raetihi became so strong that people had trouble standing. There was fire off in the distance, but at first the townspeople were not worried. However the wind changed direction and fire headed towards Raetihi on the night of 18/19 March, the cyclonic winds driving smoke, ash and sparks ahead of the blaze. People had to leave their homes at very short notice. The smoke was so thick that some people had to crawl on their hands and knees to safety, and many were temporarily blinded by smoke and ash. Some residents took refuge in culverts, creeks or water tanks, standing in water for hours as the cyclone-driven smoke and fire raged through the town.

The fire destroyed many buildings in Raetihi, including three churches, the police station, council offices, a maternity home and various businesses. A Māori pā, over fifty homes in Raetihi and nine sawmills in the surrounding area were destroyed. Phone and telegraphic lines were cut and power went out. In Ohakune, people realised that Raetihi was in trouble, so early on the morning of 19 March two relief trains were sent along the new branch line from Ohakune to Raetihi to rescue people. The train sounded its whistle continuously at Raetihi to guide people towards the station through the thick smoke and darkness. Blinded people had to be guided on to the trains. Hundreds of refugees were taken from Raetihi to Ohakune, described in newspaper reports:

Children in their night attire, men and women in working clothes, with swollen eyes and blackened faces, spoke of the terrible and trying time they had gone through. Those who saw the sight declared it to be the most pitiable they had ever seen.

Children with hardly any covering, no headgear, no stockings, and wet through. The mothers were trying to shelter the youngsters, and there was no attempt at toilet [i.e. maintaining a tidy appearance].[ ... ] Just as one train arrived the rain came down heavier, the confusion in consequence being fearful—crying children, sobbing mothers, and fathers being led, for they were nearly blind after fighting for their homes out back. The whole formed a heart-rending scene.

=== Other damage ===
The only fatalities of the fire were the Akersten family of three, who died after leaving their farmhouse for the surrounding bush. Several sawmills and seventeen houses were destroyed at Horopito, as well as houses at Rangataua and some houses and sawmills on the outskirts of Ohakune. Fortunately the heavy rain arrived in time to save Ohakune. A road bridge near Raetihi was destroyed, and the southbound Main Trunk train had to stop at Horopito after the Taonui Viaduct was partially burnt. Three hundred train passengers were temporarily looked after at Horopito along with fire refugees.

Many thousands of sheep and cattle died in the fire. People could hear the terrified and dying animals calling out over the fire and wind, but were unable to save them.

The government estimated that almost 20,000 acres of grass was burned. Trees in unmilled forests were burned or blown down by the cyclonic winds, but only about 100 acres of timber on Crown land was destroyed.

== Smoke across the North Island ==
On 19 March, townships across the lower North Island woke to dense smoke and "uncanny" darkness. In Feilding and Palmerston North, people had to use artificial lighting indoors in shops and businesses and car drivers needed to put their headlights on, and in Carterton factories and schools closed because of the poor visibility. In Wanganui, people called out the fire brigade, thinking that the fire was nearby. A thick haze covered the city until lunchtime, and visibility was down to a few hundred yards. There were rumours that Mount Ngauruhoe had erupted.

Wellington also faced thick smoke. The ferry Mararoa from Lyttelton arrived at Cook Strait at daybreak, but the ship's navigators could not see the Wellington Heads, the entrance to Wellington Harbour. They had to take soundings and reverse several times until they could find their way, causing the ship to be four and a half hours late berthing in Wellington.

The smoke that reached dairying districts far from the fire adversely affected the milk received at factories in those locations. Cheese made from this milk had a distinct smoky flavour.

== Government and community response ==
Many of the victims of the fire had nothing but the clothes they were wearing when they fled. Immediately after communication was regained and word spread about the disaster, communities around New Zealand sent clothing and food to the area and set up relief funds, raising £14,000 in total. The government added £10,000 to the relief fund.

The government estimated that re-sowing grass on burned farmland would cost £35,000. The government paid up front for grass seed, to avoid a sudden increase in the cost of seed, and allowed the farmers to repay the cost of the seed over two years. The government bought 20 tons of corrugated iron at wholesale prices and forwarded it to Raetihi for rebuilding. In addition, the government provided £45,000 to lend to farmers to enable them to rebuild farm buildings and fences and buy more stock.

In 2018, a community event was held in Raetihi to commemorate the fire that had happened 100 years previously, and a plaque was unveiled at the cemetery there.

== See also ==
- List of fires
