= Erua railway station =

Railway station in New Zealand

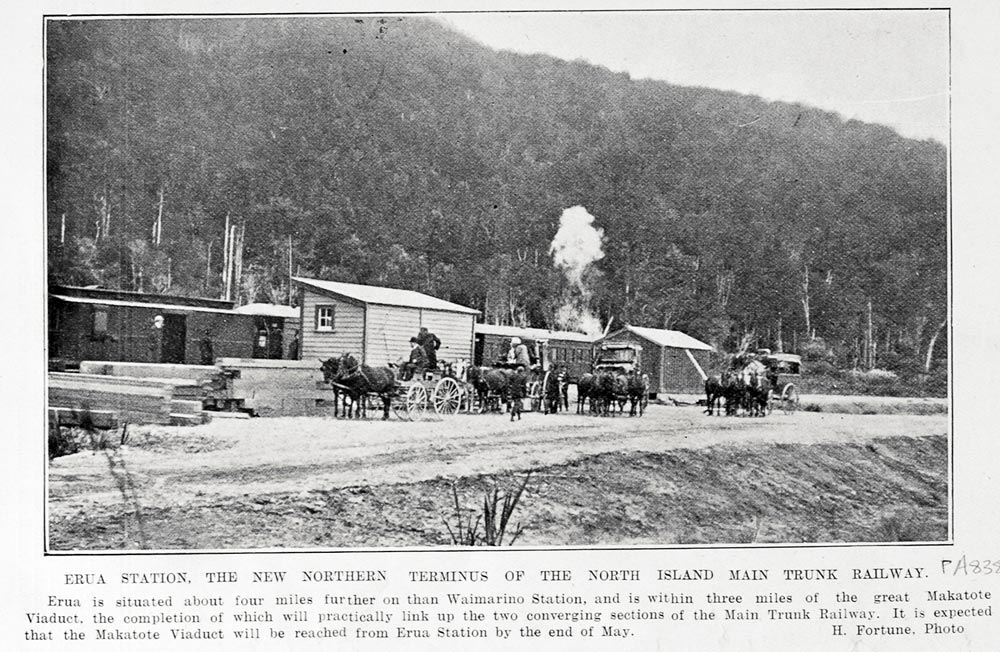
- Erua was terminus of the line in April 1908. Coaches took passengers to Ohakune to continue their rail journey

General information
- Location: Erua, New Zealand
- Coordinates: 39.227998°S 175.398703°E
- Elevation: 742 m (2,434 ft)
- Line: North Island Main Trunk
- Distance: Wellington 340.16 km (211.37 mi)

History
- Opened: 1 April 1908
- Closed: 13 September 1986
- Electrified: June 1988

Services
Preceding station	Historical railways	Following station
National Park; Line open, station open 6.67 km (4.14 mi)	North Island Main Trunk; KiwiRail	Makatote; Line open, station closed 3.29 km (2.04 mi)
Location

Erua was a station on the North Island Main Trunk line, in the Ruapehu District of New Zealand. It served the small village of Erua. For a month in 1908 it was the terminus of the line from Auckland. Makatote Viaduct and tramway are about 3 mi (4.8 km) south of Erua.

== History ==
Surveying for the route between Hīhītahi and Piriaka began in 1894. From 1 April 1908 the line from Auckland was extended from National Park to Erua. That reduced the coach journey to the southern railhead at Ohakune to 14 mi (23 km). From 1 May 1908 Erua was supplanted by Makatote as the railhead. On 9 November 1908 NZR took over from the Public Works Department the Taumarunui to Erua line and on 14 February 1909, the line south to Waiouru. Goods trains ran south from Erua from 7 January 1909. Four 5-roomed houses and a 6th class station were built in 1908, with a 23 ft (7.0 m) by 11 ft (3.4 m) shelter shed and urinals on a 200 ft (61 m) by 15 ft (4.6 m) platform, a 20 ft (6.1 m) by 30 ft (9.1 m) goods shed with verandah, a loading bank, cattle and sheep yards and a cart approach. A passing loop could take 49 wagons. Erua was described as a tablet station from 1908. There was a Post Office at the station from 1912 to 1937. Overnight, on 30 May 1921, the station burnt down. It closed to goods traffic, except in wagon lots, on 11 August 1969 and to all traffic on 13 September 1986, prior to electrification. There is now only a single line through the former station site.

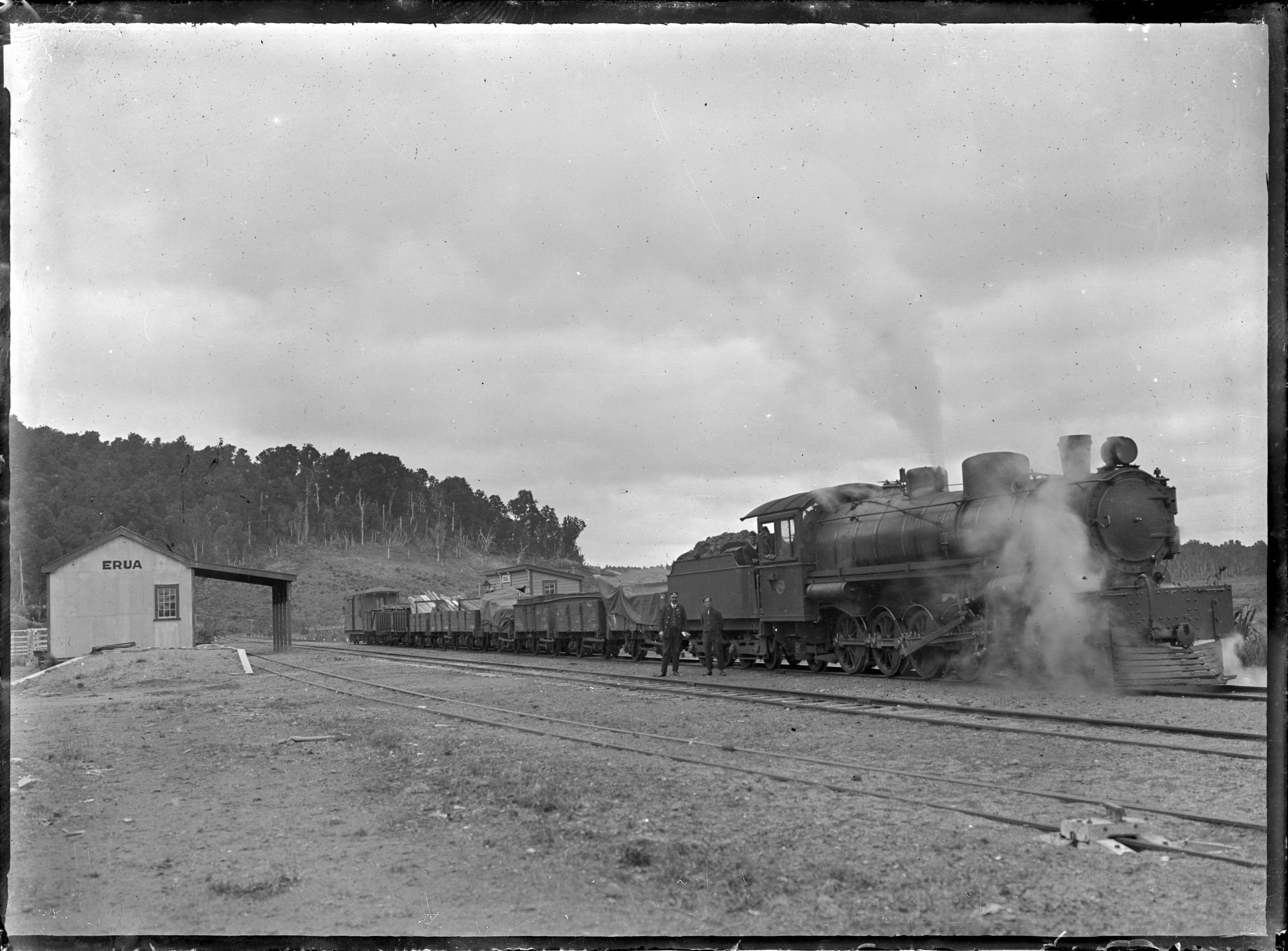
Erua between 1912 and 1916

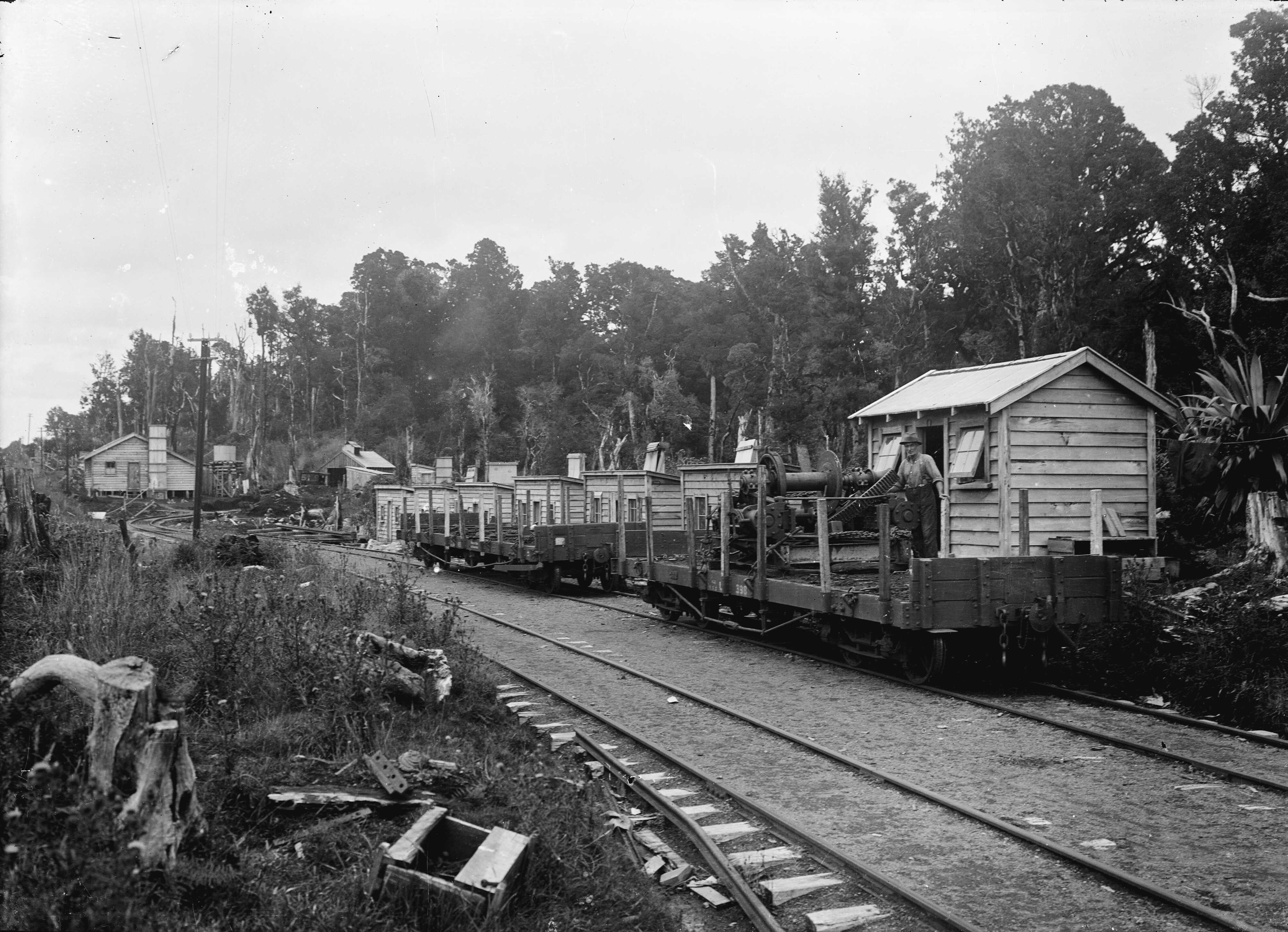
Erua station about 1920

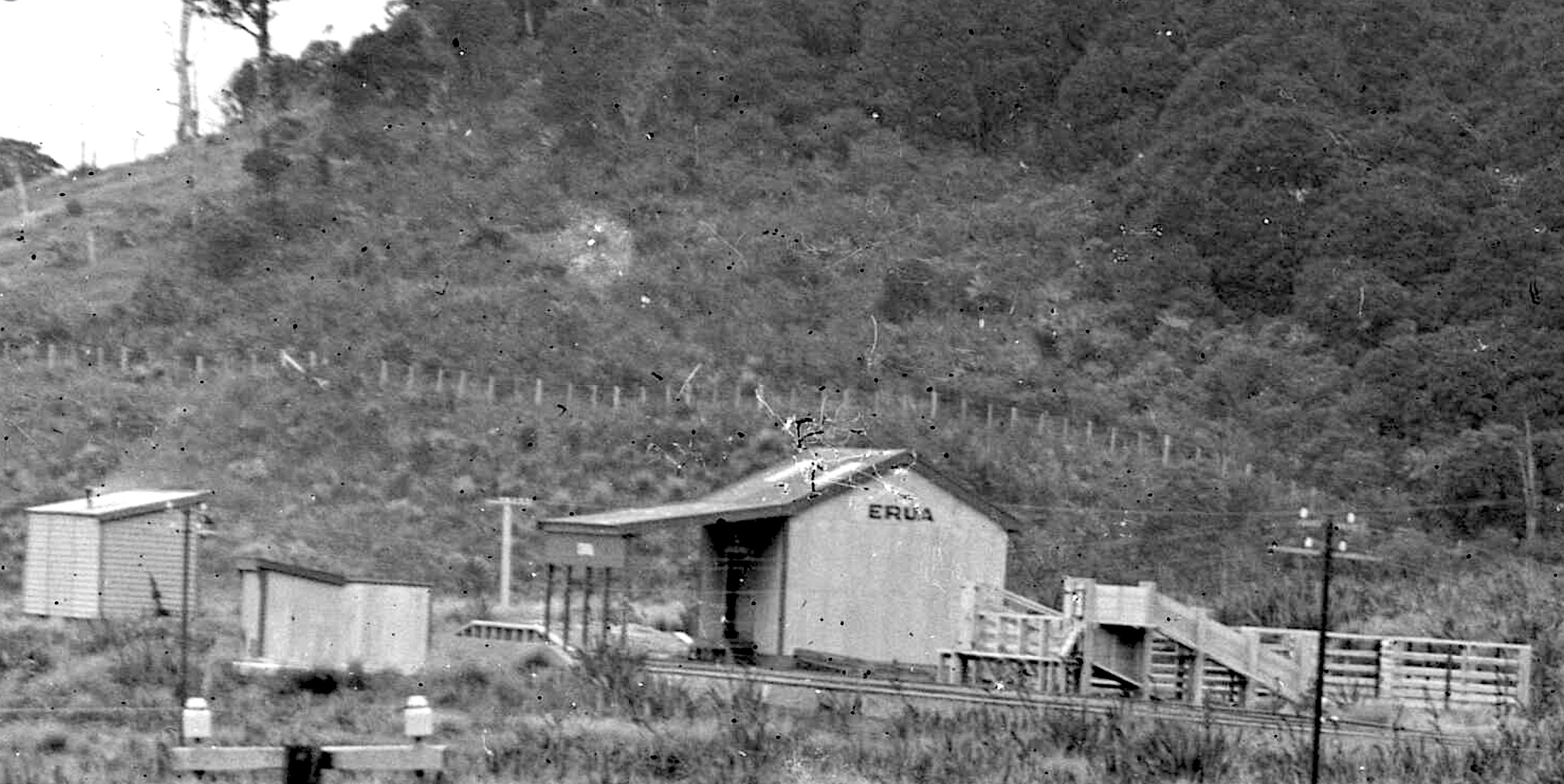
Erua between 1912 and 1916. Already most of the bush shown in the 1908 photo had gone

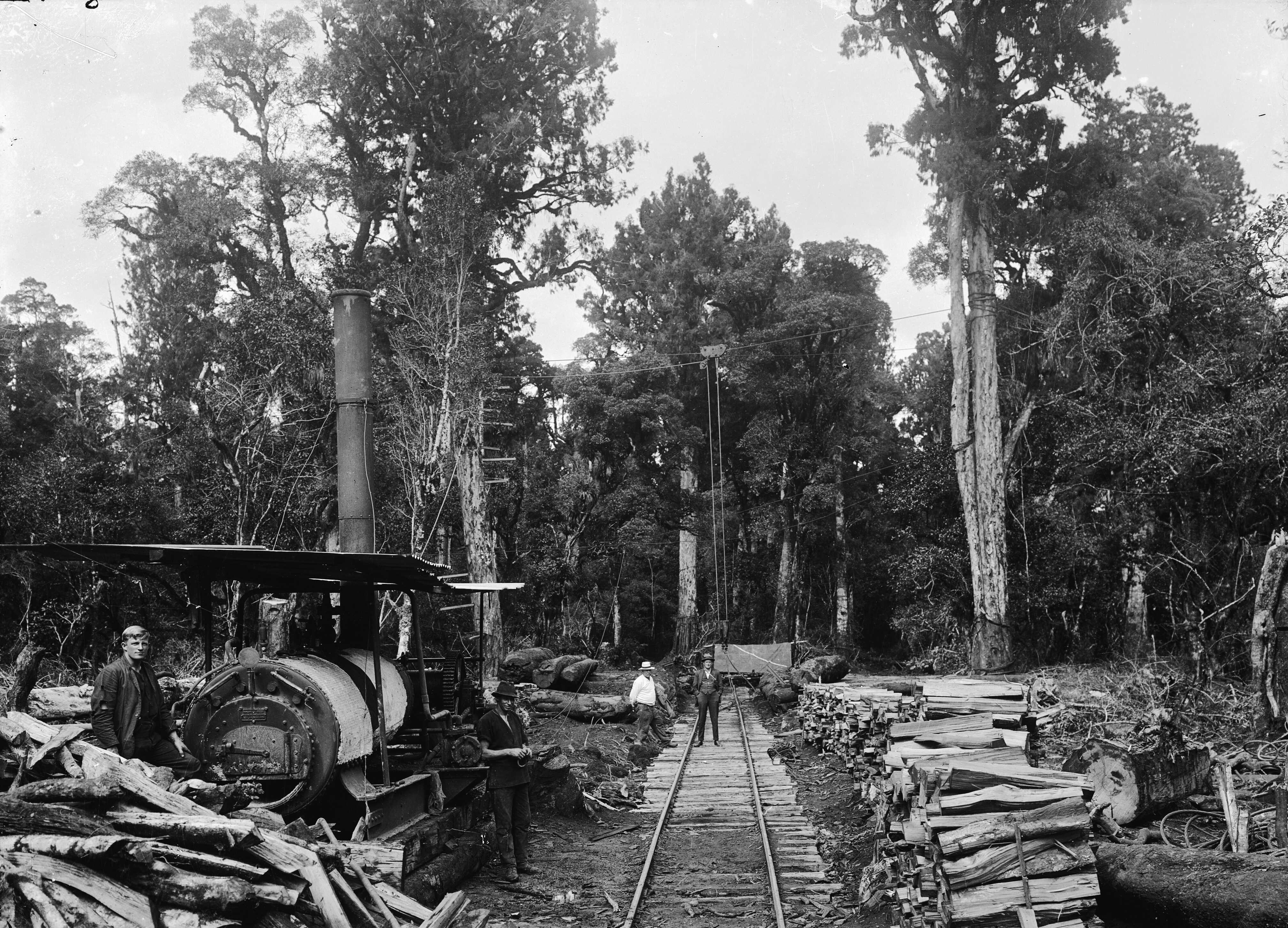
Erua bush tramway, with stacks of split logs and steam log hauler in 1920s

== Timber ==
Like the other stations along this part of NIMT, Erua had freight from several timber mills. To supply timber to the Frankton Junction Railway House Factory, a sawmill NZR opened a forestry block. 57 were working in it in 1924, though the number was reduced from 1927 and it closed in 1928. To work this block, NZR built a 4.2 km (2.6 mi) siding from Pokaka, which continued to have some use until about 1932. A tablet lock was added to Karioi Sawmill Co.'s siding between Erua and Pokako in 1930. There were several other timber companies at Erua, including Wanganui Sash and Door, whose tramway closed in December 1956. Waikune Prison had a sawmill near the station until 1927.

=== Marton Sash and Door Tramway ===
Crighton Bros had a tramway, which ran about 11 km (6.8 mi) west from the station. Some of the tramway became part of a 16 km (9.9 mi) Marton Sash and Door cycleway in 2014. The Marton mill at Erua burnt down in 1939, though it still had a tramway in 1942.
