= Horopito =

Horopito may refer to:

- Pseudowintera, commonly known as horopito, a genus of woody evergreen flowering trees and shrubs
- Horopito, New Zealand, a locality
