= Manganuioteao River =

River in New Zealand

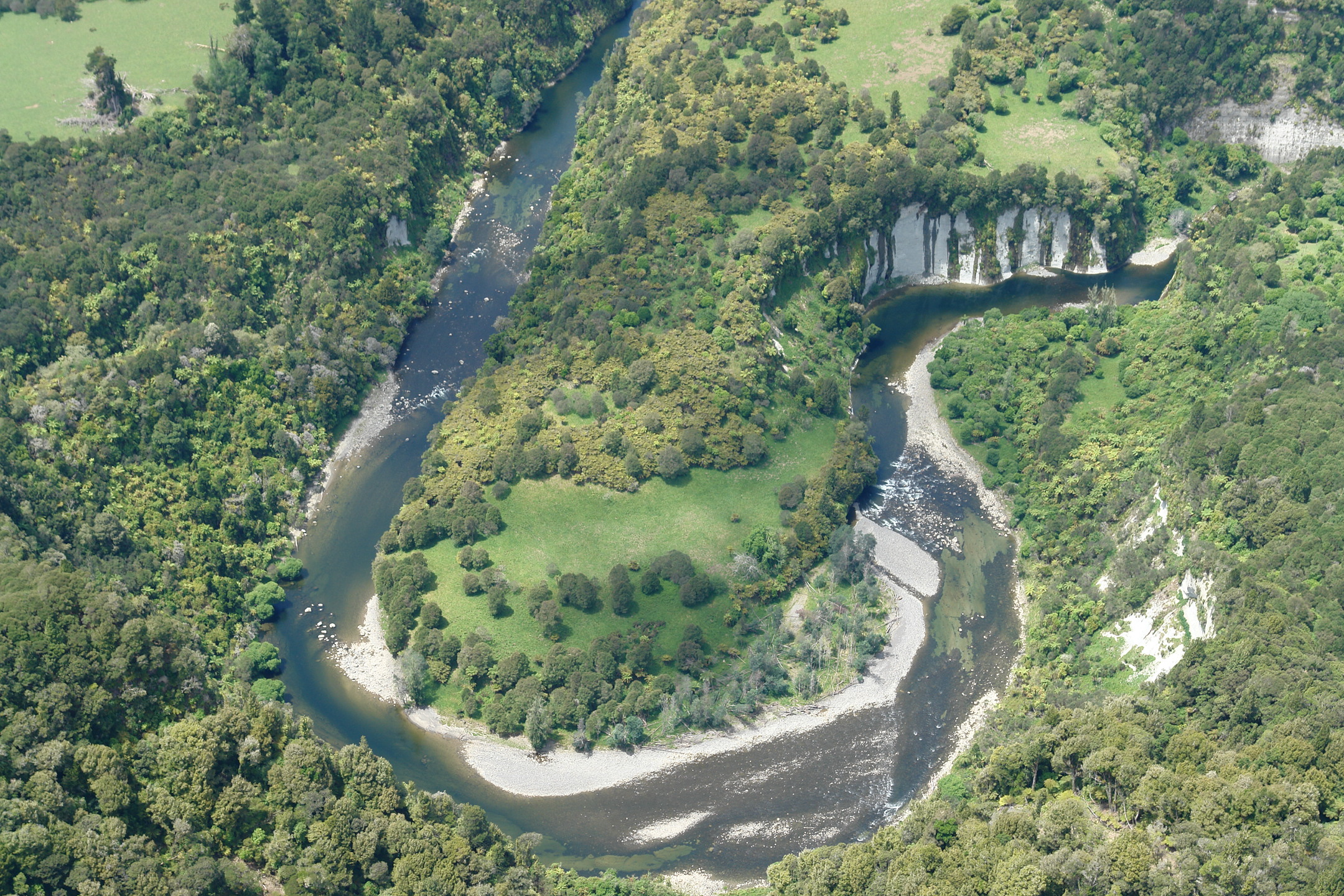
- Etymology: Māori meaning "great stream of the world"
- Native name: Manganui o te Ao (Māori)

Location
- Country: New Zealand
- Region: Manawatū-Whanganui
- District: Ruapehu
- Settlements: Orautoha

Physical characteristics
- Source: Mount Ruapehu
  - coordinates: 39°16′33″S 175°32′7″E
  - elevation: 2,000 m (6,600 ft)
- Mouth: Whanganui River
  - coordinates: 39°25′S 175°03′E
  - elevation: 62 m (203 ft)
- Length: 81 km (50 mi)

Basin features
- Progression: Manganuioteao River → Whanganui River
- River system: Whanganui River
- Tributaries
  - left: Mangaturuturu River, Orautoha Stream, Makakahi Stream, Tokitokirau Stream, Makino Stream, Huikumu Stream
  - right: Makatote River, Mangamingi Stream, Hoihenga Stream, Makino Stream, Ruatiti Stream, Ohangaia Stream, Maurikura Stream, Hurikakano Stream

The Manganuioteao River (official name since 22 August 1985, also known as Manganui o te Ao River and shown on older maps as Manganuiateau River) is a river of the centre of New Zealand's North Island. It has its source in numerous streams and small rivers which flow west from the slopes of Mount Ruapehu, though the main course of the river flows predominantly southwest through rugged hill country to meet with the Whanganui River 10 kilometres (6 mi) north of Pipiriki, at the edge of the Whanganui National Park.

The New Zealand Ministry for Culture and Heritage gives a translation of "great stream of the world" for Manganui-o-te-Ao. Other translations have been "Great river of light", or "Wide open valley with plenty of daylight".

== See also ==
- List of rivers of New Zealand

Tributary rivers

- Makatote River
- Mangaturuturu River
