= Erua, New Zealand =

Rural settlement in New Zealand

Coordinates: 39.2269°S 175.3961°E

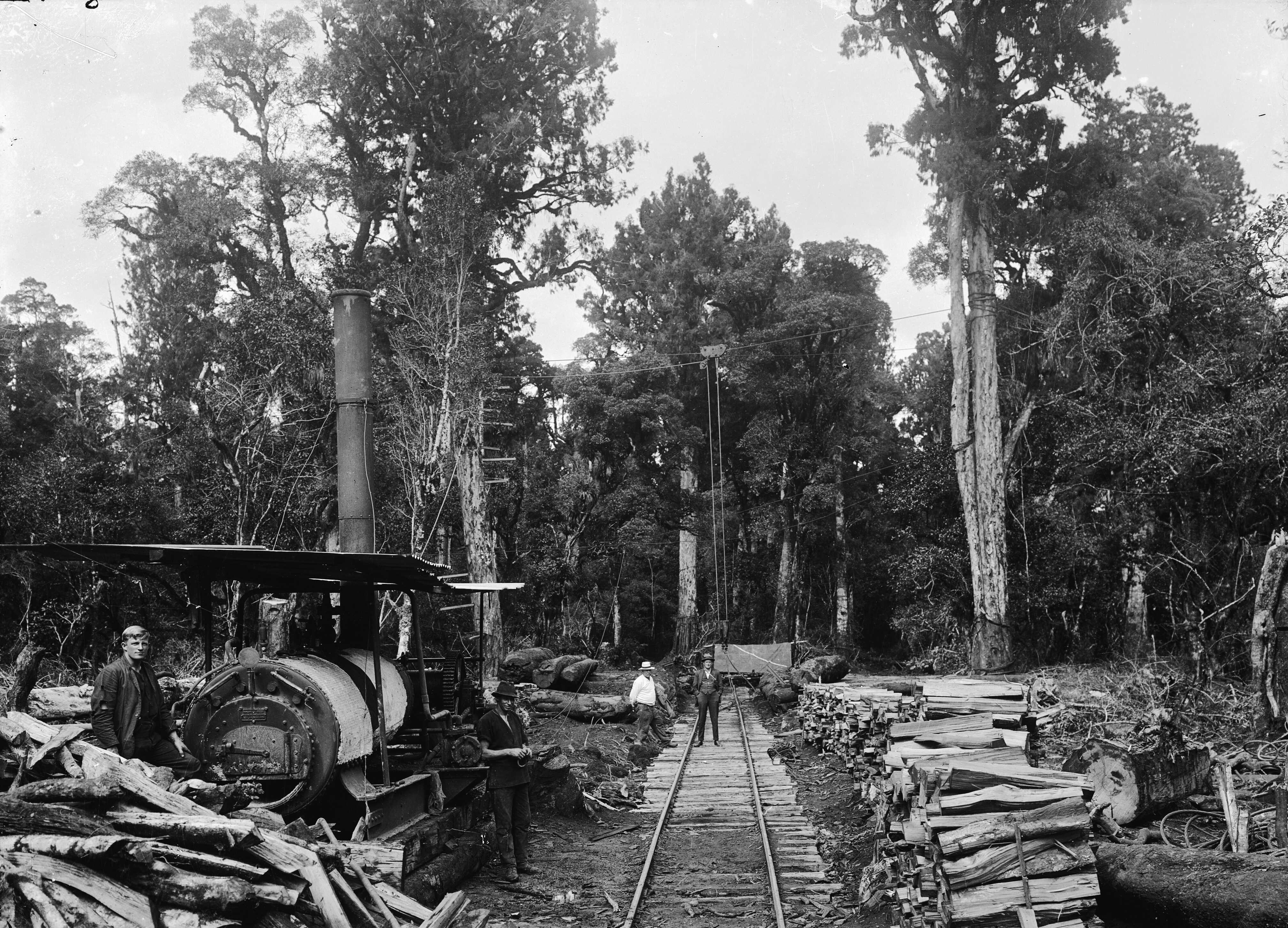
Timber, bush railway, and steam powered log hauler at Erua in 1920

Erua is a rural settlement six kilometres south of the town of National Park (now called Waimarino) on State Highway 4 in New Zealand. The area is administered by the Ruapehu District Council and is within its National Park ward.

The New Zealand Ministry for Culture and Heritage says that Erua means "two", from the Māori word "rua" for "two" and the prefix "e", which is used for numbers between two and nine.

Erua is bordered by protected forestland and is used as a base for exploring the area, which includes a singletrack bicycle trail. Pollen analysis was done on samples from the Erua Swamp. The settlement abuts Erua Forest, a 0.07 km^{2} (0.027 sq mi) area managed by the Department of Conservation and containing tawa, rimu, miro and tōtara trees. The state protected forest was established in 1930. Hunting is permitted in the forest.

== See also ==
- Mount Ruapehu
- Erua railway station
