= Makatote River =

River in New Zealand

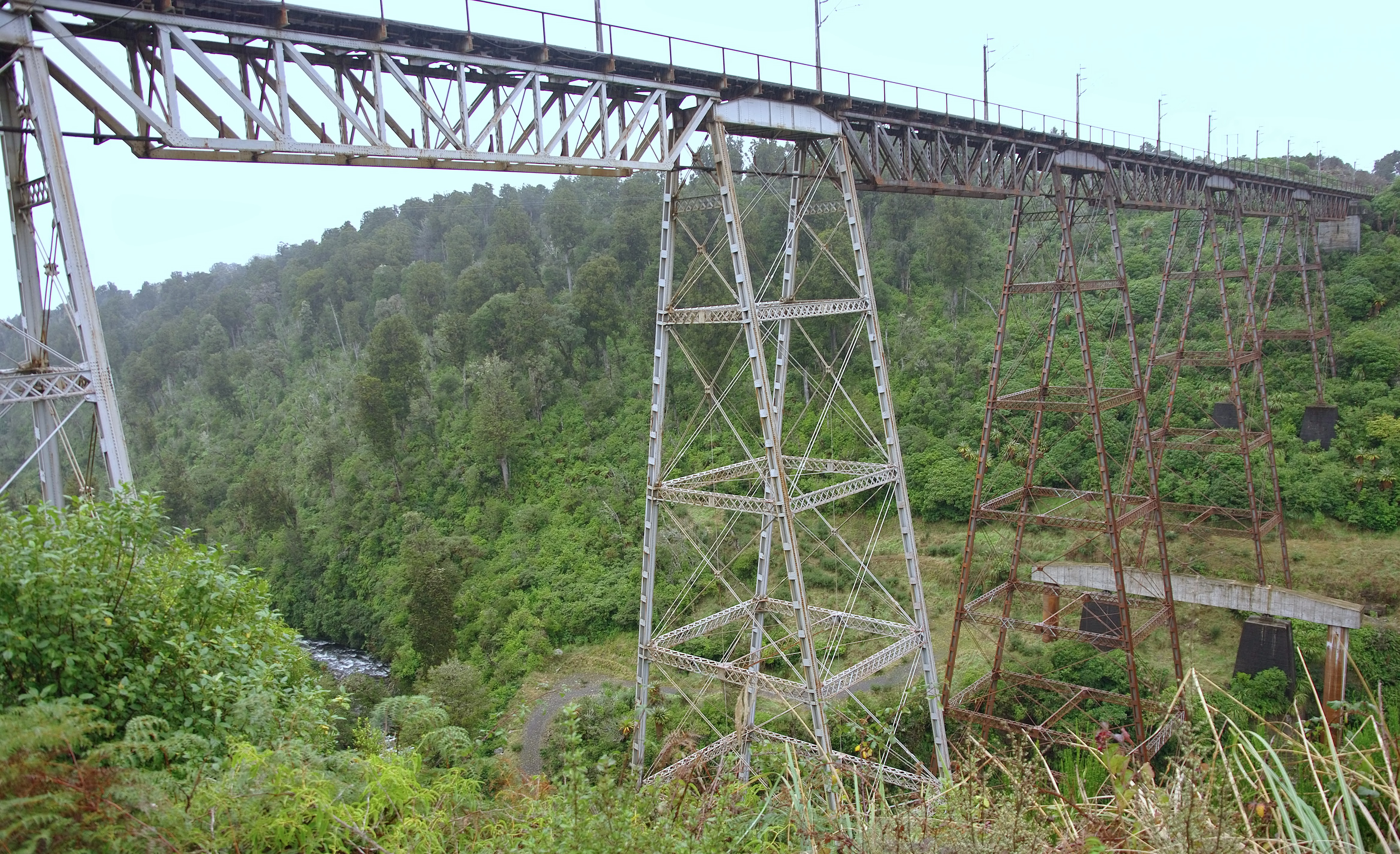
- Native name: Makatote (Māori)

Location
- Country: New Zealand
- Region: Manawatū-Whanganui
- District: Ruapehu

Physical characteristics
- Source: Mount Ruapehu
  - coordinates: 39°16′14″S 175°32′18″E
  - elevation: 2,050 metres (6,730 ft)
- Mouth: Manganui o te Ao River
  - coordinates: 39°16′23″S 175°21′4″E
  - elevation: 595 metres (1,952 ft)
- Length: 30 kilometres (19 mi)

Basin features
- Progression: Makatote River → Manganui o te Ao River → Whanganui River
- River system: Whanganui River
- Bridges: Makatote Viaduct

The Makatote River is a river of the centre of New Zealand's North Island. It flows west from the slopes of Mount Ruapehu, and from the Hauhungatahi Wilderness Area, before entering rough hill country, veering southwest and entering a gorge cut almost 100 m (330 ft) into the volcanic rocks. It joins with the waters of several smaller streams to become the Manganui o te Ao River, part of the Whanganui River system.

The river is part of a water conservation order catchment to protect indigenous fish including lamprey, longfinned eel, short-finned eel, common smelt, banded kōkopu, short-jawed kokopu, koaro, torrentfish, redfinned bully, common bully, and Cran's bully. Trees in the gorge include rimu, matai and maire. The main trees logged were rimu, mataī, kahikatea, tōtara and miro. The lowest 3 km (1.9 mi) of the river is monitored for its whio population. A proposal to create a track to Te Kohatu waterfall was rejected as being inappropriate for a wilderness area.

The river is spanned by the third largest railway viaduct in the country, which is 79 m (259 ft) high. SH4 (originally built by the railway for access to its construction sites) crosses on a much lower bridge near the viaduct.

Just to the north of the viaduct, the Makatote Tramway has a Category 2 listing by the New Zealand Historic Places Trust, with remnants of rails, skid sites, a log hauler, water pits and bogie wheels. In the 1930s Western Red Cedar and Lawson's Cypress were planted near the tramway by the State Forests Service as part of a wider experimental high-altitude planting programme. Japanese Cedar, Douglas Fir, Ponderous Pine, Weymouth Pine and Sugar Pine were also considered for the experiment.

== See also ==
- List of rivers of New Zealand
