= Peter Seton Hay =

New Zealand civil engineer

Peter Seton Hay (1852–19 March 1907) was a New Zealand civil engineer and public servant. He was born in Glasgow, Lanarkshire, Scotland on 12 July 1852.

He was brought to Dunedin in April 1860. In 1875, he joined the Public Works Department, as an engineering cadet, and was awarded a University of Otago BA in 1877 and an MA in 1878. He married Mary Clarke on 22 April 1879. They had four sons and a daughter.

Peter Seton Hay helped build parts of the Main South Line, Central Otago, Midland and Catlins River railways, before moving to the Wellington head office in 1884. His works then included Timaru Harbour, the NIMT (with the Makōhine, Mangaweka, Hapuawhenua, Taonui, Manganui-a-te-ao and Makatote viaducts), Awatere bridge; Farewell Spit Lighthouse, Rakaia Gorge Bridge, Christchurch Exhibition towers, Motueka Harbour and reports on the hydroelectric potential of the Waikato, Waikaremoana, Mangawhero–Wanganui and Lakes Coleridge, Hāwea, Te Anau and Manapouri.

In 1906 he was promoted to engineer-in-chief, but died the next year, aged 54, of pleurisy, after several months in hospital, following exposure whilst inspecting the railway near Waiouru.
