= Makatote Tramway =

Bush tramway network in New Zealand

Coordinates: 39.2563°S 175.3937°E

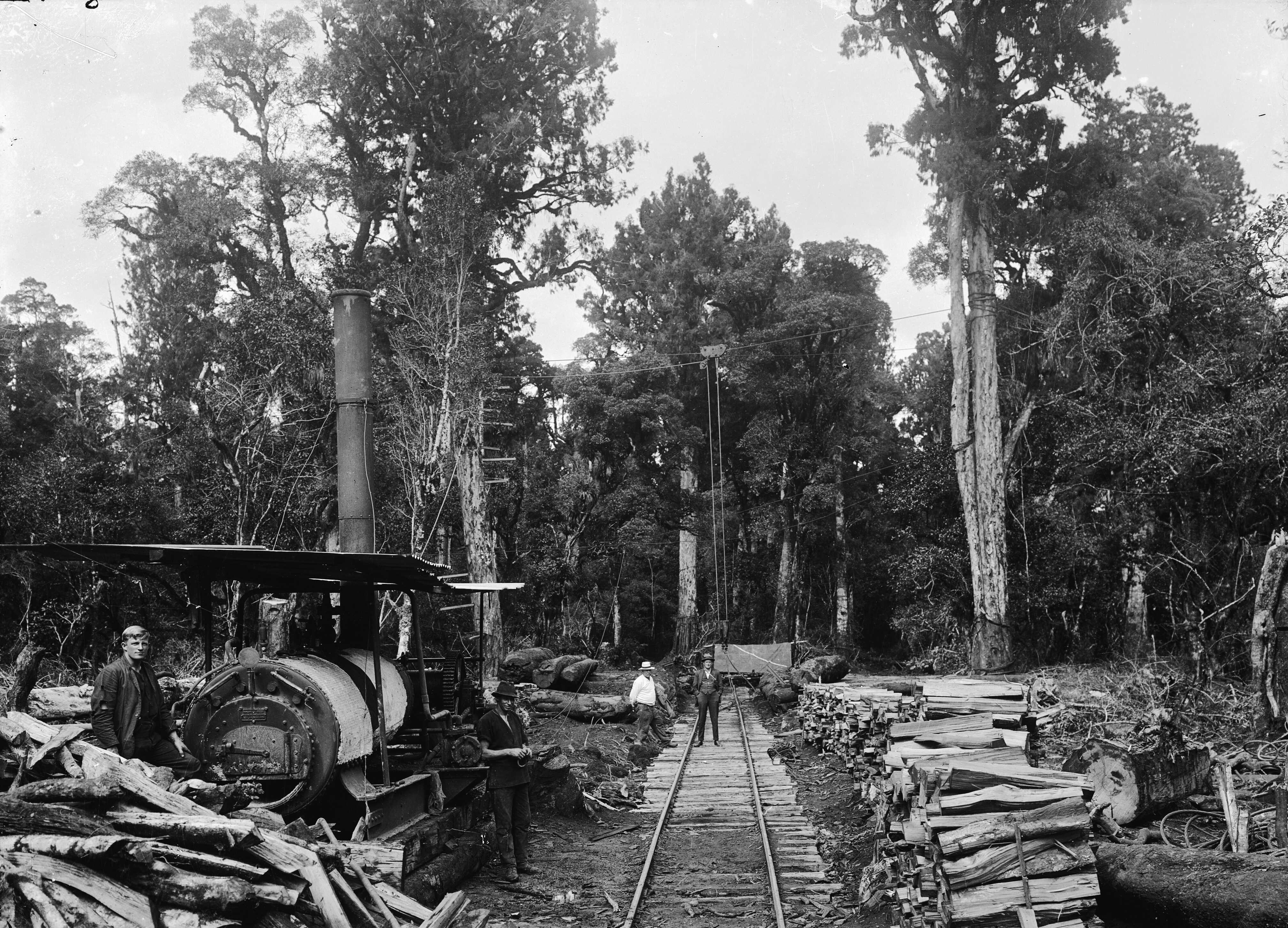
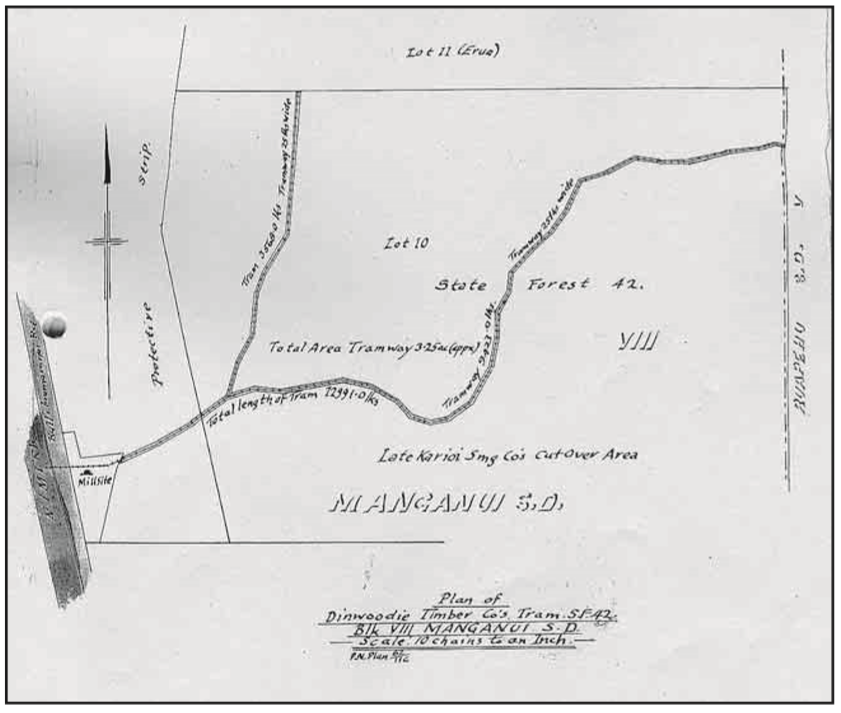
- Bush railway line and steam log hauler Plan of Dinwoodie Timber Co's Tram S.F.42, Blk VIII Manganui S.D, 24 September 1935

Technical
- Line length: Approx. 1 km (0.6 mi) + 1.6 km (1 mi)
- Track gauge: 4 feet 1 inch (1,245 mm)

The Makatote Tramway was from the late 1920s to 1940 a 2.6 kilometres (1.6 mi) long bush tramway network near Makatote in the central North island of New Zealand with a gauge of 4 feet 1 inch (1,245 mm) using metal and wooden rails. It was operated by Dinwoodie's Timber Company with probably less than 10 employees.

== Route ==
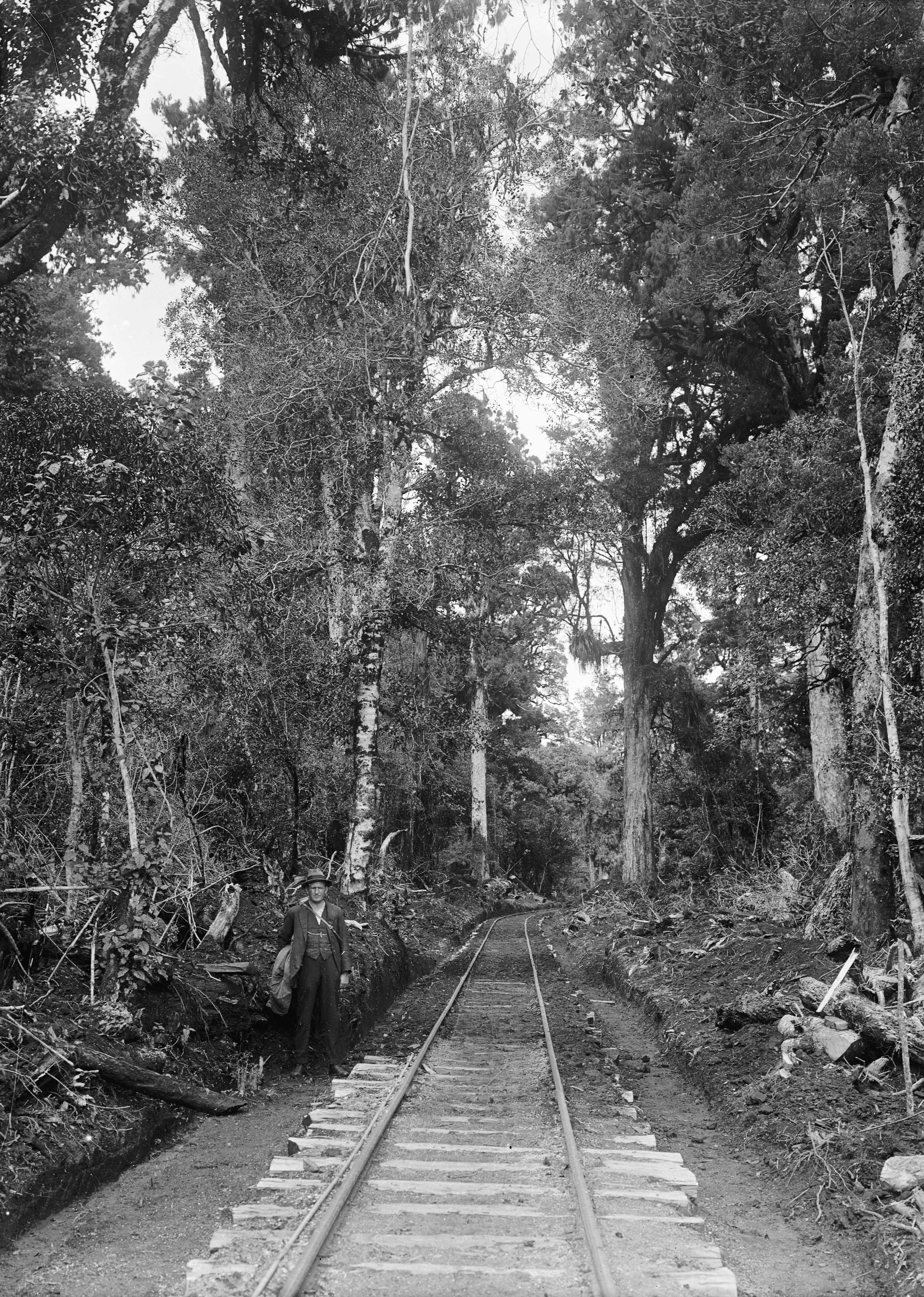
Bush railway line

The Makatote Tramway lies east of State Highway 4 approximately 10 kilometres (6.2 mi) south of the village National Park, New Zealand on the western boundary of the Tongariro National Park. The track consisted of two main branches of tramlines extending in easterly and northeasterly direction. Both wooden and metal rails can still be found throughout the site. Several pits and water races were installed to serve the steam-powered log haulers and to meet the fire safety requirements of the tramway license.

=== Main Branch ===
Only a small number of sleepers and rails of the Main Branch are still in situ today, but the route can be clearly distinguished. The wooden tramway of the Main Branch was constructed from approximately 3 by 6 inches (76 mm × 152 mm) tōtara rails, laid onto rough-sawn logs of various diameters. The rails were attached to the wooden sleepers by large metal spikes, some of are still in place along the tramway. The sleepers are spaced 4 feet (1,219 mm) apart and the gauge of the rails is approximately 4 feet 1 inch (1,245 mm) similar to the Wellington tramway system. A bogey wheel is also still on site near the main branch, shortly before a junction where it splits into the Left-hand and Right-hand Branches.

=== Left-hand Branch ===
The Left-hand Branch runs from the Main Branch Junction northwards and has several side branches to the east and west. The second side branch to the west is particularly interesting because of its preserved rails, bearers and sleepers, and even a points change. It runs towards a skid site and log hauler, which is embossed with the name S. Luke and Co Ltd, Wellington, one of the 13 principal log hauler manufacturers in New Zealand. The log hauler has a significant fatigue crack in the side, which was crudely repaired on site, but subsequently taken out of service. The Left-hand Branch then splits into two branches at the former boundary between Lots 10 and 11. The Left Left-hand Branch has more in situ sleepers, rails and bearers than the Left-hand Branch, and has two skid sites, a causeway and a bridge crossing. The Right Left-hand Branch runs from the junction towards east. It crossed two bridges and consisted mainly of intermittent sections of corduroy roads, but there is a small length of wooden tramway at the very end of the branch, which lead to a skid site and associated draglines. There is also a junction partway along the Right Left-hand Branch with a branch in northerly direction.

=== Right-hand Branch ===
The Right-Hand Branch runs eastwards up a slight incline from the junction, where exotic trees have since been planted on either side of the track. It then runs north-eastwards towards a skid serving some draglines. It is partially overgrown, but continuous lengths of wooden rail, including a section of double tramline, are present, and there are metal rails further along the branch. There were also several bridges and side branches with skid sites and draglines, including two to the south that crossed the stream. Recorded artefacts include numerous bogey wheels.

== Licences ==
The tramway license allowed the Dinwoodie Timber Company Limited "to occupy the land specified in the Schedule hereto as a tramway route for the purpose of using and maintaining a tram-line and running a tram thereon," An attached plan showed the extent of the existing tramway, which crossed the Bulls–Taumarunui Road (now State Highway 4) to join the North Island Main Trunk railway. The license did not allow for any other use of the land such as felling of trees for maintenance of the tramline, this was to be assessed and charged for. The Forest Service reserved a 15 chains (300 m) strip of native bush along the road for scenic purposes, when it sold the licence for timber harvesting. Dinwoodie was required to provide free carriage of young trees and materials for replanting for the New Zealand Forest Service, when unloaded trolleys were returning to the bush. The State Forests Service planted Western Red Cedar and Lawson's Cypress along the tramway in the 1930s as part of an experimental high-altitude planting programme. They cannot be harvested without damaging the historical and archaeological remains of the tramway and are now slowly being overgrown by native vegetation.

== Liquidation ==
Thomas Dinwoodie closed down his milling operations in 1940. The Dinwoodie Timber Company's assets put on the market in a liquidation sale held on the site on 17 January 1941. Perham Larsen and Co belonging to the Carter group, considered exploiting the area, but declined due to economic considerations.

== Historic Place Category 2 ==
The route of the track north of the Makatote River, the structures and features relating to the sawmilling operations, including skid sites, a log hauler, water pits, bogie wheels and a range of metal artefacts are listed as Historic Place Category 2. The site also includes four affiliated house sites on clearings in the bush extending southerly to the area where State Highway 4 winds downwards into the Makatote gully.

== See also ==
nearby Makatote Viaduct

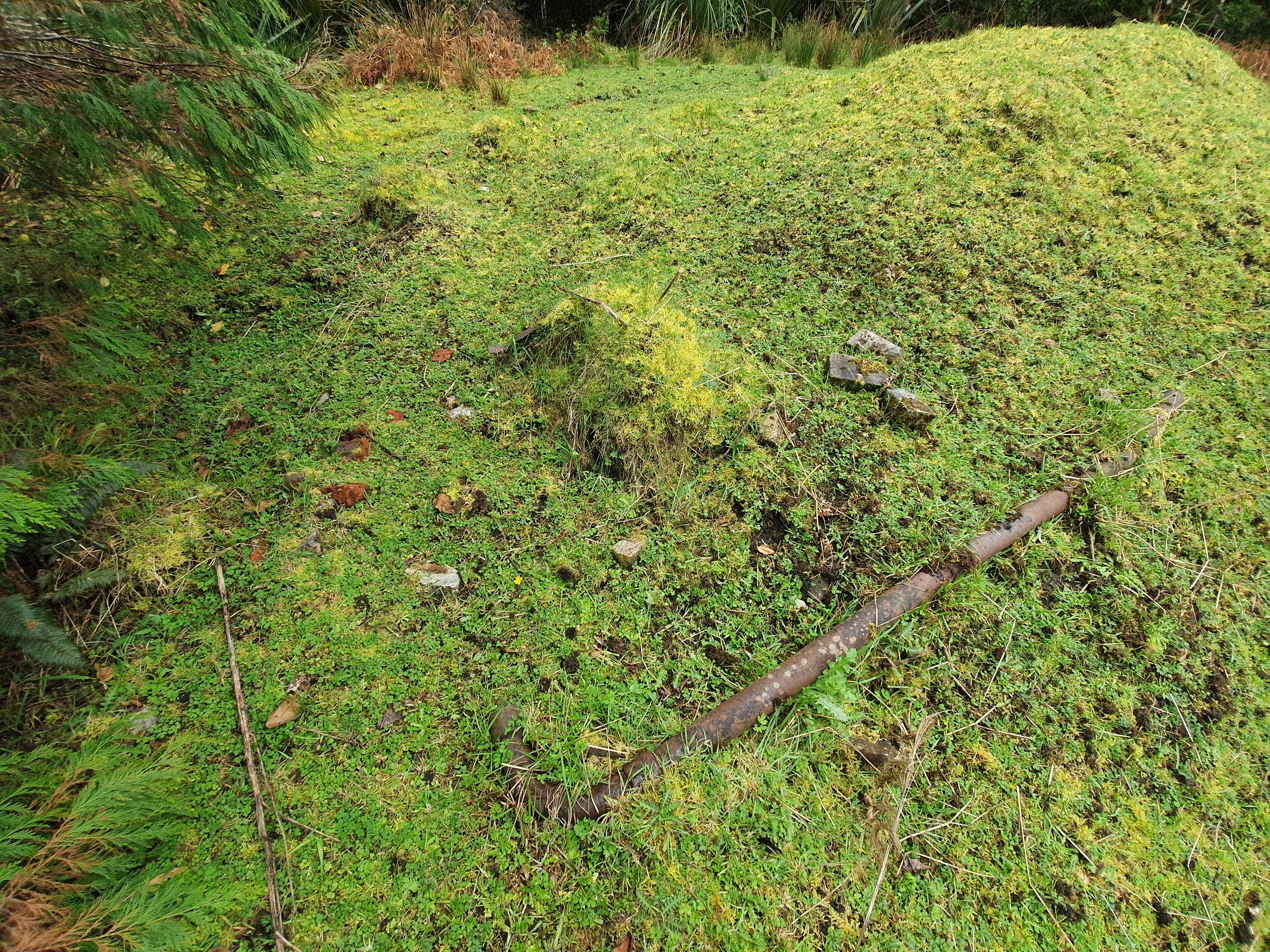
Overgrown collapsed buildings photographed in 2020
