= Mangaturuturu River =

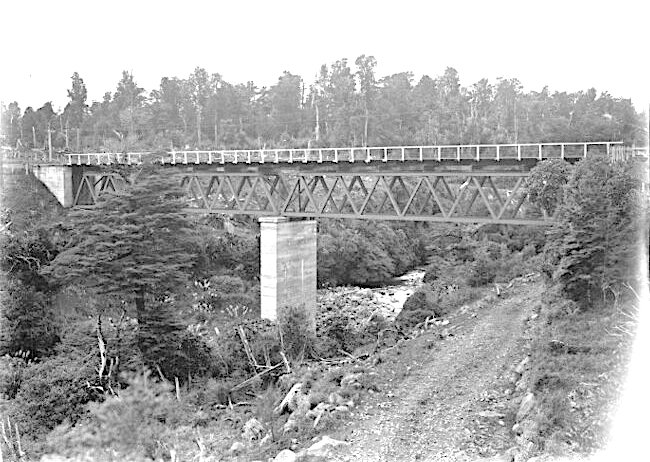
- Railway viaduct over the Mangaturuturu River
- Etymology: Māori meaning "leaky stream"
- Nickname: Sulphur River
- Native name: Mangaturuturu (Māori)

Location
- Country: New Zealand
- Region: Manawatū-Whanganui
- District: Ruapehu

Physical characteristics
- Source: Mangaturuturu Glacier
  - location: Mount Ruapehu
  - coordinates: 39°16′55″S 175°32′50″E
  - elevation: 2,200 metres (7,200 ft)
- Mouth: Manganui o te Ao River
  - coordinates: 39°19′20″S 175°16′12″E
  - elevation: 490 metres (1,610 ft)
- Length: 29 kilometres (18 mi)

Basin features
- Progression: Mangaturuturu River → Manganui o te Ao River → Whanganui River
- River system: Whanganui River

The Mangaturuturu River is a river at the centre of New Zealand's North Island. One of the headwaters of the Manganui o te Ao River, it flows west from the slopes of Mount Ruapehu, joining with numerous other small rivers to become the Manganui o Te Ao 20 kilometres (12 mi) northwest of Ohakune. It has also been known as Sulphur River, or Sulphur Creek. In April 1975 a lahar raised the river to 2.1 m (6 ft 11 in) above its flood level. There were also lahars in 1969 and September 1995. Earlier lahars were around 8,500 and 10,500 years ago.

== See also ==
- List of rivers of New Zealand
