= Makatote Viaduct =

Viaduct in New Zealand

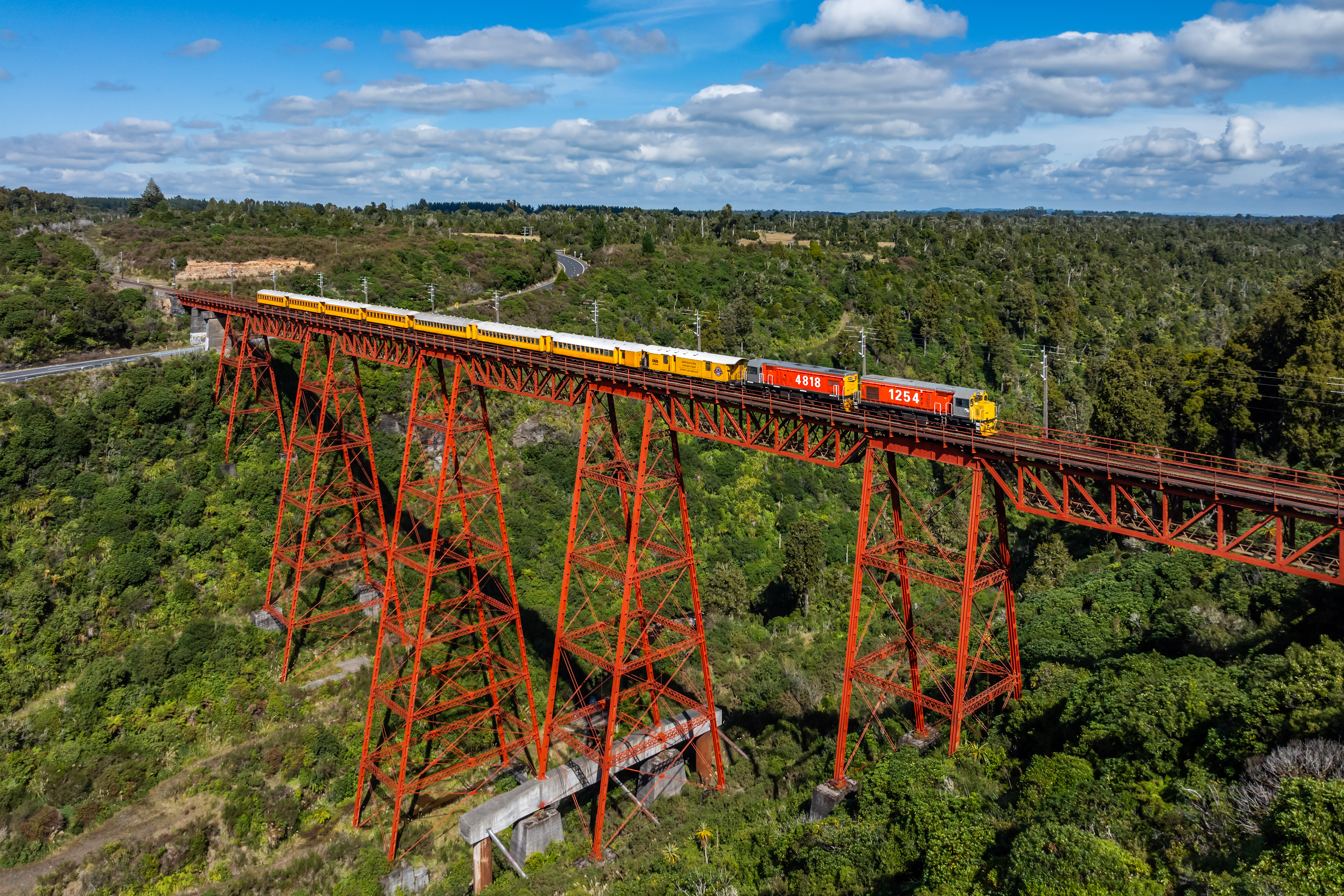
- Makatote Viaduct in April 2026
- Coordinates: 39.2658°S 175.3899°E
- Carries: Single track of the North Island Main Trunk
- Crosses: Makatote River
- Owner: KiwiRail

Characteristics
- Design: Plate girder and Pratt truss
- Material: Mild steel
- Total length: 262 metres (860 ft)
- Height: 79 metres (259 ft)
- No. of spans: 10

History
- Engineering design by: PWD
- Constructed by: J. & A. Anderson & Co
- Construction start: 1905
- Construction end: 10 July 1908
- Opened: 6 November 1908

Heritage New Zealand – Category 2
- Designated: 20 February 2009
- Reference no.: 7778

Location
- Interactive map of Makatote Viaduct

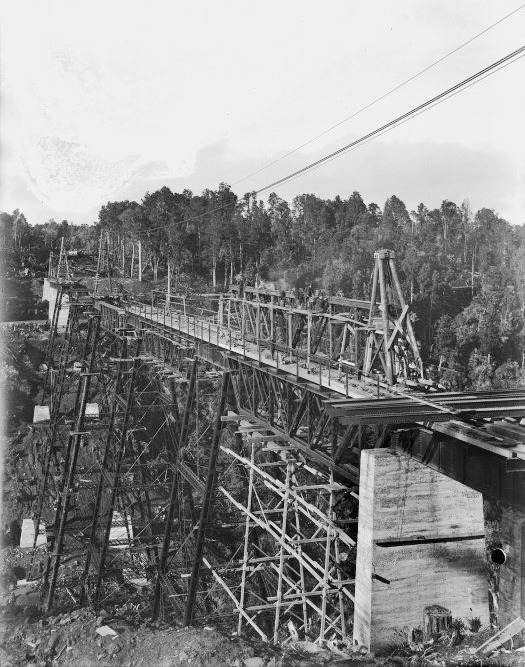
Railway viaduct at Makatote under construction in 1908

The Makatote Viaduct (Bridge 179) takes the North Island Main Trunk railway (NIMT) across the Makatote River in New Zealand. It is 335.7 km (208.6 mi) from Wellington, at the foot of Ruapehu, in northern Manawatū-Whanganui (central North Island), between Erua and Pokaka.

It was built between 1905 and 1908 for the Public Works Department (PWD), who passed it to New Zealand Railways Department (NZR) in 1909.

When built it was tallest (and is now the third-tallest) viaduct in New Zealand, the higher ones being the 1981 North Rangitikei at 81 metres (266 ft), further south on the NIMT, and 1937 Mohaka Viaduct at 95 metres (312 ft), on the Gisborne line.

== Design and construction ==
Like most of the other NIMT viaducts, Makatote was designed by Peter Seton Hay, later PWD Engineer-in-Chief. Spans 1, 2, 3, 9 and 10 are steel plate girders, spans 4-8 are steel Pratt trusses each 30.5 m (100 ft) long. Piers 1, 2, 3, 9, 10 and 11 are of reinforced concrete with piers 4 to 8 being steel trestles on reinforced concrete footings. Pier 6 is the highest.

Tenders were called on 15 May 1905. Christchurch firm, J. & A. Anderson & Co, won the bid a month later. The viaduct was estimated to cost £43,132, but the final cost was said to be £53,369 ($8.6m at 2016 prices) in 1908, though £56,251 was shown in a 1912 parliamentary paper. Two years were stipulated to complete the contract, but there were problems with foundations, weather, floods, shortage of cement in 1907 and "want of sufficient suitable men".

Equipment, materials and stores seem to have been shipped by two routes. Some went to Whanganui and were barged up the Whanganui River to Pipiriki, then by bullock or horse teams, and later traction engine, to Makatote. Later, some went via Auckland, then by train to Oio (open by early 1906), and along a new access road (now SH4). As the railhead crept south, the road haul reduced; Raurimu by 10 May 1907, Erua on 1 April 1908.

Rather than transport girders from their base in Lyttelton, on 25 June 1906, Andersons opened a large foundry, (285 ft (87 m) x 30 ft (9.1 m)), or 35 ft (11 m), to fabricate the steel on site. It was powered by a wood-burning boiler and steam engine, with electric lights and machines. Electric overhead travelling cranes and a cableway (or Blondin) eased on-site transport. A water turbine drove the stone crusher and concrete mixer (adverts from the period said they used 9,000 bags of Portland Cement). A telephone link to Ohakune was built in 1906.

The last girder was placed on 4 June 1908, following which the cableway was dismantled to allow earthworks and track laying to be completed on 3 August 1908.

Check rails prevented a derailed tender falling off the viaduct in 1949.

== Maintenance and upgrades ==
Although designed for 84 ton locos, 94 ton X Class were built for opening the line. Strengthening of all NIMT bridges from 1925 to 1932 allowed axle loads up to 14 tons and 135 ton K and 145 ton Ka classes. Further work from 1983 to 1989 added brackets on the west of the viaduct for electrification masts and strengthening for 105 ton EF Class electrics, with 18 tonne axle loads and higher tractive forces.

River erosion caused problems for the foundations either side of it. Pier 6 was underpinned in 1981-82 with two new 1.8 m (5.9 ft) cylinders and prestressed concrete caps. Caps were also added to Piers 3 and 9, which were also vertically prestressed.

On the other side, Pier 7 was threatened. During the privatisation period repairs were minimal, so that, although the risk was being monitored, nothing was done. When ONTRACK took over in 2004, it assessed Makatote as its highest structural risk, since much of it could collapse, especially if there was an earthquake. In 1906 Pier 7 had been found to have a "rotten foundation" and so had a deeper footing.

Fulton Hogan began $4.2 m of reinforcing work in April 2006 to prop up Pier 7's footings with about 100m^{3} of concrete, 2 m (6.6 ft) steel cased concrete piles down to 12 m (39 ft) below the river and ground anchors. Piezometers monitored that the work didn't cause further weakening and trains limited to 40 km/h (25 mph) to minimise movement of some trusses. The work was completed on schedule at the end of February 2007, despite having to cope with a spring, heavy rain, snow and winds.

The viaduct was given Category 1 listing by the New Zealand Historic Places Trust in 2009.

Paint applied in 1959 and partially repainted in 1997, was showing signs of flaking off, so a $13m project started in 2014 to blast off 7 tons of lead paint, using about 200 tons of garnet, strengthen and replace some steel sections and apply an oxide paint to the 12,000 m^{2} (14,000 yd^{2}) of the viaduct.This was completed in October 2016. Access was by two 4 ton pier access gantries and used 330 tons (or 272 tons) of scaffolding hanging below the bridge.

In both 2007 and 2014 efforts were made to protect the rainbow and brown trout and a family of whio nesting very close to the viaduct. In 2007 silt traps were built and work scheduled to minimise disruption during the spring breeding season. From 2014 the viaduct was progressively shrink-wrapped (see time lapse video) as the leaded paint was removed and the residue vacuumed to a storage site about 100 m (330 ft) south of the bridge. Weekly checks of the river were also made and KiwiRail funded rat and stoat trapping along the banks of the river until 2019.

== Station ==
Makatote railway station
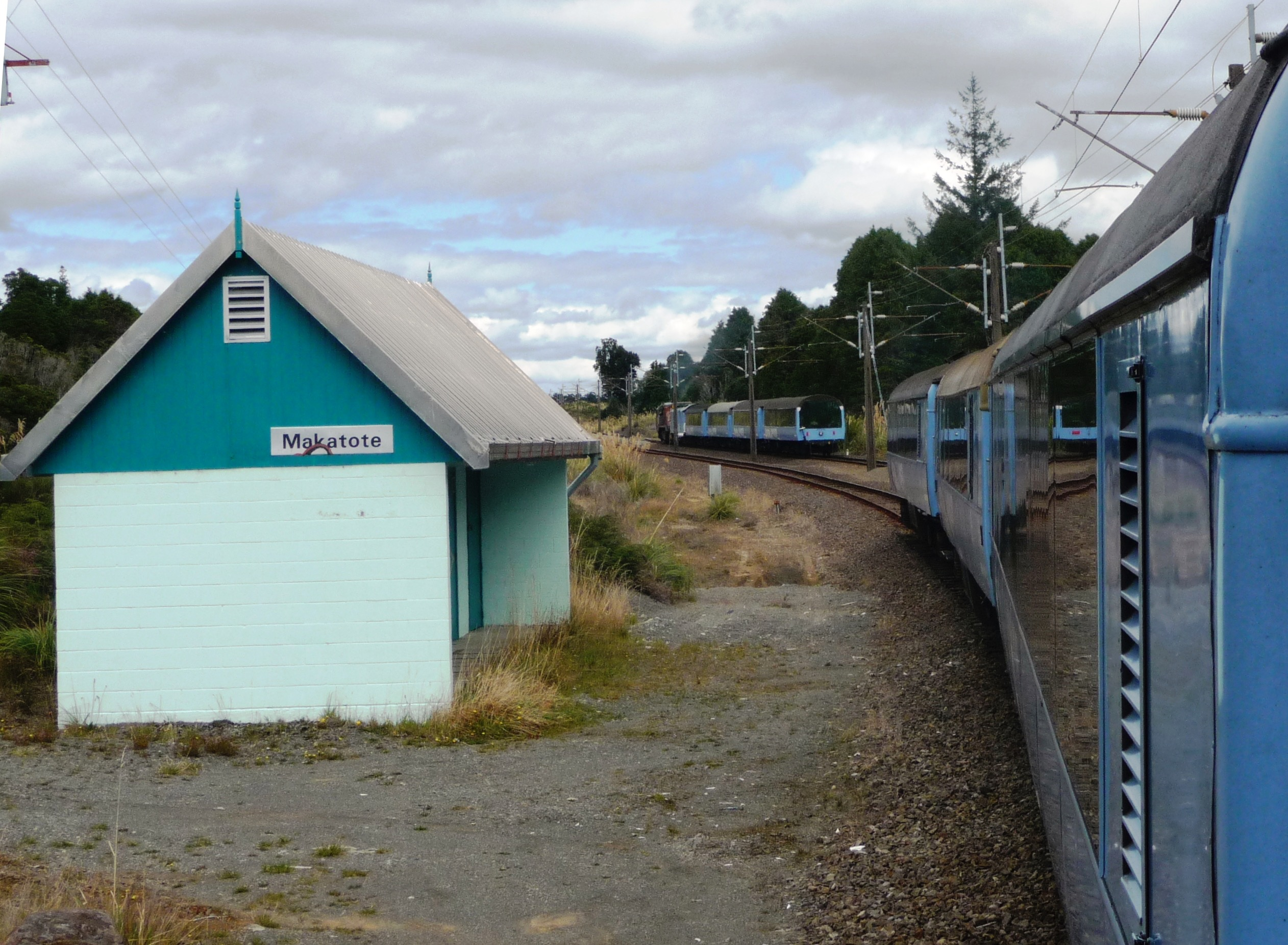
- Overlander trains passing in 2009

General information
- Location: New Zealand
- Coordinates: 39°15′18″S 175°23′15″E
- Elevation: 790 m (2,590 ft)
- Line: North Island Main Trunk
- Distance: Wellington 336.87 km (209.32 mi)

History
- Opened: 1 May 1908
- Closed: 4 January 1909
- Rebuilt: 13 September 1986
- Electrified: 24 June 1988

Services
Preceding station	Historical railways	Following station
Erua railway station Line open, station open 3.29 km (2.04 mi)	North Island Main Trunk; KiwiRail	Pokaka; Line open, station closed 4.1 km (2.5 mi)
Location

During construction the camp operated as a lunch stop for passengers on the coach between the temporary railheads at Ohakune and Raurimu.

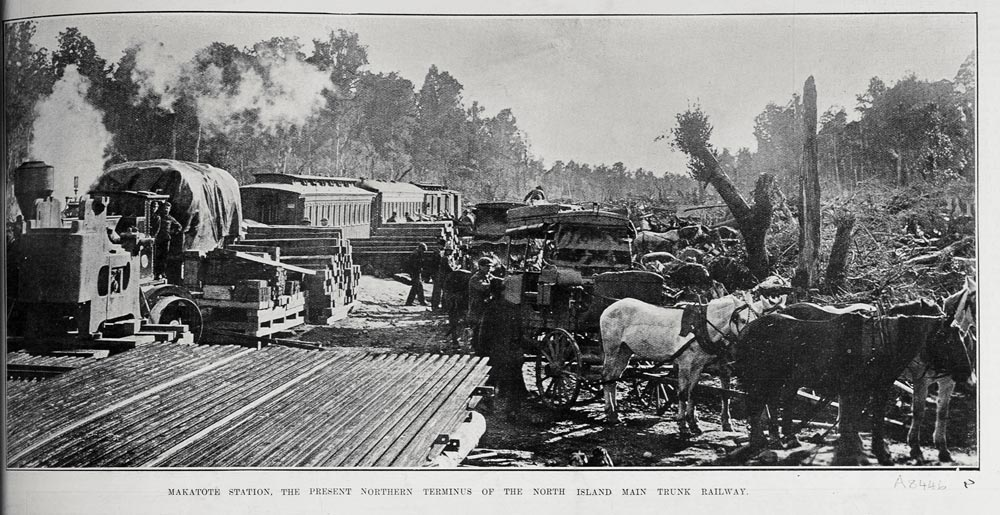
1908 temporary terminus - transfer to coaches to Ohakune

A station, 2 mi 35.38 ch (3.930 km) south of Erua and north of the viaduct, operated by PWD, opened on 1 May 1908 The second-class fare from Auckland to Wellington, including the 9 mi (14 km), 2½hr journey by coach between Makatote and Ohakune, was £1 17s 2d (2016 equivalent $300). Mail was transferred between the railheads at Makatote and Horopito from 22 August 1907 and the station was open for goods from 11 May 1908. Makatote closed on 4 January 1909, 5 months after the through line was opened and shortly before it was handed over to NZR.

On 13 September 1986, shortly before electrification, a new passing loop opened at Makatote, about 600 m (0.37 mi) north of the original station.

== See also ==
Makatote Tramway
