= Horopito, New Zealand =

Coordinates: 39°21′S 175°23′E

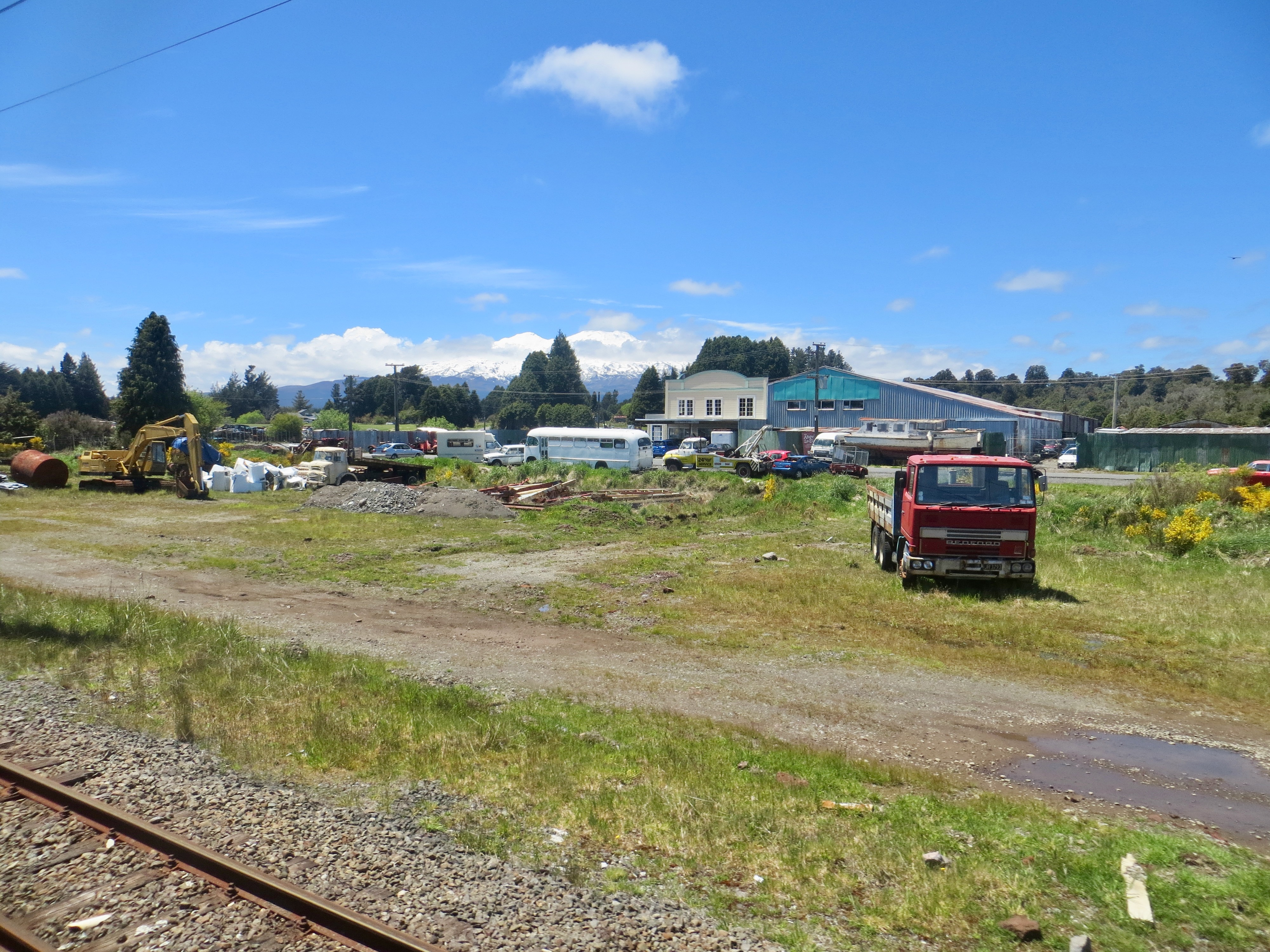
Horopito scrap yard in 2012

Horopito is a locality in the North Island of New Zealand. It lies on State Highway 4 between the village of National Park and the town of Raetihi.

In the early days Horopito was a bustling sawmilling town. It had a railway station (1907-1986), school, two hotels, a bank, a strip club, post office and numerous houses. In 1907 a former Liberal MP, Kennedy Macdonald, had the impression that Hamilton, Horopito, Waiouru, Marton, and Palmerston North would be the chief places along the North Island Main Trunk line and was advertised as, "The future mercantile and industrial centre between Auckland and Wellington". In the 1920/30s Horopito fell into decline, as people left for better work opportunities. Today nothing remains of most of the buildings. The hub of Horopito is the car wrecker business Horopito Motors, which has been the scene of several movies, including Smash Palace and Goodbye Pork Pie.

The 2014 Cold Kiwi Motorcycle Rally was held at Horopito.
