= Mount Huxley (New Zealand) =

Mountain in New Zealand

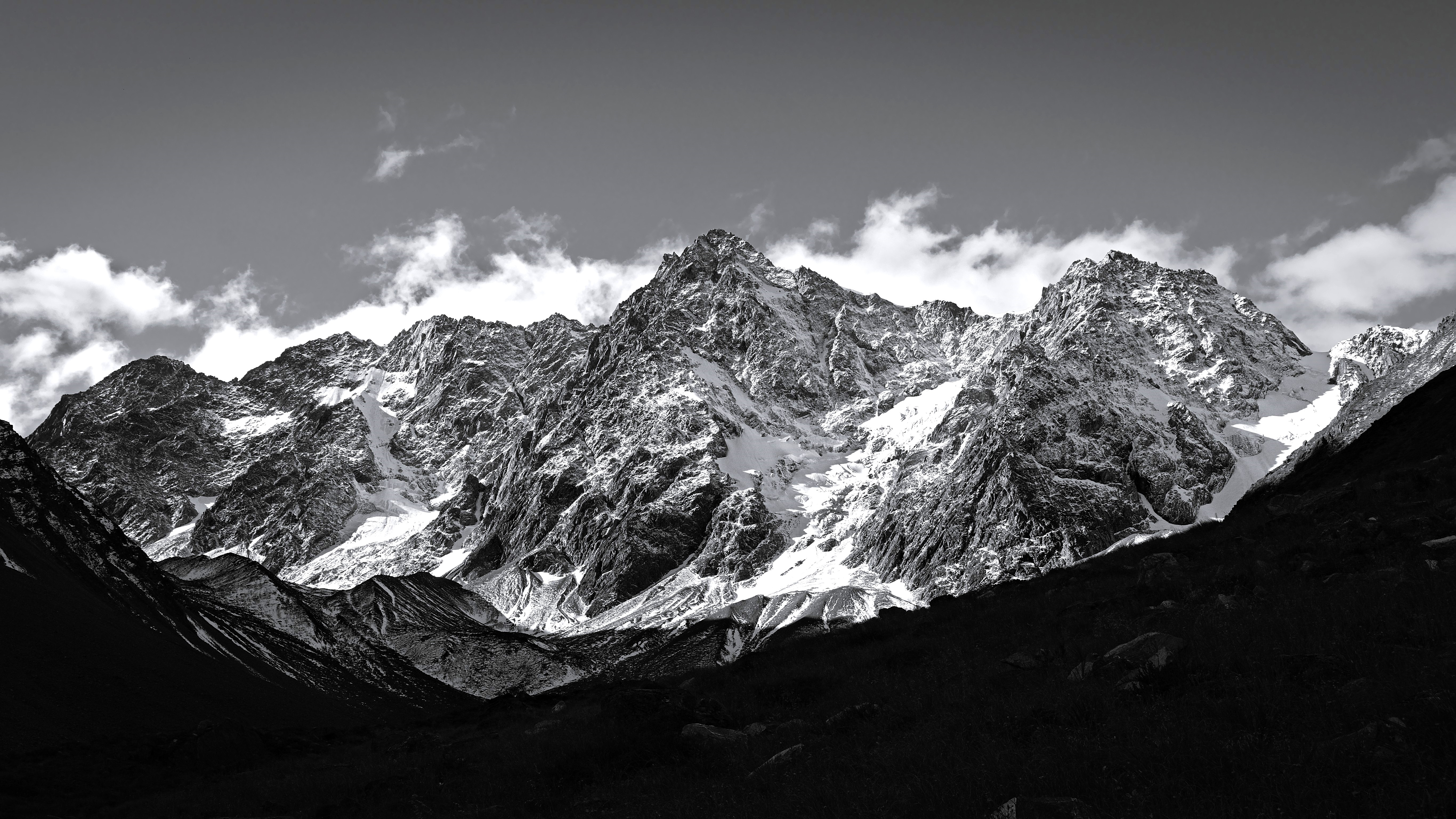
- South face

Highest point
- Elevation: 2,505 m (8,219 ft)
- Prominence: 873 m (2,864 ft)
- Isolation: 18.29 km (11.36 mi)
- Listing: Highest mountains of New Zealand
- Coordinates: 44°04′15″S 169°40′43″E

Naming
- Etymology: Thomas Henry Huxley

Geography
- Location within New Zealand
- Interactive map of Mount Huxley
- Location: South Island
- Country: New Zealand
- Region: Canterbury / Otago
- Protected area: Ahuriri Conservation Park; Hāwea Conservation Park
- Parent range: Southern Alps; Huxley Range
- Topo map: Topo50 BZ14

Climbing
- First ascent: 1939

Mount Huxley is a 2,505-metre-elevation (8,219-foot) mountain in New Zealand.

== Description ==
Mount Huxley is the highest peak in the Huxley Range of the Southern Alps. It is situated on the boundary shared by the Otago and Canterbury Regions of South Island. This peak is located 40 kilometres (25 mi) northwest of the town of Twizel and is set on the boundary shared by Hāwea Conservation Park and Ahuriri Conservation Park. Precipitation runoff from the mountain drains south into the headwaters of the Ahuriri River, northwest to the Hunter River, and northeast to the Huxley River. Topographic relief is significant as the south face rises 1,000 metres (3,281 feet) in one kilometre, and the summit rises 2,000 metres (6,562 feet) above the Hunter Valley in five kilometres. The nearest higher peak is Mount Brewster, 18 kilometres to the west. Mount Huxley was named by Julius von Haast to honour Thomas Henry Huxley (1825–1895), an English biologist and anthropologist.

== Climbing ==
Climbing routes with first ascents:

- North East Face – Scott Gilkison, Roland Rodda, Harry Stevenson, Rod Williams, Max Willis – (1939)
- North East Ramp – Peter Barker, John Chivers, Bob Cunningham – (1959)
- North East Ridge – Lloyd Beech, Brian McGlinchy, Bill Stephenson, Stephen Thompson – (1976)
- South Ramp – Eric Feasy, Syd Woods – (1979)
- Vein – Al Uren, Phil Penney, Glen Einam – (1990)
- ANZAC – Nick Brown, Don French, Rob McBrearty, Brian Smith – (1991)
- South Face – John Graham, Nicholas Shearer – (1993)
- 42nd Street – Peter Dickson, Bill McLeod – (1993)
- West Face – James Edwards, Sam Barron – (2005)
- Hey I ordered a cheeseburger – Paul Hersey, Dannie Baillie – (2007)
- Oma Rāpeti – Steven Fortune, Kieran Parsons – (2016)
- East Slope – FA unknown

== Climate ==
Based on the Köppen climate classification, Mount Huxley is located in a marine west coast (Cfb) climate zone, with a subpolar oceanic climate (Cfc) at the summit. Prevailing westerly winds blow moist air from the Tasman Sea onto the mountains, where the air is forced upward by the mountains (orographic lift), causing moisture to drop in the form of rain or snow. This climate supports a small glacier on the east slope of Huxley. The months of December through February offer the most favourable weather for viewing or climbing this peak.

== See also ==
- List of mountains of New Zealand by height
