= Pastoral lease =

Lease of Crown land from the government for farming

A pastoral lease, sometimes called a pastoral run, is an arrangement used in both Australia and New Zealand where government-owned Crown land is leased out to graziers for the purpose of livestock grazing on rangelands.

== Australia ==
=== Historical background ===
In the Australian states and territories, leases constitute a land apportionment system created in the mid-19th century to facilitate the orderly division and sale of land to European colonists. Legislation ensured that certain Aboriginal rights were embodied in pastoral leases. However, according to historian Henry Reynolds, several colonial leaders ran roughshod over these rights, including Sir John Downer (when the Northern Territory was governed by the colonial government of South Australia); Sir John Forrest in the colony of Western Australia; and Sir Samuel Griffith in Queensland.

=== Today ===
Pastoral leases exist in both Australian commonwealth law and state jurisdictions. They do not give all the rights that attach to freehold land: there are usually conditions which include a time period and the type of activity permitted. According to Austrade, such leases cover about 44% of mainland Australia (3,380,000 km^{2} (1,310,000 sq mi)), mostly in arid and semi-arid regions and the tropical savannahs. They usually allow people to use the land for grazing traditional livestock, but more recently have been also used for non-traditional livestock (such as kangaroos or camels), tourism and other activities. Management of the leases falls mainly to state and territory governments. Leases within state jurisdictions have variations as to applicability from state to state.

Under Commonwealth of Australia law, applicable only in the Northern Territory, they are agreements that allow for the use of Crown land by farmers.

Native title can co-exist with pastoral leases, and Indigenous land use agreements may be made between the leaseholder and the affected native title group.

==== Relevant legislation and management ====
Australian jurisdictions have land management legislation that affects the administration of pastoral leases. As of November 2023 the legislation and management arrangements are as follows:

- New South Wales - Western Lands Act 1901
- Northern Territory – Pastoral Land Act 1992 and Crown Lands Act 1992
- Queensland – Land Act 1994
- South Australia – Pastoral Land Management and Conservation Act 1989 (323 pastoral leases, covering more than 40 per cent of the state)
- Western Australia – Land Administration Act 1997

== New Zealand ==
The statutory provisions of pastoral leases are covered by the New Zealand Crown Pastoral Land Act 1998 and the Land Act 1948. The holder of the lease has:

- the exclusive right of pasturage
- a perpetual right of renewal of the lease for terms of 33 years
- no right to the soil, and
- no right to acquire the fee simple of any of the land.

== See also ==
- Cattle station
- Sheep station
- List of pastoral leases in Western Australia
- List of pastoral leases in the Northern Territory
