= Tenure review =

Tenure review or post-tenure review may refer to:

- Review of an academic tenure
- Tenure review in the South Island, reviewing the leasehold tenure of land in the South Island of New Zealand
