= List of statutes of New Zealand (1990–1999) =

This is a partial list of statutes of New Zealand for the period of the Fourth National Government of New Zealand up to and including part of the first year of the Fifth Labour Government of New Zealand.

== 1990s ==
=== 1991 ===
- Animal Control Products Limited Act
- Building Act Amended: 1992/93/96/2002/03/05
- Business Development Boards Act Amended: 1996/97
- Child Support Act Amended: 1992/93/94/96/97/98/99/2001/03/05/06
- Crown Minerals Act Amended: 1991/93/96/97/2003/04
- Driftnet Prohibition Act Amended: 2000
- Electoral Referendum Act
- Employment Contracts Act Amended: 1991
- Foreshore and Seabed Endowment Revesting Act Amended: 1994/99
- Harbour Boards Dry Land Endowment Revesting Act
- Invercargill Reserves Vesting and Empowering Act
- Kumeu District Agricultural and Horticultural Society Act
- Legal Services Act Amended: 1992/94/95/97/2001/03/06/07
- Marlborough District Council Empowering Act
- Ministry of Maori Development Act
- New Zealand Permanent Trustees Limited Act
- New Zealand Planning Council Dissolution Act
- New Zealand Tourism Board Act
- Orakei Act
- Privacy Commissioner Act
- Proceeds of Crime Act Amended: 1992/2002
- Resource Management Act 1991 Amended: 1993/94/96/97/2003/04/05/07
- Sugar Loaf Islands Marie Protected Area Act

Plus 113 acts amended and two acts repealed.

=== 1992 ===
- Accident Rehabilitation and Compensation Insurance Act Amended: 1992/93/95/96/97/98
- Crown Research Institutes Act
- Energy Companies Act Amended: 1992/93
- Health and Safety in Employment Act Amended: 1993/98/2002/04/06
- Housing Restructuring Act
- Industry Training Act Amended: 1993/2002/03
- Lake Pukaki Water Level Empowering Act
- Measurement Standards Act
- Mines Rescue Trust Act
- Museum of New Zealand Te Papa Tongarewa Act Amended: 1996
- Mutual Assistance in Criminal Matters Act Amended: 1994/96/98/99/2001/02
- National War Memorial Act
- New Zealand Export-Import Corporation Dissolution Act
- Northland Regional Council and Far North District Council Vesting and Empowering Act
- Otago Foundation Trust Board Act Amended: 1968/86
- Railway Safety and Corridor Management Act
- Selwyn Plantation Board Empowering Act
- Ship Registration Act Amended: 1999/2005
- Southland Flood Relief Committee Empowering Act
- Student Loan Scheme Act Amended: 1993/95/96/97/98/99/2000/03/05/07

Plus 105 acts amended and three acts repealed.

=== 1993 ===
- Air Facilitation Act
- Animal Identification Act Amended: 1999
- Biosecurity Act Amended: 1993/94/96/97/99/2003/04/05/07
- Birdlings Flat Land Titles Act
- Cancer Registry Act
- Canterbury Area Health Board Reserves and Other Lands Empowering Act
- Citizens Initiated Referenda Act Amended: 1994/95
- Companies Reregistration Act Amended: 1994/97/98
- Consumer Guarantees Act Amended: 1999/2003
- Earthquake Commission Act Amended: 1998
- Estate Duty Abolition Act
- Films, Videos, and Publications Classification Act Amended: 1997/98/99/2005/07
- Financial Reporting Act Amended: 1994/96/97/2001/04/06
- Health and Disability Services Act Amended: 1995/98
- Housing Assets Transfer Act
- Human Rights Act Amended: 1994/99/2001/04/07
- Land Transport Act Amended: 1995/97/2004/05/06/07
- Maritime Transport Act Amended: 1996/98/99/2000/04/05
- Ngati Rarua-Atiawa Iwi Trust Empowering Act
- Privacy Act Amended: 1993/94/96/97/98/2000/02/03/05/06/07
- Receiverships Act Amended: 1994/2001/05
- Retirement Income Act
- Southland Electricity Act
- Takeovers Act Amended: 2001/02/06
- Te Ture Whenua Maori Maori Land Act

Plus 106 acts amended and one act repealed.

=== 1994 ===
- Arts Council of New Zealand Toi Aotearoa Act
- Clevedon Agricultural and Pastoral Association Empowering Act
- Countrywide Banking Corporation Limited Act
- Fiscal Responsibility Act Amended: 1998
- Geographical Indications Act Amended: 1996
- Health and Disability Commissioner Act Amended: 2003/07
- Income Tax 001 Act
- Income Tax 002 Act
- Insurance Intermediaries Act
- Layout Designs Act Amended: 1999
- National Bank of New Zealand Limited Act
- New Zealand Sports Drug Agency Act Amended: 2000
- Tax Administration Act Amended: 1995/96/97/2005/06
- Taxation Review Authorities Act Amended: 1996
- Veterinarians Act

Plus 137 acts amended and four acts repealed.

=== 1995 ===
- Births, Deaths, and Marriages Registration Act Amended: 1997/2000/01/02/03
- Chatham Islands Council Act Amended: 2002/04
- Domestic Violence Act Amended: 1998/2003
- International War Crimes Tribunals Act
- Radio New Zealand Act Amended: 2004
- St Kentigern Trust Act
- Waikato Raupatu Claims Settlement Act

Plus 75 acts amended and one act repealed.

=== 1996 ===
- Auckland War Memorial Museum Act
- Customs and Excise Act Amended: 1996/98/2000/01/02/04/06/07
- Dog Control Act Amended: 2003/04/06
- Financial Transactions Reporting Act Amended: 1998/99
- Hazardous Substances and New Organisms Act Amended: 1999/2000/03/07
- Inspector-General of Intelligence and Security Act
- Institute of Chartered Accountants of New Zealand Act
- Intelligence and Security Committee Act
- New Zealand Antarctic Institute Act
- Te Runanga o Ngai Tahu Act
- United Nations Convention on the Law of the Sea Act

Plus 129 acts amended and one act repealed.

=== 1997 ===
- Agricultural Compounds and Veterinary Medicines Act Amended: 1998/99/2000/02/03/07
- Compulsory Retirement Savings Scheme Referendum Act
- Credit (Repossession) Act 1997
- Finance Act
- Harassment Act
- Meat Board Act Amended: 2006
- Trans-Tasman Mutual Recognition Act
- Waitutu Block Settlement Act
- Wool Board Act

Plus 75 acts amended

=== 1998 ===
- Accident Insurance Act Amended: 1999/2000
- Anti-Personnel Mines Prohibition Act
- Crown Pastoral Land Act 1998
- Electricity Industry Reform Act Amended: 2001/04
- Farmers' Mutual Group Act
- Kirkpatrick Masonic Trust Empowering Act
- Land Transport Act
- Mental Health Commission Act Amended: 2007
- Ngai Tahu Claims Settlement Act 1998 Amended: 2005
- Public Service Investment Society Limited Act
- Rating Valuations Act
- University of Hawke's Bay Trust Board Dissolution and Vesting Act

Plus 83 acts amended and two acts repealed.

=== 1999 ===
- Animal Products Act Amended: 2002/05/07
- Animal Welfare Act 1999 Amended: 2000/01/02/05
- Apple and Pear Industry Restructuring Act Amended: 2001
- Children's Health Camps Board Dissolution Act
- Community Trusts Act
- Courts Security Act
- Dairy Industry Restructuring Act Amended: 2005/07
- Department of Child, Youth and Family Services Act
- Kiwifruit Industry Restructuring Act
- Maritime Crimes Act
- New Zealand Railways Staff Welfare Society Dissolution Act
- Ngati Turangitukua Claims Settlement Act Amended: 2003
- Nuclear-Test-Ban Act
- Personal Property Securities Act Amended: 2000/01/04/05/07
- Stamp Duty Abolition Act
- Veterans' Affairs Act
- Year 2000 Information Disclosure Act

Plus 99 acts amended and three acts repealed.

== See also ==
The above list may not be current and will contain errors and omissions. For more accurate information try:

- Walter Monro Wilson, The Practical Statutes of New Zealand, Auckland: Wayte and Batger 1867
- The Knowledge Basket: Legislation NZ
- New Zealand Legislation Includes some imperial and provincial acts. Only includes acts currently in force, and as amended.
- Legislation Direct List of statutes from 2003 to order
