= South Island =

One of the two main New Zealand islands

Te Waipounamu (Māori)
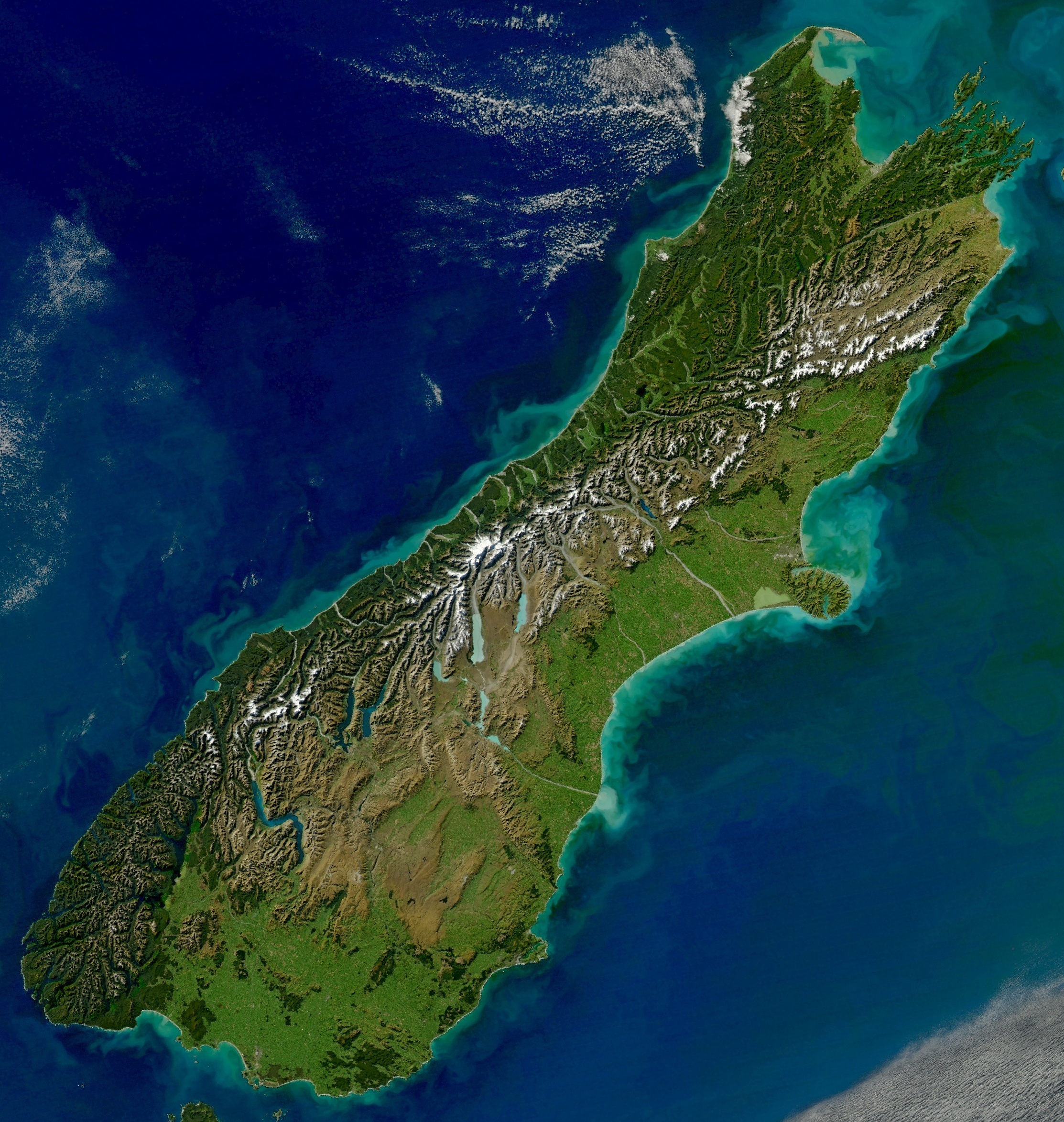
- Satellite photo, 2012

- Location within Oceania

Geography
- Location: Oceania
- Coordinates: 43.6°S 170.4°E
- Archipelago: New Zealand
- Area: 150,437 km^{2} (58,084 sq mi)
- Area rank: 12th
- Length: 840 km (522 mi)
- Coastline: 5,842 km (3630.1 mi)
- Highest elevation: 3,724 m (12218 ft)
- Highest point: Aoraki / Mount Cook

Administration
- New Zealand
- ISO 3166-2:NZ: NZ-S
- Regional councils: 4
- Territorial authorities: 23
- Largest settlement: Christchurch (pop. 407,800)

Demographics
- Demonym: South Islander
- Population: 1,256,700 (June 2025)
- Pop. density: 8.3/km^{2} (21.5/sq mi)
- Languages: English (New Zealand English, incl. 'Southern burr'); Māori (Southern dialects); New Zealand Sign; Mandarin; Hindi; Filipino
- Ethnic groups: European (82.8%); Māori (11.3%); Asian New Zealanders (10.3%); Pasifika (3.4%)

Additional information
- Time zone: New Zealand Standard Time (UTC+12)
  - Summer (DST): New Zealand Daylight Time (UTC+13)

The South Island (official alternative name Te Waipounamu, (Note: Māori pronunciation: [tɛ wɐipɔʉnɐmʉ], lit. 'the waters of greenstone'.) from Māori) is the larger of the two main islands of New Zealand by surface area, the other being the smaller but more populous North Island. With a population of 1,256,700 as of June 2025, the South Island is home to 24% of New Zealand's 5.3 million inhabitants. The most populous cities are Christchurch, Dunedin, Nelson and Invercargill.

The South Island is bordered to the north by Cook Strait, to the west by the Tasman Sea, to the south by Foveaux Strait and the Southern Ocean, and to the east by the Pacific Ocean. The South Island covers 150,437 square kilometres (58,084 sq mi), making it the world's 12th-largest island, constituting 56% of New Zealand's land area. At low altitudes, it has an oceanic climate.

The South Island is shaped by the Southern Alps, which run along the island from north to south. The Southern Alps include Aoraki / Mount Cook, at 3,724 metres (12,218 feet) New Zealand's highest peak. The Kaikōura Ranges lie to the northeast. The east side of the island is home to the Canterbury Plains, while the West Coast and Fiordland on the west are renowned for their rough coastlines, native bush and national parks, and the Fox and Franz Josef Glaciers.

Prior to European settlement, Te Waipounamu was sparsely populated by three major iwi – Kāi Tahu, Kāti Māmoe, and the historical Waitaha – with major settlements including in Kaiapoi Pā near modern-day Christchurch. During the Musket Wars expanding iwi colonised Te Tau Ihu, a region comprising parts of modern-day Tasman, Nelson and Marlborough, including Ngāti Kuia, Rangitāne, Ngāti Tama, and later Ngāti Toarangatira after Te Rauparaha's wars of conquest. British settlement of the South Island began with expansive and cheap land purchases early on, and settlers quickly outnumbered Māori. As a result the Wairau Affray was the only conflict of the New Zealand Wars to occur in the South Island.

Dunedin boomed during the 1860s Otago gold rush, which was shaped by extensive Chinese immigration. After the gold rushes in Otago and on the West Coast, the South Island held the majority of the European population and wealth. After the gold rushes the "drift to the north" meant the North Island displaced the South as the most populous. The North Island's population overtook the South Island's in the early 20th century, with 56% of the New Zealand population living in the North Island in 1911. The drift north of people and businesses continued throughout the twentieth century.

== Naming and usage ==
The island has been known in English as the 'South Island' for many years. The Māori language name for it, 'Te Waipounamu', is an official alternative name. 'Te Waipounamu' is most often translated as 'the water(s) of pounamu', but possibly evolved from 'Te Wāhi Pounamu' ('the place of pounamu'). It was first recorded in English by Captain James Cook on his voyage to New Zealand in 1769. North Island iwi alternatively used the name 'Te Waka-a-Māui' ('the canoe of Māui') for the South Island.

In the 19th century, some maps identified the South Island as 'Middle Island' or 'New Munster' (named after Munster province in Ireland), with the name 'South Island' or 'New Leinster' used for Stewart Island. In 1907, the Minister for Lands instructed the Land and Survey Department that the name 'Middle Island' was no longer to be used: "South Island will be adhered to in all cases".

The New Zealand Geographic Board found in 2009 that the South Island (along with the North Island) had no official name. After several years and at a cost of over $10,000, the island was officially named both "South Island" and "Te Waipounamu" on 17 October 2013, as announced by Minister for Land Information Maurice Williamson in the New Zealand Gazette. Three months of public consultation in April through July 2013 saw an "overwhelming" majority in support of choice between English and Māori names.

In prose, the two main islands of New Zealand are usually called the North Island and the South Island, including the definite article "the." It is also normal to use the preposition in rather than on, for example "Queenstown is in the South Island", "she lives in the South Island".

The island is occasionally referred to by residents as 'the Mainland'. A tourist train service called 'The Mainlander' is set to begin operating in January 2026 between Christchurch, Dunedin and Invercargill. There is also the Mainland brand of cheese which was formerly produced in Dunedin.

== Māori mythology ==
The island is also known as Te Waka a Māui which means "Māui's Canoe". In some modern iterations of Māori legends, the South Island existed first, as the boat of Māui, while the North Island was the fish that he caught.

Various Māori iwi sometimes use different names, with some preferring to call the South Island Te Waka o Aoraki. This refers to another Māori legend called the story of Aoraki: after the world was created, Aoraki and his three brothers came down in a waka (canoe) to visit their mother, Papatūānuku the earth mother, only to crash after failing to perform a karakia on their way back home to their father, Ranginui (also known as Raki) the sky father. The waka transformed into an island and the four brothers became the mountain ranges on top of it.

== History ==
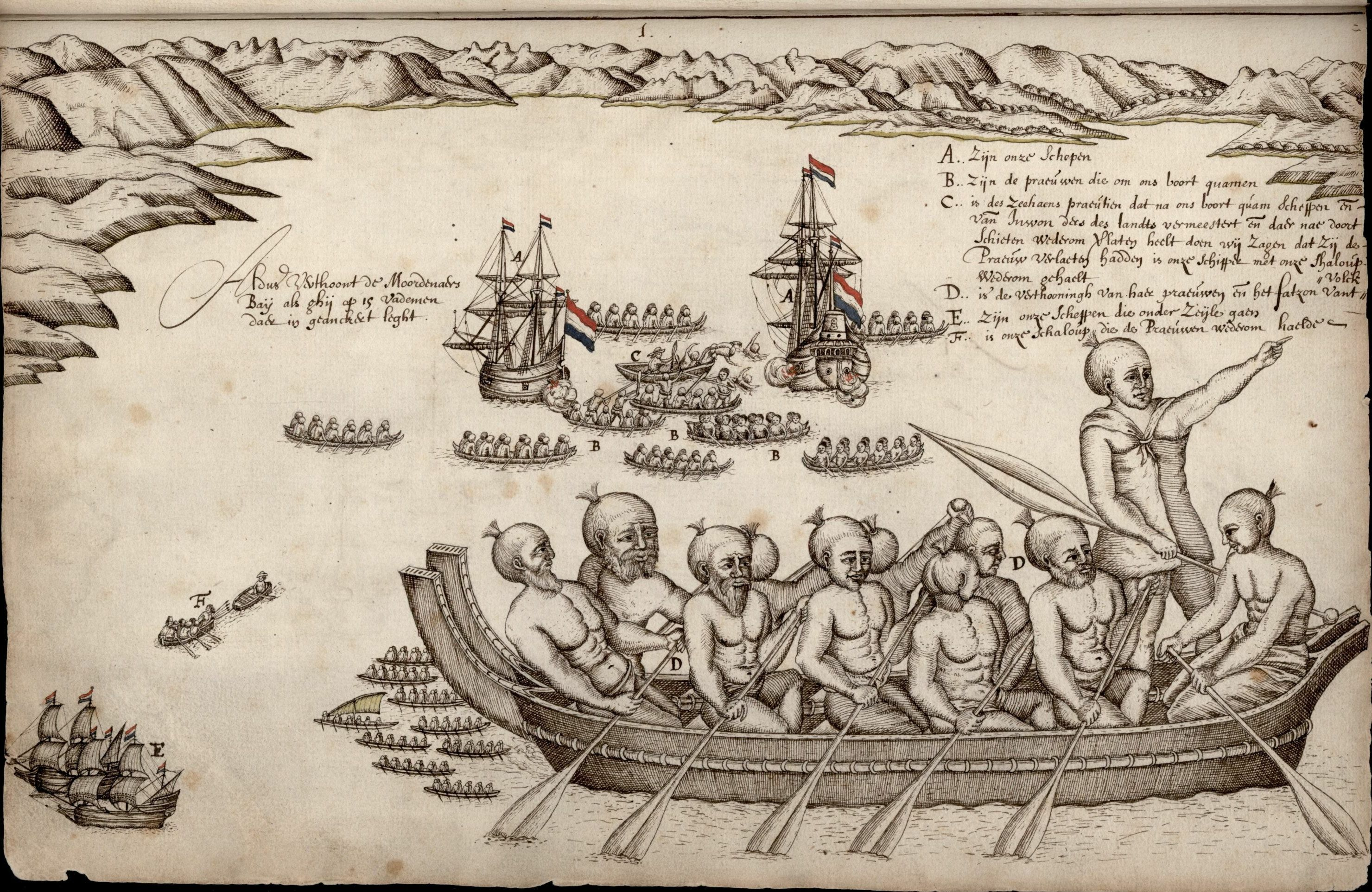
First European impression of Māori, at Murderers Bay, 1642

=== Early history (c. 1280 – c. 1820) ===
Archaeological investigations of the Wairau Bar in the north east of the South Island suggest that the site was part of the first era of colonisation of New Zealand, around 1288–1300 CE. Wairau Bar is a rare example in New Zealand of an early East Polynesian settlement clustered around a central point, and is described as "the type-site of the earliest phase of New Zealand's prehistory".

Rock art painted in red ochre and charcoal can be found on limestone rock shelters in over 550 different locations across the South Island. Stretching from Kaikōura to North Otago, the drawings are estimated to be between 500 and 800 years old and portray animals, people and fantastic creatures, possibly stylised reptiles. Some of the birds pictured are long extinct, including moa and Haast's eagles. They were drawn by early Māori, but by the time Europeans arrived, local Māori did not know the origins of the drawings.

Waitaha was an early Māori iwi (tribe) that settled in the South Island from the late 15th century. They were largely absorbed via marriage and conquest by the Kāti Māmoe in the 16th century. In the early 18th century, Ngāi Tahu, a Māori tribe who originated on the east coast of the North Island, began migrating to the northern part of the South Island. There they and Kāti Māmoe fought Ngāi Tara and Rangitāne in the Wairau Valley. Ngāti Māmoe then ceded the east coast regions north of the Waiau Toa / Clarence River to Ngāi Tahu. Ngāi Tahu continued to push south, conquering Kaikōura. By the 1730s, Ngāi Tahu had settled in Canterbury, including Banks Peninsula. From there they spread further south to Foveaux Strait and across into the West Coast. Kāti Māmoe were largely absorbed via marriage and conquest by the Ngāi Tahu as they migrated south, although many Ngāi Tahu have Kāti Māmoe links in their whakapapa and especially in the far south of the island.

==== European contact ====
The first known contact between Māori in the South Island and Europeans was when the Dutch explorer Abel Tasman arrived with his ships Heemskerck and Zeehaen. In December 1642, Tasman anchored in a bay at the northern end of the South Island that he named Murderers Bay following a clash with Māori, in which four crew were killed. He then sailed north to Tonga.

British naval captain James Cook of HM Bark Endeavour visited the South Island on his first voyage to the southern Pacific Ocean, around 127 years after Tasman in 1769–70. In mid-January 1770, Cook arrived at Ship Cove in Queen Charlotte Sound, on the north coast of the South Island. Ship Cove became an early site for sustained contact between Māori and Europeans, and Cook returned there during his second and third voyages. After leaving Ship Cove, Cook sailed down the east coast of the South Island, charting the coast and continuing the search for the southern continent. The Endeavour rounded South Cape, the southern-most point of Stewart Island on 10 March 1770, proving that the South Island was not the sought-after sixth continent. During Cook's second voyage on 17 December 1773, ten crew of the Adventure, the sister vessel to Cook's Resolution were killed and eaten by Ngāti Kuia and Rangitāne people in Queen Charlotte Sound.

From the 1780s, South Island Māori encountered European and American sealers and whalers. Some Māori crewed on the foreign ships, with many crewing on whaling and sealing ships that operated in New Zealand waters. Some of the South Island crews were almost totally Māori. Between 1800 and 1820, there were 65 sealing voyages and 106 whaling voyages to New Zealand, mainly from Britain and Australia.

In January 1827, the French explorer Jules Dumont d'Urville arrived in Tasman Bay on the corvette Astrolabe. A number of landmarks around Tasman Bay were named by d'Urville and his crew, including d'Urville Island, French Pass and Torrent Bay.

=== Musket wars 1827 – 1839 ===
In 1827–28, Ngāti Toa under the leadership of Te Rauparaha attacked and defeated Ngāi Tahu at Kaikōura. Ngāti Toa then visited Kaiapoi Pā (a fortified village), ostensibly to trade. When they attacked their hosts, the well-prepared Ngāi Tahu killed all the leading Ngāti Toa chiefs except Te Rauparaha, who returned to his Kapiti Island stronghold. In November 1830, Te Rauparaha persuaded Captain John Stewart of the brig Elizabeth to carry him and his warriors in secret to Akaroa, whereby in subterfuge they captured the leading Ngāi Tahu chief, Tama-i-hara-nui, and his wife and daughter. After destroying Tama-i-hara-nui's village, they took their captives to Kapiti and killed them. John Stewart was arrested and sent to trial in Sydney as an accomplice to murder, but escaped conviction.

In the summer of 1831–32 Te Rauparaha attacked the Kaiapoi Pā commencing a three-month siege, during which his men successfully sapped the pā. They then attacked Ngāi Tahu on Banks Peninsula and took the pā at Onawe. In 1832–33 Ngāi Tahu retaliated under the leadership of Tūhawaiki and others, attacking Ngāti Toa at Lake Grassmere. Ngāi Tahu prevailed, and killed many Ngāti Toa, although Te Rauparaha again escaped. Fighting continued for a year or so, with Ngāi Tahu maintaining the upper hand. Ngāti Toa never again made a major incursion into Ngāi Tahu territory.

In 1836, the Ngāti Tama chief Te Pūoho led a 100-person war party, armed with muskets, down the West Coast and over the Haast Pass. They fell on the Ngāi Tahu encampment between Lake Wānaka and Lake Hāwea, capturing ten people and killing and eating two children. Te Puoho took his captives over the Crown Range to Lake Wakatipu and thence to Southland, where he was killed, and his war party was destroyed by the southern Ngāi Tahu leader Tūhawaiki.

Ngāi Tahu and Ngāti Toa established peace by 1839, with Te Rauparaha releasing the Ngāi Tahu captives he held. Formal marriages between the leading families in the two tribes sealed the peace.

=== European settlement ===
The first permanent European settlement in the South Island was founded at Bluff in 1823 by whaler James Spencer who set up a trading post to supply visiting ships.

Akaroa, founded in 1840, is the oldest town in Canterbury. France wished to colonise New Zealand and sent out a group of immigrants who arrived at Akaroa on 18 August 1840 and established a French community there, supported by French naval officers and sailors.Following the signing of the Treaty of Waitangi at Waitangi in February 1840, Lieutenant-Governor Captain William Hobson declared British sovereignty over New Zealand on 21 May 1840 and the South Island, along with the rest of New Zealand, briefly became a part of the Colony of New South Wales. This declaration was due in part to the New Zealand Company's attempts to establish a separate colony in Wellington. The Treaty was signed at Akaroa on 28 May 1840.

On 17 June 1843, Māori and British settlers clashed at Wairau in what became known as the Wairau Affray or Wairau Massacre. It was the first serious clash of arms between the two parties after the signing of the Treaty of Waitangi and the only one to take place in the South Island. Four Māori and 22 settlers were killed. Twelve of the Europeans were shot dead or clubbed to death after surrendering to Māori who were pursuing them.

Settlement of Nelson began with the arrival of three New Zealand Company ships in November 1841. In March 1848, two ships carrying immigrants sponsored by the Free Church of Scotland arrived to begin settlement of Otago, and the Canterbury Settlement was established with the arrival of the 'First Four Ships' in Lyttelton in December 1850. Many more immigrant ships arrived in the South Island from the 1850s to the 1870s, and the population was also boosted by an influx of gold prospectors and miners in the 1860s. The European population of the South Island rose from 9,336 in 1851 to 296,644 (including Chinese) in 1881. For comparison, the non-Māori population of the North Island increased from 17,371 to 193,047 during the same period.

=== 1860s gold rushes ===
Gold was discovered at Gabriel's Gully in Central Otago in May 1861, sparking a gold rush. Dunedin prospered, becoming New Zealand's largest and wealthiest city by the end of the 1860s. The West Coast gold rush lasted from 1864 to 1867, attracting miners from Otago and Australia. It is estimated that in 1867 around 29,000 people (12% of New Zealand's European population, mostly men) lived on the West Coast.

Several thousand Chinese men, mostly from Guangdong, moved to New Zealand to work on the South Island goldfields, firstly in Otago and Southland and then on the West Coast. In 1882, about 40% of the population at the alluvial gold workings at Inangahua was Chinese. Although the first Chinese workers had been invited by the Otago Provincial government, they quickly became the target of hostility from white settlers, and laws were enacted to discourage them from coming to New Zealand.

=== Public works and infrastructure ===
With the onset of the West Coast gold rush in 1864, the Canterbury Provincial Government wanted to find a way over the Southern Alps from Canterbury to the West Coast. Investigation showed that a route via what is now known as Arthur's Pass was the best option, and in 1866 a road over the pass to Hokitika was opened.

The Lyttelton Rail Tunnel through the Port Hills opened in 1867, providing efficient movement of goods between the port at Lyttelton and Christchurch. The Main South Line railway linking Christchurch, Dunedin, and Invercargill was opened in 1878. The Midland rail line between Christchurch and Greymouth opened in 1923. The Otira Tunnel on the Midland Line runs under the Southern Alps between Arthur's Pass and Otira, a length of over 8.5 kilometres (5.3 mi). When the Otira Tunnel opened on 4 August 1923, it was the seventh longest tunnel in the world and the longest in the British Empire.

==== Hydroelectricity ====
Most of New Zealand's hydroelectric power is generated in the South Island and used in the North Island.

In August 1888, Reefton became the first locality in New Zealand to light its streets with electricity, using water from the Inangahua River to power a dynamo. (The first city to use electric street lighting was Wellington, in June 1889).

Early schemes such as the Waipori scheme in Otago, commissioned in 1903, and the Lake Coleridge power station commissioned in 1914 established New Zealand's use of hydroelectric energy. Roxburgh Dam began operating in 1956. By the early 1960s, most North Island hydro sites had been developed but the South Island still had many potential sites. Commissioning of the HVDC Inter-Island link in 1965 made it possible to send large amounts of electricity between the two islands, and from that time hydro capacity in the South Island increased rapidly. Major South Island developments included the Benmore Power Station (1966), Manapouri power station (1971), the Upper Waitaki River Scheme (1977–85) and the Clyde Dam (1992).

Construction of hydroelectric schemes in the South Island has met some opposition. The first nationwide environmental campaign in New Zealand was opposition to raising the water level of Lake Manapouri for a power station to supply electricity to the Tiwai Point Aluminium Smelter. The Save Manapouri Campaign was a success and the power station was built without raising the level of the lake outside of its natural range.

Construction of the Clyde Dam near Cromwell created Lake Dunstan, which meant that many of Cromwell's buildings had to be relocated from the area to be flooded. Some of the historic buildings were saved or rebuilt to create a heritage precinct.

=== High country farming ===
From the 1850s, settlers established high country stations on dry tussock-covered land 600m or more above sea level in central Otago and in the foothills of the Southern Alps in Canterbury. High country stations typically farmed sheep, often using sheep farming methods from the Scottish Highlands. Wool was a valuable product that did not spoil when transported long distances. Life on high country stations revolved around an annual cycle of mustering (bringing the animals down from the hills), shearing, lambing, weaning and winter feeding, and a mythos grew up around the image of the stoic 'Southern man' working alone on the hills. Runholders built huts and sheds for the annual cycle of mustering and shearing sheep. The Department of Conservation now manages a number of historic huts and sites related to high country farming in Nelson/Marlborough, Canterbury, Otago and Southland. A few sites are administered by Heritage New Zealand.

The government owned the land and leased it to runholders on 99-year leases. Between 1880 and the early 1900s, many properties were abandoned or destocked for various periods because of problems caused by overgrazing, animal disease issues, weather events and plagues of rabbits. Rabbits had been introduced to New Zealand in the 1830s but quickly became a problem. They depleted pasture, which encouraged weeds to take over, and accelerated erosion in hill country. Early large stations began to be broken up into smaller runs that could be farmed more efficiently.

By 1948 much of the South Island high country was in a poor state, so the Crown introduced the Land Act 1948. This provided for "a perpetually renewable 'pastoral lease' to give farming families on these lands the ability to farm for future generations and long-term sustainability". The farmer has exclusive possession of the land and the right to graze it, and owns improvements made such as fencing and buildings. The farmer does not own the soil and must keep pests and weeds under control.

High country sheep farming became less profitable from about this time due to higher labour costs, loss of subsidies, environmental issues and lower returns. The Crown Pastoral Land Act 1998 began a process of tenure review. Runholders could gain freehold title to areas that could be "sustainably farmed", while unsustainable land would revert to management by DOC for conservation purposes. The Act was controversial, with some claiming that high country land was on-sold to foreigners who then used the land for golf courses and housing estates.

== Geography ==
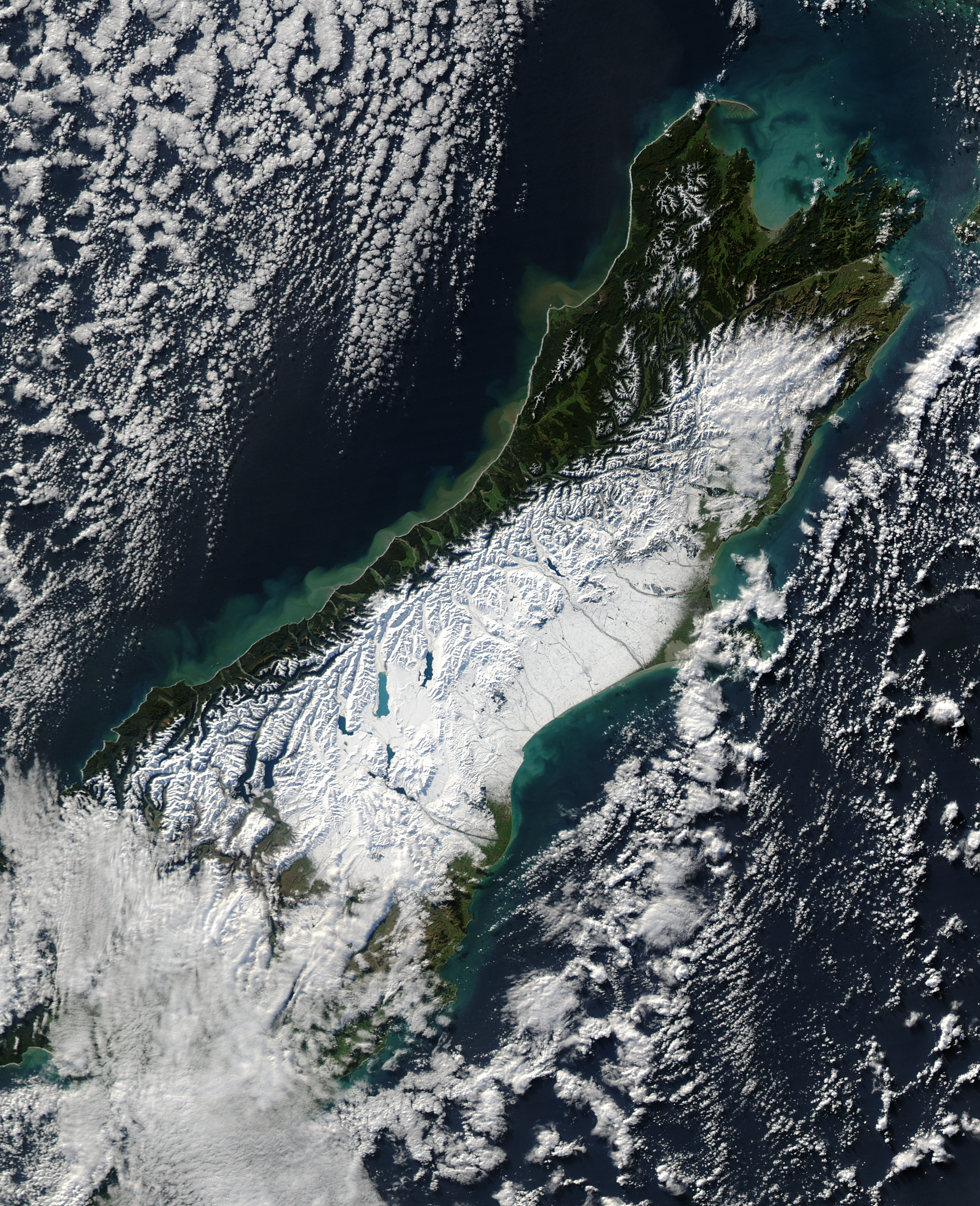
A true-colour image of the South Island, after a powerful winter storm swept across New Zealand on 12 June 2006

The South Island, with an area of 150,437 km^{2} (58,084 sq mi), is the largest landmass of New Zealand; it contains about one-quarter of the New Zealand population and is the world's 12th-largest island. It is divided along its length by the Southern Alps, the highest peak of which is Aoraki / Mount Cook at 3,724 metres (12,218 ft), with the high Kaikōura Ranges to the northeast. There are eighteen peaks of more than 3,000 metres (9,800 ft) in the South Island. The east side of the island is home to the Canterbury Plains while the western side is renowned for its rough coastlines in Fiordland and along the West Coast, a very high proportion of native bush, and Fox and Franz Josef Glaciers.

The mountains of the South Island are exposed to prevailing westerly winds from the Tasman Sea, leading to high orographic rainfall and the creation of streams and rivers. These contribute to erosion, and together with continuing uplift and the effects of glaciation create vast quantities of gravel and loess. Glaciation, rivers and gravels have formed the Canterbury Plains and other South Island flood plains. Most of the loess has formed on the eastern side of the South Island, because of the prevailing winds.

=== Geology ===
During the Last Glacial Period when sea levels were over 100 metres lower than present day levels, the North and South Islands were connected by a vast coastal plain that formed at the South Taranaki Bight. Similarly, the South Island and Stewart Island were connected by coastal plains that covered modern-day Foveaux Strait. During this period, most of the South Island was covered in grassland and glaciers, compared to the woodlands and rainforest that grew in the more temperate North Island. Sea levels began to rise 7,000 years ago, eventually separating the islands and linking the Cook Strait to the Tasman Sea.

The South Island lies on the boundary between two tectonic plates, the Pacific plate and the Indo-Australian plate. The Alpine Fault is a geological fault about 600 km (370 mi) long that runs almost the entire length of the South Island on the boundary between the two plates. There is movement of around 37 mm (1.5 in) per year along the Alpine Fault, very fast by global standards. This is mostly strike-slip (sideways) movement, with the Tasman district and West Coast moving north and Canterbury and Otago moving south. The last major earthquake on the Alpine Fault was in about 1717 AD with a great (M_{w} ≥8) earthquake magnitude of M_{w} 8.1± 0.1. The probability of another one occurring before 2068 was estimated at 75 percent in 2021.

However, compression also occurs because there is 11° of convergence at the boundary. For most of the length of the Alpine Fault, the compression forces the continental crust of the Pacific plate up and over the continental crust of the Indo-Australian plate, creating uplift of 1 to 11 mm (0.039 to 0.433 in) per year in different places, and forming the Southern Alps. This uplift has been occurring for at least 5 myr, leading to a total uplift of 50 km (31 mi) over the period, although almost all of this is lost to erosion. From Fiordland south, the Indo-Australian plate subducts beneath the Pacific plate, with the boundary between the two plates forming the Macquarie Ridge complex extending 1,600 km (990 mi) to the south of New Zealand.

Some of New Zealand's major earthquakes have occurred in the South Island. The 1929 Murchison earthquake caused landslides and widespread damage to roads, bridges and buildings and resulted in 17 deaths. The Inangahua earthquake occurred on the Alpine Fault in 1968. It killed three people and caused widespread damage to roads, railway tracks and other infrastructure. On 4 September 2010, the South Island was struck by a 7.1 magnitude earthquake that caused extensive damage, several power outages, and many aftershocks. Five and a half months later, the 6.3 magnitude 22 February Christchurch earthquake caused far more damage in Christchurch, resulting in 181 deaths. This quake was centred closer at Lyttelton, and shallower than the prior quake, consequently causing extensive damage. There were no fatalities in the Seddon earthquake of 2013, but it caused damage to buildings in Wellington. In 2016 the Kaikōura earthquake caused the closure of State Highway 1 between Picton and Waipara and the Main North Line of the railways. Two people died.

=== Natural geographic features ===
==== Southern Alps ====
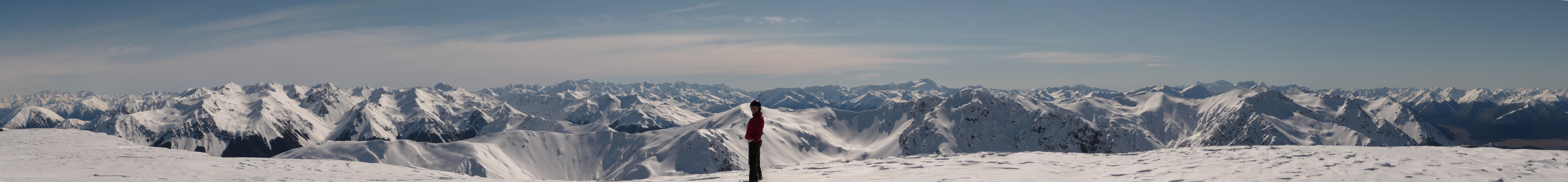
Panoramic view of some of the Southern Alps in winter from the summit of Hamilton Peak in the Craigieburn Range

The Southern Alps (officially Southern Alps / Kā Tiritiri o te Moana) are a range of mountains that extend for approximately 500 km (310 mi) northeast to southwest along much of the length of the South Island. They were created by the meeting of the Pacific and Indo-Australian tectonic plates. The range includes the South Island's 'Main Divide', which separates the water catchments of the more heavily populated eastern side of the island from those on the West Coast.

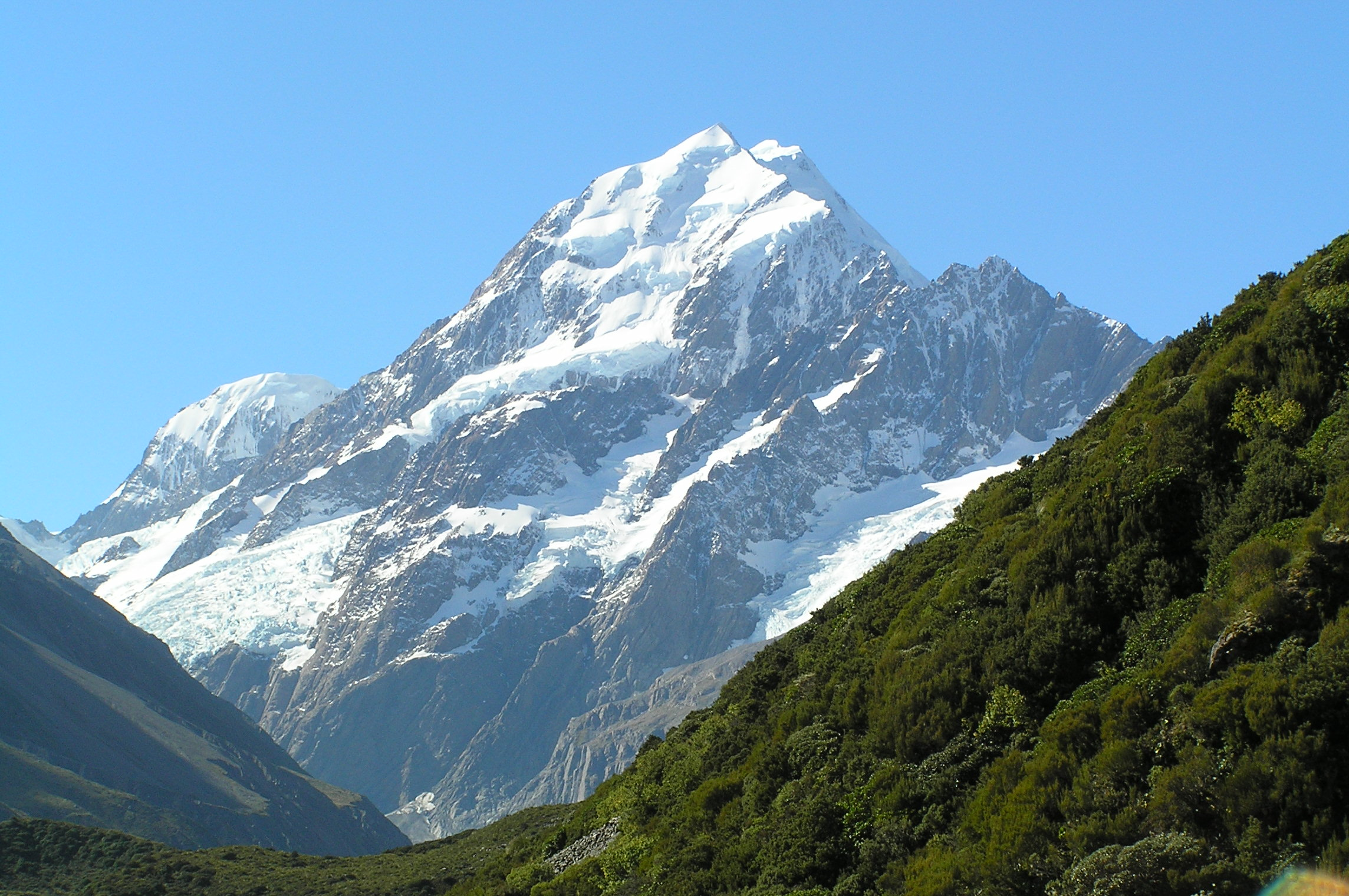
Aoraki / Mount Cook is the tallest mountain in New Zealand.

The tallest peak of the Southern Alps is Aoraki / Mount Cook, the highest point in New Zealand at 3,724 m (12,218 ft). The Southern Alps include sixteen other points that exceed 3,000 m (9,800 ft) in height. The mountain ranges are bisected by glacial valleys, many of which on the eastern side are infilled with glacial lakes, including Lake Coleridge in the north and Lake Wakatipu in Otago in the south.

Settlements within the Southern Alps include Maruia Springs, a spa near Lewis Pass, the town of Arthur's Pass, and Mount Cook Village. Major crossings of the Southern Alps in the New Zealand road network include Lewis Pass (SH 7), Arthur's Pass (SH 73), Haast Pass (SH 6), and the road to Milford Sound (SH 94). The TranzAlpine train operates on the Midland Line between Greymouth and Christchurch, crossing the Southern Alps at Arthur's Pass.

===== Glaciers =====
Most of New Zealand's glaciers are in the South Island, generally found in the Southern Alps near the Main Divide. According to inventories conducted in the late 1970s and 1980s, the Southern Alps contained over 3,000 glaciers larger than one hectare. About a sixth of these glaciers covered more than 10 hectares. These include the Fox and Franz Josef glaciers on the West Coast, and the Tasman, Hooker, Mueller and Murchison glaciers in the east. The Tasman Glacier is the longest, reaching 23.5 km (14.6 mi) in length. It has retreated from a recent maximum of 29 km (18 mi) in the 1960s.

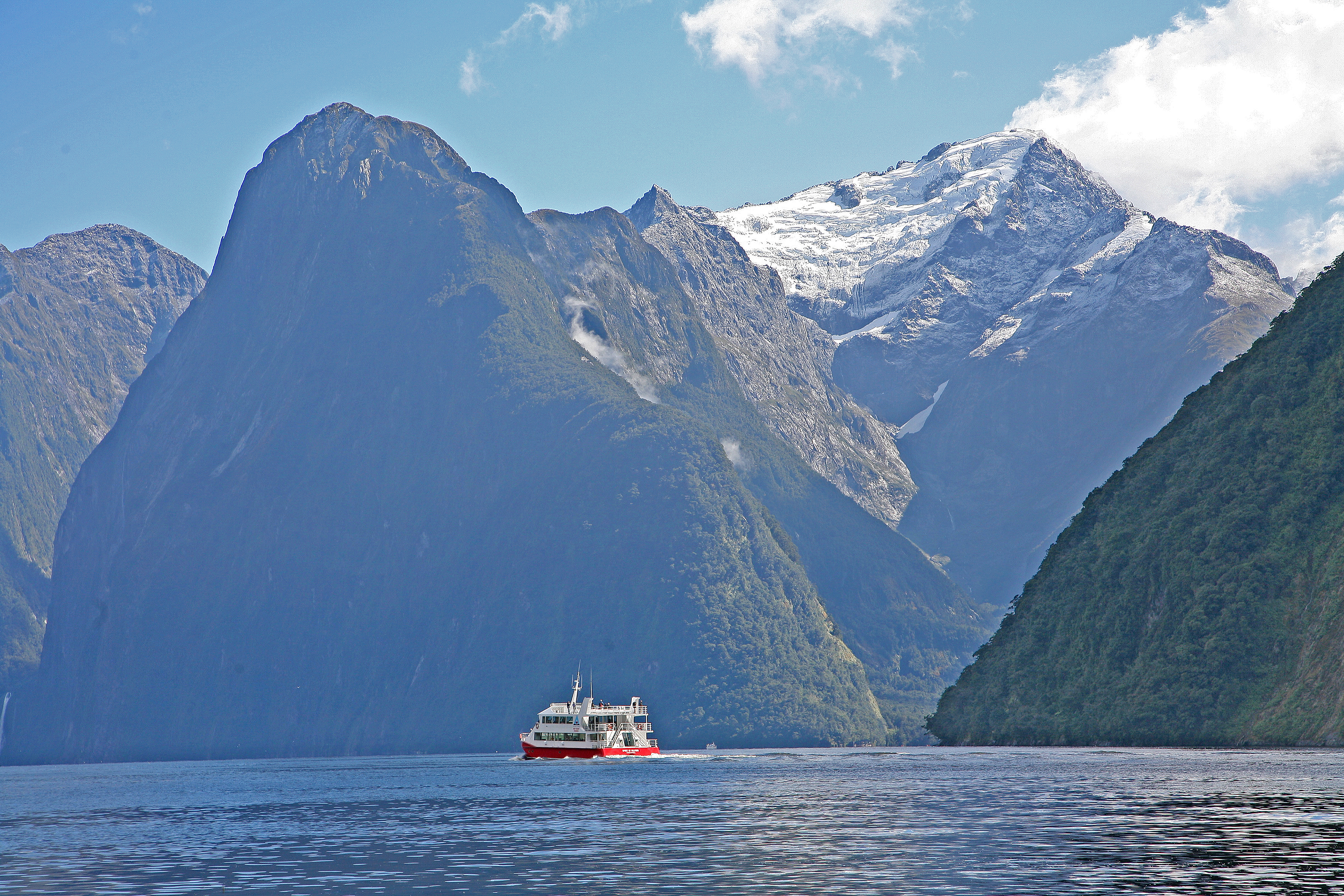
Typical view of Milford Sound / Piopiotahi featuring Mount Pembroke

==== Fiords and lakes ====
The South Island has 15 named maritime fiords, which are all located in the southwest of the island in a mountainous area known as Fiordland. The spelling 'fiord' is used in New Zealand rather than 'fjord', although all the maritime fiords have the word 'Sound' in their name instead. (The Marlborough Sounds, a series of deep indentations in the coastline at the northern tip of the South Island, are in fact rias, drowned river valleys.)

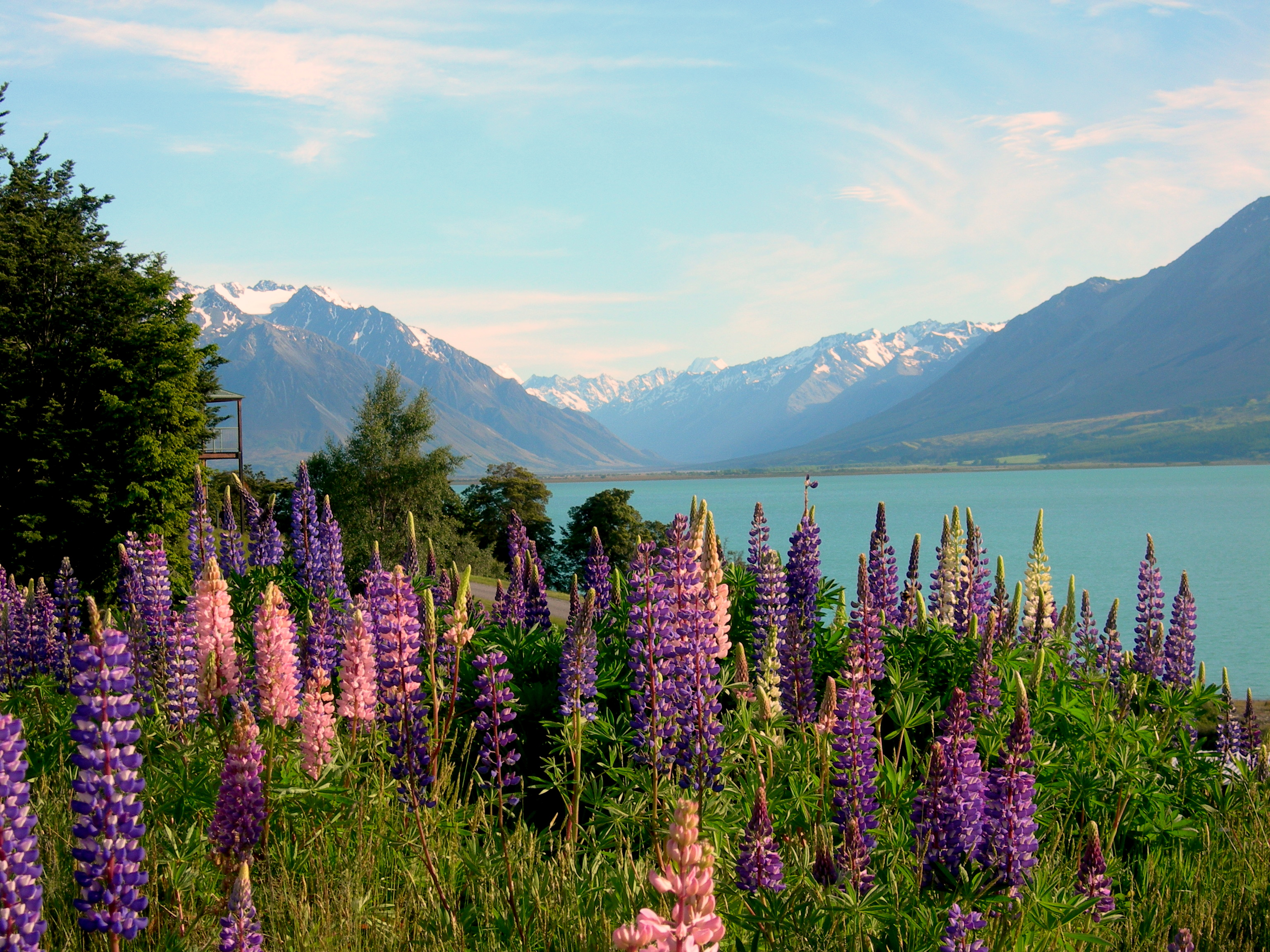
Lake Ōhau

The South Island has eight of New Zealand's 10 biggest lakes, some of which are fiords that became dammed. Much of the higher country in the South Island was covered by ice during the glacial periods of the last two million years. Advancing glaciers eroded large steep-sided valleys and often formed moraines, accumulations of rocks and soil that acted as natural dams. When the glaciers retreated, they left basins that are now filled by lakes. Lake McKerrow / Whakatipu Waitai to the north of Milford Sound / Piopiotahi is a fiord with a silted-up mouth. Lake Manapouri has fiords as its west, north and south arms. Lake Te Anau has three western arms, which are fiords (and are so named). Lake Wakatipu fills a large glacial valley, as do lakes Hakapoua, Poteriteri, Monowai and Hauroko in the far south of Fiordland. Lake Hauroko is the deepest (462 m) lake in New Zealand, and one of the deepest lakes in the world.

The water level of most glacial lakes in the upper parts of the Waitaki and Clutha / Mata-Au rivers is controlled for electricity generation. Hydroelectric reservoirs are common in South Canterbury and Central Otago. The largest of these is Lake Benmore, an artificial lake created in the 1960s on the Waitaki River.

Millions of years ago in the Miocene, Central Otago had a huge lake – Lake Manuherikia. It slowly filled in with mud, and fossils of plants, fish, birds and crocodiles have been found there. A group of fossils from the ancient lake that has been studied is known as the St Bathans fauna.

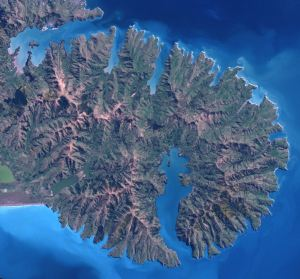
Banks Peninsula is roughly circular, with many bays and two deep harbours.

==== Volcanoes ====
There are extinct volcanoes in the South Island, all located on the east coast.

Banks Peninsula forms the most prominent of these volcanic features. The peninsula comprises the eroded remnants of two large shield volcanoes. These formed due to intraplate volcanism between about eleven and eight million years ago (Miocene) on a continental crust and together are known as the Banks Peninsula Volcano complex. The peninsula formed as offshore islands, with the volcanoes reaching to about 1,500 m above sea level. Two dominant craters formed Lyttelton / Whakaraupō and Akaroa Harbours. The portion of the crater rim lying between Lyttelton Harbour / Whakaraupō and Christchurch city forms the Port Hills.

Otago Harbour was formed from the drowned remnants of a giant shield volcano (the Dunedin Volcano) centred close to what is now the town of Port Chalmers. The remains of this violent origin can be seen in the basalt of the surrounding hills. The last eruptive phase ended some ten million years ago, leaving the prominent peak of Mount Cargill.

Timaru was constructed on rolling hills created from the lava flows of the extinct Mount Horrible, which last erupted many thousands of years ago.

=== Climate ===
The climate in the South Island is mostly temperate. The mean temperature for the South Island is 8 °C (46 °F). January and February are the warmest months, while July is the coldest. Historical maxima and minima are 42.4 °C (108.3 °F) in Rangiora, Canterbury, and −25.6 °C (−14.1 °F) in Ranfurly, Otago.

Conditions vary sharply across the regions, from extremely wet on the West Coast to semi-arid in the Mackenzie Basin of inland Canterbury. Most areas have between 600 and 1,600 mm (24–63 in) of rainfall annually, with the most rain along the West Coast and the least rain on the East Coast, predominantly on the Canterbury Plains. Christchurch is the driest city, receiving about 640 millimetres (25 in) of rain per year, while Invercargill is the wettest, receiving about 1,150 millimetres (45 in). The southern and south-western parts of South Island have a cooler and cloudier climate, with around 1,400–1,600 hours of sunshine annually; the northern and north-eastern parts of the South Island are the sunniest areas and receive about 2,400–2,500 hours.

=== Biodiversity and conservation ===
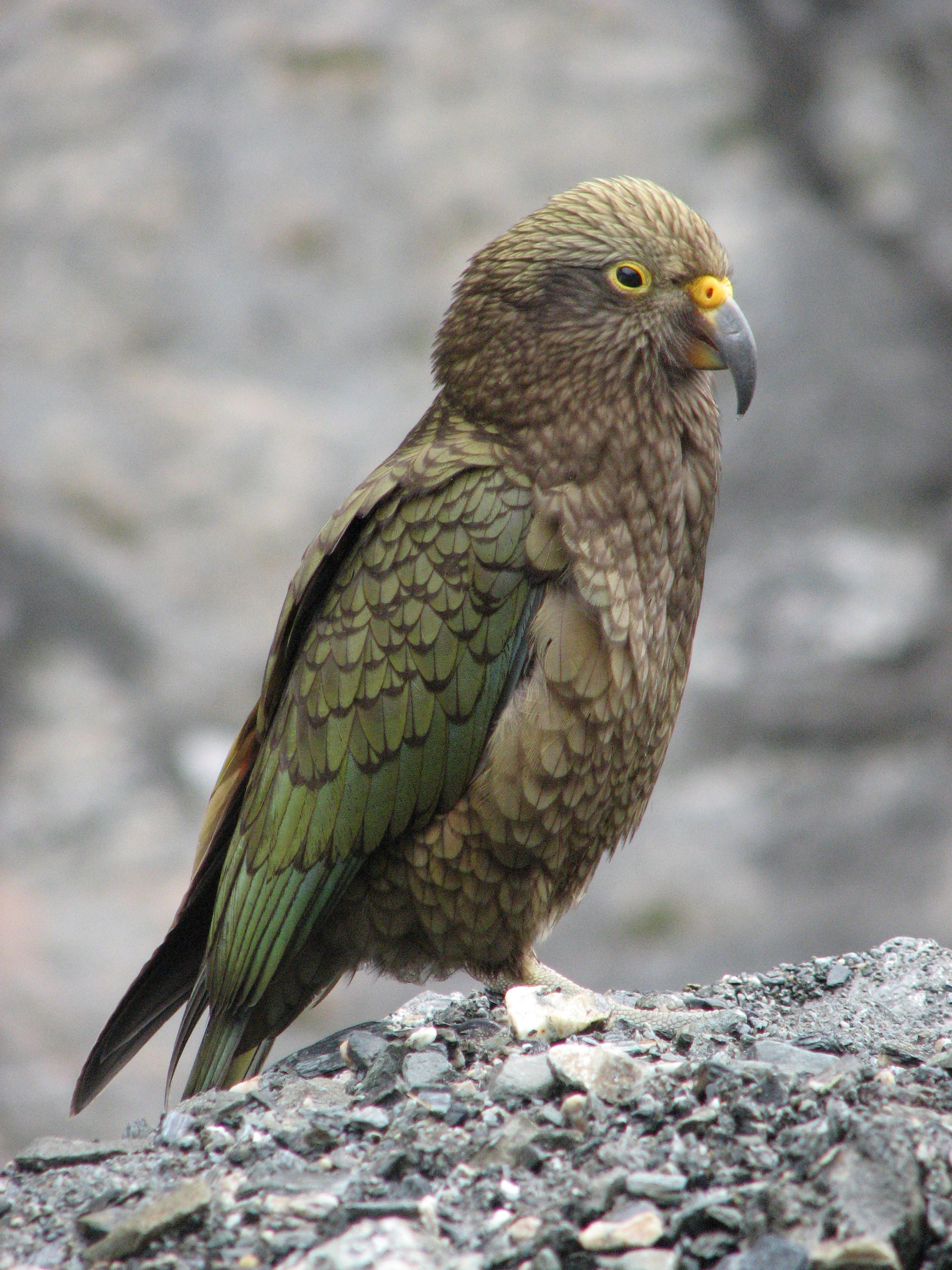
Kea, a mountain parrot

Several bird species are endemic to the South Island. They include the kea, great spotted kiwi, Okarito brown kiwi, South Island kōkako, South Island pied oystercatcher, Malherbe's parakeet, king shag, takahē, black-fronted tern, South Island robin, rock wren, wrybill, and yellowhead. Many South Island bird species are now extinct, mainly due to hunting by humans and predation by mammals introduced by humans. Extinct species include the South Island goose, South Island giant moa, Haast's eagle and South Island piopio. The South Island kōkako is also likely to be extinct.

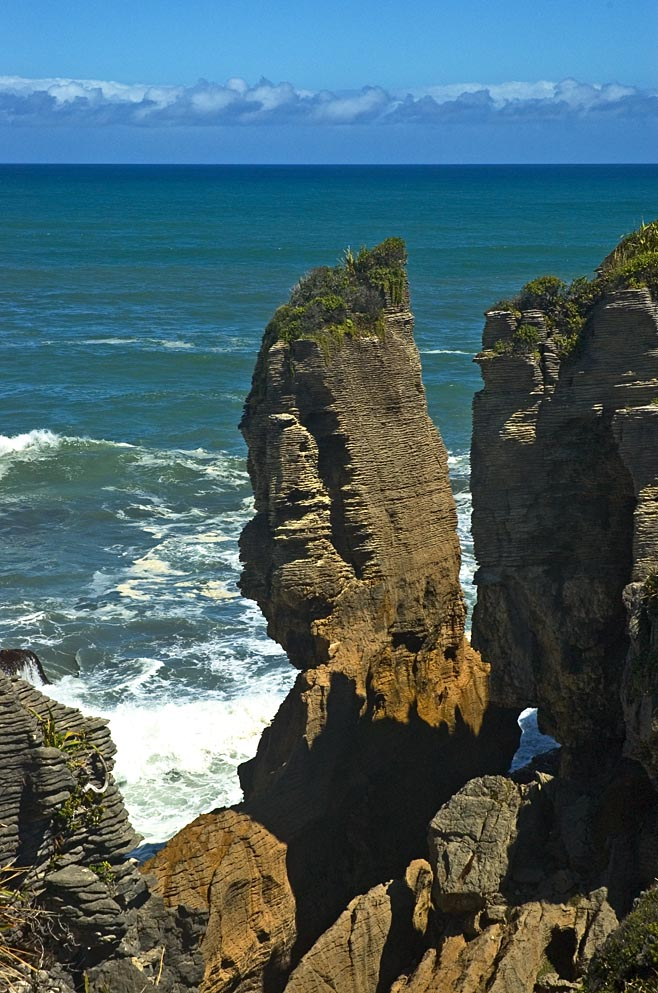
The famous "Pancake Rocks" at Paparoa National Park

Nine of New Zealand's thirteen national parks are in the South Island. They are known for their scenery and geographic features, such as the Pancake Rocks in Paparoa National Park, and are popular recreation and tourism areas. Arthur's Pass National Park, established in 1929, is the oldest. Fiordland National Park (established 1952) is New Zealand's largest and one of the largest in the world. Kahurangi National Park, established in 1996, is the newest and the country's second-largest. Abel Tasman National Park is New Zealand's smallest, at 225 km^{2}.

Te Wāhipounamu, in the south-west corner of the island, is a World Heritage Site that incorporates Westland Tai Poutini National Park, Aoraki / Mount Cook National Park, Mount Aspiring National Park and Fiordland National Park. Inscribed on the World Heritage List in 1990, it covers 26,000 square kilometres (10,000 sq mi). It is thought to contain some of the best modern representations of the original flora and fauna present in Gondwanaland, one of the reasons for listing as a World Heritage Site.

The Conservation Act 1987 defines a conservation park as an area with predominantly natural systems, managed to maintain protection of ecosystems and historical resources while also providing visitor access. Pre-existing forest parks were transferred to the Department of Conservation in 1987 and became 'conservation parks', but have retained the designation 'forest park'. Conservation and forest parks have a less stringent level of protection than national parks and are used for a wide variety of recreational and commercial activities. There are five forest parks in the South Island that are on public land administered by the Department of Conservation: Mount Richmond Forest Park in Marlborough, Craigieburn, Hanmer and Lake Sumner Forest Parks in Canterbury, and Victoria Forest Park in the West Coast region.

In addition to forest parks, there are a number of conservation parks in the South Island, including: Ahuriri, Hakatere, Ruataniwha and Te Kahui Kaupeka Conservation Parks in Canterbury; Oteake Conservation Park in Waitaki; Te Papanui and Hāwea Conservation Parks in Otago; and Eyre Mountains / Taka Ra Haka and Catlins Conservation Park in Southland.

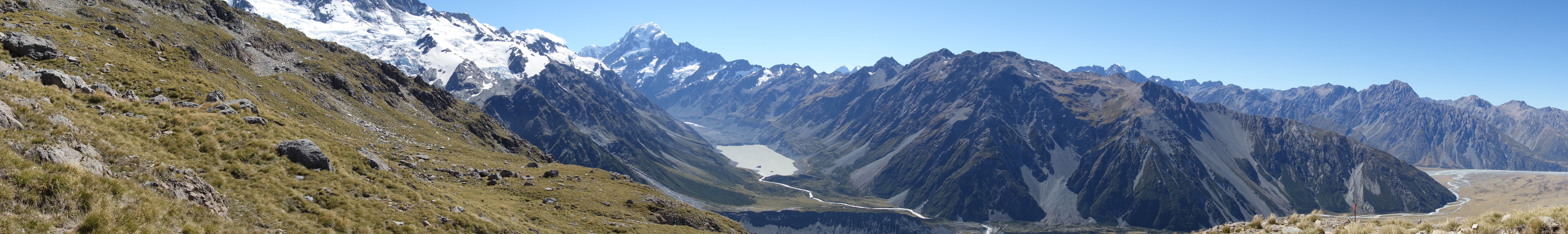
Hooker Valley at Aoraki / Mount Cook National Park, with Aoraki / Mount Cook, the highest mountain in New Zealand at 3,724 metres (12,218 feet), and Hooker Lake in the background

== Demographics ==
=== Population ===
Historical population
Year	Pop.	±% p.a.
1991	852,843	—
1996	899,382	+1.07%
2001	906,759	+0.16%
2006	1,022,313	+2.43%
2013	1,058,058	+0.49%
2018	1,149,564	+1.67%
2023	1,185,282	+0.61%

Compared to the more populated and multi-ethnic North Island, the South Island has a smaller, more homogeneous resident population of 1,256,700 (June 2025).

In the early years of European settlement in New Zealand, the South Island's percentage of the New Zealand population was far higher than it is today, equalling or even exceeding the population of the North Island. This was exacerbated by the New Zealand Wars and the Otago gold rush of the 1860s. Since that time, the South Island's population as a percentage of the country's total population has steadily decreased, with the population of the South Island now being less than that of the North Island's largest city, Auckland. This disparity has stabilised in recent years, with the 2013 and 2018 censuses both showing the South Island to have around 23%–24% of the national population. The South Island had a population of 1,185,282 at the 2023 census, an increase of 80,745 people (7.3%) since the 2018 census, and an increase of 180,882 people (18.0%) since the 2013 census.

In June 2025, Statistics New Zealand released new figures from the 2023 Census showing that 86,000 people moved from the North Island to the South Island between 2018 and 2023. During that same period, 30,000 people migrated from the South Island to the North Island.

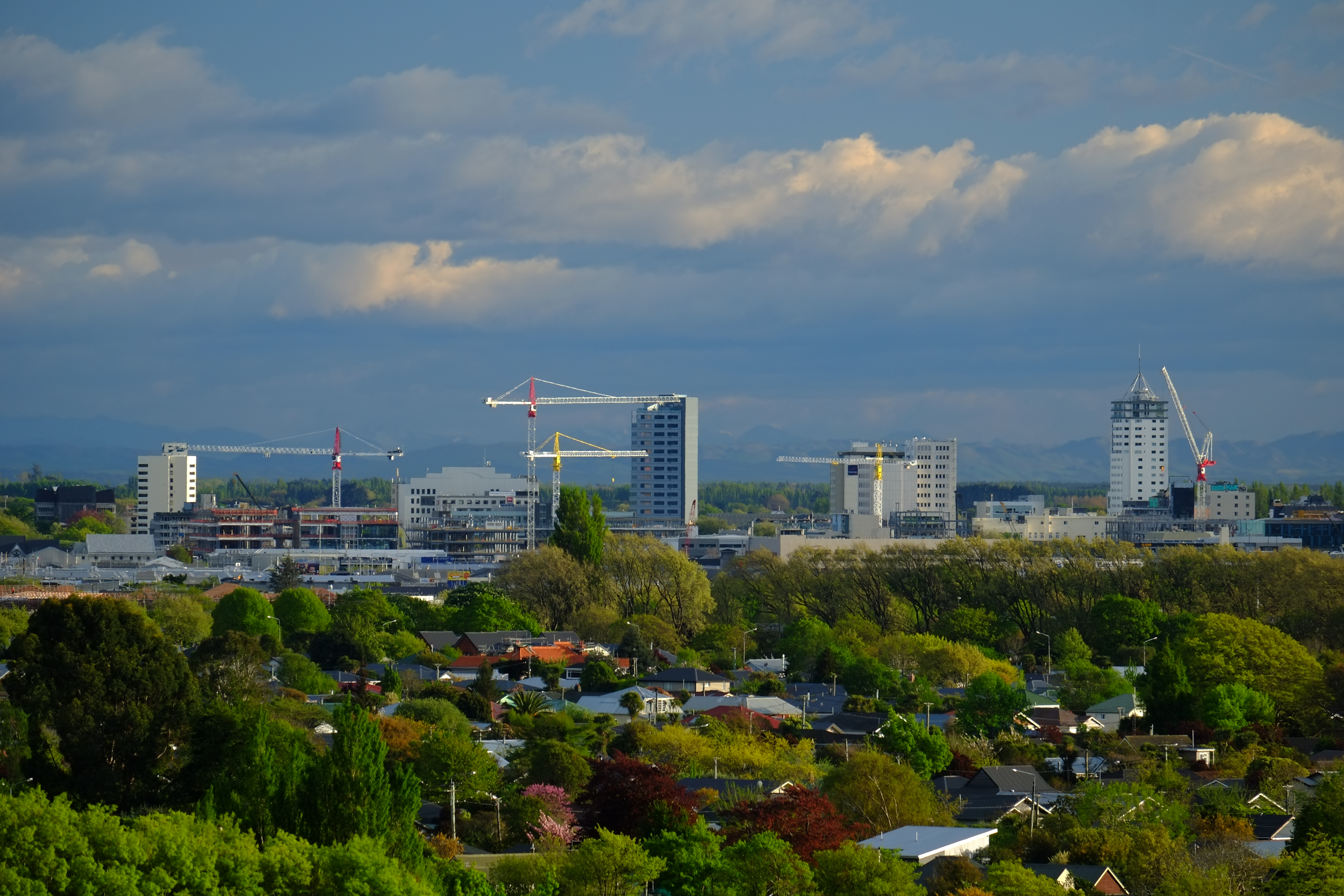
Christchurch, the most populous city in the South Island

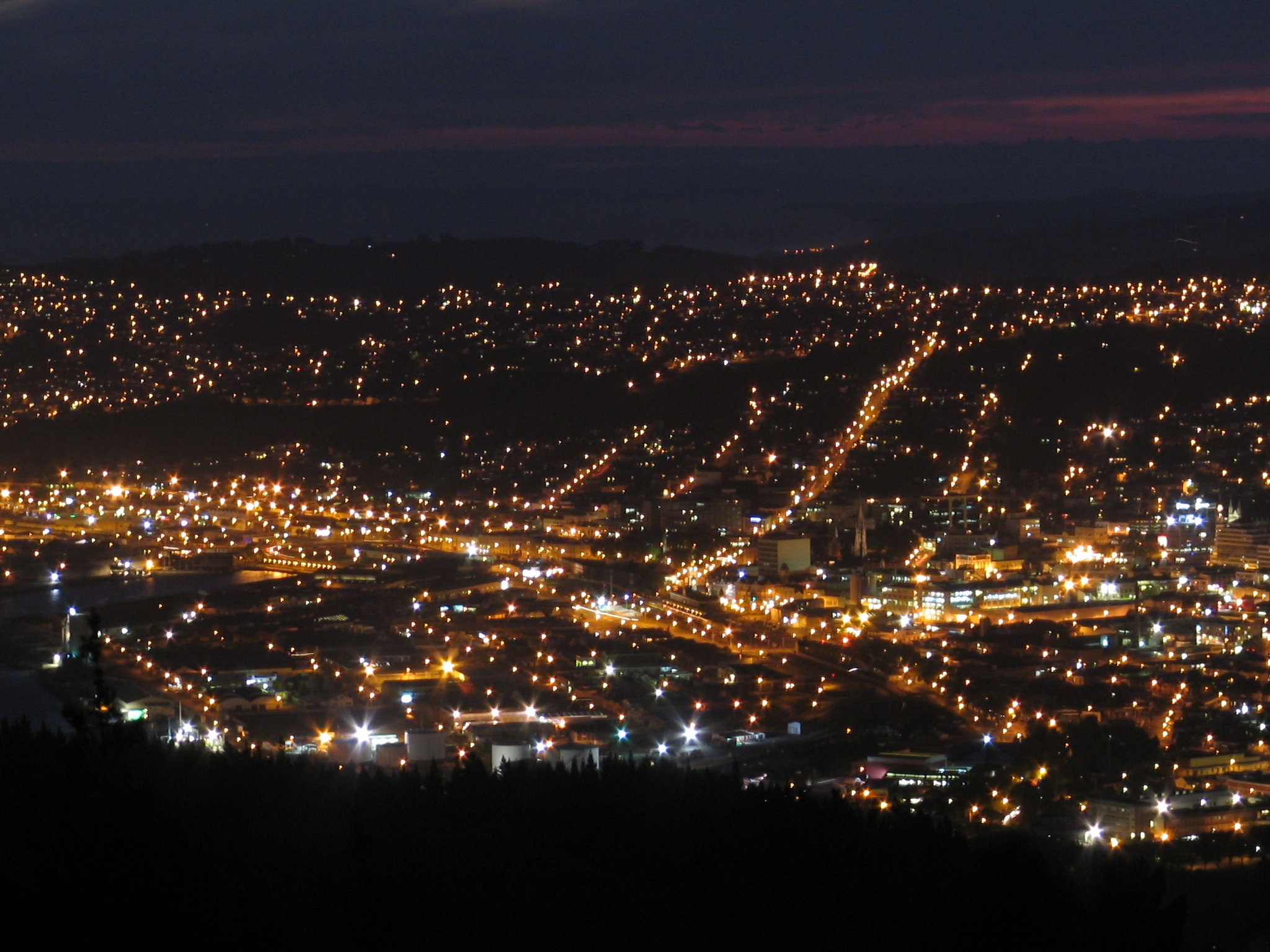
Dunedin

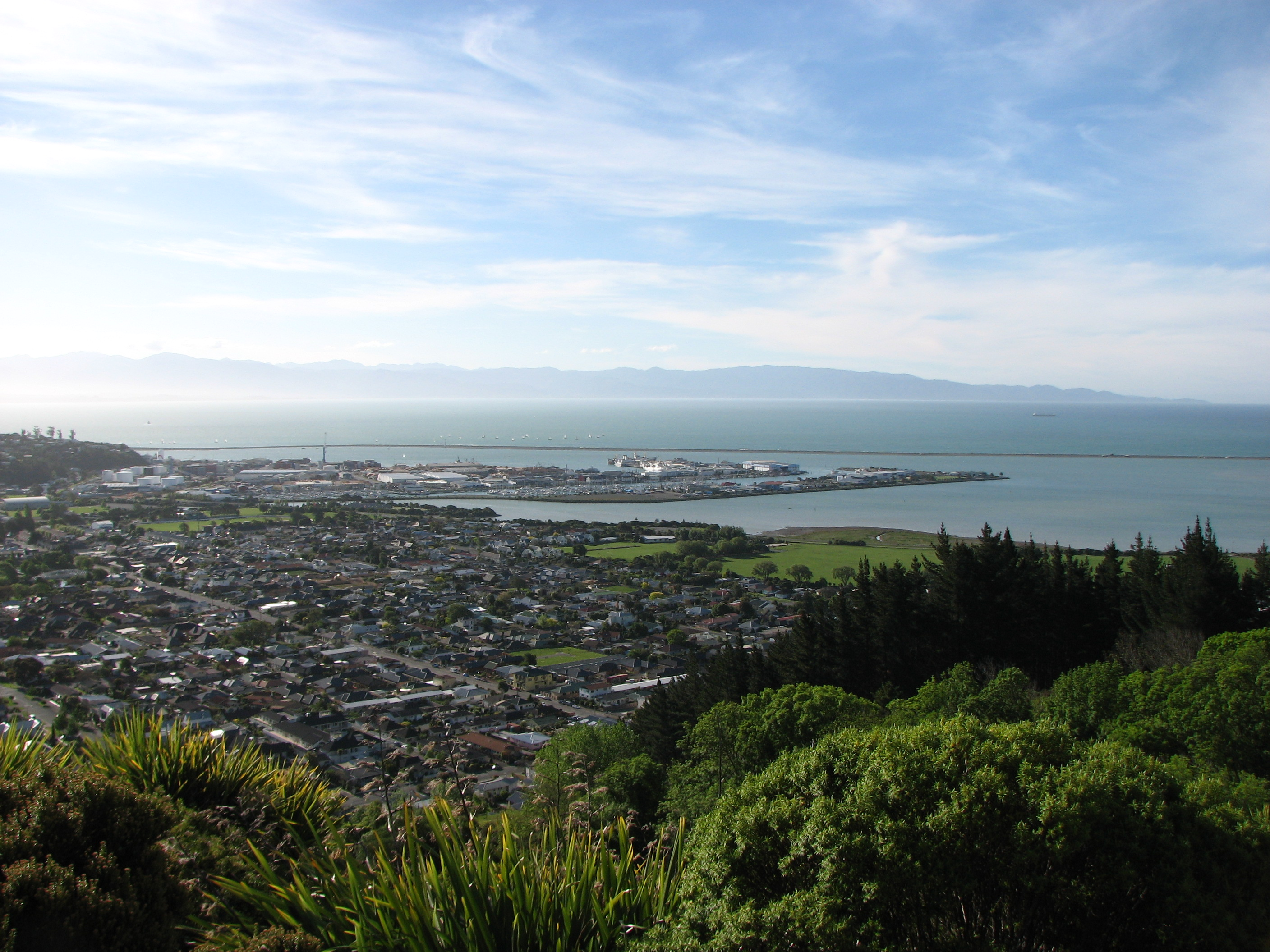
Nelson

At the 2023 census, 77.0% of South Islanders identified as New Zealand European (Pākehā), 11.3% as Māori, 2.6% as Chinese, 2.3% each as Indian and Filipino, 1.6% as Samoan, 1.5% as English, and 1.2% as 'New Zealander'. Percentages add to more than 100% as people can identify with more than one ethnicity. New Zealand Europeans form the majority in all districts of the South Island, ranging from 67.5% in the Queenstown-Lakes District to 87.2% in the Grey District.

The proportion of South Islanders born overseas at the 2018 census was 23.1%. The most common foreign countries of birth are England (19.9% of overseas-born residents), the Philippines (9.3%), Australia (8.8%), India (6.6%), Mainland China (5.9%) and South Africa (5.5%).

=== Urbanisation ===
The South Island is sparsely populated and still predominantly rural areas or nature reserves. However, there are 16 urban areas in the South Island with a population of 10,000 or more:

Name	Population (June 2025)	% of island
Christchurch	407,800	32.5%
Dunedin	104,000	8.3%
Invercargill	51,200	4.1%
Nelson	50,800	4.0%
Rolleston	34,100	2.7%
Blenheim	29,800	2.4%
Timaru	29,300	2.3%
Queenstown	29,000	2.3%
Ashburton	21,600	1.7%
Richmond	19,950	1.6%
Rangiora	19,300	1.5%
Mosgiel	15,100	1.2%
Oamaru	14,300	1.1%
Kaiapoi	13,700	1.1%
Wānaka	13,200	1.1%
Lincoln	12,100	1.0%

== Culture ==
=== In art ===
A number of New Zealand's prominent artists have been heavily influenced by the light and landforms of the South Island. John Gully, occasionally known as 'the Turner of New Zealand' was known for his watercolour landscapes of South Island locations in the 19th century. Rita Angus lived in Christchurch in the 1930s and 1940s and painted many scenes of Canterbury and Otago. Her 1936 painting Cass, portraying a small railway station and the emptiness of the Canterbury landscape, was voted New Zealand's most-loved painting in a 2006 television poll. Toss Woollaston was based in Greymouth in the 1950s and painted many landscapes depicting the West Coast. Leo Bensemann painted over 60 landscapes of the area around Golden Bay in the Tasman District during the 1960s–1980s. Grahame Sydney is an artist based in Otago whose works focus on the elements of human impact on Otago's empty landscapes.

In the 1960s and 1970s, Mona Anderson was a popular author in New Zealand, writing about life on a South Island high country station. She is best known for A River Rules My Life. Two Booker Prize-winning novels have been set in the South Island. Keri Hulme's 1984 book The Bone People was set in an isolated area on the coast of the South Island and explores themes of isolation and community. The Luminaries, a novel by Eleanor Catton which won the Booker Prize for 2013, is set on the West Coast during the 19th-century gold rush period. The Denniston Rose (2003) and its sequel Heart of Coal (2004) by Jenny Pattrick, set on the harsh and isolated Denniston Plateau, are two of New Zealand's best-selling novels. Hokitika Town (2011) by Charlotte Randall is a novel told from the point of view of a Māori boy hanging around the pubs of Hokitika in 1865.

The dramatic landscapes of the South Island have made it a popular location for the production of several films, including The Lord of the Rings trilogy and The Chronicles of Narnia: The Lion, the Witch and the Wardrobe.

=== Language ===
Southland and the very southernmost areas of Otago near the border with Southland are known for the people there speaking with what is often referred to as the "Southland burr", a semi-rhotic, Scottish-influenced accent of the English language.

The South Island dialect of the Māori language has a few notable differences from standard Māori, especially in the far south of the island. Particularly noticeable is the replacement of the ng sound with a hard k. Other features include a more rolled r sound (which is sometimes rendered as an l), and a tendency for final vowels to be softened to a schwa or, in extreme cases dropped entirely. This results in place-names such as The Kilmog and Lake Waihola, which would be rendered as Kirimoko and Waihora respectively further north. Despite the dialect being regarded as extinct, its use in signage and official documentation is encouraged by many government and educational agencies in the southern part of the island.

=== Religion ===
Just over half the population identified as 'no religion' in the 2023 census.

Anglicanism is the largest Christian denomination in the South Island with 12.7 percent affiliating as of 2023. Anglicanism is strongest in Canterbury, the city of Christchurch having been founded as an Anglican settlement.

Catholicism still has a noticeably strong presence on the West Coast, where many of the early settlers were Catholic Irish miners, and in Kaikōura. The territorial authorities with the highest proportion of Catholics are Kaikōura (where they are 18.4% of the total population), Westland (18.3%), and Grey (17.8%).

Presbyterianism is strong in the lower South Island – the city of Dunedin was founded as a Presbyterian settlement, and many of the early settlers in the region were Scottish Presbyterians. The territorial authorities with the highest proportion of Presbyterians are Gore (where they were 30.9% of the total population in 2013), Clutha District (30.7%), and Southland (29.8%).

The first Muslims in New Zealand were a few Chinese gold diggers working in the Dunstan gold fields of Otago in the 1860s.

== Governance ==
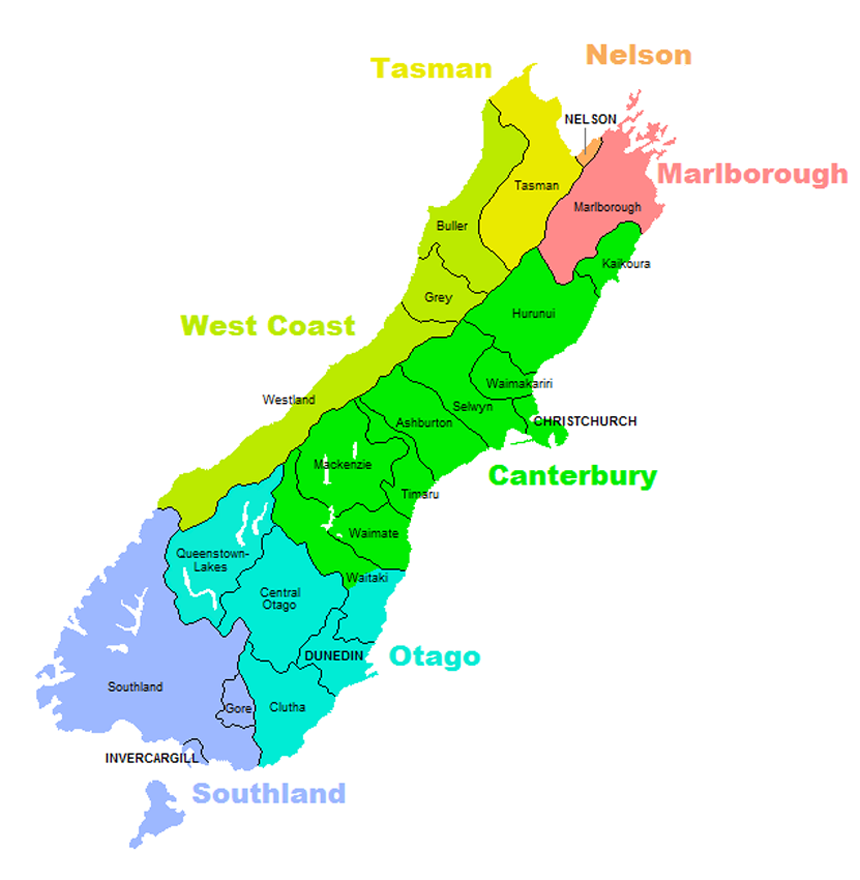
Regions and territorial authority districts

The South Island has sixteen general electorates (by law) and one Māori electorate (by quota) in the New Zealand House of Representatives. Local government functions as it does in the rest of the country, with regional matters handled by regional councils and more local matters by territorial authorities. In the upper part of the island, the territorial authorities of Nelson, Tasman, and Marlborough also handle regional functions, existing as unitary authorities. There are four regional councils (being West Coast, Canterbury, Otago, and Southland) and 23 territorial authorities.

=== Independence movements ===
Secession movements have surfaced several times in the South Island. A Premier of New Zealand, Sir Julius Vogel, was amongst the first people to make this call, which was voted on by the New Zealand Parliament as early as 1865. The desire for the South Island to form a separate colony was one of the main factors in moving the capital of New Zealand from Auckland to Wellington that year.

Several South Island nationalist groups emerged at the end of the 20th century and beginning of the 21st. The South Island Party fielded candidates in the 1999 general election but cancelled its registration in 2002. Several internet-based groups advocate their support for greater self-determination.

== Economy ==
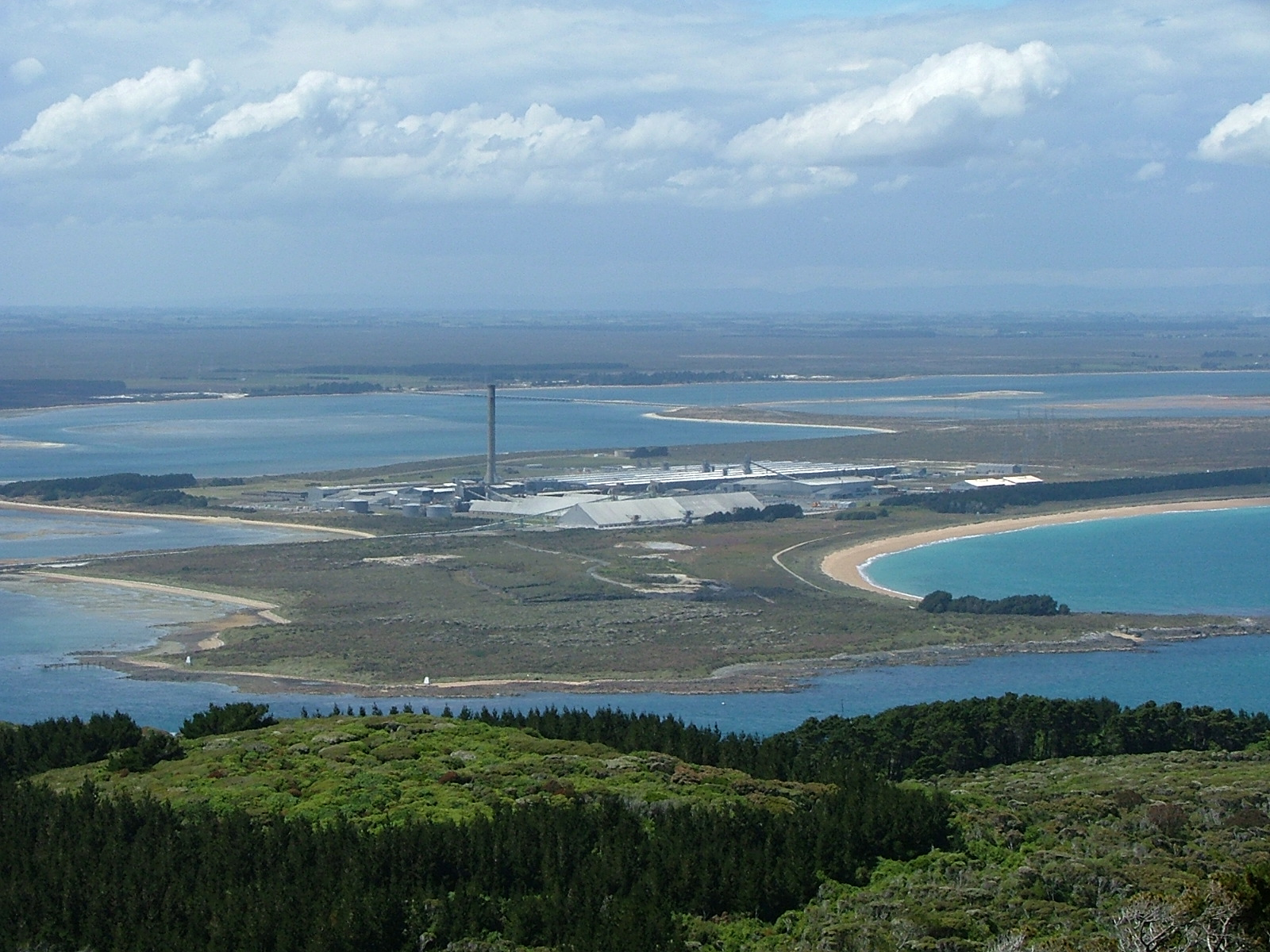
The Tiwai Point Aluminium Smelter near Bluff

The South Island economy is strongly focused on tourism and primary industries like agriculture. The other main industry groups are manufacturing, mining, construction, energy supply, education, health and community services.

The subnational gross domestic product (GDP) of the South Island was estimated at NZ$78.94 billion in the year to March 2022, 21.9% of New Zealand's national GDP. The subnational GDP per capita was estimated at $65,875 in the same period.

=== Energy ===
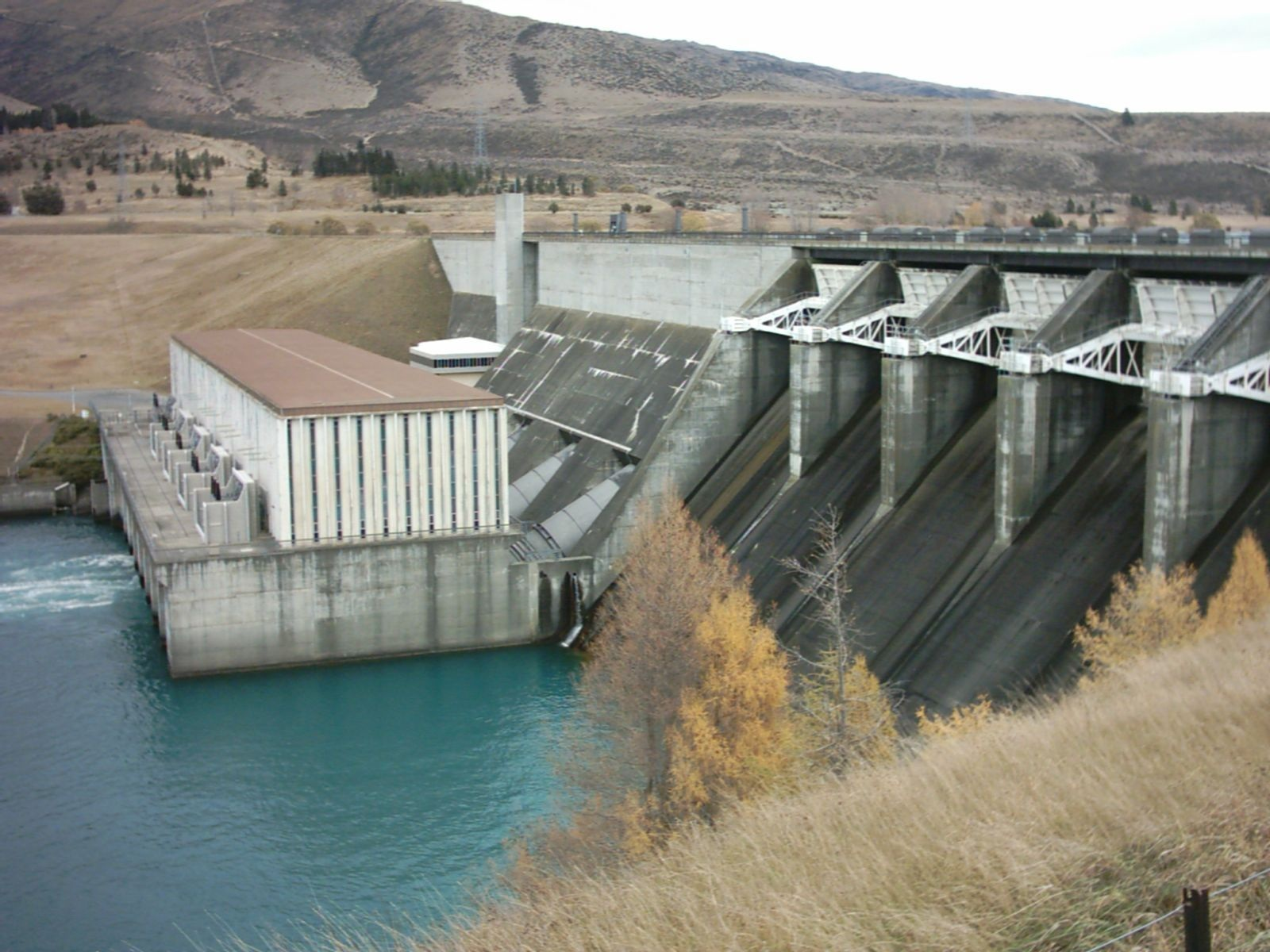
The Aviemore Dam, the penultimate hydro station on the Waitaki River hydro scheme

The South Island is a major centre for electricity generation, especially in the southern half of the island, and especially from hydroelectricity. In 2010, the island generated 18.01 TWh of electricity, 41.5% of New Zealand's total electricity generation. Nearly all (98.7%) of the island's electricity is generated by hydroelectricity, primarily from the Waitaki, Clutha, and Manapouri schemes, with most of the remainder coming from wind generation. While the majority of electricity is consumed within the island, a significant percentage is exported to the North Island via the HVDC Inter-Island link.

=== Tourism ===
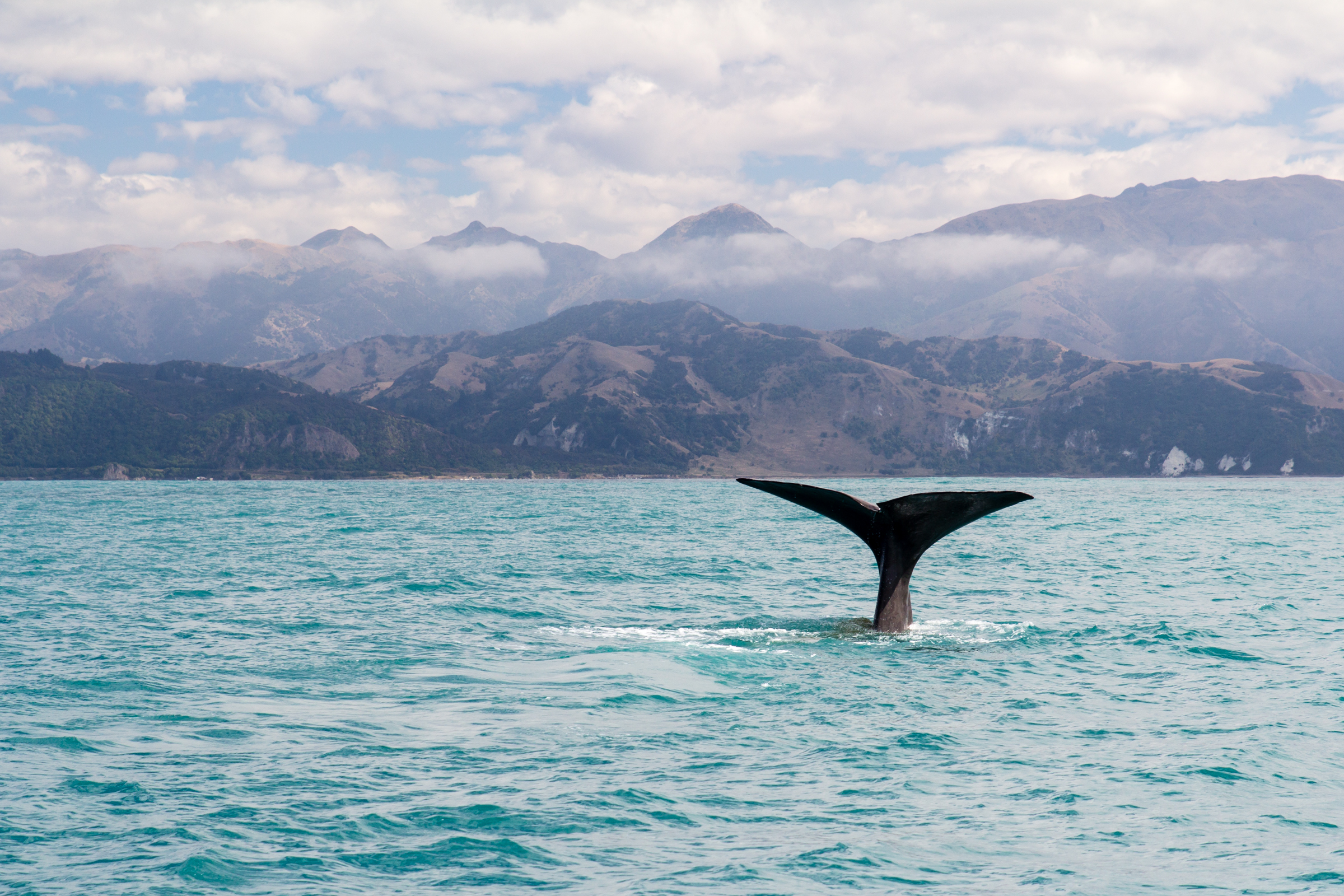
Whale watching in Kaikōura

Tourism is a huge earner for the South Island. Popular tourist activities include sightseeing, adventure tourism, such as glacier climbing and Bungee jumping, tramping (hiking), kayaking, and camping. Numerous walking and hiking paths, including six of the New Zealand Great Walks, are located in the South Island and are renowned internationally.

Fiordland National Park, Abel Tasman National Park, Westland Tai Poutini National Park, Aoraki / Mount Cook National Park, Queenstown, Kaikōura, and the Marlborough Sounds are regarded as the main tourism destinations in the South Island and amongst the Top 10 destinations in New Zealand.

Most of New Zealand's ski areas and resorts are located in the South Island.

== Transport ==
South Island rail network map

The South Island has a state highway network of 4,921 kilometres (3,058 mi). SH 1 extends down the east coast of the South Island from Picton via Christchurch, Dunedin and Invercargill to Stirling Point, one kilometre south of Bluff. A section of the highway north of Kaikōura was closed from 14 November 2016 to 15 December 2017 due to damage from the 2016 Kaikōura earthquake. SH6 extends from Blenheim (splitting from SH1) across the top of the island through Nelson, then down the West Coast and across the Southern Alps to Otago and south to Invercargill, where it rejoins SH1.

The South Island's railway network has two main lines, two secondary lines, and a few branch lines. The Main North Line from Picton to Christchurch and the Main South Line from Lyttelton to Invercargill via Dunedin together constitute the South Island Main Trunk Railway. The secondary Midland Line branches from the Main South Line in Rolleston and passes through the Southern Alps via the Otira Tunnel to the West Coast and its terminus in Greymouth. In Stillwater, it meets the other secondary route, the Stillwater - Westport Line.

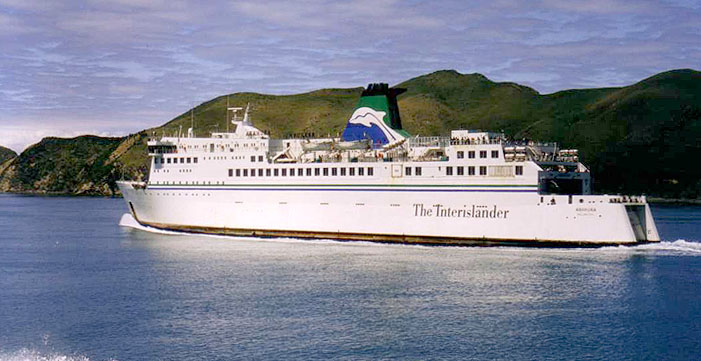
The Interislander Arahura in the Marlborough Sounds

Commuter and long-distance passenger train services were once extensive, but commuter services were cancelled during the late 1960s to early 1980s due to financial losses. Regional passenger trains are now limited to the Coastal Pacific from Christchurch to Picton and the TranzAlpine from Christchurch to Greymouth. The Southerner between Christchurch and Invercargill, once the flagship of the network, was cancelled in 2002. It ran for a few days in 2025 as a tourist excursion, and in 2026 a similar tourist service named The Mainlander operated occasionally. The architecturally significant Dunedin Railway Station is used by Dunedin Railways (formerly Taieri Gorge Railway) tourist trains: the Taieri Gorge Limited along the Otago Central Railway and the Seasider to Palmerston.

The South Island is separated from the North Island by Cook Strait, which is 24 kilometres (15 miles) wide at its narrowest point, and requires a 70-kilometre (43-mile) ferry trip to cross, a trip of between three and three and a half hours. Regular roll-on/roll-off ferry services across Cook Strait between Wellington and Picton are operated by two companies: Interislander (a division of KiwiRail), and Bluebridge (Strait Shipping). One Interislander ferry is a rail ferry capable of transporting both road and rail on separate decks. The other ferries carry passengers and road vehicles only. Container ports operate at Bluff, Lyttelton (Christchurch), Port Chalmers (Dunedin), Nelson and Timaru.

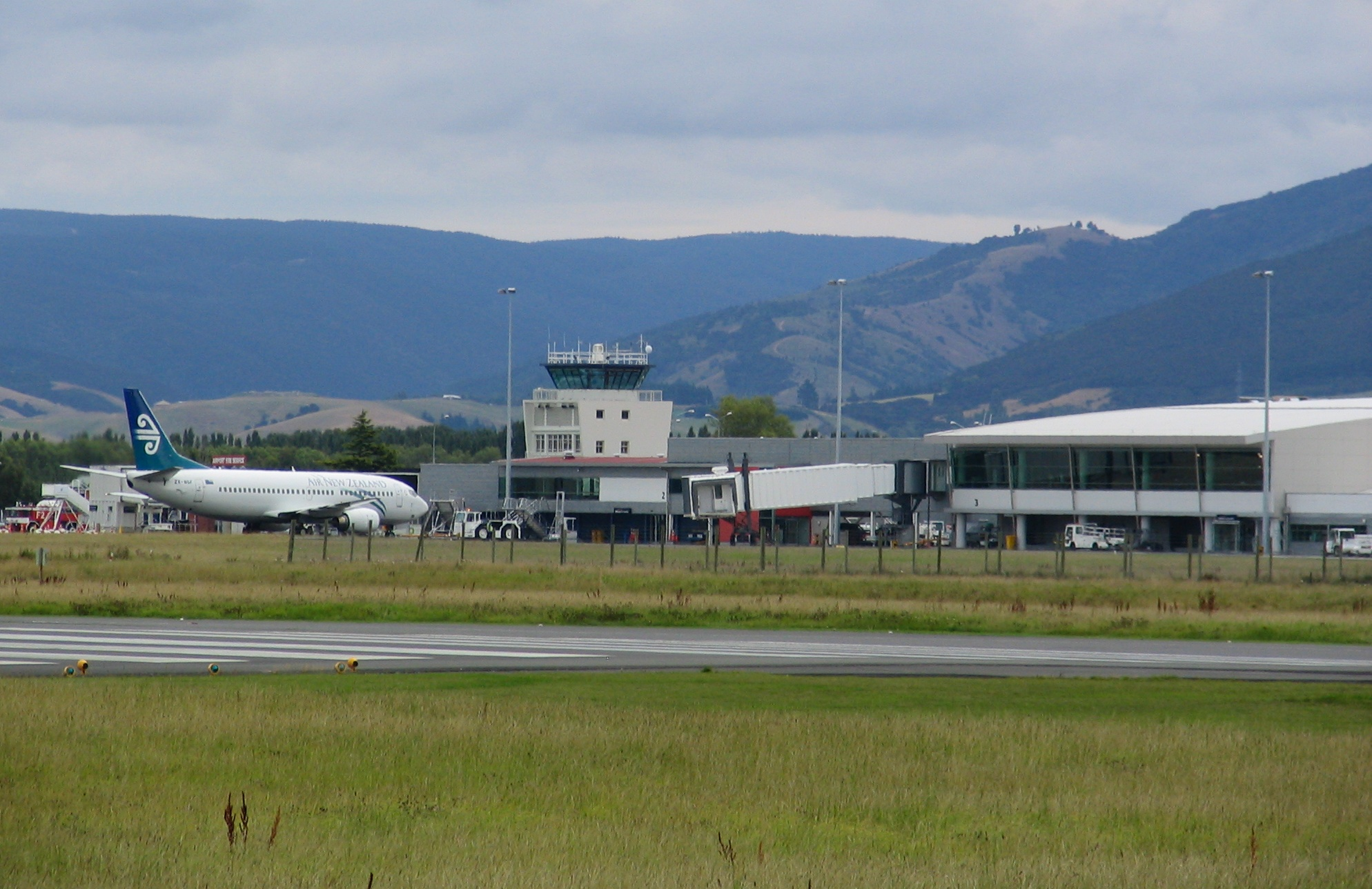
Dunedin International Airport control tower and terminal building, 2009

The main airport in the South Island is Christchurch Airport, which handles international and domestic flights as well as flights to the Chatham Islands and Antarctica. Some international services operate from Dunedin Airport and Queenstown Airport.

== See also ==
- List of military units based in or affiliated with the South Island
- Nor'west arch
