= Hāwea Conservation Park =

Protected area in New Zealand

- Location within New Zealand
- Location: South Island, New Zealand
- Nearest town: Wānaka
- Coordinates: 44.29°S 169.41°E
- Area: 105,260.92 hectares (260,105.4 acres)
- Governing body: Department of Conservation

The Hāwea Conservation Park is a protected area in the South Island of New Zealand. It was created in September 2008 from land that previously had a number of separate tenures.

The majority of the land forming the park was public conservation land but some previously unallocated Crown land and land from the tenure review process also formed part of the park. The park covers an area of 105,261 ha (260,110 acres) around the northern part of Lake Hāwea.

The Department of Conservation administers the land.

American media personality Matt Lauer has blocked public access to the conservation park through his leasehold on the Hunter Station farm.

== See also ==
- Protected areas of New Zealand
