= Credit (Repossession) Act 1997 =

Act of Parliament in New Zealand

New Zealand Parliament
- Long title: An Act to govern the taking of possession of consumer goods by a creditor under a security agreement
- Royal assent: 14 November 1997
- Commenced: 1 July 1998

Repealed by
- Credit Contracts and Consumer Finance Amendment Act 2014
- Status: Repealed

The Credit (Repossession) Act 1997 was an act that regulated repossessions in New Zealand. This Act replaced the limited repossession sections in the Hire Purchase Act 1971. The Act outlined the rights of the debtor, the steps required for repossession, the creditors right of entry, as well as the steps the creditor must take once they have repossessed goods. When the Act was passed, it gave protection to all goods subject to a hire purchase agreement, but it was amended in 1999 to limit its protection to only the purchase of consumer goods. It was repealed by the Credit Contracts and Consumer Finance Amendment Act of 2014.

== Steps required for repossession ==
Part 2 of the Act details what steps a creditor must first take before they can lawfully repossess goods, with the main criterion being that the debtor must be in default under the security agreement normally for nonpayment).

If the debtor is in default, the creditor must then give notice to the debtor of the default, which is in the form of what is called a pre-possession notice.

And finally, the creditor must allow the debtor time to remedy the default, which cannot be a less than 15 days from the date the pre-possession notice was served on the debtor.

If the creditor breaches any of these rules, they risk a fine of up to $3,000.

== Creditors Right of Entry ==
When a creditor repossesses goods, they must not enter the debtor's residence in an unreasonable manner, nor can they enter residential premises at a prohibited time, which is outside the hours of 6 a.m. to 9 p.m. and at any time on a Sunday or a public holiday.

Also, the Act disqualifies certain convicted criminals from acting as repossession agents s, such as anyone convicted of a violent or dishonesty offence in the previous 5 years, anyone released from prison within the previous 12 months, and all people sentenced to jail terms of 10 years or more.

On the other side of the coin, if someone wilfully and forcibly (i.e., needs to actually use physical force against the repossession agent) obstructs the legal repossession of goods, they risks a conviction and a fine of up to $10,000.

== Steps the creditor must take once they have repossessed goods ==
Once goods have been repossessed, the creditor must issue a post-possession notice, in the form prescribed in Schedule 2 of the Act, and serve it on the debtor within 21 days of the repossession. Failure to do so means that the creditor is not allowed to recover the costs of repossession from the debtor.

Once the goods are repossessed, the debtor has 15 days from the date the Post Possession Notice was served to either reinstate the security agreement, settle the security agreement in full, or introduce a buyer for a price no less than the valuation on the Post Possession Notice.

After this period, the creditor can sell the goods, unless the goods are perishable, where the creditor can sell the goods straight away; otherwise, the creditor cannot claim any repossession shortfall from the debtor.

The creditor must use all reasonable efforts to obtain the best price for the sale of the repossessed goods, and if the goods are being sold by either public auction or public tender, the creditor must give the debtor reasonable notice of the time and place of the proposed auction, plus any reserve price that may have been set.

Within 10 days following the sale of the goods, the creditor must give the debtor a statement of account (often referred to as an Account After Sale) outlining any shortfall and how this amount is calculated.

This creditor cannot legally recover any more from the debtor than this shortfall amount, which would prevent the creditor from adding other fees such as debt collection fees, legal fees, etc.

== Other Repossession Law ==
Unfortunately, the Act does not incorporate all of the repossession law, with the main other law being that a creditor cannot repossess goods that have been sold to a third party which were either sold by a dealer or that were worth less than $2,000 when the security agreement was originally entered into.
