= Ahuriri Conservation Park =

Protected area in Canterbury, New Zealand

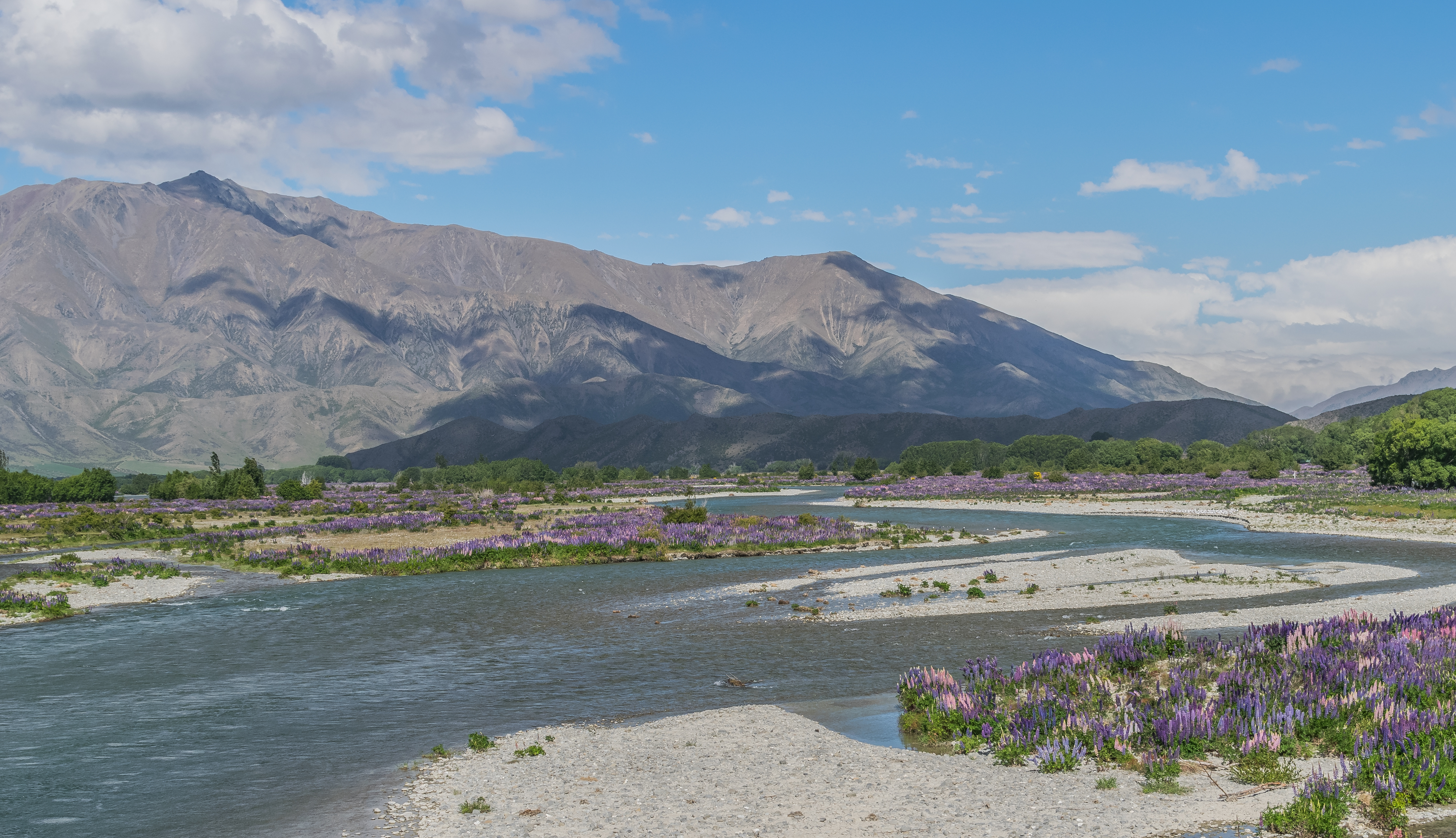
- Ahuriri Valley, as viewed from Omarama

- Location within New Zealand
- Location: Canterbury Region, New Zealand
- Nearest city: Christchurch
- Coordinates: 44°20′S 169°40′E
- Area: 49 hectares (120 acres)
- Established: 2004
- Governing body: Department of Conservation

Ahuriri Conservation Park is a protected area of 49,000 hectares including tussock grasslands, forest, and river habitat, located in Canterbury, South Island, New Zealand, and centred around the headwaters of the Ahuriri River.

The park includes trails and huts. The mountains, forests, tussock lands and river valleys are used for tramping, fishing kayaking, horse riding and hunting.

Both the park and neighbouring Ben Avon Station are located near the Aoraki Mackenzie International Dark Sky Reserve, a dark-sky preserve, and are used for astronomy.

The town is serviced by the tourist town of Omarama.

== History ==
The park was established in 2005, and includes the Birchwood Station leasehold farm the New Zealand Government bought back for NZ$10 million in 2004. It contained extensive wetlands that had remained largely undeveloped. Birchwood Station continued normal farming operations until the end of the leasehold in 2010.

The road to the former Birchwood Station homestead stopped being regularly maintained by Waitaki District Council in 2011.

In 2014, ecologist Peter Espie reported a decrease in native plant species in the park, and suggested introducing grazing management.

Parts of the 2020 Disney film Mulan were filmed in the Ahuriri Valley near the conservation park, including the training camp scenes and some battle scenes.

== See also ==
- Conservation parks of New Zealand
