= Tenure review in the South Island =

Tenure review is a process of reviewing the leasehold tenure of some high country land in the South Island of New Zealand. It currently involves 20% of the South Island or 10% of the total land area of New Zealand. Tenure review began with the passing of the Crown Pastoral Land Act 1998.

Historically, much of the high country area has been grazed by sheep and cattle. From the mid-1930s to the mid-1980s, about 27% of New Zealand's land area was either leased or licensed from the Crown. In the South Island pastoral farming relied on Crown leasehold land. About one-fifth of the occupied land in Otago was freehold. In Canterbury, about two-fifths of occupied land was freehold.

In 2006, Lincoln University lecturer Ann Brower argued that the process is in favour of the lessees rather than the government.

In 2008, the Parliamentary Commissioner for the Environment carried out an investigation into tenure review. A number of recommendations were made, including the establishment of a High Country Commission for a fixed period of time in order to address issues involving the high country.

== See also ==
- Agriculture in New Zealand
- Station (New Zealand agriculture)
