= Crown Pastoral Land Act 1998 =

Act of Parliament in New Zealand

Crown Pastoral Land Act

New Zealand Parliament
- Long title: An Act — (a) To establish a system for reviewing the tenure of Crown land held under certain perpetually renewable leases; and (b) To establish a system for determining how Crown land formerly held under pastoral occupation licence, and certain other Crown land, should be dealt with; and (c) Otherwise to provide for the administration of Crown pastoral land
- Royal assent: 23 June 1998

Legislative history
- Introduced by: National Party
- Passed: 1998
- Status: Current legislation

The Crown Pastoral Land Act is an act of Parliament in New Zealand.

The act provides for the process of tenure review of leasehold land holdings in the high country of the South Island.

== See also ==
- List of statutes of New Zealand (1990–1999)
- Agriculture in New Zealand
- Station (New Zealand agriculture)
