= Geothermal power in New Zealand =

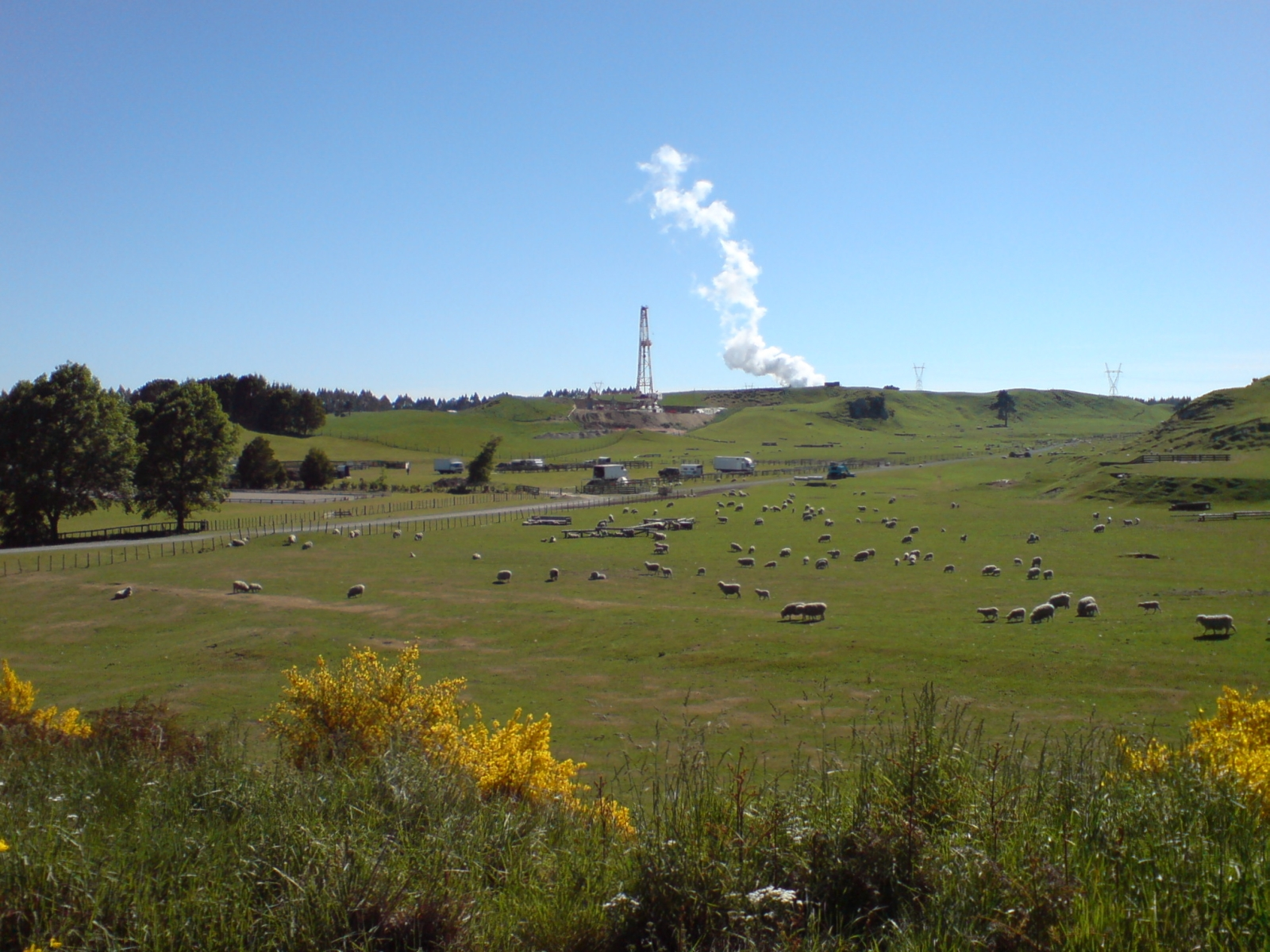
New geothermal drilling north of Taupō (2007)

Geothermal power in New Zealand plays a significant part of the energy generation capacity of the country, constituting 25% of the total energy supply and 19% of electricity production in 2021. This positions New Zealand as the top user of geothermal energy among International Energy Agency (IEA) countries in both total energy supply and electricity generation.

Geothermal energy constitutes New Zealand's second-largest renewable electricity source, with the North Island estimated to have a potential of 1,000 MW for power generation. However, full exploitation may be constrained by economic, environmental, and social considerations. Exploration in the South Island has revealed geothermal prospects beneath the Alpine Fault, yet the Institute of Geological and Nuclear Science (GNS) suggests these resources are likely minor, suited more for small-scale direct use than for extensive electricity generation.

Geothermal energy has been described as New Zealand's most reliable renewable energy source, above wind, solar and even hydroelectricity, due to its lack of dependence on the weather. It has also been described as the currently (2000s and 2010s) most attractive new source of energy for New Zealand, as petrochemical fuel prices rise and easy hydro power sites have been tapped - it has been estimated that another 1000MW of geothermal resource can be used for generating electricity.

== Electricity generation ==
In 2021, New Zealand generated a total of 45 TWh of electricity, with renewable energy sources contributing 81%, or 36 TWh. Among these, geothermal energy stood out by providing 19%. Over the period from 2005 to 2021, there has been a consistent increase in the share of renewable energy in electricity production. Specifically, the use of geothermal sources for generating electricity saw a substantial rise, growing by 165% during this period. It is projected that by 2035, 15-19% of New Zealand's electricity will come from geothermal energy.

== Geothermal fields ==
The exploration of New Zealand's geothermal fields has been very extensive, and by the 1980s, most fields were considered mapped, with 129 found, of which 14 are in the 70-140 °C range, 7 in the 140-220 °C range and 15 in the >220 °C range. Currently, some potential new geothermal fields are being surveyed that have no surface expression.

New Zealand's high-temperature geothermal fields are mostly concentrated around the Taupō Volcanic Zone (which also has most of the currently operating generation capacity), in the central North Island, with another major field at Ngawha Springs in Northland. However, more systems (some of them potentially exploitable) are scattered all over the country, from the Hauraki Plains to the Bay of Plenty to numerous hot springs in the South Island, most of them associated with faults and other tectonic features.

Many applications of geothermal energy in New Zealand reinject the cooled steam / fluid back into the underground fields, to extend or infinitely use the fields as power sources.

== History ==
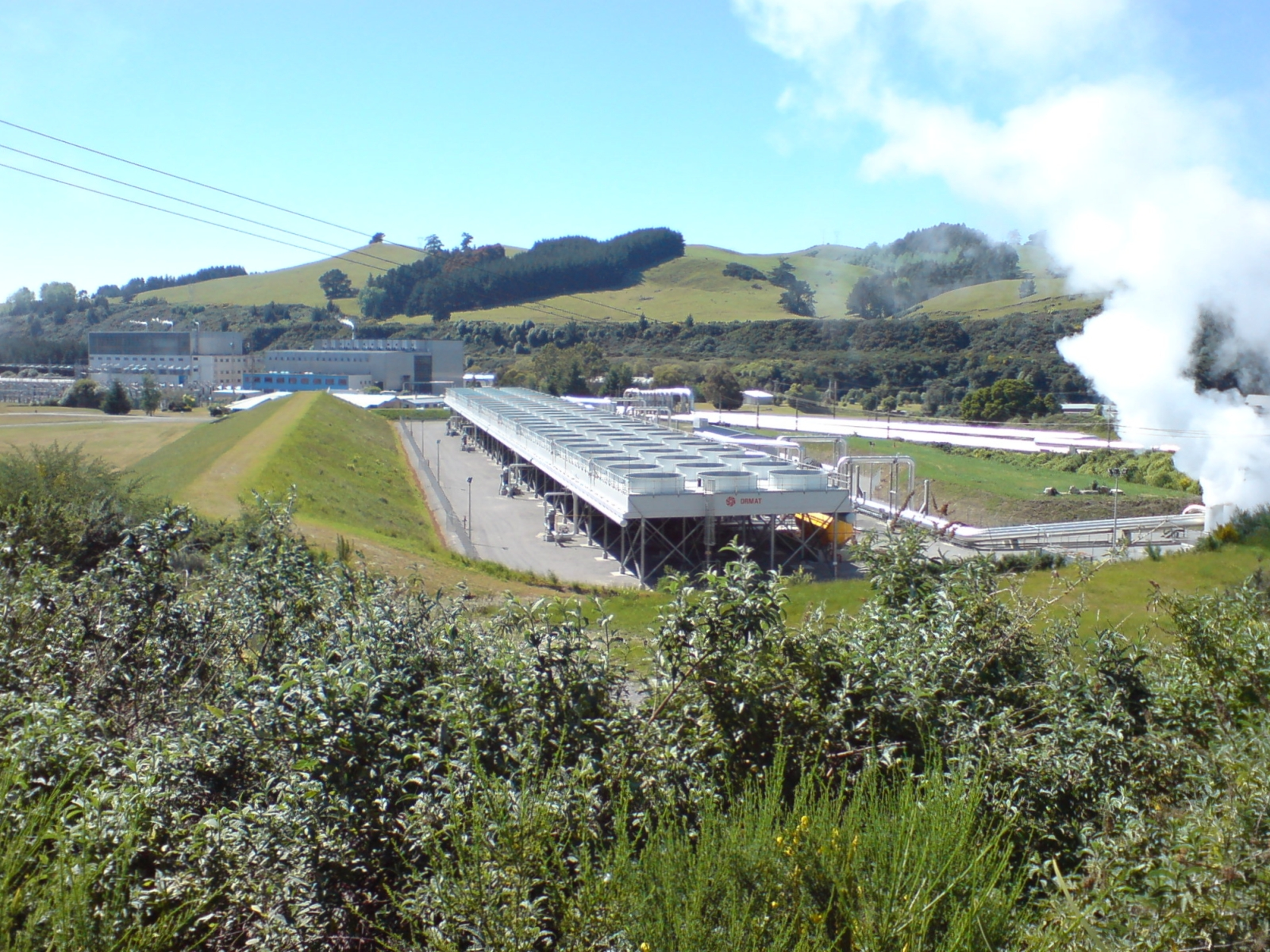
The Wairakei geothermal power plant

Geothermal energy use in New Zealand is strongly tied to Wairakei, where the first geothermal plant was opened in 1958. At that time, it was only the second large-scale plant existing worldwide (the first being the Valle del Diavolo 'Devil's Valley' plant in Larderello, Italy opened in 1911). Several new plants and efficiency-enhancing second-stage equipment have been added since, though there is also some loss of steam generation due to the decade-long drawdown. Some plants are therefore capped in steam extraction volumes to allow the fields to regenerate, and a percentage of the steam/water is reinjected.

The Mokai and Rotokawa geothermal plant was the first to come into operation via a resource consent applied for and issued under the Resource Management Act. The 5 years up until 2016 saw a number of new power stations completed. Kawarau 90MW, Nga Awa Purua 140MW, Ngatamariki 80MW and Te Mihi 140MW.

For over six decades, geothermal energy has been a key component of New Zealand's electricity landscape, with the majority of its facilities situated in the Taupō Volcanic Zone. Looking ahead, it is projected that by 2030, the electricity generated from geothermal sources in New Zealand will reach approximately 10.3 terawatt-hours (TWh).

== Research ==
Considerable geothermal research expertise exists at New Zealand's Crown Research Institutes and universities. In particular, at GNS Science, Industrial Research Limited, and the Geothermal Program at the University of Auckland. New Zealand is also one of the partner nations of the International Partnership for Energy development in Island Nations (EDIN). As part of EDIN, New Zealand is involved in international research projects to evaluate and increase geothermal power generation domestically as well as in 18 Pacific Island nations.

== Laws and regulations ==
Geothermal Energy Act 1953

The Geothermal Energy Act 1953 was made redundant by the Resource Management Act 1991 (RMA). The Geothermal Energy Act granted water rights, which have generally been replaced by RMA resource consents.

Geothermal Energy Regulations 1961

The Geothermal Energy Regulations 1961 define the role of "geothermal inspectors" and specify processes for applications for authorities and licences.

Rotorua City Geothermal Energy Empowering Act 1967

The Rotorua City Geothermal Energy Empowering Act 1967 is an Act to enable the Rotorua City Council to make provisions for the control of the tapping and use of geothermal energy in the city of Rotorua.

Resource Management Act 1991

The Resource Management Act 1991 (RMA) is a significant, and at times, controversial Act of Parliament passed in 1991. The RMA regulates access to natural and physical resources such as land, air and water, with sustainable use of these resources being the overriding goal. New Zealand's Ministry for the Environment describes the RMA as New Zealand's principal legislation for environmental management.

The Resource Management Act is the principal legislation controlling the use of geothermal resources in New Zealand. The New Zealand Geothermal Association considers the procedures which are currently being adopted under the RMA as the single largest obstacle to further geothermal development, holding that "the regulatory process leads to long delays which impose a significant up-front cost on projects, reducing their financial viability".

== List of geothermal power stations ==
Name	Location	Field	Operator	Capacity (MW)	Annual Generation (average GWh)	Commissioned
Kawerau (TAOM) - Te Ahi O Maui	West of Kawerau, Bay of Plenty	Kawerau	Eastland Generation	28	208	2018
Kawerau (GDL) - Geothermal Development Limited	Kawerau, Bay of Plenty	Kawerau	Eastland Generation	8.3	70	2008
Kawerau (TOPP1)	Kawerau, Bay of Plenty	Kawerau	Eastland Generation	25	210	2012
Kawerau (TOPP2)	Kawerau, Bay of Plenty	Kawerau	Eastland Generation	49		2025
Kawerau (KGL)	Kawerau, Bay of Plenty	Kawerau	Mercury	100	800	2008
Mokai	northwest of Taupō	Mokai	Mercury	112	900	2000
Nga Awa Purua	north of Taupō	Rotokawa	Mercury	149	1100	2010
Ngatamariki	north of Taupō	Ngatamariki	Mercury	128	670	2013, 2025
Ngāwhā	near Kaikohe, Northland	Ngawha	Top Energy	57	78	1998, 2020
Ohaaki	between Rotorua and Taupō	Ohaaki	Contact Energy	44	300	1989
Poihipi	north of Taupō	Wairakei	Contact Energy	40	350	1997
Rotokawa	north of Taupō	Rotokawa	Mercury	28	210	1997
Tauhara - Stage 2	north of Taupō	Tauhara	Contact Energy	173	Unknown	2024
Te Huka (Tauhara Stage 1)	north of Taupō	Tauhara	Contact Energy	79		2010, 2024
Te Mihi	north of Taupō	Wairakei	Contact Energy	166	1200 (approx)	2014
Wairakei	north of Taupō	Wairakei	Contact Energy	161	1310	1958, 2005

=== Under construction ===
Geothermal development projects are Te Mihi Stage 2a which is a partial replacement for Wairakei.

Name	Location	Field	Operator	Capacity (MW)	Expected Commissioning Date
Te Mihi Stage 2a	north of Taupo	Wairakei	Contact Energy	101.4	Q3 2027

=== Proposed ===
Name	Location	Field	Operator / Owner	Capacity (MW)	Development Stage
Taheke	Okere, Bay of Plenty	Taheke	Eastland Generation / Taheke 8C	35	Consented (2023)
Ngawha Unit 5	near Kaikohe, Northland	Ngawha	Top Energy	32	Consented
Tauhara 2	Taupo	Tauhara	Contact Energy	50	Planned. FID due 2027
Tauhara 3	Taupo	Tauhara	Contact Energy	100	Planned

=== Decommissioned ===
Name	Location	Field	Operator	Capacity (MW)	Annual Generation (average GWh)	Commissioned	Decommissioned
Kawerau TA3	Kawerau	Kawerau	Tasman Mill. Later Norske Skog Tasman (NST)	8	Unknown	1966	2004
Kawerau TG1 & TG2	Kawerau	Kawerau	Bay of Plenty Energy (later Nova Energy)	6.4	35	TG 1989. TG2 1993	TG1 was decommissioned in 2014. TG2 was decommissioned in 2017.

== See also ==
- Energy in New Zealand
- Electricity sector in New Zealand
- Geothermal areas in New Zealand
- Renewable energy commercialisation
- Solar power in New Zealand
- Wind power in New Zealand
- Ocean power in New Zealand
- Biofuel in New Zealand
- Hydroelectric power in New Zealand
- Solar hot water in New Zealand
- Renewable energy in New Zealand
- Renewable energy by country
