= Top Energy =

New Zealand electricity generator company

Top Energy Te Puna Hihiko
- Industry: Electricity distribution, electricity generation
- Predecessor: Bay of Islands Electric Power
- Founded: 1935
- Headquarters: Kerikeri, New Zealand
- Key people: Richard Krogh (Chair); Russell Shaw (CEO)
- Number of employees: 160
- Parent: Top Energy Consumer Trust
- Website: topenergy.co.nz

Ngāwhā Geothermal Power Station
- Country: New Zealand
- Location: Northland
- Coordinates: 35°25′03″S 173°51′07″E
- Status: Operational
- Commission date: 1998, 2008, 2020

Power generation
- Nameplate capacity: 32 MW

External links
- Website: topenergy.co.nz

Top Energy Limited is an electricity distribution and generation company based in Kerikeri, New Zealand. It owns and manages the electricity lines network in the Far North District of New Zealand, including Kaitaia, Kerikeri and Kaikohe. The service area covers 6,822 km^{2} and serves over 32,000 customers. It also owns and operates the Ngāwhā Geothermal Power Station.

== Ownership ==
Far North power consumers connected to Top Energy’s line network own the company, with the shares being held on their behalf by the Top Energy Consumer Trust.

== Distribution network ==
The Top Energy distribution network is connected to the national grid at Kaikohe substation.

=== Network statistics ===
Top Energy Limited network statistics for the year ending 31 March 2024
Parameter	Value
Regulatory asset base	$362 million
Line charge revenue	$43.5 million
Capital expenditure	$23.5 million
Operating expenditure	$23.5 million
Customer connections	34,094
Energy delivered	331 GWh
Peak demand	77 MW
Total line length	4,240 km
Distribution and low-voltage overhead lines	2,872 km
Distribution and low-voltage underground cables	956 km
Subtransmission lines and cables	414 km
Poles	37,120
Distribution transformers	6,311
Zone substation transformers	39
Average interruption duration (SAIDI)	698 minutes
Average interruption frequency (SAIFI)	5.66

== Ngāwhā Geothermal Power Stations ==
Top Energy owns and operates the Ngāwhā Geothermal Power Stations on the Ngawha geothermal field. They utilise binary cycle technology manufactured by Ormat Industries and produce a total of 56MW.

=== Ngawha A: 10 MW July 1998 (35°25'3"S 173°51'8"E) ===
The power station opened in 1998 with a generating capacity of about 8 MW. It was the first power station to come into operation via a resource consent applied for and issued under the Resource Management Act 1991.

=== Ngawha B: 15 MW August 2008 (35°25'3"S 173°52'4"E) ===
In 2008, the second plant was built, increasing the total capacity to 25 MW and allowing the power station to provide 70% of Northland's electricity.

Although the second power station is quite separate, the Electricity authority does not publish two separate data series, only one for their sum.

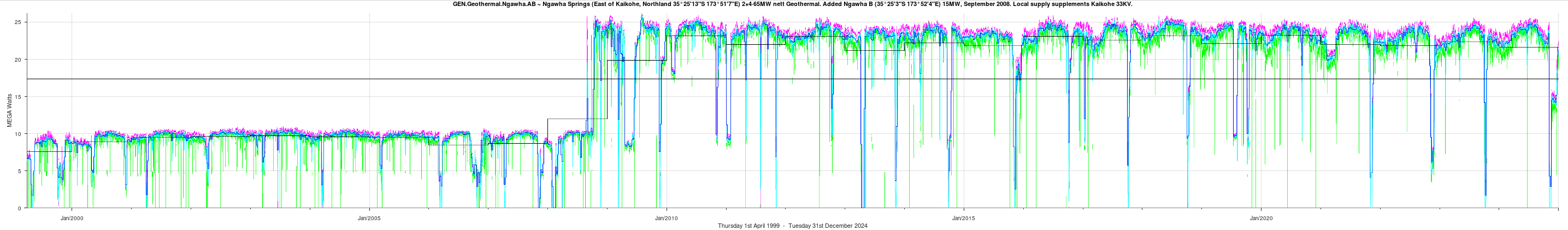
Electricity generation at Ngāwhā (A+B)

=== Ngawha C: 31·5 MW January 2021 (35°24'12"S 173°51'13"E) ===
In 2015, consents were granted for expansion with a further 50 MW of generation in two stages at a nearby site, with work beginning in late 2017. The first stage of the second expansion, generating an additional 32 MW was officially opened in July 2021. The stations now generate all the electricity the Far North needs for 97 per cent of the time. Rather than varying their generation to supply the varying local demand, they run at constant power with any surplus being sent to the national grid.

Unlike stations A and B that are south of Ngawha Springs, this station is north and is connected to the Kaikohe substation by a 110 KV transmission line, instead of the two 33 KV lines for the others.

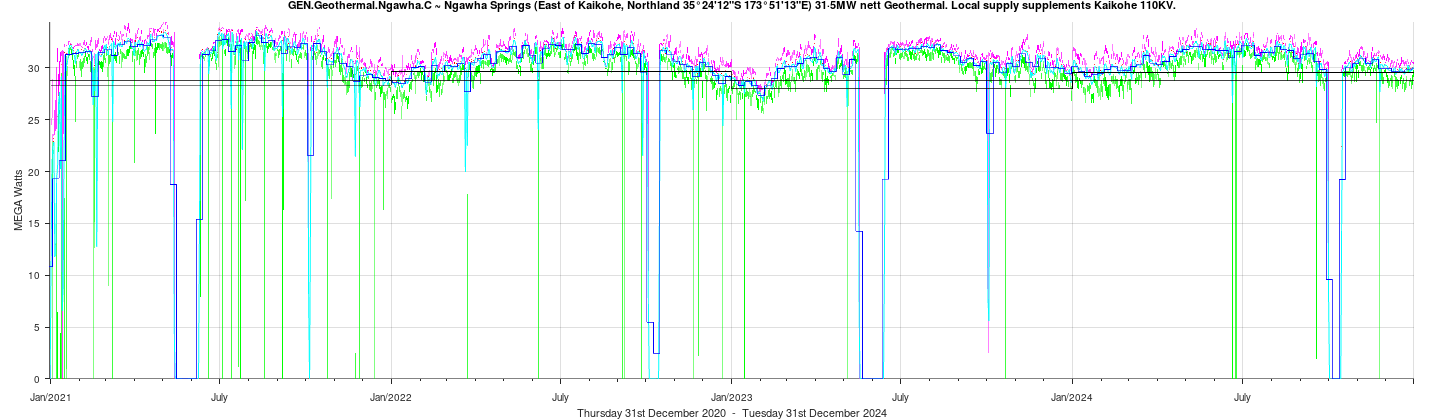
Electricity generation at Ngāwhā C

== See also ==
- Electricity sector in New Zealand
- Geothermal power in New Zealand
- List of power stations in New Zealand
