= Ōhakuri Dam =

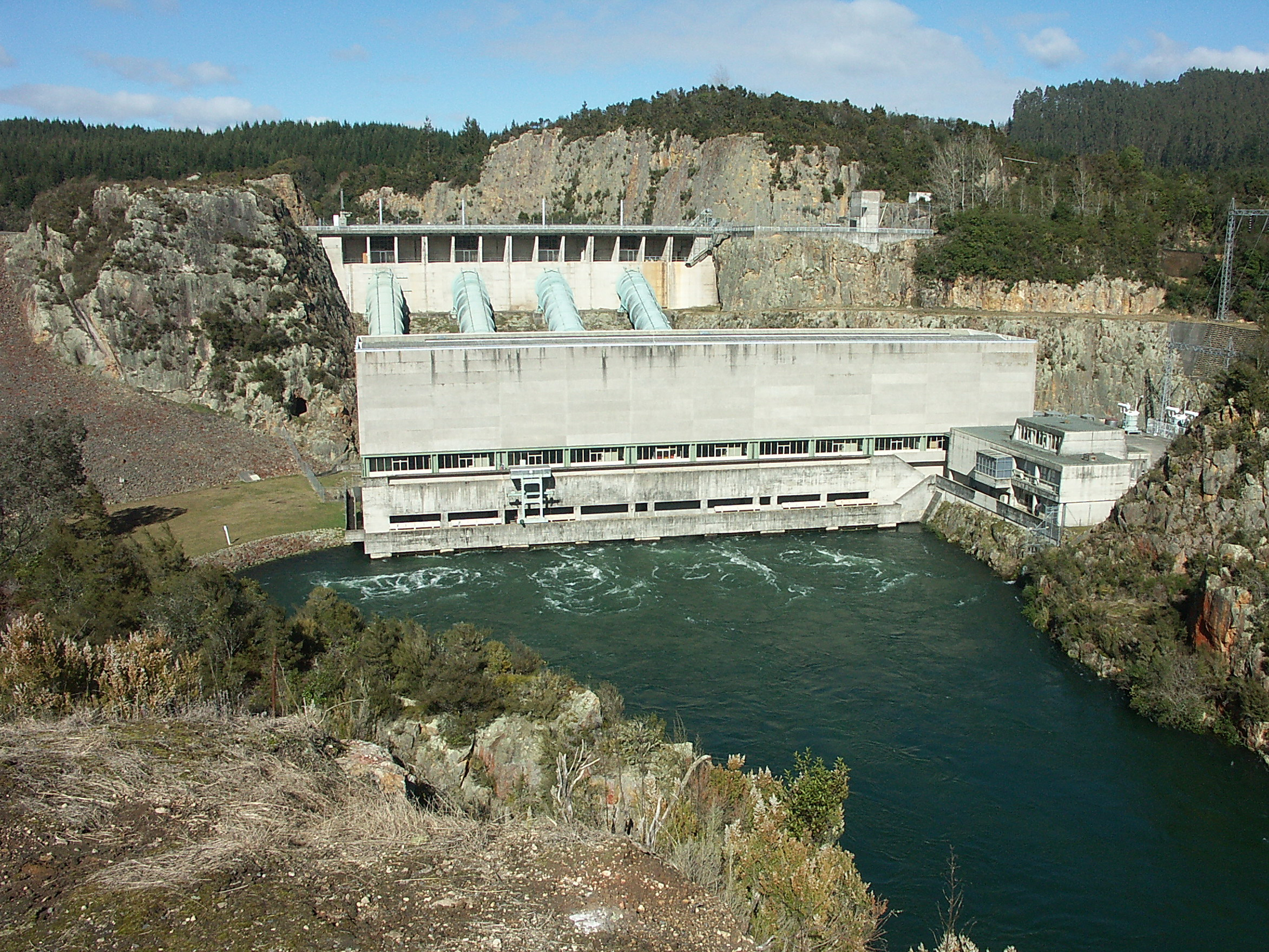
- Ōhakuri dam and powerhouse from the north.

- Location within New Zealand
- Country: New Zealand
- Location: Between Taupō, Rotorua, and Hamilton
- Coordinates: 38°24′30″S 176°5′22″E
- Purpose: Power
- Status: Operational
- Opening date: 1961
- Owner: Mercury Energy

Dam and spillways
- Type of dam: earth dam with concrete gravity sections for the intake and spillway structures
- Impounds: Waikato River

Reservoir
- Creates: Lake Ohakuri
- Surface area: 12 km^{2} (4.6 sq mi)

Ōhakuri Power Station
- Operator: Mercury Energy
- Turbines: 4× 28 MW Francis turbine
- Installed capacity: 112 MW (150,000 hp)

The Ōhakuri Dam is a dam and hydroelectric power station on the Waikato River, central North Island, New Zealand, midway between Taupō, Rotorua and Hamilton. Its dam is about 5 kilometres (3.1 mi) upstream of the Atiamuri Dam.

It was commissioned in 1961 and construction was organised from the 'hydro town' of Mangakino. The dam eventually created Lake Ohakuri, the largest artificial lake on the Waikato, which drowned two thirds of the Orakei Korako geothermal area as well as hot springs and wahi tapu (Māori sacred sites) at Te Ohaaki. Creation of the dam forced Ngāti Tahu to relocate their Ohaaki Marae. The submerged area also included Minginui Geyser and Orakei Korako Geyser, two of the world's largest geysers.

The construction in the face of these negative effects was considered justified at the time due to the serious electricity shortages plaguing the country after World War II, and by the fact that laws requiring public participation or consultation were not introduced until much later. While compensation to Māori land owners was paid based on the land take rules of the Public Works Act, the damage to the inhabitants of the area was to form basis of further legal actions under the Waitangi Tribunal legislation many years later.

== Power station ==
The Ōhakuri Power Station has a capacity of 112 megawatts (150,000 hp) and is operated by Mercury Energy.

== Gallery ==
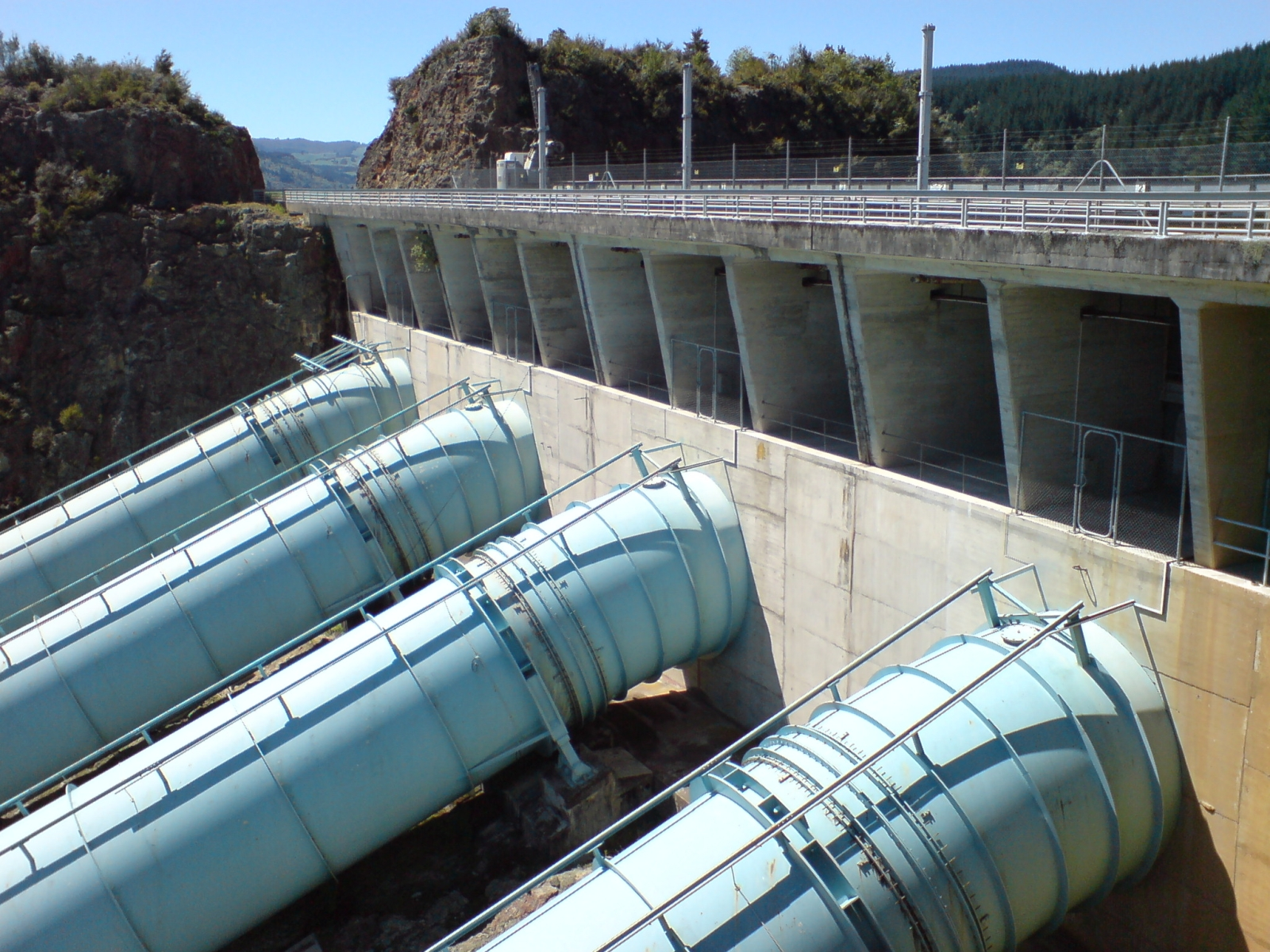
The penstocks seen from the west

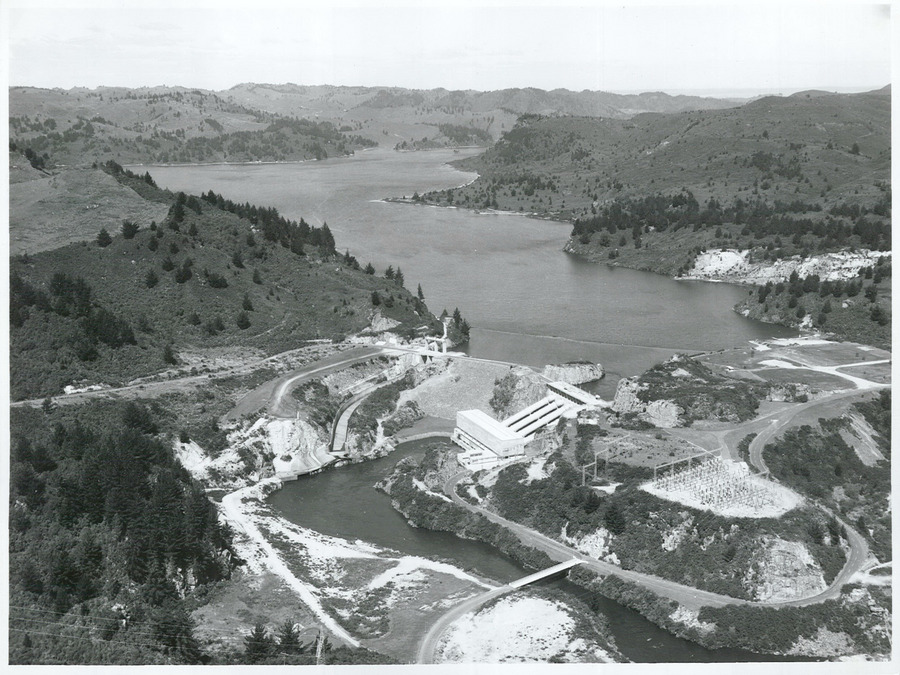
Aerial view of Ōhakuri Power Station, February 1969
