= Atiamuri Power Station =

Hydroelectric power station on the Waikato River in New Zealand

Ātiamuri Power Station
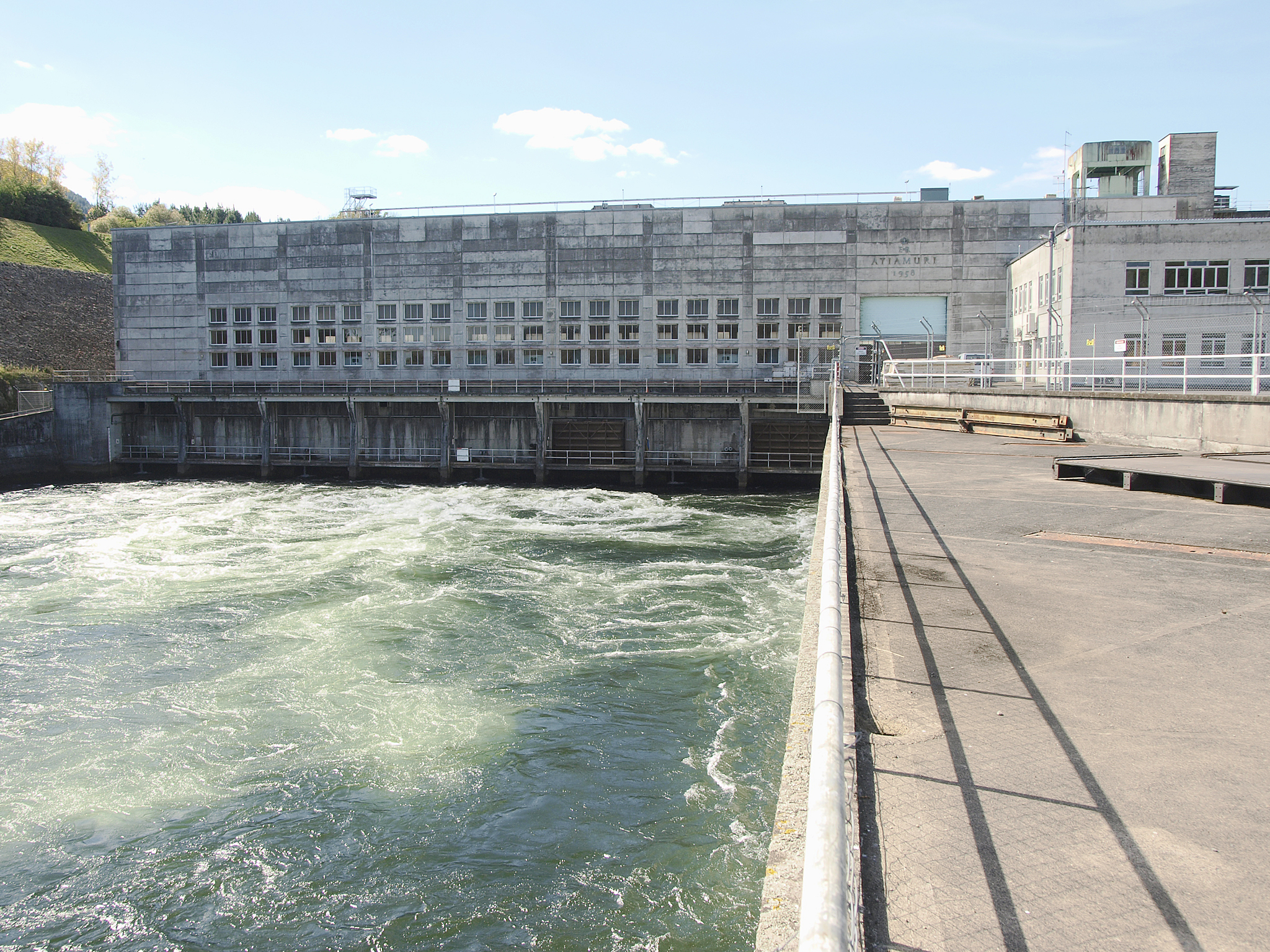
- Country: New Zealand
- Location: Lake Ātiamuri, Waikato River
- Coordinates: 38°23′34.81″S 176°1′23.85″E
- Status: Operational
- Commission date: November 1958
- Owner: Mercury Energy

Power generation
- Units operational: 4× Francis turbine
- Nameplate capacity: 84 MW (113,000 hp)
- Annual net output: 350 GWh (1,300 TJ)

External links
- Website: www.mercury.co.nz
- Commons: Related media on Commons

Ātiamuri Power Station is a hydroelectric power station on the Waikato River, in the North Island of New Zealand. It is the third of eight hydroelectric power stations on the Waikato River. The station can easily be seen from State Highway 1 between Taupō and Tokoroa.

Ātiamuri Power Station is 8 kilometres (5.0 mi) downstream of Ōhakuri Power Station, and takes water directly from the larger upstream station. The relatively small storage of Lake Ātiamuri means the timing of Ātiamuri's generation production is critical, particularly if Ōhakuri is generating at full capacity.

Ātiamuri, like all of the hydroelectric power stations on the Waikato River, is operated by state-owned electricity generator Mercury Energy.

== History ==
Ātiamuri was the fifth hydroelectric power station on the Waikato River to be built. Construction of the station, as well as Ōhakuri and Waipāpa, was approved by the Government, and construction of the dam and power station began in November 1953. The Government engaged design consultants Sir Alexander Gibb & Partners of London for design of the civil engineering works.

Most of the workers were housed on-site in the newly created Ātiamuri Village, with other workers coming from Mangakino, the base of the constriction of the upper Waikato River hydroelectric stations. The village of Ātiamuri contained 500 homes, a cinema, recreation room, canteen and library.

Construction of Ātiamuri was completed six months ahead of schedule, and the first three turbines and generators were commissioned in November 1958. A fourth turbine and generator was installed later, and commissioned in April 1962.

== Dam ==
Ātiamuri consists of a combined concrete gravity dam to the north and an earth embankment dam to the south.

The earth dam is 266 metres (873 ft) long, 31 metres (102 ft) high, and is 152 metres (499 ft) wide at the base and 7 metres (23 ft) at the crest. It is made of sandy clay and gravel, with the upstream side made of boulder riprap to protect against wave action.

The concrete dam is 171 metres (561 ft) long, 44 metres (144 ft) high, and is 38 metres (125 ft) wide at the base and 7.3 metres (24 ft) at the crest. The concrete dam contains the penstocks and the powerhouse, which are contained within the concrete gravity dam. The outlet works is a 129-metre (423 ft) long diversion tunnel, that is used to release water from the lake when required.

In 2017 the height of the dam was increased to reduce the risk of wave over-topping. A parapet wall was constructed into the original earth dam linking the original dam core material to a new concrete wall. To increase the height of the concrete gravity dam, steel plates were installed to the face of the dam.

== Generation ==
Water from Lake Ātiamuri is taken to the turbines in the powerhouse via four steel penstocks, each 47.8 metres (157 ft) long and 5.5 metres (18 ft) in diameter. The water from the penstocks turn four Francis turbines, each rotating at 126 rpm. Water from here is then deposited back into the Waikato River.

Each of the turbines turns a generator, each producing 21 megawatts (28,000 hp) of electricity at 11,000 volts. Electricity from the generators is stepped up to 220 kV by four transformers, each rated at 23,333 kVA.

== Transmission ==
Ātiamuri contributes its electricity directly into Transpower's 220 kV grid. The station connects to the single-circuit Wairakei to Whakamaru A line (WRK-WKM-A) at the substation to the south of the powerhouse, with electricity being distributed to Taupō and the southern Waikato, and further north to Hamilton and Auckland. Ātiamuri electricity also is distributed to the Bay of Plenty via the twin-circuit Ātiamuri to Tārukenga (near Rotorua) line (ATI-TRK-A) originating from the power station.
