= Rotokawa Power Station =

Geothermal power station in Waikato, New Zealand

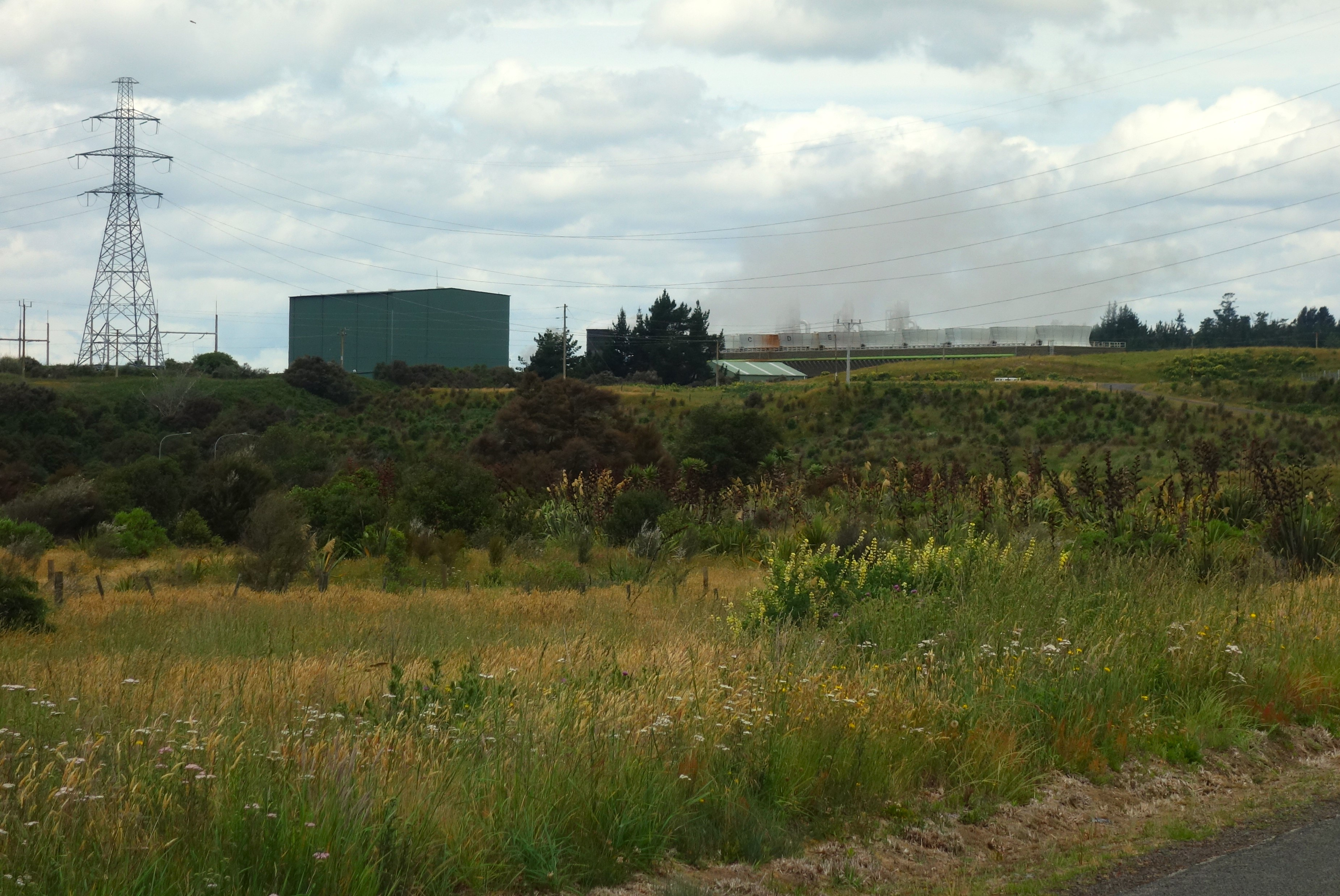
- Country: New Zealand
- Location: Waikato
- Coordinates: 38°36′43″S 176°11′35″E
- Status: Operational
- Commission date: 1997, 2002
- Owner: Mercury Energy

Power generation
- Nameplate capacity: 34 MW

External links
- Commons: Related media on Commons

The Rotokawa Power Station is a geothermal power station owned and operated by Mercury Energy. It is located approximately 10 kilometres (6.2 miles) north east of Taupō in New Zealand. The station uses a binary cycle manufactured by Ormat Industries.

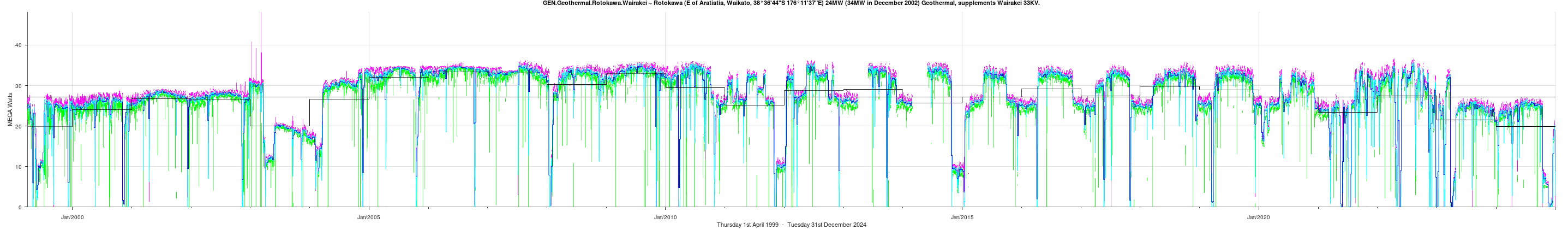
Electricity Generation at Rotokawa.

In May 2008, work began on the nearby Nga Awa Purua Power Station.

== Environmental aspects ==
Due to the high temperatures associated with the geothermal vent here, this locale is an occurrence of extremophile micro-organisms that can thrive on the high vent water temperature.

== See also ==
- Geothermal power in New Zealand
- List of power stations in New Zealand
