= Penstock =

Intake structure for turbines or sewerage systems

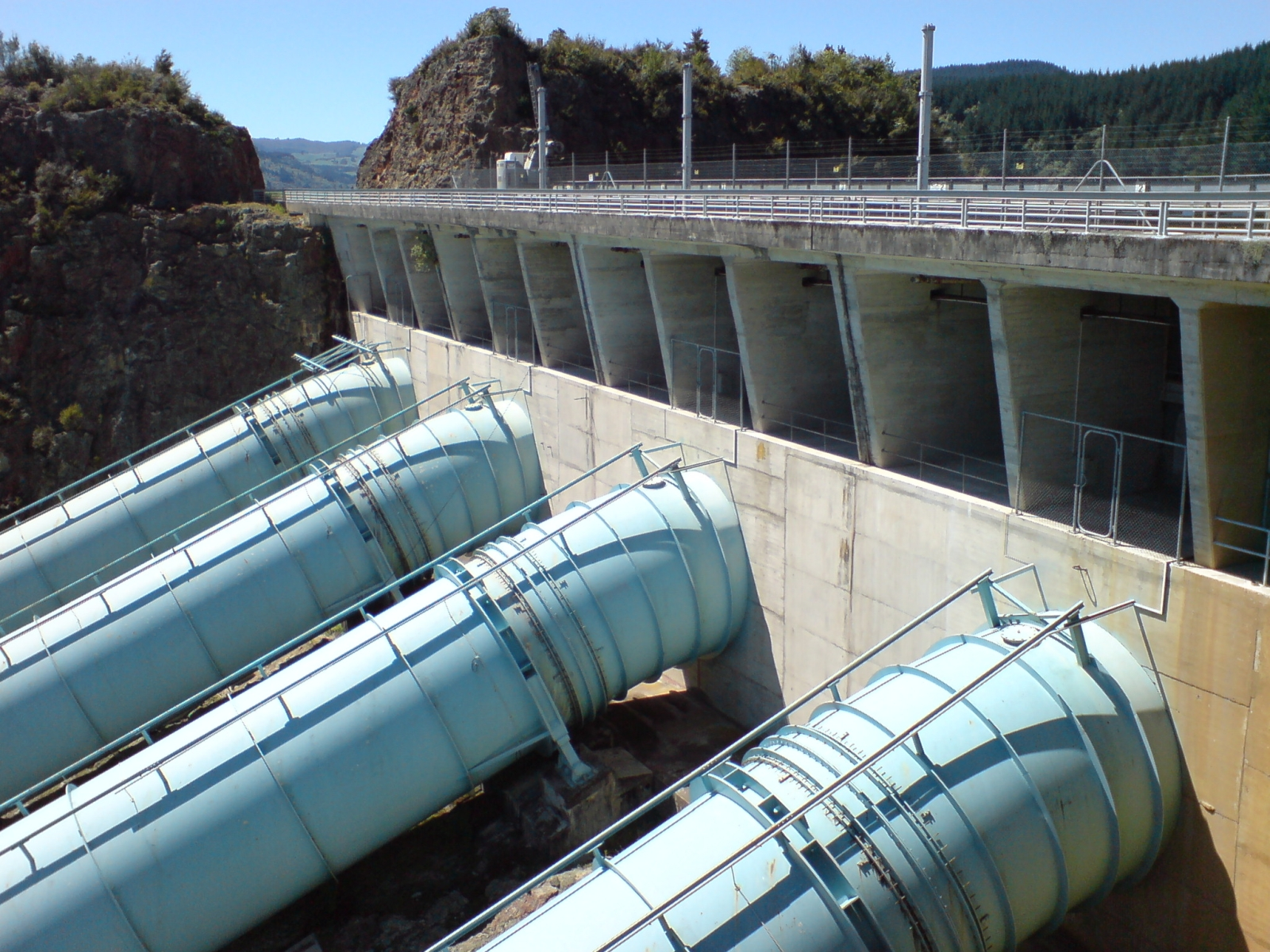
Penstocks at the Ōhakuri Dam, New Zealand

A penstock is a sluice or gate or intake structure that controls water flow, or an enclosed pipe that delivers water to hydro turbines and sewerage systems. The term is of Scots origin, and was inherited from the earlier technology of mill ponds and watermills, with penstocks diverting pond water to drive the mills.

== Hydroelectric systems and dams ==
Hydroelectric turbine penstock cross-section

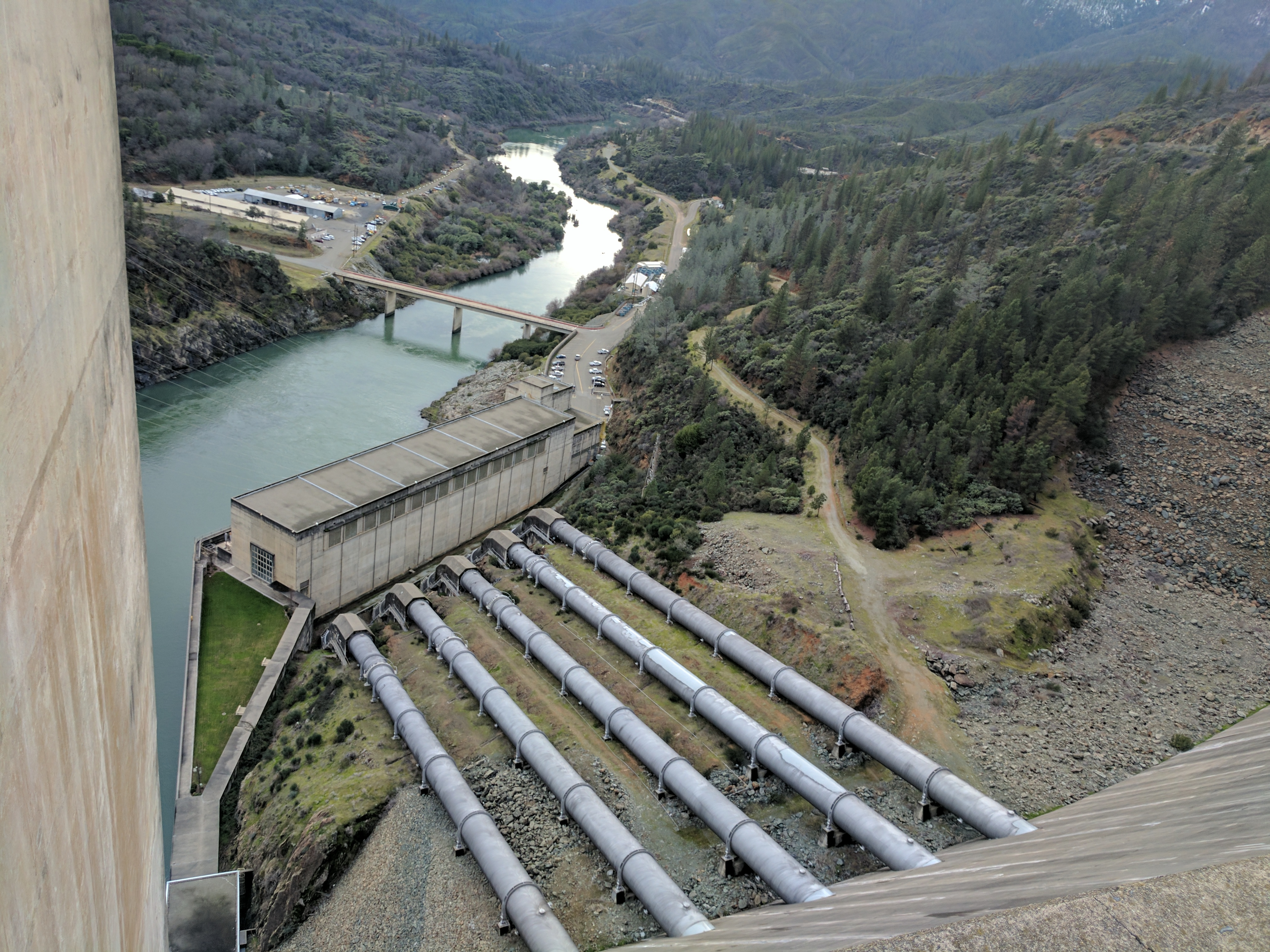
The five penstocks of Shasta Dam, California, seen from above

Penstocks for hydroelectric installations are normally equipped with a gate system and a surge tank. They can be a combination of many components such as anchor block, drain valve, air bleed valve, and support piers depending on the application. Flow is regulated to suit turbine operation and is cut off when turbines are not in service. Penstocks, particularly where used in polluted water systems, need to be maintained by hot water washing, manual cleaning, antifouling coatings, allowing waters to go anoxic, and desiccation used to dry fouling out so that it may slough off or become easier to remove through manual processes.

The term is also used in irrigation dams to refer to the channels leading to and from high-pressure sluice gates.

Penstocks are also used in mine tailings dam construction. The penstock is usually situated fairly close to the center of the tailings dam and built up using penstock rings, short reinforced ring-like sections of pipe which nest one within the other when stacked and thereby control the water level, letting the slimes settle out of the water. This water is then piped under the tailings dam back to the plant via a penstock pipeline.

== Watermills ==
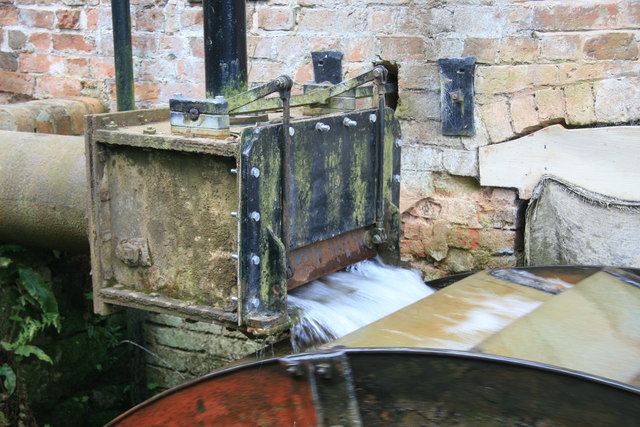
Penstock on a watermill

Inlet valves on the downstream end of penstocks are often used at mill sites to control the flow of water through the mill wheel, or to pen water into a mill pool.

== Similar structures ==
Similar structures which are not enclosed are head races or leats (non elevated), and flumes (elevated).

== Hydraulics ==
Penstocks are commonly used in water management systems such as surface water drainage and foul water sewers. Penstocks provide a means of isolation of flows and regulate the flow of water while delivering it to waste management facilities or power plants.

== Landfills ==
Penstocks are incorporated into the surface water management systems (drainage) of many landfill sites. Retention basins are constructed in order to store storm water, limiting the discharge from the site to its pre-development rate. Valved penstocks are installed at the outfall of the basin to isolate potentially contaminated surface waters from discharging into a main watercourse.
