= Lake Ohakuri =

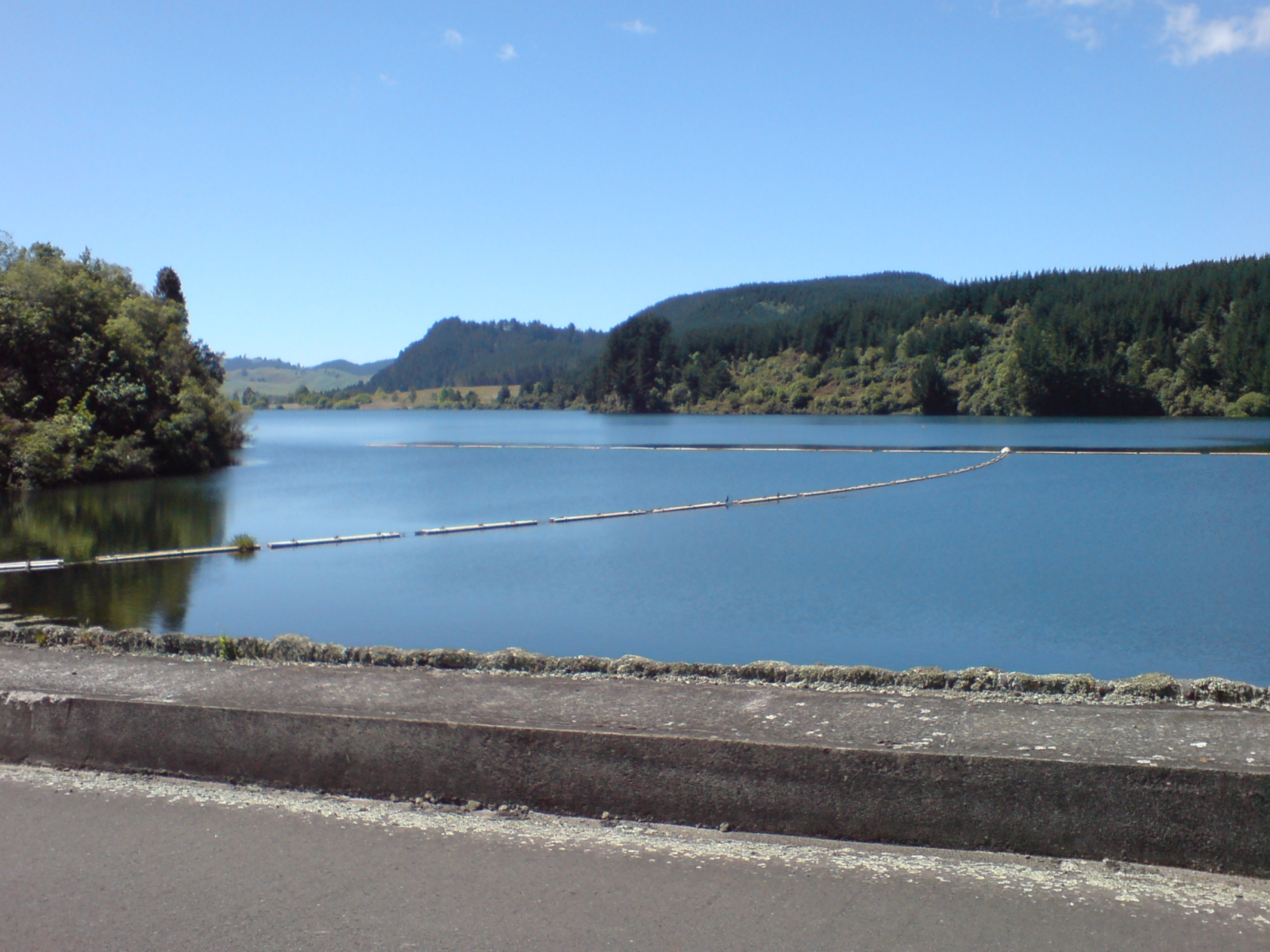
- The lake from the crown of the dam

- Location within North Island
- Location: North Island
- Coordinates: 38.42273°S 176.125474°E
- Type: Reservoir
- Primary inflows: Waikato River
- Primary outflows: Waikato River
- Basin countries: New Zealand
- Surface area: 12 km^{2} (4.6 sq mi)

Lake Ohakuri, at 12 square kilometres (4.6 sq mi), is the largest artificial lake of the Waikato river system in New Zealand. It forms the reservoir for the Ōhakuri hydroelectric power station. Construction of the dam, approved in 1955, began in 1956 and was completed in 1960. The lake was filled over 14 days in January and February 1961. This drowned two thirds of the Orakei Korako geothermal area, including two of the world's largest geysers, Minginui Geyser and Orakei Korako Geyser.

== See also ==
- Ohakuri Dam
- List of dams and reservoirs in New Zealand
