= Te Mihi Power Station =

Geothermal power station in New Zealand

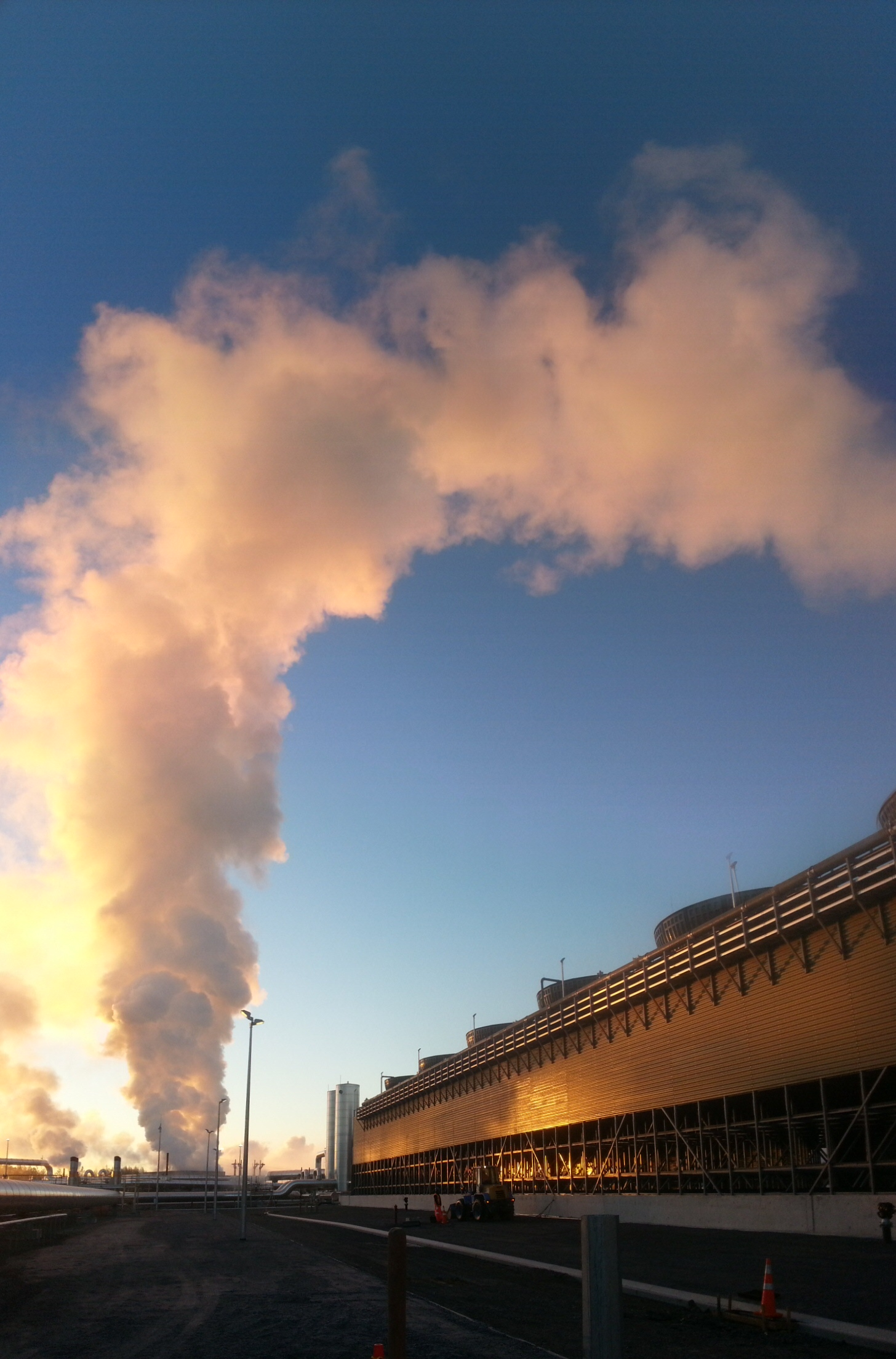
- Country: New Zealand
- Location: Taupō, New Zealand
- Coordinates: 38°37′1″S 176°2′36″E
- Status: Operational
- Construction began: March 2011
- Commission date: May 2014
- Construction cost: NZ$623 million
- Owner: Contact Energy

Power generation
- Nameplate capacity: 168 MW

The Te Mihi Power Station is a 166 MW geothermal power station owned and operated by Contact Energy, located north of Taupō in New Zealand.

The resource consent for the power station was "called in" by the Minister for the Environment Trevor Mallard under the terms of the Resource Management Act. The appointed Board of Enquiry granted the consent with a set of stipulated conditions.

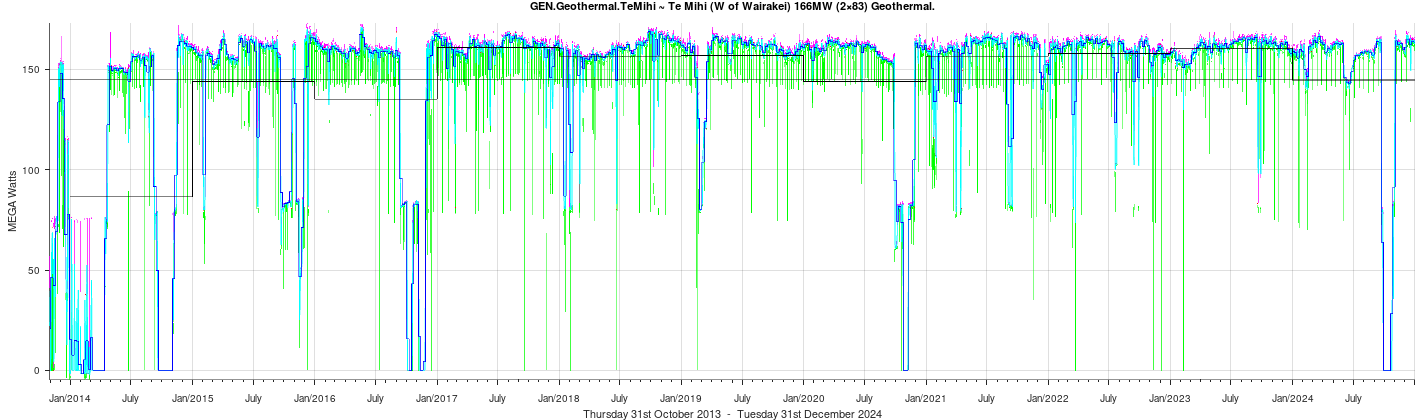
Electricity Generation at Te Mihi.

Te Mihi Power Station uses geothermal energy from the Wairakei geothermal field, which lies in the Taupō Volcanic Zone. It is part of a plan to gradually replace the Wairakei Power Station which will be phased out of production. With Te Mihi in operation, output from Wairakei is decreased by approximately 45 MW, resulting in a net increase of about 114 MW.

The project was designed and constructed by a joint venture of McConnell Dowell, SNC-Lavalin and Parsons Brinckerhoff. The plant includes two 83 MW steam turbines supplied by Toshiba. The project cost $623 million and was officially opened in August 2014.

Further power plant planned for the area are Te Mihi Stage 2 (101 MW, expected completion 2027) and Te Mihi Stage 3 (planned completion 2031)

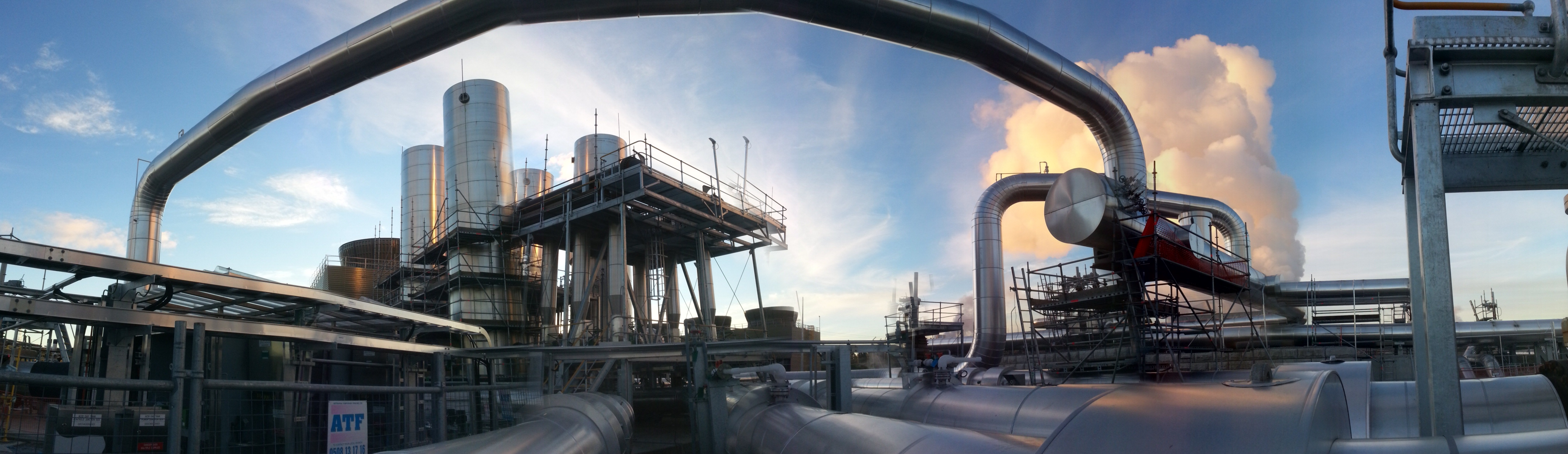
Eastern boundary where steam is introduced to the plant

== See also ==
- Geothermal power in New Zealand
- List of power stations in New Zealand
