= Rotorua City Geothermal Energy Empowering Act 1967 =

Act of Parliament in New Zealand

New Zealand Parliament
- Long title: An Act to enable the Rotorua City Council to make provisions for the control of the tapping and use of geothermal energy in the City of Rotorua
- Royal assent: 30 June 1967
- Status: Current legislation

The Rotorua City Geothermal Energy Empowering Act 1967 is an Act to enable the Rotorua City Council to make provisions for the control of the tapping and use of geothermal energy in the city of Rotorua, New Zealand.
