= Ngatamariki Power Station =

Power station in New Zealand

- Country: New Zealand
- Location: 17 km (11 mi) northeast of Taupō, Waikato
- Coordinates: 38°32′50″S 176°11′45″E
- Status: Operational
- Construction began: July 2011
- Commission date: September 2013
- Construction cost: NZ$475 million
- Owner: Mercury Energy

Geothermal power station
- Wells: 7

Power generation
- Nameplate capacity: 82 MW; 110 MW (Planned)
- Annual net output: 700 GWh

Ngatamariki is a geothermal power station commissioned in 2013 and operated by Mercury Energy. It is located approximately 17 km north east of Taupō and was constructed well under the budget of $475 million.

The field was initially explored by the Crown in 1985-86, with the wells NM1, NM2, NM3, and NM4 drilled to 1300m, 2403m, 2194m, and 2749m respectively. NM4 was the first well in New Zealand to encounter a pluton, at a depth of almost 2400m. Mighty River Power undertook further drilling in 2008-09, with wells NM5, NM6, and NM7 drilled to depths of 2997m, 3398m, and 2963m respectively. Resource consents for further development were granted in May 2010.

Work at the geothermal field site on the first stage of the plant (82 MW) commenced in July 2011 and the plant became operational in September, 2013, one month later than scheduled. The power station is a binary plant, supplied under an EPC contract by Ormat. A 220,000-volt power line connects Ngatamariki to Mercury's Nga Awa Purua Power Station, where electricity from both stations is injected into Transpower's national grid.

The Ngatamariki Geothermal site consists of 7 geothermal wells (3 production and 4 re-injection). In addition to the main geothermal wells, there are 21 sentinel and monitoring wells, to depths of 1,500m.

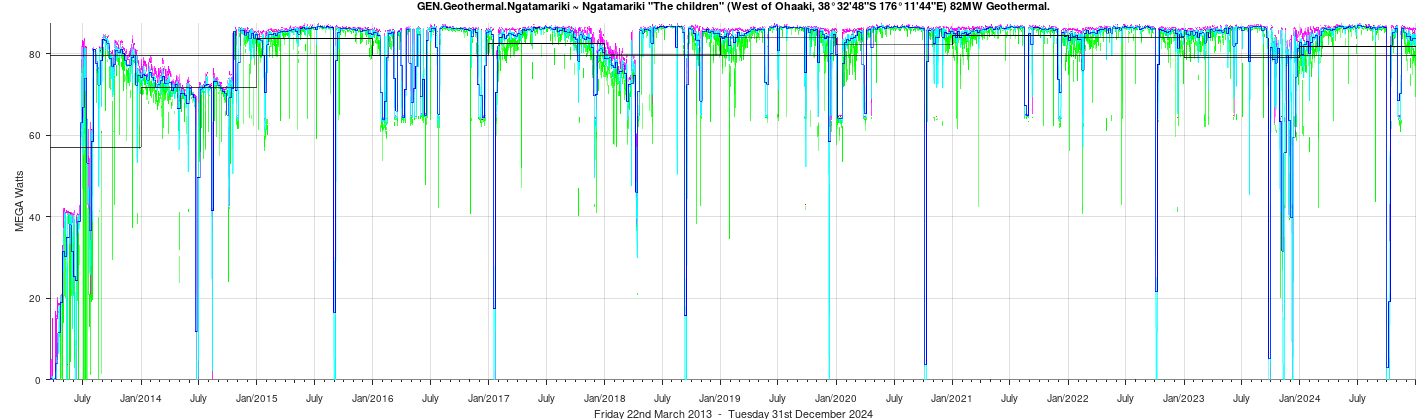
Electricity Generation at Ngatamariki.

== See also ==
- List of power stations in New Zealand
