= Kawerau Power Station =

Geothermal power plant in New Zealand

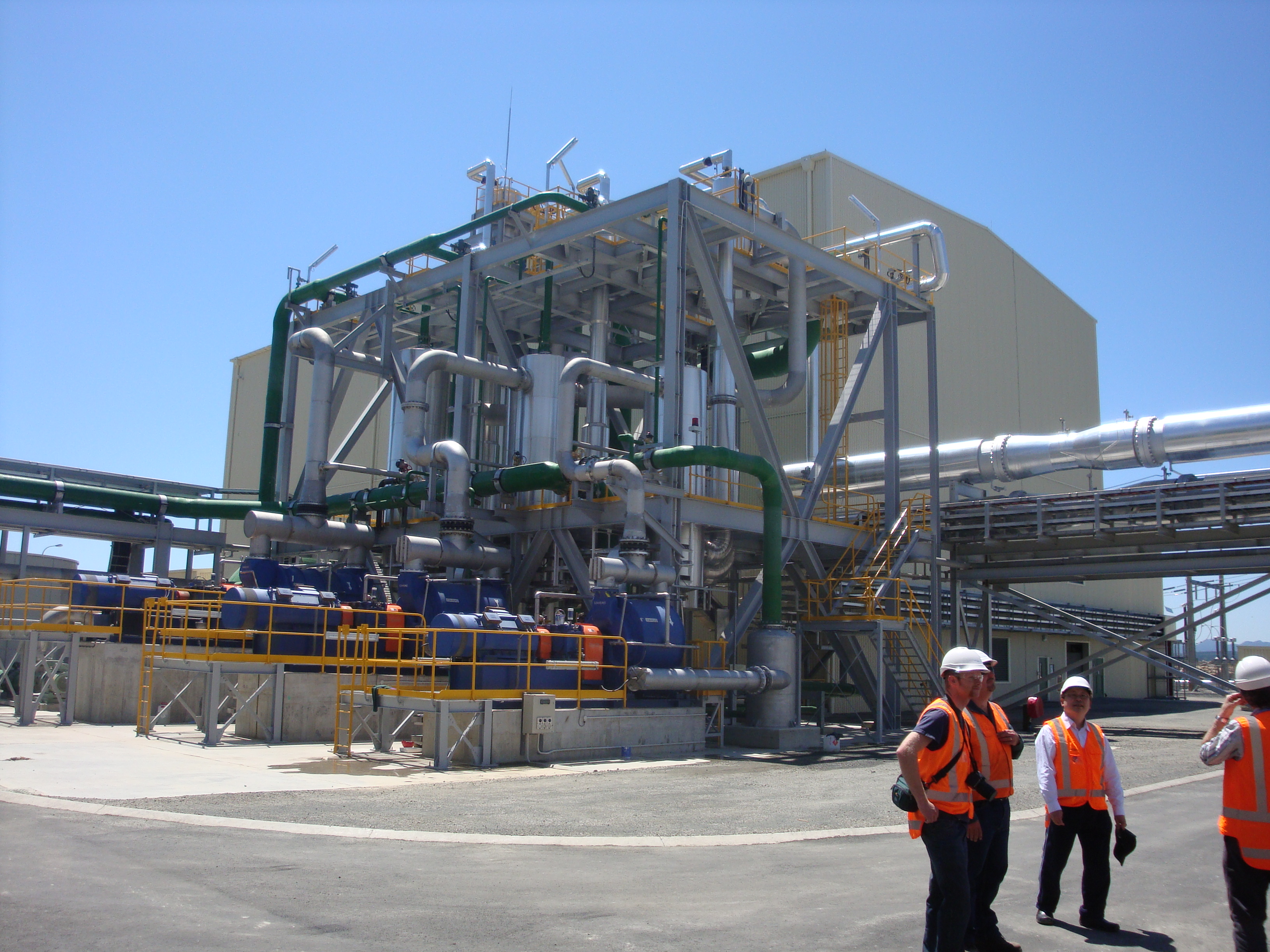
- Country: New Zealand
- Location: Bay of Plenty Region
- Coordinates: 38°3′47″S 176°43′38″E
- Status: Operational
- Commission date: 2008
- Owner: Mercury Energy

Power generation
- Nameplate capacity: 100 MW

External links
- Commons: Related media on Commons

The Kawerau Power Station is a 100-megawatt geothermal power plant located just outside the town of Kawerau in the Bay of Plenty Region of New Zealand. The power station is situated within the Kawerau geothermal field, which is part of the Taupō Volcanic Zone. Completed in July 2008 by Mighty River Power at a cost of NZ$300 million, the plant's capacity proved greater than expected. The station is the largest single-generator geothermal plant in New Zealand.

== Energy production ==
Kawerau is the world's premiere geothermal field, with multiple installations. Earlier known as the Onepu hydrothermal area, the hot springs had been used for centuries but in the 1950s the New Zealand Government with Fletcher Trust and Investment Limited began the development of the field to supply steam for the new Tasman Pulp and Paper mill. A portion of the steam is used to generate electricity for use within the mill, however, external power stations also have been constructed.

=== TG1: 1984, 2·4 MW (38°3'53"S 176°43'20"E) ===
ORMAT binary cycle. Also known as TOI for Tarawera ORMAT Installation. The first binary cycle plant in NZ. Half-hourly generation data for this station are summed with those for station TG2 in data published by the Electricity authority.

In 2014 decommissioned.

=== TG2: 1993, 3·5 MW (38°3'47"S 176°43'12"E) ===
ORMAT binary cycle. Tasman Generator 2. Half-hourly generation data for this station are summed with those for TG1 in data published by the Electricity authority. The data series ends with March 2008, due to their mismanagement of data collection.

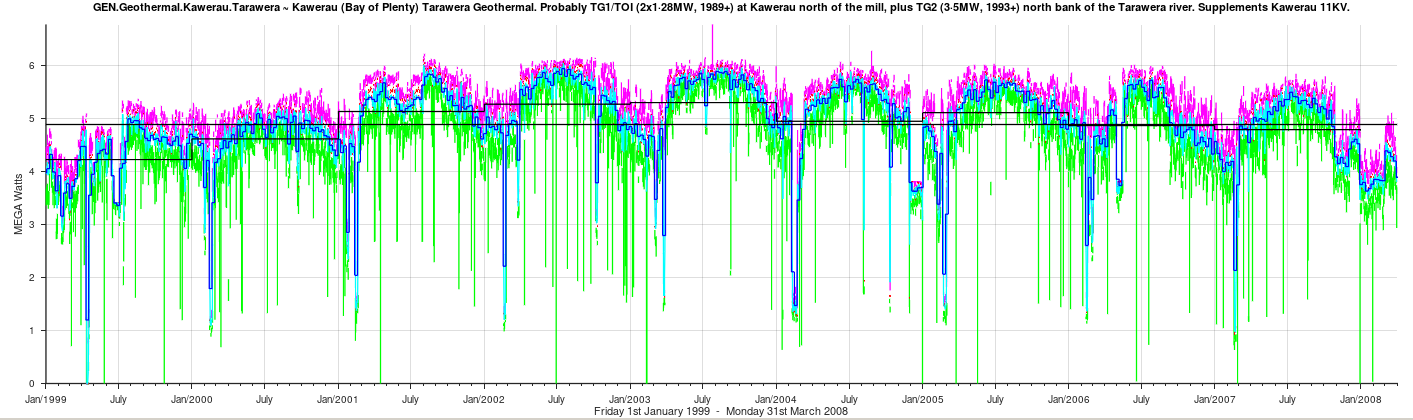
Electricity Generation at Kawerau TG1 + TG2

Being air-cooled, power production sags during the warmer summer time.

In 2020 deconstructed (brown field in a satellite image)

=== KGL: 2008, 100 MW (38°3'47"S 176°43'34"E) ===
The Kawerau geothermal power station boosted the country's geothermal capacity by 25 percent and significantly increased local generation capacity in the Eastern Bay of Plenty. The plant meets approximately one third of residential and industrial demand in the region and provides cost certainty to local industry including Norske Skog Tasman.

The station uses a single Fuji turbine and steam from geothermal bores. The two phase fluid is flashed/separated twice to produce high and low pressure steam to feed the turbine. The initial rating was for 90 MW, but it soon became clear that 100 MW could be sustained, and in 2018 perhaps 110 MW?

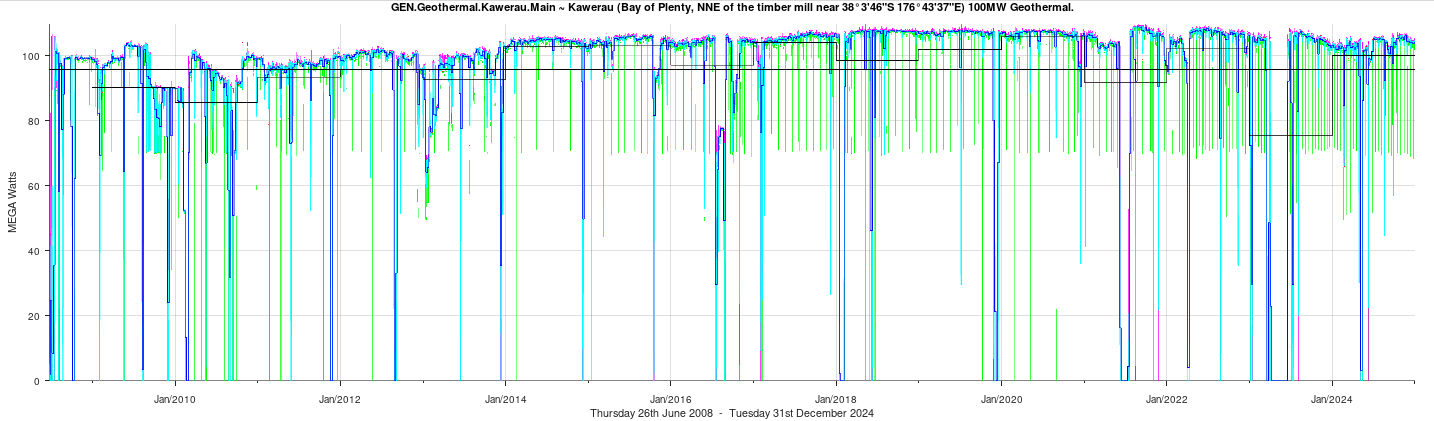
Electricity Generation at Kawerau Main.

In June 2021, the main power station suffered a mechanical failure which resulted in an outage that was expected to extend until 31 August 2021. The data (as in the plot) show that the outage started on the seventh of July, and full-power operation resumed in the twentieth of August.

=== GDL: 2008, 9 MW (38°3'39"S 176°43'20.17"E) ===
ORMAT binary cycles, constructed by Geothermal Developments Limited. Various power ratings appear (9, 9·2, 9·4 or even 10 MW) but since September 2009 the power output has been reduced to 7 MW due to the fine pumice coming up with the flow from well KA24, also provoking closedowns to clear the filters. Sold to Eastland in January 2010. No half-hourly generation data for this station are published by the Electricity authority.

=== TOPP1: 2012, 21 MW (38°3'55"S 176°43'15"E) ===
Commissioned by Norske Skog Tasman and called Tasman ORMAT Power Plant 1. Sold to Ngati Tuwharetoa Geothermal Assets (NTGA) in 2016, bought by Eastland in 2021. No half-hourly generation data for this station are published by the Electricity authority.

=== TAOM: 2018, 24 MW (38°3'50"S 176°42'11"E) ===
ORMAT binary cycle plant, called Te Ahi O Maui. This station uses fluid from wells TP-1 and TP-2. The access road branches off Spencer Avenue, which may be mentioned in location descriptions.

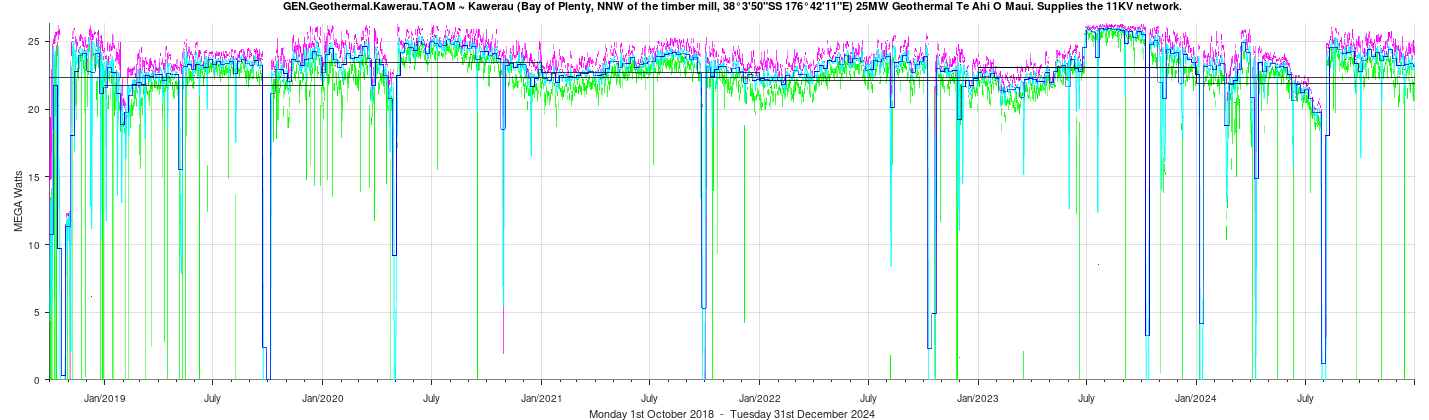
Electricity Generation at Kawerau Te Ahi O Maui.

=== TOPP2: 2025, 49 MW (38°4'31"S 176°41'59"E) ===
ORMAT binary cycle plant, owned and operated by Eastland. No half-hourly generation data for this station are published by the Electricity authority.

As time goes on, some boreholes falter in production, and new ones are drilled. There is an extensive network of interconnecting pipelines to distribute geothermal fluid, and increasingly, to take exhausted fluid for re-injection on the periphery of the field rather than dumping it into the river. All of this is conducted via complex and changing relationships amongst multiple parties.

== Gallery ==
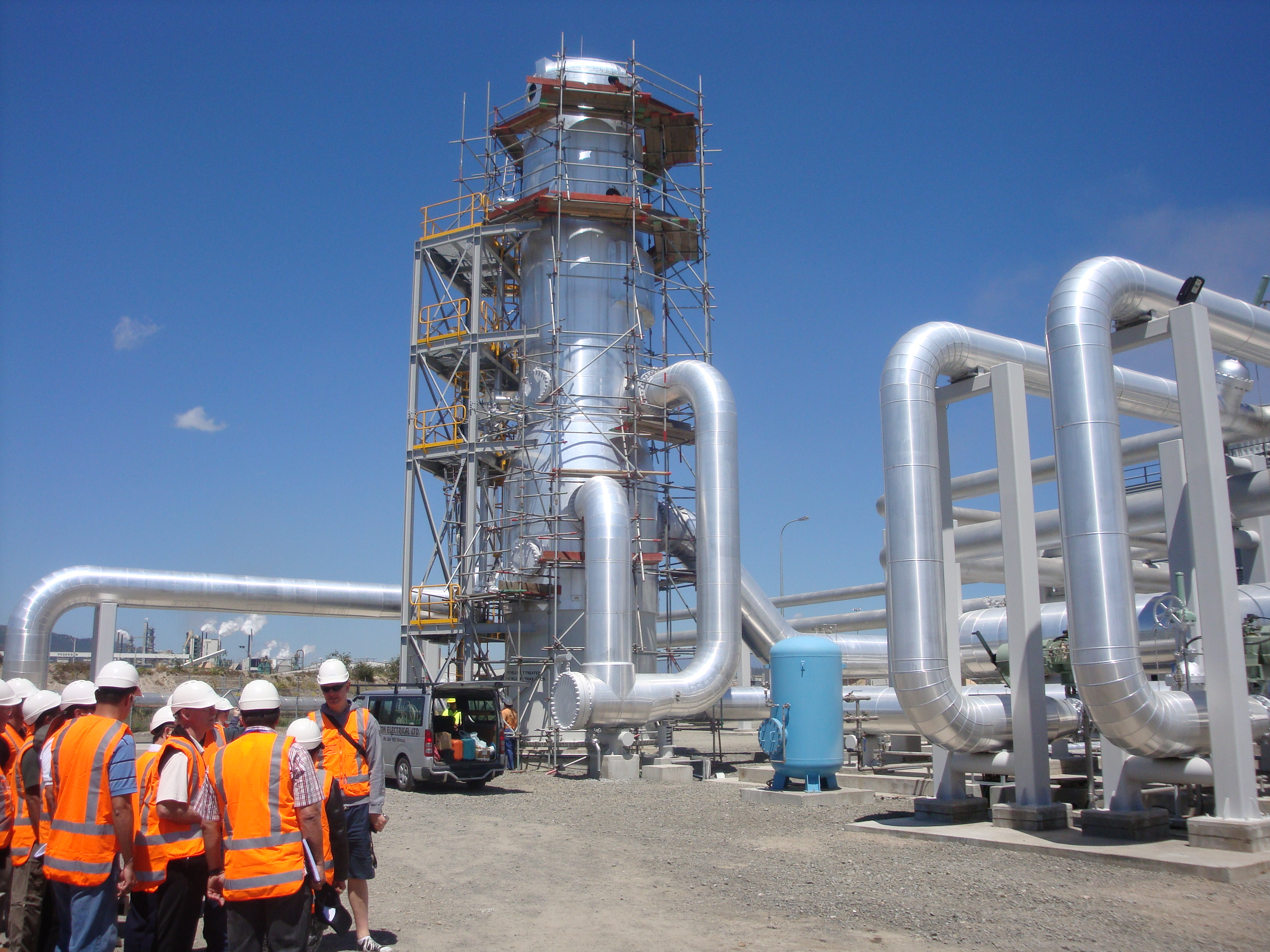
Steam separator

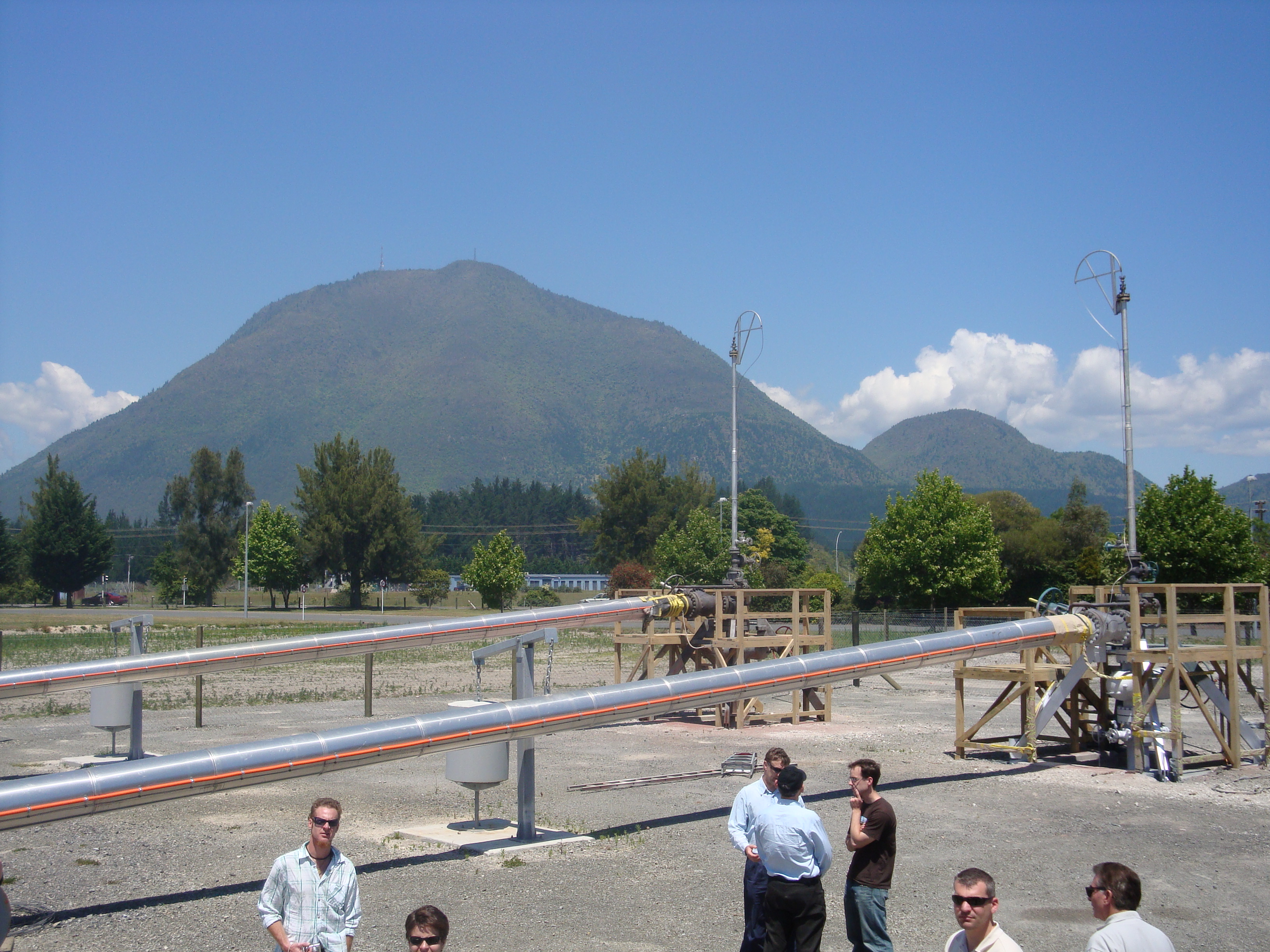
Borefield

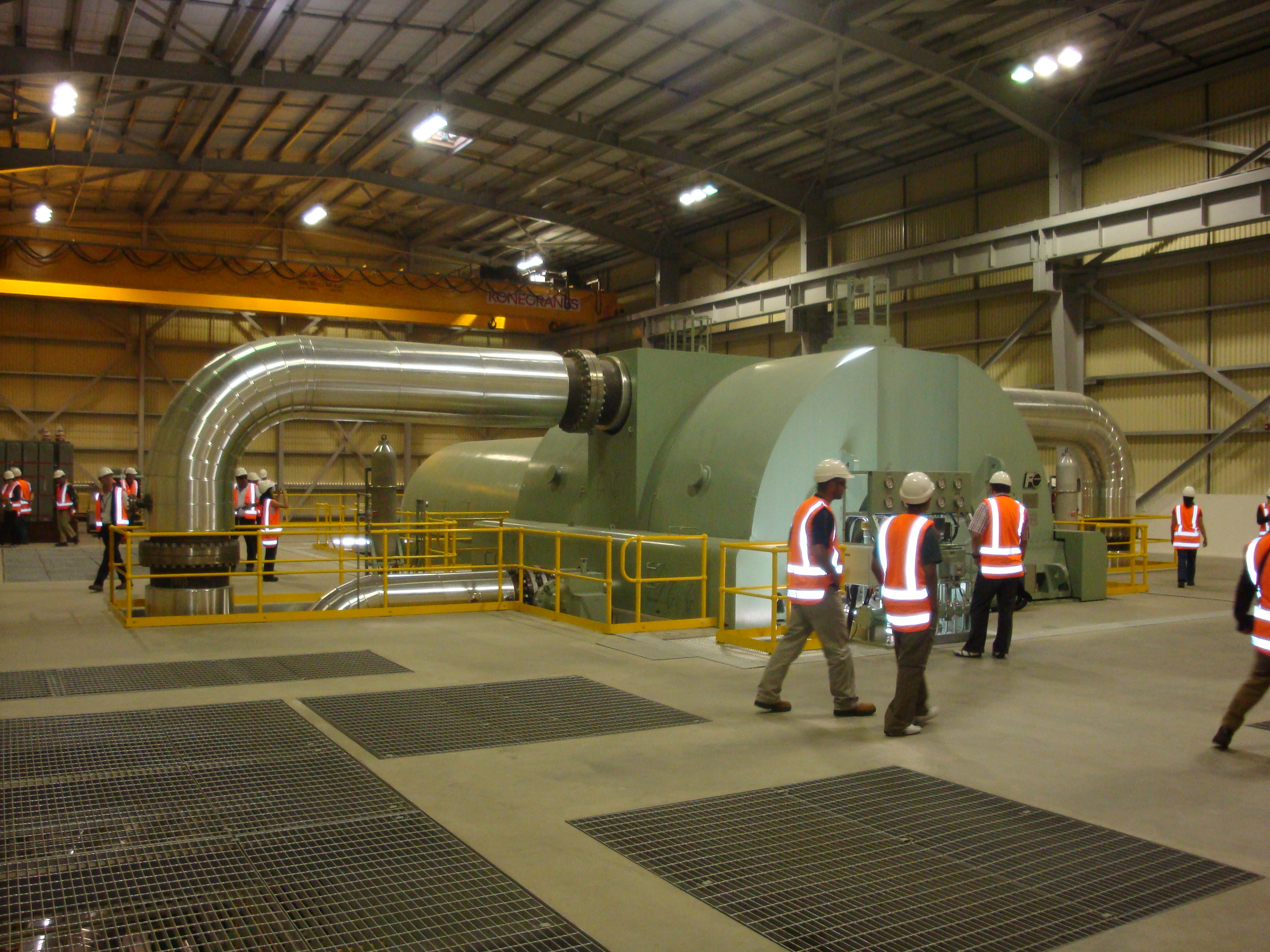
Turbine hall

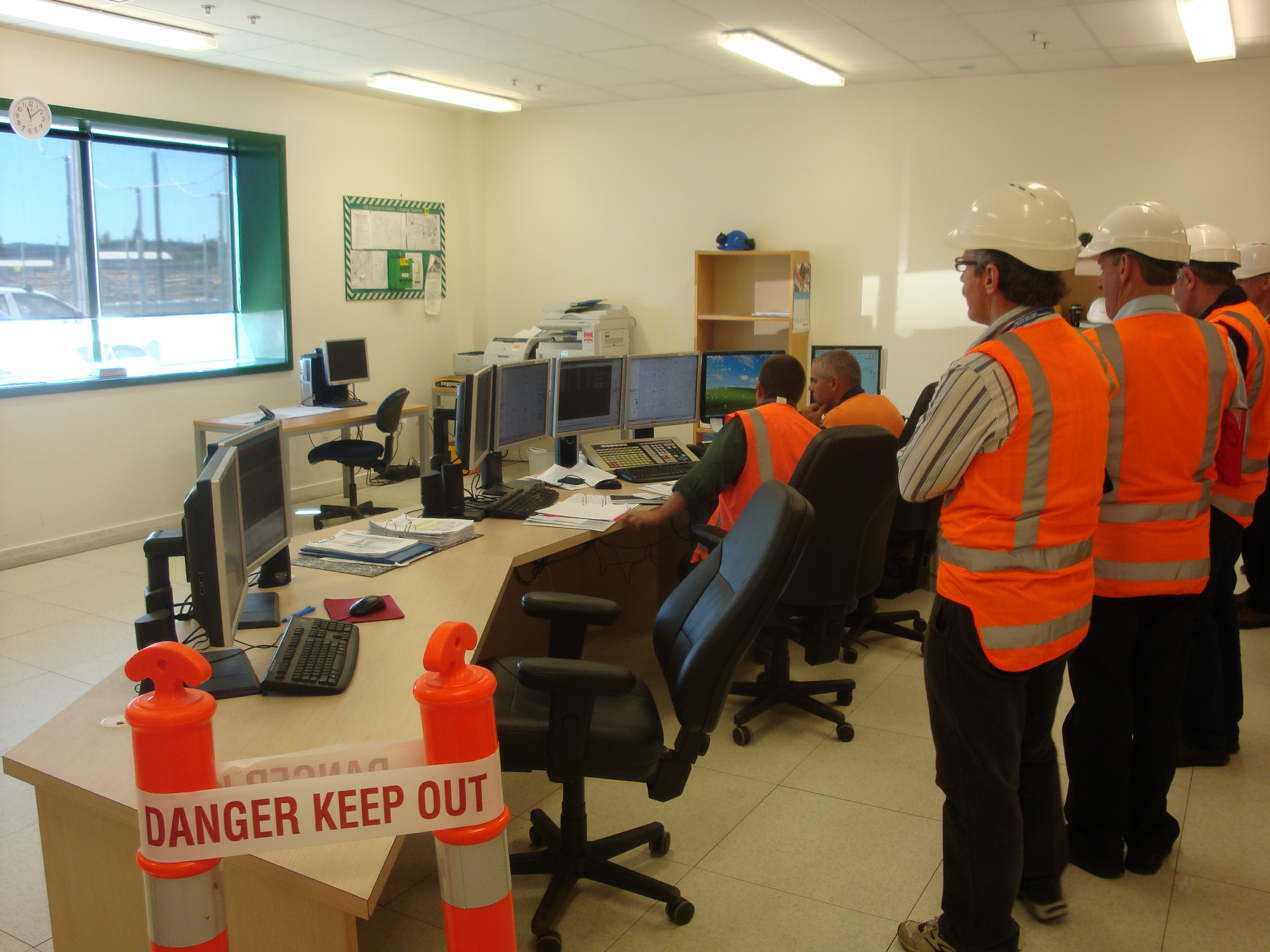
Control room

== See also ==
- Geothermal power in New Zealand
