= Eastland Generation =

New Zealand electricity generator company

- Type: Private
- Industry: Electricity generation
- Founded: 2010
- Headquarters: Kawerau, New Zealand
- Website: eastlandgeneration.nz

Eastland Generation is a New Zealand electricity generation company specialising in renewable energy. As of 2026 it owns and operates four geothermal, one hydro-electric, and one solar power station. The company was originally wholly owned by the Eastland Group, a regional infrastructure holding company 100% owned by the Trust Tairāwhiti regional infrastructure trust. In May 2024 Eastland Group sold 50% of the company to the Obayashi Corporation as part of a capital raise.

== History ==
Eastland Generation evolved from the Poverty Bay Electric Power Board. During the electricity sector reforms of the 1990s, the PEPB was rebranded as Eastland Energy, then the Eastland Network, with ownership vested in a community trust. The Eastland network expanded into electricity generation in 1999 with the purchase of the Waihi hydroelectric station. In 2010, the generation assets were separated into a separate company following the purchase of a geothermal power station.

In 2016 damage to the Waihi dam caused ongoing pollution to the area's drinking water, resulting in the company having to pay the Wairoa District Council more than $100,000 in cleanup costs.

In 2018 the company completed construction of the 24MW Te Ahi o Maui geothermal power station. In June 2021 Eastland acquired the 26 MW TOPP1 geothermal station. In August 2023 it received fast-track consent for its Tāheke 8C geothermal power station. In November 2023 it commissioned Te Ihi o te Ra, its first solar power station.

In May 2024 Eastland Group sold 50% of the company to the Obayashi Corporation as part of a capital raise.

== Power stations ==
=== Operational ===
Name	Type	Location	Capacity (MW)	Annual generation (average GWh)	Commissioned
Geothermal Development Limited	Geothermal	Kawerau	8	67	2008
Te Ahi O Maui	Geothermal	Kawerau	26	182	2018
Te Ihi o te Ra	Solar	Gisborne Airport, Gisborne	5.2	7.2	2023
TOPP1	Geothermal	Kawerau	24	181	2012
TOPP2	Geothermal	Kawerau	49		2026
Waihi Dam	Hydro	Lake Ruapapa, near Wairoa	5	10	1986

=== Proposed / under construction ===
Name	Type	Location	Projected capacity (MW)	Status
Taheke 8C	Geothermal	Okere Falls	35	Consented
Tolaga Bay	Solar	Tolaga Bay, East Coast	11.7	Proposed
Wairoa	Solar	Wairoa, East Coast	9	Proposed
