= Mercury NZ =

New Zealand electricity company

Mercury NZ Limited
- Type: Public
- Traded as: NZX: MCY
- Industry: Electric power generation
- Predecessor: ECNZ, Mighty River Power
- Founded: 1 April 1999
- Headquarters: Auckland, New Zealand
- Key people: Stew Hamilton (CEO)
- Products: Electric power
- Services: Electricity retailing
- Revenue: ▲NZ$2,188M (2022)
- Operating income: ▲NZ$581M (2022)
- Net income: ▲NZ$469M (2022)
- Total assets: ▲NZ$9,660M (2022)
- Total equity: ▲NZ$4,752M (2022)
- Owner: New Zealand Government (51.15%)
- Number of employees: 1335 (2022)
- Subsidiaries: GLOBUG (prepay power)
- Website: www.mercury.co.nz

Mercury NZ Limited is a New Zealand electricity generation and multi-product utility retailer of electricity, gas, broadband and mobile telephone services. All the company's electricity generation is renewable. Mercury has a pre-paid electricity product sub-brand GLOBUG. Mercury Energy is also the largest electricity retailer in New Zealand.

Mercury generates most of its energy from nine hydro stations on the Waikato River and five geothermal plants in the central North Island as well as a number of wind farms. As of June 2021, Mercury had generated 3,611 GWh of electricity through hydro generation and 2,594 GWh through geothermal generation.

Mercury also service industrial and wholesale market customers offering electricity and natural gas products. Since 2022 it has also offered internet fibre broadband services as a bundle for its residential electricity customers. Mercury has offices in Auckland, Tauranga, Hamilton, Rotorua, Palmerston North, Wellington and Oamaru.

== History ==
In the 1980s, the New Zealand Electricity Department (NZED) (a government department) controlled and operated almost all New Zealand electricity generation and operated the electricity transmission grid. The first phase of deregulation saw the New Zealand Government corporatise the NZED and form the state-owned enterprise Electricity Corporation of New Zealand (ECNZ).

In 1994, Mercury NZ Limited was formed by the Auckland Energy Consumer Trust to own and operate the electricity supply business previously operated by the community-owned local authority, Auckland Electric Power Board (AEPB). That same year, Transpower New Zealand was separated from ECNZ and created as a State Owned Enterprise (SOE) to own and operate the national grid. Four years later, law changes obligated AEPB to sell the electricity retailing and generation part of the business.

In 1996, ECNZ split into two SOEs, ECNZ and Contact Energy. ECNZ was further split into three companies on 1 April 1999 – Genesis Energy, Meridian Energy and Mighty River Power. Mercury's electricity retailing division was sold to Mighty River Power, who continued the trading name Mercury Energy. The electricity distribution business Mercury Energy Limited changed its name to Vector Limited and continued the distribution and transmission operation.

In 1998 the Commerce Commission allowed Mercury to acquire Power New Zealand Ltd, which itself had been formed in 1994 from the Waitemata and Thames Valley Electric Power Boards.

Logo of the former Mighty River Power

Mighty River Power took over the ownership and operation of the nine hydroelectric power stations on the Waikato River, New Zealand's longest river, and inherited assets of two largely decommissioned oil-fired power stations at Marsden Point, near Whangārei and its share in the Southdown Power Station (in conjunction with the Natural Gas Corporation).

In 2000, Mighty River Power acquired the Rotokawa geothermal power station, to operate and maintain the station, and own the geothermal turbines in a joint venture with the Tauhara North No.2 Trust. Also, that year, Mighty River Power commissioned the Mōkai geothermal power station geothermal power station in a joint venture with the Tuaropaki Trust.

In September 2002, Mighty River Power gained 100 percent ownership of the Southdown Power Station.

In 2004, Mighty River Power announced plans to refurbish the Marsden B plant to fire it on coal to increase supply security north of Auckland. Marsden B had been mothballed since it was completed in 1978 due to rising oil prices following the 1973 oil crisis and there being cheaper alternatives available. Greenpeace staged a nine-day occupation of the site in 2005, and after the Northland Regional Council granted consent, appealed to both the Environment Court and High Court, eventually overturning the consent. Mighty River Power appealed the High Court decision to the Court of Appeal, but in March 2007 dropped the proposal.

In 2008, Mighty River Power increased its generating capacity by opening the 100 MW Kawerau geothermal power station, increasing supply security to the eastern Bay of Plenty, a large timber processing area. In 2010, it opened the 140 MW Nga Awa Purua geothermal station near Taupō with the largest single-shaft geothermal turbine in the world. The commissioning of Nga Awa Purua increased Mighty River's geothermal capacity to 385 MW making it the nation's largest geothermal electricity generator with 52.7 percent of all installed geothermal capacity.

In 2009, Mighty River Power sold the Marsden B plant for $20 million to an Indian company, United Telecom. Resource consents for dismantling the plant were granted in June 2011, and the 20,000 tonnes of plant and equipment was dismantled later in 2011.

In Dec 2011, the National Government announced plans to reduce its shareholding in the four state-owned energy companies, Contact Energy, Genesis Energy, Meridian Energy and Mighty River Power (Mercury) from 100 percent to 51 percent and to sell off the remaining 49 percent as part of its controversial "mixed-ownership model" plan. Mighty River Power was to be the first company to be partially sold in September 2012, pursuant to legislative changes and market conditions. However, threatened legal action and unfavourable market conditions saw the Government delay any sale until March 2013 at the earliest.

On 5 March 2012, the Government began taking registrations of interest from the public in Mighty River Power shares. More than 35,000 people tried to register in the first six hours causing the registration website to crash for much of the day. By midnight, more than 90,000 people had registered.

In April 2013, State Owned Enterprises Minister Tony Ryall, in anticipation of the sale, said director fees would be increasing from $49,000 a year to $85,000, and the chair's fees from $98,000 to $150,000, despite still being majority-owned by taxpayers.

On 2 April 2013, The Financial Markets Authority approved the sale of Mighty River Power with the IPO (Initial Public Offering) on 15 April. However, the IPO was temporarily suspended on 22 April while a supplementary disclosure was issued, after the Labour and Green parties in opposition announced plans to reform the electricity market if elected to government at the 2014 election. At the close of the IPO on 5 May, there were 113,000 shareholders, and on 8 May the opening share price was set at $2.50, raising $1.7 billion. The Government was slightly disappointed, blaming the Labour-Green policy for putting off many more potential shareholders, with the Finance Minister indicating before the policy was announced that the price would be in the $2.70 to $2.80 range The government retained 51.78 percent of the shareholding, with another 1.02 percent owned by other Crown interests (mainly the New Zealand Superannuation Fund).

By September, shares had slumped to $2.16, well below the float price and in October the company announced it would be buying back up to $50 million in shares.

Logo of the former Mercury Energy

In December 2015, the gas fired Southdown Power Station, a 170 MW combined cycle power station in south Auckland was closed.

On 29 July 2016, after merging its retail and generation businesses the company changed its name to Mercury NZ Limited. The company also launched a new brand logo, moving from the Roman god Mercury, to a bee. Market research showed New Zealand had a stronger connection to the bee as a symbol.

In August 2021, Mercury acquired five operating wind farms and several wind farm development options from Tilt Renewables. At the same time, the first power from the newly built wind farm at Turitea was generated – adding to the existing portfolio of nine hydro stations on the Waikato River and five geothermal plants located in the central North Island.

In August 2021, Mercury acquired five operating wind farms and several wind farm development options. At the same time, the first power from the newly built wind farm at Turitea was generated.

In May 2022, Mercury acquired the retail business of Trustpower, including the retail customer base and Trustpower brand. The generation business of Trustpower changed its name to Manawa Energy.

In June 2023, Mercury brought the two brands Mercury and Trustpower together under singular brand of Mercury.

== Power stations ==
Mercury operates 17 generation sites; 8 Hydroelectric Powerstations, 5 Geothermal, and 4 Wind Farms.

In total, the company has 2155 MW of generating capacity – 1096 MW hydroelectric, 475 MW geothermal and 584 MW wind.

Name	Type	Location	Capacity (MW)	Annual generation (average GWh)	Commissioned	Notes
Arapuni	Hydroelectric	Waikato River	198	805	First 4 machines 1929; further 2 in 1938; another 2 in 1946	
Aratiatia	Hydroelectric	Waikato River	78	331	March - May 1964	
Ātiamuri	Hydroelectric	Waikato River	74	305	First 3 machines - Nov 1958; 4th machine April 1962	
Karāpiro	Hydroelectric	Waikato River	96	490	Machine 1 - May 1947; Machine 2 - Sept 1947; Machine3 - May 1948	Refurbishment project underway (expected completion 2025) once fully refurbished capacity will increase to 112.5 MW with expected annual average generation of 537 GW
Kawerau	Geothermal	Kawerau, Bay of Plenty	106	848	2008	
Mahinerangi Wind Farm	Wind	Otago	68	245	2011	Acquired from Tilt Renewables August 2021
Maraetai	Hydroelectric	Waikato River	360	878	Maraetai 1 - 1952; Maraetai 2 - 1970	
Mōkai	Geothermal	North-west of Taupō	112	890	2000	Joint venture with Tuaropaki Trust
Ngā Awa Pūrua	Geothermal	North of Taupō	139	1140	2010	Joint venture with Tauhara North No.2 Trust; World's largest geothermal turbine (147 MW rated)
Ngā Tamariki	Geothermal	North of Taupō	85	705	2013	
Ōhakuri	Hydroelectric	Waikato River	112	405	1961	
Rotokawa	Geothermal	North of Taupō	33	270	1997	Joint venture with Tauhara North No.2 Trust
Tararua Wind Farm	Wind	Tararua Ranges	161	563	Stage 1: 1991 Stage 2: 2004 Stage 3: 2007	Acquired from Tilt Renewables August 2021
Turitea Wind Farm	Wind	Tararua Ranges	222	840	2023	Turitea is currently NZ's largest wind farm
Waipipi Wind Farm	Wind	South Taranaki	133	455	2021	Acquired from Tilt Renewables August 2021
Waipāpa	Hydroelectric	Waikato River	54	238	1961	
Whakamaru	Hydroelectric	Waikato River	124	497	1956	

=== Generation developments ===
Name	Type	Location	Planned capacity (MW)	Status
Puketoi	Wind	Puketoi Ranges		Consent application lodged August 2011, granted June 2012
Tararua I & II repowering	Wind	Manawatu	140 vs 68 existing	Development option acquired from Tilt Renewables August 2021
Kaiwaikawe	Wind	Northland	70	Development option acquired from Tilt Renewables August 2021
Mahinerangi II	Wind	Otago	160	Development option acquired from Tilt Renewables August 2021
Kaiwera Downs	Wind	Southland	Stage 1 43; Stage 2 to bring total to 240	Stage 1 scheduled to commence Oct 2022

== Subsidiaries ==
In addition to its generation assets, Mercury also incorporates or has major shareholdings in:

- GLOBUG, a pre-pay electricity retailer

== See also ==
- Electricity sector in New Zealand
- List of power stations in New Zealand
- Starship Foundation, a charity supported by Mercury since 2001
