= Ngawha geothermal field =

The Ngawha geothermal field is a geothermal area in the North Island of New Zealand. It is situated approximately 5 km east of Kaikohe and is centred on the village of Ngawha Springs. The field covers an area of around 25 km^{2}, much smaller than the other major high-temperature geothermal field in New Zealand, the Taupō Volcanic Zone. The hot springs arising in this area are slightly acidic and are rich in ammonia, bicarbonate, boron and mercury, which is not typical of springs in New Zealand.

Top Energy owns and operates the Ngāwhā Geothermal Power Station, which opened in 1998 and has been expanded several times since.
