= Orakei Korako =

Geothermal area in New Zealand

Coordinates: 38°28′24″S 176°8′54″E

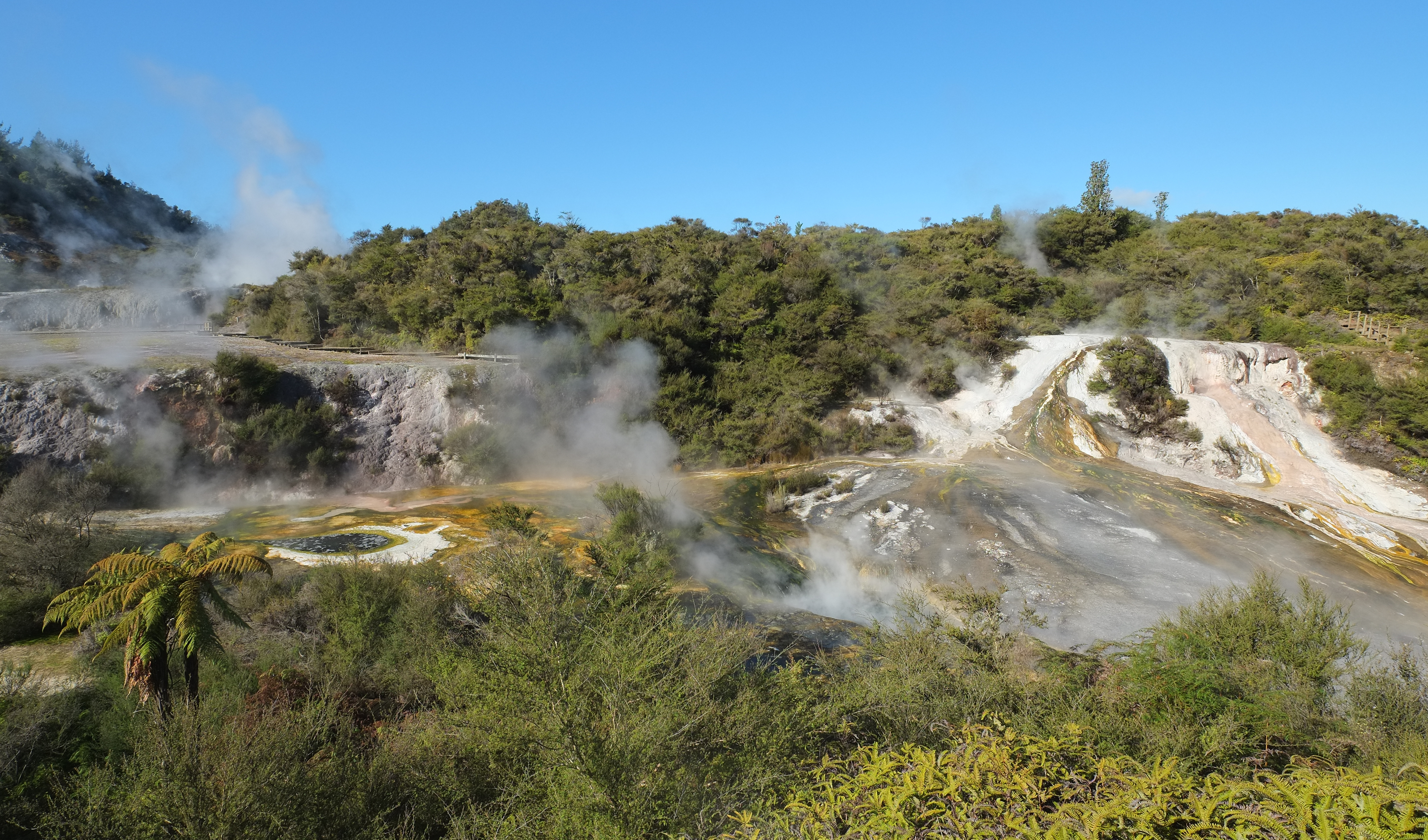
Orakei Korako.

Orakei Korako is a highly active geothermal area most notable for its series of fault-stepped sinter terraces, located in a valley north of Taupō on the banks of the Waikato River in the Taupō Volcanic Zone, New Zealand. It is also known as "The Hidden Valley".

The New Zealand Ministry for Culture and Heritage gives a translation of "place of adornment near the white [sinter flat]" for Ōrākei Kōrako.

== History of the region ==
From earliest times the Waikato Valley near Orakei Korako was occupied by Māori of Ngāti Tahu – Ngāti Whaoa. By the early 19th century the Māori population had congregated at Orakei Korako, probably attracted by the hot springs, which they used for cooking and bathing. Around 1819, the local Māori hid in an alum cave on the site from a passing raiding party of Ngāpuhi and Ngāti Pāoa. The date when the Ngāti Tahu vacated the valley to settle at other locations is not recorded, but it has been suggested that they left after the eruption of Mount Tarawera in 1886, when great changes are alleged to have occurred in the hot springs. By the turn of the 20th century all but two families had moved from Orakei Korako.

The earliest known route from Rotorua to Taupō for early European travellers passed right through Orakei Korako, and it was the existing Māori who provided a dugout canoe for the river crossings. It was at this point in the early 20th century that the geothermal area was established as a visitor attraction. To transfer visitors across the then-swift Waikato River they used the dugout canoe, until in the 1930s a wire-strop and pulley system was erected across the river, and a punt with a guiding rudder was used to catch the flow and propel the punt to the other side. The tourist resort was officially opened on 15 December 1937.

The first proposal for power development at Orakei Korako was made in 1904, but it was not until 1955 that the scheme was finally approved. By May 1960 an earth-filled dam, rising 49 metres above the original river level, was placed and consolidated. The filling of Lake Ohakuri began on 19 January 1961 and was completed in 14 days.

Two of the world's largest geysers were drowned by the lake: Minginui Geyser, which was once observed erupting up to 90 metres high (equal to the world's tallest currently active geyser, Steamboat Geyser in Yellowstone National Park), and the Orakeikorako Geyser, which on occasion could erupt up to 55 metres, and which gave the whole region its name.

== Orakei Korako today ==
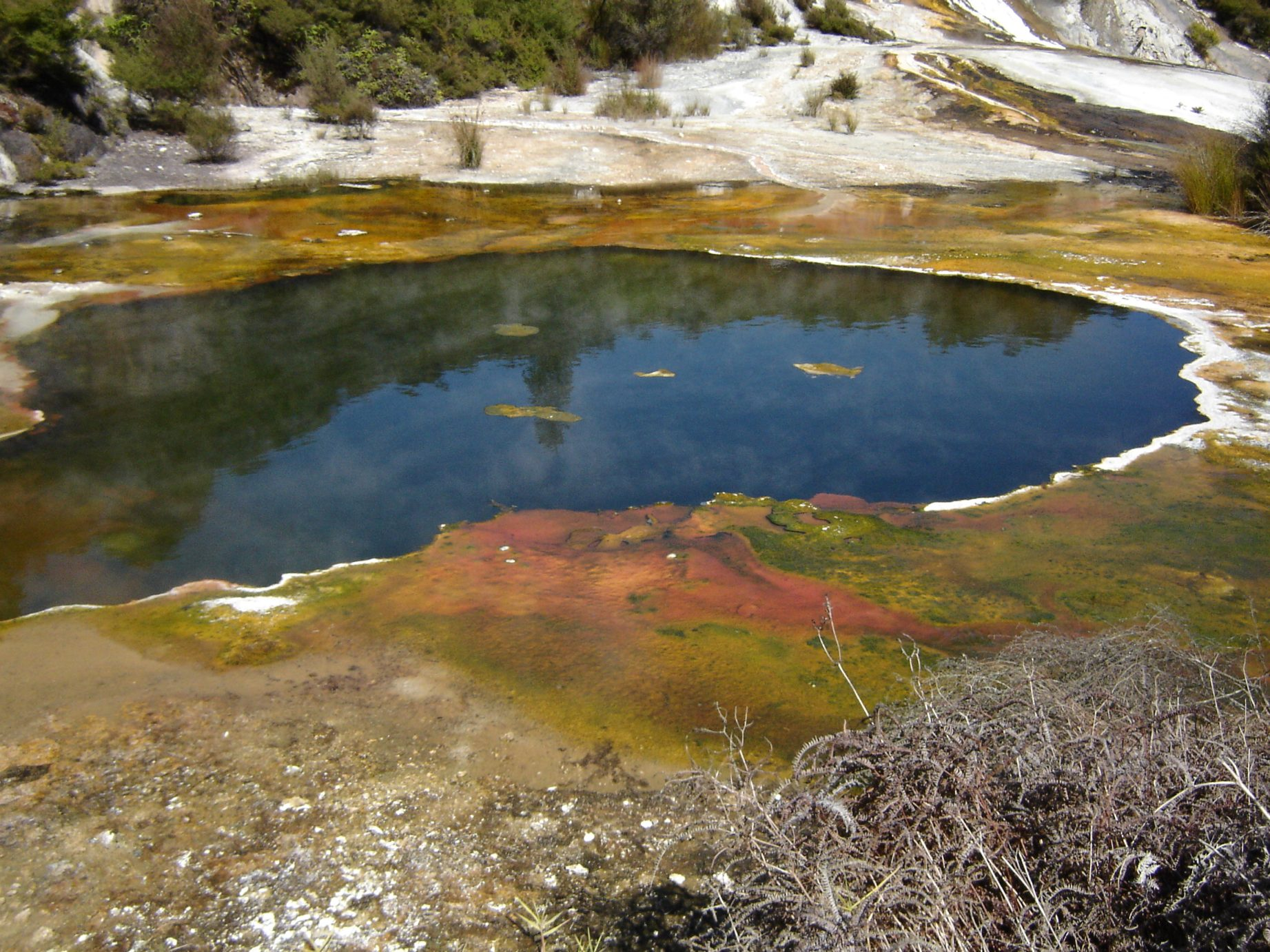
Rainbow Terrace at Orakei Korako.

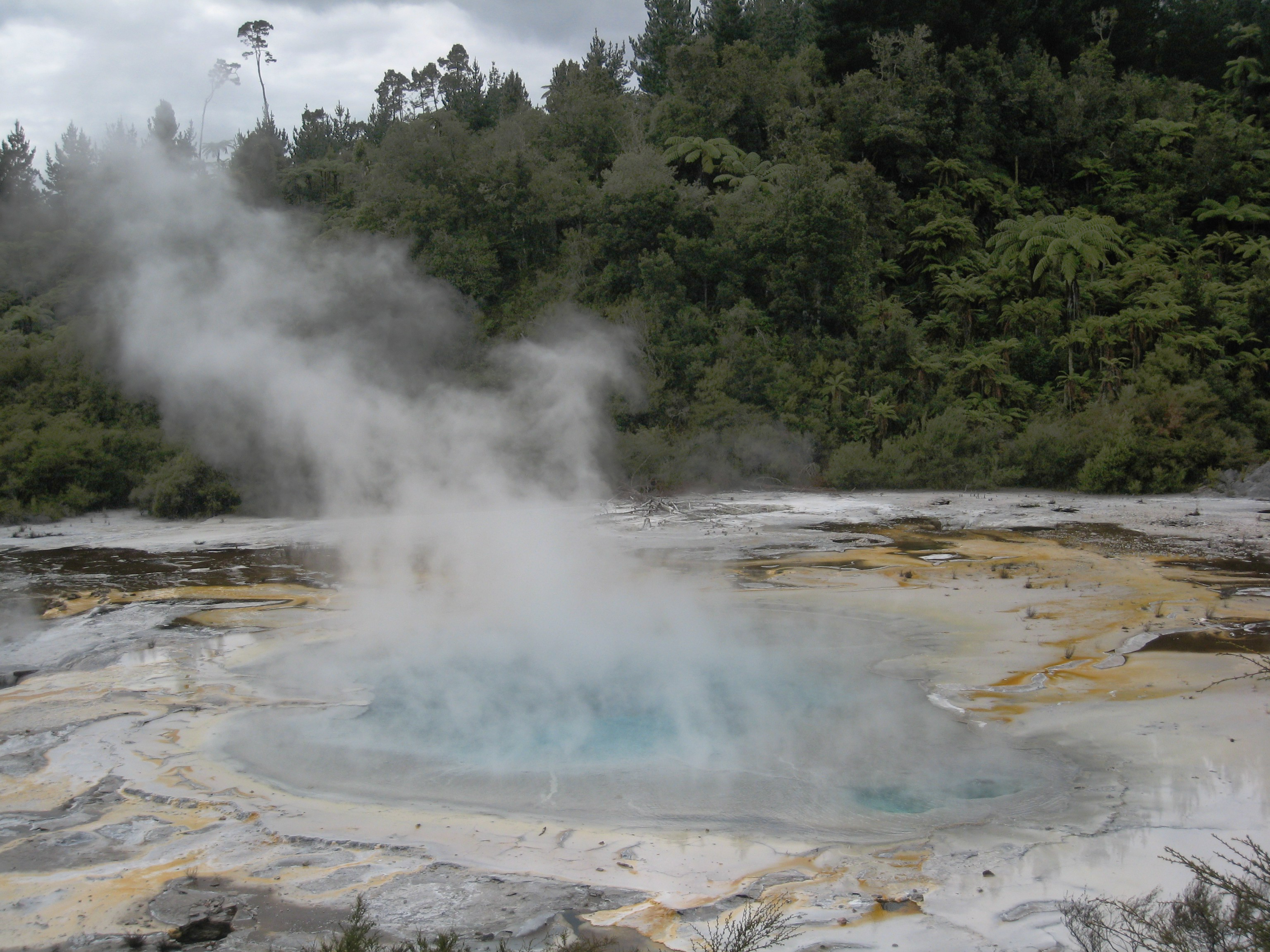
A hot pool on the Artist's Palette.

The lowest terrace at Orakei Korako is the jade-green Emerald Terrace, the largest of its kind in New Zealand since the presumed destruction of the famed Pink and White Terraces in the Mount Tarawera eruption of 1886. However, researchers recently rediscovered the Pink and White Terrace locations. In peak wet conditions up to 20 million litres of silica-enriched water per day may flow over the terrace and into Lake Ohakuri.

The Emerald Terrace continues 35 metres under the lake, which was formed for hydropower generation in 1961. This raised the Waikato River level by 18 metres at Orakei Korako, flooding approximately 200 alkaline hot springs and 70 geysers (or two-thirds of the active thermal area). Some of these thermal features still discharge, with their presence evident as gas bubbles rising from the vents in the lake bed.

Despite the loss of so many of its thermal features under the artificial lake, Orakei Korako remains the largest geyser field in New Zealand, with up to 35 active geysers. The most famous of these is the Diamond Geyser, whose unpredictable eruptions can last from a few minutes to many hours, ejecting boiling water as high as nine metres.

The three terraces above the lakeside Emerald Terrace are great fault scarps formed by an earthquake in 131 AD, around the time when Lake Taupō (a supervolcano) was last erupting. They are mostly covered in hot water algae, or cyanobacteria, which grows in temperatures between 35 and 59 degrees Celsius (95–138.2 degree Fahrenheit), the colours dependent on the species, with green, yellow and black the most common.

At the base of the two lower terraces – named Rainbow and Cascade Terraces – are several small geysers, including the intermittently active Sapphire Geyser, and the Hochstetter Pool (named after Austrian pioneer geologist Ferdinand von Hochstetter, who visited the area in 1859), which erupted in November 1954 and played as a geyser until mid-1955, ceasing suddenly after swarms of subterranean earthquakes.

The third and largest great fault scarp in the valley is called the Golden Fleece Terrace (named Te Kapua by the Māori people, meaning "The Cloud"), which is five metres high and 40 metres long, with a beautiful white crystal-like sinter coating. At the base are numerous vents where geysers have come and gone over the years, with the most recent, Wairiri Geyser.

Atop this terrace is the Artist's Palette, a 10,000 m^{2} silica sinter terrace covered with clear blue alkali chloride pools and irregularly erupting geysers. To one side of this topmost terrace a new geyser began to erupt in 2001, possibly the beginnings of a further terrace.

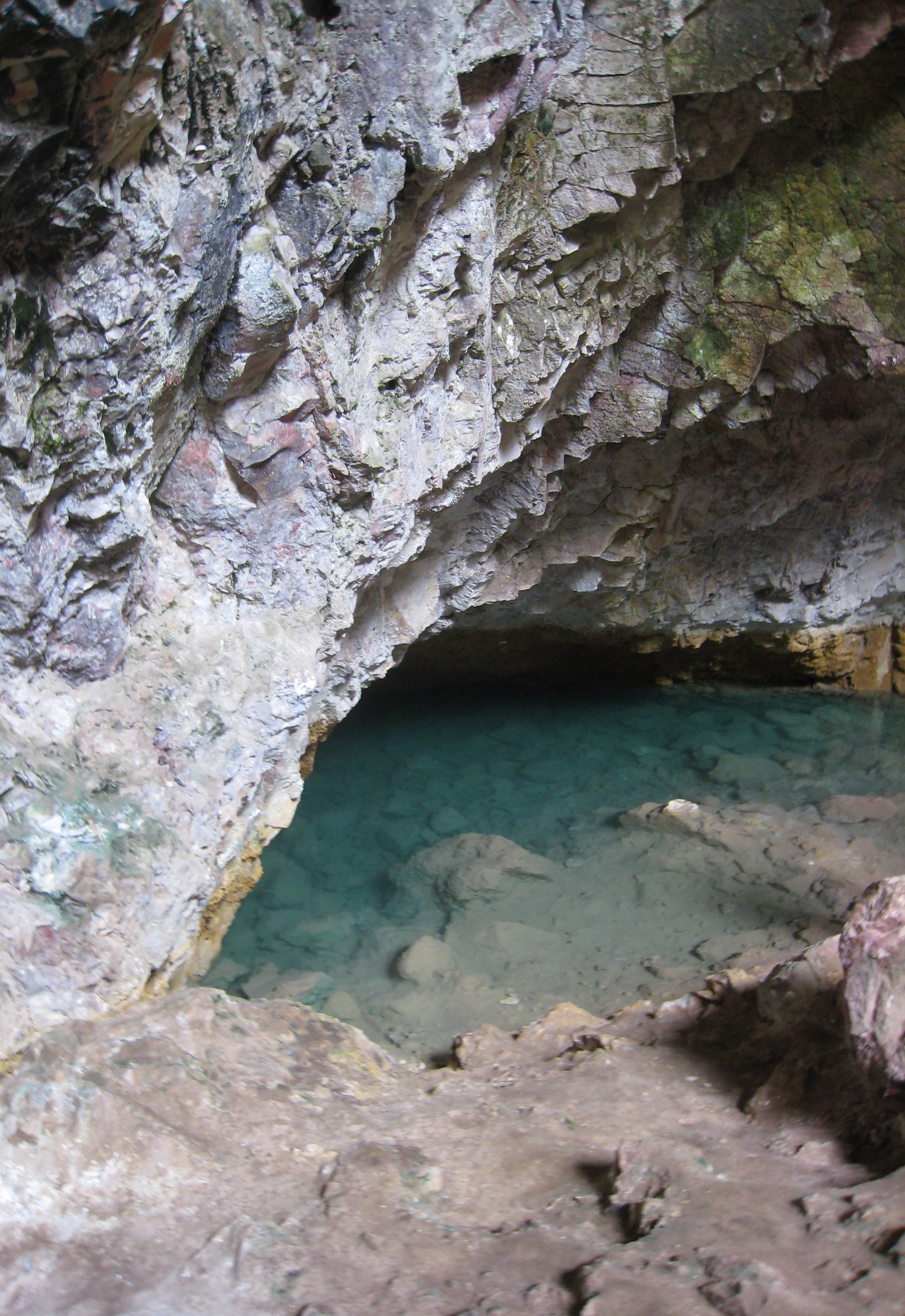
Ruatapu Cave.

Also at Orakei Korako is the Ruatapu Cave, one of only two caves in the world known to exist in a geothermal field. The cave extends 45 metres, with a vertical drop of 23 metres, to a shallow pool of clear, sulfate-rich, warm acid water. (The pool's chemical composition gives it the unique ability to clean jewellery.)

Another notable feature at Orakei Korako is the Soda Fountain, which burst into life in 1984 after a 17-year dormancy.

To the south of this feature, high atop a cliff above Lake Ohakuri, are three further geysers, Kurapai, Ellan Vannin and Benedix Washer Geysers, in an area not accessible to the public because it is too dangerous. Temperatures of 100 degrees Celsius (212 degree Fahrenheit) have been recorded here just 100 to 150 mm below the ground. Of these geysers, Kurapai Geyser is the most significant, and can sometimes be seen erupting from across the lake in the visitor's centre.

The Orakei Korako geothermal system now has some protection from further development, although the nearby Ngatamariki Geothermal Development at Tahorakuri gained resource consent in 2010 despite its possible effects on Orakei Korako.
