= Ngawha Springs =

- Interactive map of Ngawha Springs
- Coordinates: 35.409°S 173.860°E
- Country: New Zealand
- Region: Northland Region
- District: Far North District
- Ward: Kaikohe/Hokianga
- Community: Kaikohe-Hokianga
- Subdivision: Kaikohe
- Electorates: Northland; Te Tai Tokerau

Government
  - Territorial Authority: Far North District Council
  - Regional council: Northland Regional Council
  - Mayor of Far North: Moko Tepania
  - Northland MP: Grant McCallum
  - Te Tai Tokerau MP: TBD

Area
  - Total: 3.67 km^{2} (1.42 sq mi)

Population (June 2025)
  - Total: 210
  - Density: 57/km^{2} (150/sq mi)

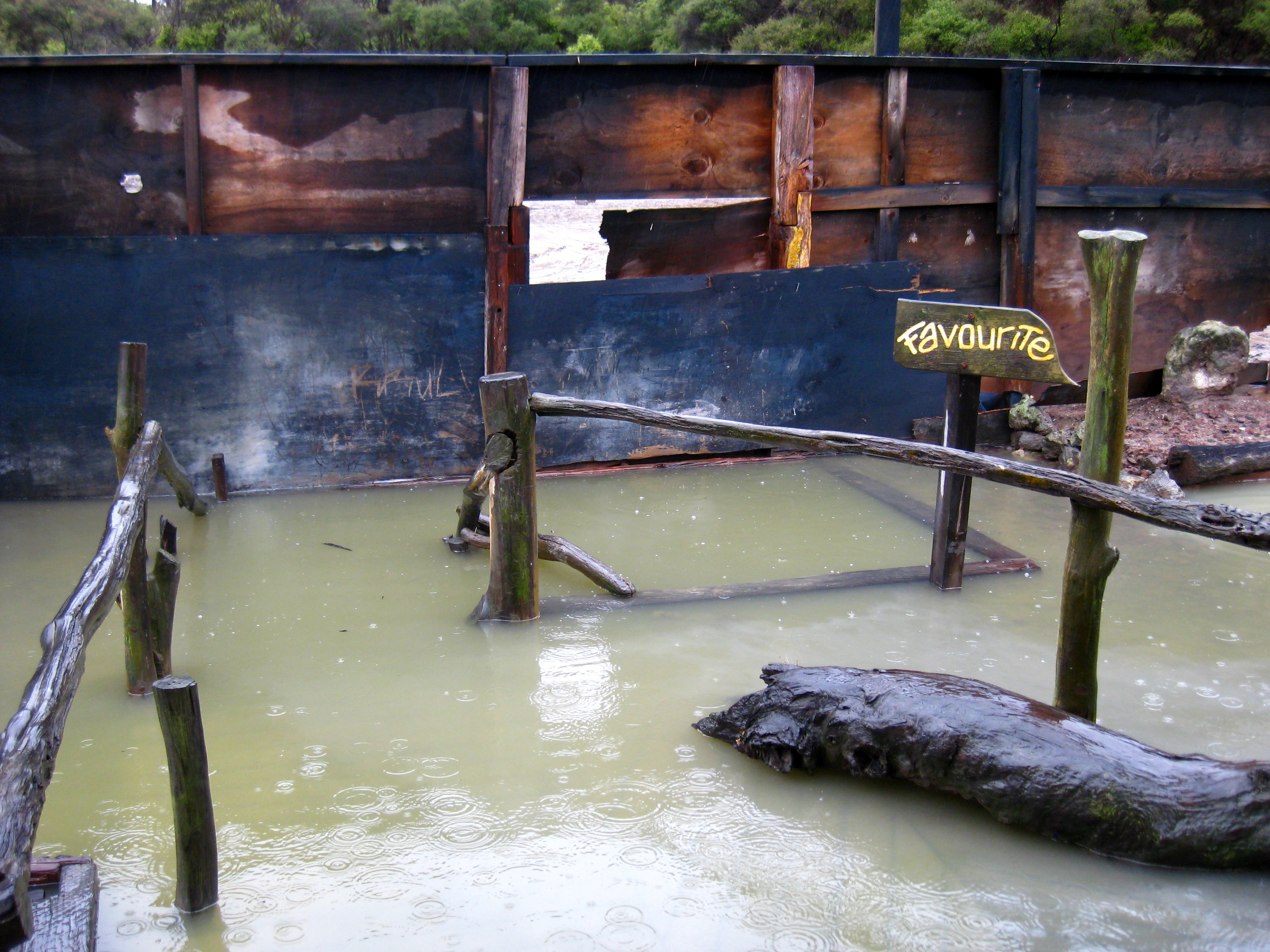
The Favourite pool in 2011

Ngawha Springs (Māori: Ngāwhā) is a small settlement and hot water springs approximately five kilometres east of the town of Kaikohe in Northland, New Zealand. Ngāwhā means "boiling spring".

The springs reputedly have therapeutic, balneological properties for those who bathe in their waters, and is the source of the steam used at the Ngawha geothermal field's power station.

== Hot springs ==
The main Ngāwhā Springs pool complex has 16 public pools and 8 private pools. The pools vary in temperature from the rather cool 32 °C / 89 °F to the extremely hot "Favourite" and "Doctor". The complex was refurbished in 2020–21, including a new building with changing rooms, a cafe, ticket office, shop and rooms for health practitioners. The previous major upgrade of facilities had been in the late 1970s.

The nearby Ginns Ngawha Spa was closed in 2015, then reopened temporarily while Ngāwhā Springs was being refurbished in 2020–21. The two complexes are managed by the Parahirahi Ngāwhā Waiariki Trust.

== Geology ==
The Ngawha kauri tree found nearby bears marks of the Laschamp event.

== Demographics ==
Statistics New Zealand describes Ngāwhā Springs as a rural settlement. It covers 3.67 km^{2} (1.42 sq mi) and had an estimated population of 210 as of June 2025, with a population density of 57 people per km^{2}. The settlement is part of the larger Ngapuhi statistical area.

Historical population
Year	Pop.	±% p.a.
2006	132	—
2013	123	−1.00%
2018	147	+3.63%
2023	189	+5.15%

Ngāwhā Springs had a population of 189 in the 2023 New Zealand census, an increase of 42 people (28.6%) since the 2018 census, and an increase of 66 people (53.7%) since the 2013 census. There were 90 males and 99 females in 63 dwellings. 3.2% of people identified as LGBTIQ+. The median age was 29.7 years (compared with 38.1 years nationally). There were 54 people (28.6%) aged under 15 years, 42 (22.2%) aged 15 to 29, 78 (41.3%) aged 30 to 64, and 15 (7.9%) aged 65 or older.

People could identify as more than one ethnicity. The results were 23.8% European (Pākehā), 90.5% Māori, and 6.3% Pasifika. English was spoken by 96.8%, Māori language by 31.7%, and Samoan by 1.6%. No language could be spoken by 3.2% (e.g. too young to talk). New Zealand Sign Language was known by 1.6%. The percentage of people born overseas was 4.8, compared with 28.8% nationally.

Religious affiliations were 22.2% Christian, 4.8% Māori religious beliefs, 1.6% New Age, and 1.6% other religions. People who answered that they had no religion were 63.5%, and 9.5% of people did not answer the census question.

Of those at least 15 years old, 9 (6.7%) people had a bachelor's or higher degree, 90 (66.7%) had a post-high school certificate or diploma, and 27 (20.0%) people exclusively held high school qualifications. The median income was $27,300, compared with $41,500 nationally. 6 people (4.4%) earned over $100,000 compared to 12.1% nationally. The employment status of those at least 15 was that 45 (33.3%) people were employed full-time, 18 (13.3%) were part-time, and 9 (6.7%) were unemployed.
