= Nga Awa Purua Power Station =

Power station near Taupō, New Zealand

- Country: New Zealand
- Location: north of Taupō
- Coordinates: 38°36′51″S 176°11′02″E
- Status: Operational
- Construction began: May 2008
- Commission date: May 2010
- Construction cost: NZ$430 million
- Owner: Mercury Energy / Tauhara North No. 2 Trust joint venture
- Operator: Mercury Energy

Geothermal power station
- Type: Flash steam
- Wells: 10
- Max. well depth: 2,500 m (8,200 ft)

Power generation
- Units operational: 1× 140 MW
- Nameplate capacity: 140 MW
- Capacity factor: 90%
- Annual net output: 1100 GWh

External links
- Website: Nga Awa Purua - Mercury Energy

Nga Awa Purua, also known as Rotokawa II, is a geothermal power station located near Taupō in New Zealand. The project was developed by Mighty River Power (now Mercury Energy). Nga Awa Purua is New Zealand's second largest geothermal power station and the steam turbine is the largest geothermal turbine in the world.

The power station is a joint venture between Mercury Energy (75%) and the Tauhara North No 2 Trust (25%), who represent about 800 owners affiliated to Ngati Tahu. The $430 million project first generated electricity on 18 January 2010, and was officially opened by Prime Minister John Key on 15 May 2010.

The Rotokawa Power Station is nearby.

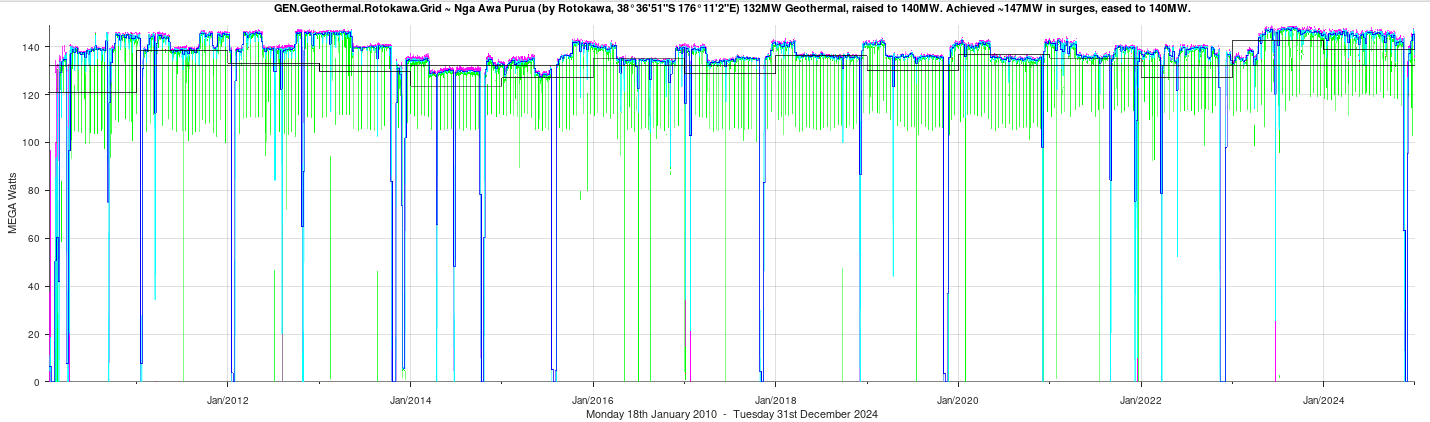
Electricity Generation at Nga Awa Purua.

== See also ==
- List of power stations in New Zealand
