= List of dams and reservoirs in New Zealand =

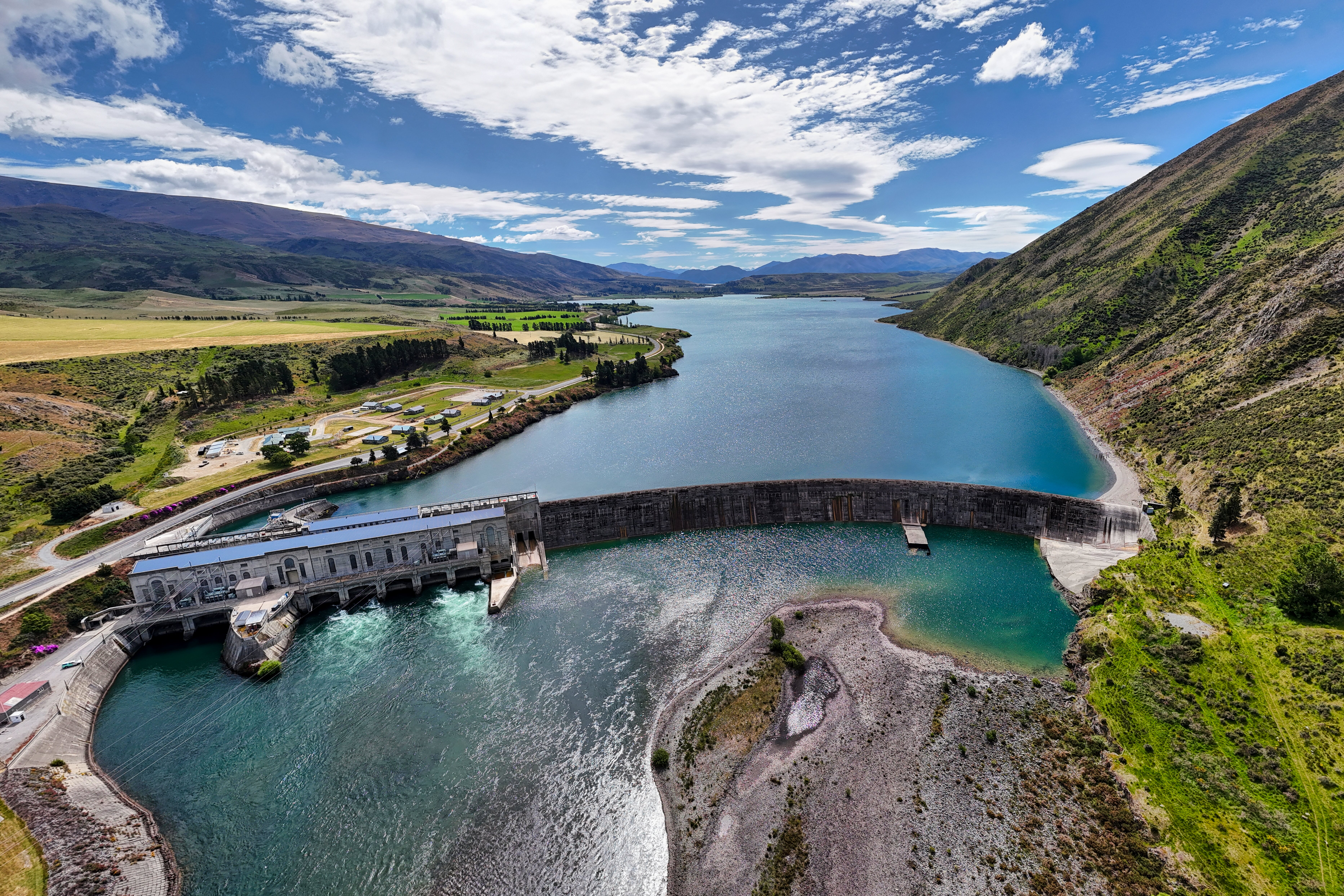
Waitaki Dam

Many of the largest dams and reservoirs in New Zealand have been developed principally to produce hydroelectricity. Other uses include irrigation and municipal water supply.

== Hydro-electric dams ==
The main river systems comprising a series of dams and powerhouses are situated on the following rivers:

The Waikato River
The Waitaki River
The Clutha River

Other schemes are stand alone developments associated with specific sites.

=== Tongariro Power Scheme ===
The Tongariro Power Scheme (1,400 GWh) diverts water from the south side of Mount Ruapehu and the west and north sides of Tongariro into Lake Taupō, and thus eventually into the Waikato River.

- Rangipo (cavern) (120 MW)
- Tokaanu (240 MW)
- Moawhango Dam

=== The Waikato ===
The hydro stations, starting from Lake Taupō, are (capacity in MW and nominal annual energy output in GWh):

- Aratiatia (84 MW) (331 GWh)
- Ohakuri (112 MW) (400 GWh)
- Atiamuri (84 MW) (305 GWh)
- Whakamaru (100 MW) (486 GWh)
- Maraetai (360 MW) (855 GWh)
- Waipapa (51 MW) (330 GWh)
- Arapuni (171 MW) (805 GWh)
- Karapiro (90 MW) (490 GWh)

=== The Waitaki ===
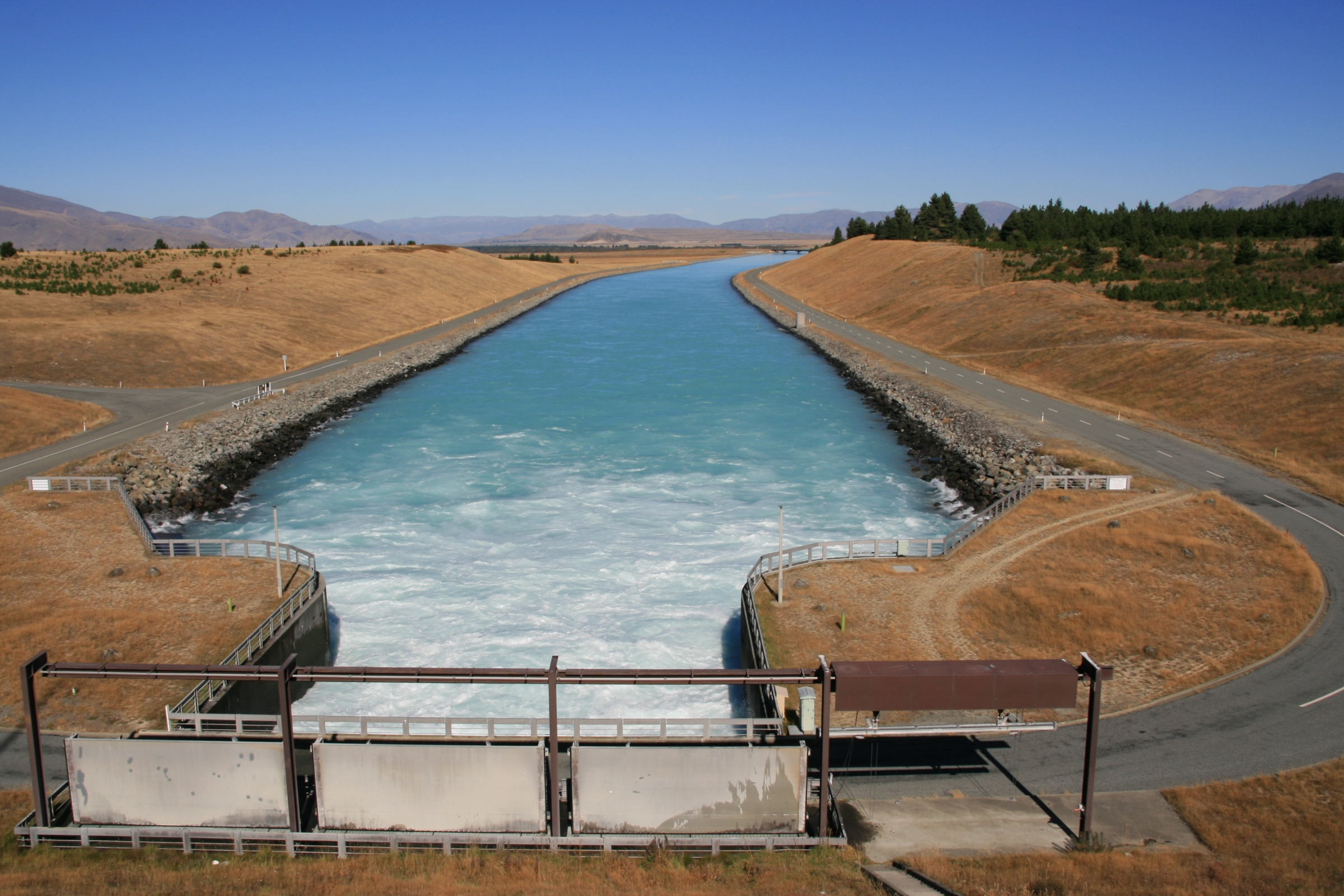
The control gates of Lake Pukaki

The river was developed in multiple stages. The Waitaki Dam was built first, without earthmoving machinery, followed by the development of the Aviemore Dam on Lake Aviemore and Benmore Dam on Lake Benmore. Lake Pukaki was initially dammed at this stage to provide storage and flow control. A small station was also installed on Lake Tekapo, but although it has a small dam to raise the pre-existing lake, water was taken through a 1.6 km (1 mi) tunnel to a powerstation below the level of the lake.

In the 1960s, work was started on the Upper Waitaki project. This project consisted of taking the discharge from the original Tekapo (A) station through a power canal, the Tekapo Canal, to Tekapo B station at the edge of Lake Pukaki. The dam at Pukaki was increased in height. Water from Pukaki is then transferred into the Pukaki Canal which meets the Ōhau Canal from Lake Ōhau into Ōhau A station and Lake Ruataniwha. The Ōhau Canal continues beyond Lake Ruataniwha to Ōhau B midway along, before emptying through Ōhau C into Lake Benmore.

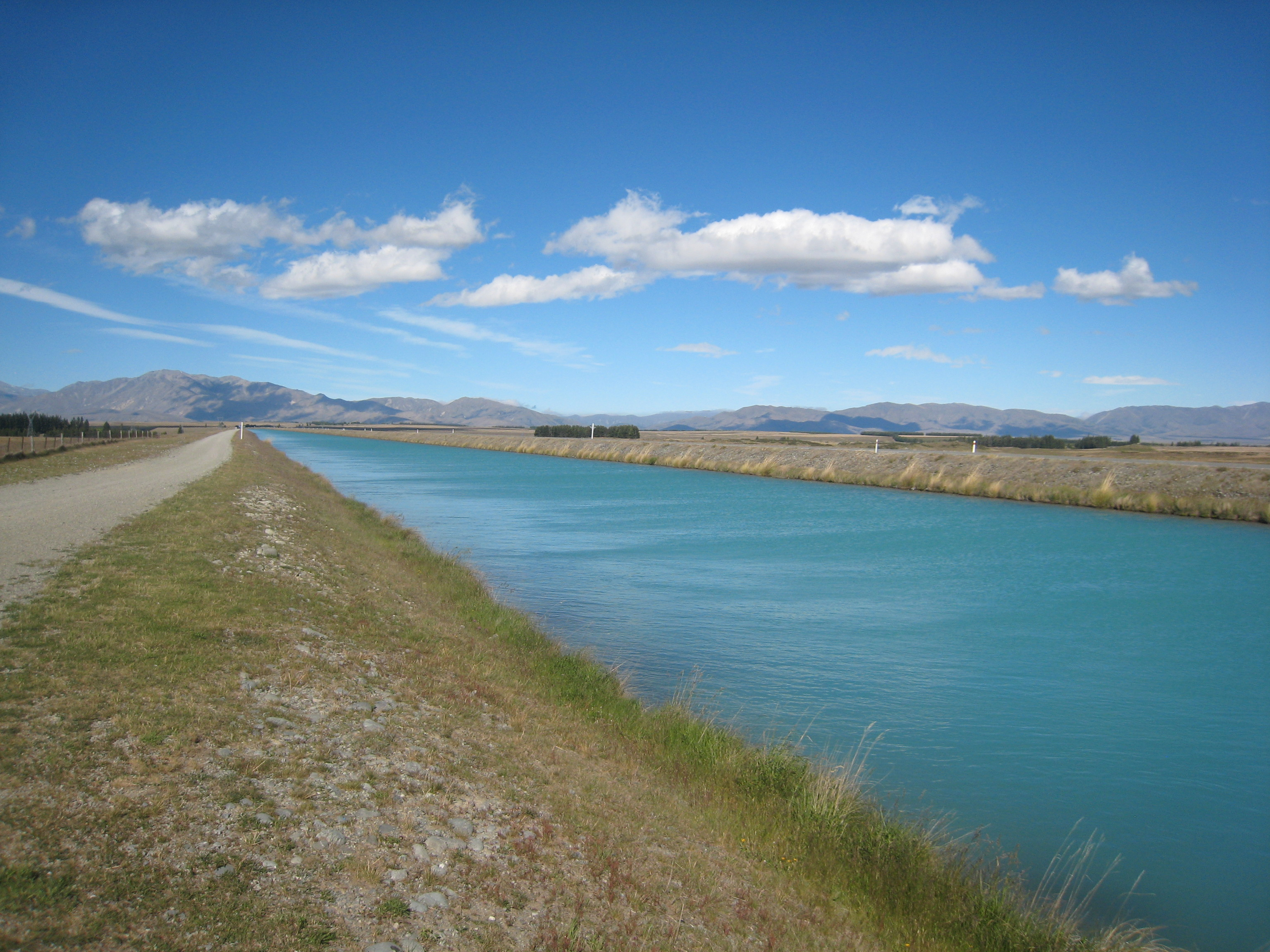
Tekapo Canal

The stations are (capacity) (annual output) (commissioned)

- Tekapo A (25 MW) (160 GWh) 1955
- Tekapo B (160 MW) (800 GWh) 1977
- Ōhau A (264 MW) (1150 GWh) 1980
- Ōhau B (212 MW) (970 GWh) 1984/1985
- Ōhau C (212 MW) (970 GWh) 1984/1985

The original Waitaki power stations discharge water back into the Waitaki River which then forms a storage lake for the next station in the chain. The three power stations are:

- Benmore (540 MW) (2,200 GWh) 1965
- Aviemore (220 MW) (940 GWh) 1968
- Waitaki (105 MW) (500 GWh) 1935

Project Aqua was a proposed scheme of six dams on a man made canal running from the Waitaki Dam to the sea. It was cancelled by Meridian Energy on 29 March 2004.

=== Clutha River ===
- Clyde Dam (445 MW)
- Roxburgh Dam (320 MW)

=== Standalone hydroelectric schemes ===
- Manapouri (850 MW) (4,800 GWh)

Manapouri does not rely on a high dam to provide water – it takes advantage of the natural 178-metre height difference between Lake Manapouri and the sea at Deep Cove in Doubtful Sound, in Fiordland. The power house is in a cavern, while two tailrace tunnels take the water from the power house 10 km (6 mi) to Deep Cove and the sea. The Manapouri Control Structure (Mararoa dam) downstream from the original outlet of Lake Manapouri controls the lake level, and feeds water from the Mararoa river back up the river into the Lake.

==== Other schemes ====
===== North Island =====
- Kaimai Scheme – Kaimai (0.4 MW), Lloyd Mandeno (15.6 MW), Lower Mangapapa (6.25 MW), Ruahihi (20 MW) – Scheme: (165 GWh)
- Aniwhenua Dam (25 MW) (127 GWh) – Bay of Plenty (Upriver from Matahina dam)
- Matahina Dam (36 MW) (300 GWh) – on the Rangitaiki River, Bay of Plenty
- Lake Waikaremoana Scheme – 3 dams: Kaitawa (36 MW), Tuai (60 MW), and Piripaua (42 MW)
- Wheao & Flaxy (26 MW) (115 GWh)
- Hinemaiaia – A (2.25 MW), B (1.35 MW), C (2.85 MW) – (30 GWh) – near Taupō
- Motukawa (4.6 MW) (25.8 GWh) – Taranaki
- Mangorei (4.5 MW) (20.9 GWh) – Taranaki
- Patea Dam (31 MW) (115 GWh) (Peak Station) – Taranaki
- Mangahao Dam (30 MW) – Tararuas
- Kourarau Scheme (1 MW) – Wairarapa

===== South Island =====
- Waihopai (2.5 MW) (11.8 GWh)
- Branch River – (Wairau & Argyle Stations) (11 MW) (54.3 GWh) – run of river canals
- Cobb Reservoir and Cobb Power Station (32 MW) – Golden Bay
- Arnold Dam (3 MW) (25 GWh) – West Coast
- Dillmans (0.5 MW), Duffers (3.5 MW), Kumara (6.5 MW) – Scheme: (47.9 GWh)
- Kaniere Forks (0.43 MW) (3.75 GWh) & MacKays Creek (1.1 MW) (8 GWh)
- Wahapo (3.1 MW) (14.5 GWh) – South Westland
- Lake Coleridge (45 MW) (205 to 300 GWh) – Canterbury – diverted rivers and natural lake
- Highbank (25.2 MW) (115 GWh) – Canterbury – joint power & irrigation
- Montalto (1.1 MW – 1.8 MW) (12 GWh) – Canterbury – joint power & irrigation
- Opuha Dam (7.5 MW) – Canterbury – joint power & irrigation
- Paerau (10 MW, 47.8 GWh) & Patearoa (2.25 MW, 7.5 GWh) – Taieri River, Otago – joint power & irrigation
- Waipori – 4 dams (12 MW, 57 MW, 7 MW, 8 MW) – Dunedin
- Monowai (6 MW) (34 GWh)
- Roaring Meg – 2 power stations (1.3MW, 3MW) (30 GWh)

== Municipal water supply dams ==
=== Auckland ===
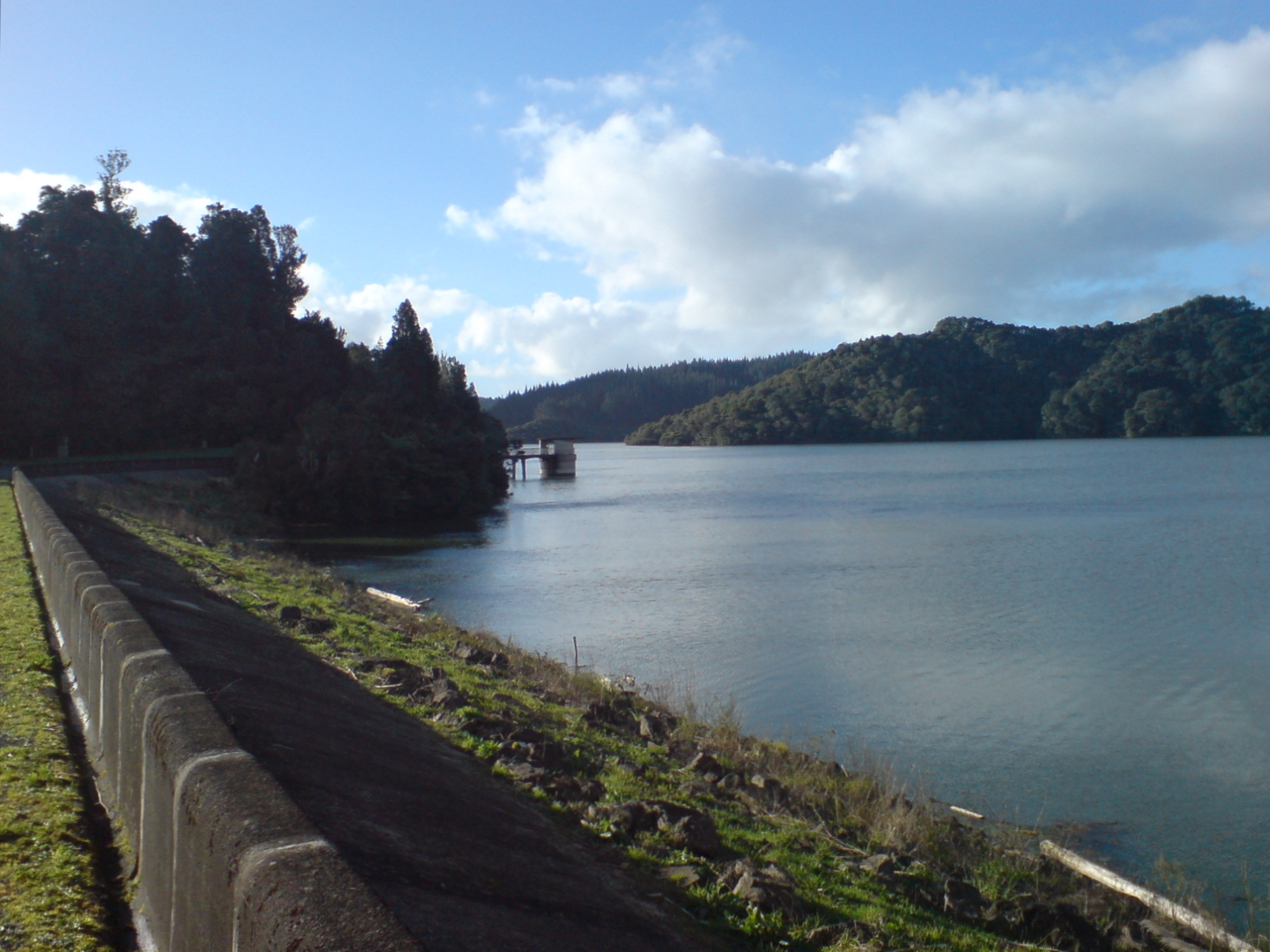
Cosseys Dam in the Hunua Ranges, part of Auckland's water supply system

- Cosseys Dam – Auckland
- Hays Creek Dam – Auckland
- Upper Huia Dam – Auckland
- Lower Huia Dam – Auckland
- Mangatangi Dam – Auckland
- Mangatawhiri Dam – Auckland
- Upper Nihotupu Dam – Auckland
- Lower Nihotupu Dam – Auckland
- Waitākere Dam and Reservoir – Auckland
- Wairoa Dam – Auckland

=== Other North Island ===
- Clapcott Concrete Arch (Mangapoike or Gisborne No. 1) Dam - Gisborne
- Kaitoke Weir – Upper Hutt
- Macaskill Lakes – Upper Hutt
- Mangamahoe Dam - New Plymouth
- Okehu Stream/Waitahinga Dam (Rangitatau Weir) - Wanganui (Whanganui)
- Upper and Lower Turitea - Palmerston North
- Whau Valley Dam – Whangarei
- Wilsons Dam – Whangarei

=== South Island ===
- Waitohi (Barnes) Dam - Picton
- Maitai Dam - Nelson
- Opuha Dam – Canterbury, also has small hydro-electric scheme (7.5 MW)
- Ross Creek Reservoir – Dunedin
- Sullivan's Dam – Dunedin

=== Defunct dams ===
- Birchville Dam – Upper Hutt
- Johnsonville Waterworks - Ohariu Valley
- Korokoro Dam
- Morton Dam - Wainuiomata
- Upper and Lower Karori Dams and the Karori Reservoirs – Wellington (now a nature reserve)
- Teviot Dam - Roxburgh
- Waitohi Weir (1891) - Picton
- Williams Dam - Picton

== Irrigation dams ==
- Lakes Manuwai and Waingaro at Kerikeri, purpose-built irrigation dams containing 12,800,000 m3 of water
- Opuha Dam

== See also ==
- Rivers of New Zealand
- Lakes in New Zealand
- List of lakes in New Zealand
- List of power stations in New Zealand
- Lake Benmore
- Lake Aviemore
- Lake Ruataniwha
- Lake Waitaki
