= Patea (disambiguation) =

Pātea is a town in the South Taranaki District, New Zealand.

Patea or Pātea can also refer to:

== Places related to the New Zealand town ==
- Doubtful Sound / Patea, fjord
- Pātea Dam, hydroelectric dam
- Patea (electorate), former electorate from 1893 to 1963
- Pātea River

== People ==
- Luron Patea (born 2004), Samoan-Australian rugby league football prop
- Tuisa Tasi Patea, Samoan politician
