= Manawa Energy =

New Zealand electric utility company

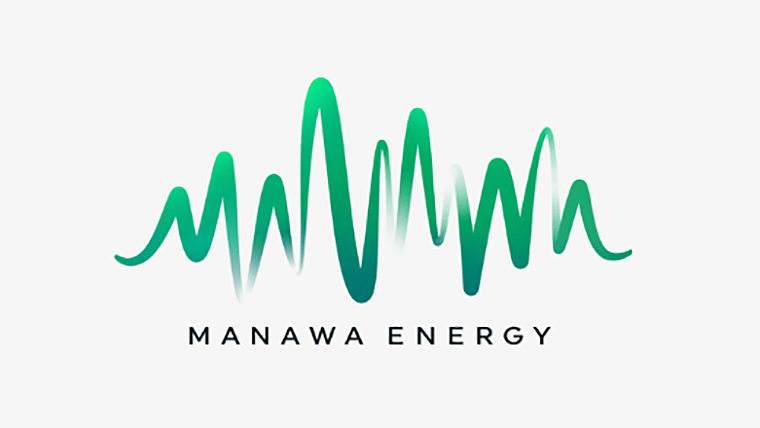
- Type: Subsidiary
- Traded as: NZX: MNW
- Industry: Energy
- Founded: 1993
- Headquarters: Tauranga, New Zealand
- Services: Electricity
- Revenue: NZ$444m (2023)
- Net income: NZ$129m (2023)
- Total assets: NZ$2,329m (2023)
- Total equity: NZ$1,435m (2023)
- Owner: Contact Energy
- Number of employees: 250 (2023)
- Website: www.manawaenergy.co.nz

Manawa Energy limited (formerly Trustpower) is a New Zealand electricity generation company that offers bespoke electricity products to commercial and industrial customers across New Zealand. Manawa energy currently operate 26 power schemes, from the Bay of Plenty in the north to Otago in the south.

The company is listed on the New Zealand stock exchange, but its ownership structure is dominated by its two major shareholders: Infratil which owns 51.0% and the Tauranga Energy Consumer Trust (TECT) which owns 26.8%. The remaining 22.2% is widely held.

Mercury NZ Limited acquired Trustpower Limited’s retail business for the final acquisition price of $467 million. The acquisition will double Mercury’s total customer connections. Trustpower’s retail business sells electricity, gas, fixed and wireless broadband, and mobile phone services, totalling approximately 416,000 connections. The combined business will have approximately 787,000 connections creating New Zealand’s leading multi-product utilities retail business. Mercury Chief Executive Vince Hawksworth says that Mercury and Trustpower customers will continue to receive the same high standard of service they’ve known from both retail brands.

Manawa Energy was acquired by Contact Energy in July 2025.

== History ==
=== Tauranga city ===
In 1913, the Tauranga Borough Council applied to the Department of Lands to have the Omanawa Falls vested in their body corporate for the purposes of water power generation. They also applied under section 268 of the Public Works Act 1908 for a licence to generate electricity.

In October 1914, the Public Works Department gave its approval for water to be taken from the Omanawa River to generate electricity and circulate it throughout the borough and surrounding area.

With plans underway to build its new Omanawa Falls Power Station the Tauranga Borough Council established on 5 October 1914 a municipal electricity department to market and distribute the electricity that would be produced by the new station. Its supply area ranged from the causeway bridges leading through the town, 17th Avenue in the south to Sulphur Point in the north, a total of 210 square miles (544 square km).

In 1915 the borough council hired Lloyd Mandeno as its electrical engineer, with responsibility not only for building the distribution system that will take power from the new power station but also to convince the population of 1,540 to give up their candles, kerosene lamps and town gas for the new untried electricity.

By 1924 68 homes out of the 700 in the borough were using electric cooking.

Lloyd Mandeno was made chief electrical engineer in 1917.

Local citizen R. S. Ready was so sure of the advantages of electricity that he built on 5th Avenue the first house in New Zealand that relied solely on electricity. Mandeno designed a hot water cylinder for the house, that was built from galvanized iron insulated with 150 mm of pumice. Within four years the council had expanded its reticulation to supply rural areas as far as Gate Pa, Otumoetai, Papamoa and Oropi.

By 1923 the department had 845 customers generating a revenue of £10,470.

In 1921 Lloyd Mandeno undertook some investigations and proposed that the borough consider building a new power station using the head generated by fall on the Wairoa River. With demand increasing the borough council agreed to build what became the McLaren Falls power station. This began generating on 25 June 1925. The falls and the power station were to named after a couple who operated a cookhouse during construction and whose son had been killed in World War I.

In addition to his duties as an employee of the Tauranga electricity department, Mandeno was also a consultant to Te Puke Town Board and the newly constituted Tauranga Power Board. In 1925 Mandeno resigned after being accused of a conflict of interest by Tauranga's Mayor, Bradshaw Dive. He was replaced by Claude W. Boak as electrical and general engineer.

By 1928 the department had installed 232 water heaters and 120 electric stoves and was supplying 848 customers with a revenue of £22,116. With demand still continuing to increased through the 1930 the combined output of Omanawa Falls and McLaren Falls was proving insufficient. As a result, the electricity department was forced to arrange with the SHD to take supply from its Aongatete and Te Puke. In 1962 the department began using underground cabling systems in new subdivisions.

In the same decade the department decided to proceed with construction of two new power stations that utilised the waters of the Mangapapa and Wairoa Rivers, which had been designed by consultants Mandeno Chitty & Bell in whom Lloyd Mandeno was a principal. Approval to proceed was granted by the New Zealand government in 1963 continual upon the station's output being equally shared with the Tauranga Electric Power Board. As a result, the Tauranga Joint Generation Committee was established in 1965 to develop, control and sell electricity generation. As a result of this initiative the original two planned stations, the Lloyd Mandeno Power Station was commissioned in 1972, and the Ruahihi Power Station in 1981. In between these two dates an additional station, the Lower Mangapapa Power Station had been commissioned in April 1979. All three stations were operated as part of the Kaimai hydro power scheme. By 1981 the Tauranga Joint Generation Committee was making a profit of NZ$1.29 million and had 231 employees.

In 1989 the McLaren Falls Power Station was decommissioned.

Following the introduction of the Energy Companies Act in 1992, after consulting with local citizens the Tauranga City Council transferred the assets of its electricity department to the newly established Tauranga Electricity Ltd. The majority shareholder in the new company was the council owned Tauranga Civic Holdings Ltd, which held 5,099,994 shares with the remaining six shares in the company held by the public. In June 1993 Tauranga Civic Holdings Ltd took full control. By that year the company had 5,576 customers.

=== Tauranga Electric Power Board ===
Using the provisions of the Electric Power Boards Act of 1918 proposals were put to create a power board to supply the rural areas of the Bay of Plenty. As a result, the Tauranga Electric Power Board was established and held its first meeting on 13 September 1923. The following year a poll of ratepayers in the board's area which covered 667 square miles (1,753 km2), including the towns of Katikati, Mt Maunganui and Te Puke the board raised a loan of £110,000 to construct its distribution system. Rather than build its own power stations the board arranged to obtain its electricity from the Electricity Department of the Tauranga Borough Council.

Following his resignation from Tauranga Borough Council Lloyd Mandeno took up a position as general manager of the Tauranga Electric Power Board in January 1926. He was only in the position until he resigned on 25 May of that year, leaving the position in August, to go into private practice in Auckland. However the board retained him as their consulting engineer on an annual retaining fee of £250 plus travelling expenses, a position he retained until 1929. While involved with the power board he invented, developed and introduced into service the single wire earth return reticulation system. This allowed the board to reduce the cost of distributing electricity across its predominantly rural customer base.

In response to the State Hydro-Electric Department (SHD), introducing charging for peak demand the power board in 1952 introduced what is believed to have been the world's first automatic load control system. That same year the power board also began manufacturing pre-stressed concrete power poles. It is believed that it was one of the first power boards to do this in New Zealand. In 1958 the SHD was renamed the New Zealand Electricity Department (NZED). By the early 1990s the power board was supplying those areas the city of Tauranga, where it had expanded out of the defined city electricity department's geographical inner city area, the surrounding Tauranga country and the towns of Te Puke and Mt Maunganui. In 1990 it had a staff of 201, 43,158 customers and was making a profit of 2.55 million.

In response to the introduction of the Energy Companies Act in 1992, the Tauranga and Rotorua Electric Power Boards proposed to merge, but it was rejected both by the public and the government.

The power board investigated other options and in 1994 changed its name to Trustpower and its financial structure so that 50% of the ownership was held in a consumer trust, 49% was directly held by customers with the remaining 1% in an employee share ownership scheme.

On 18 April 1994 Trustpower listed on the New Zealand stock exchange. This allowed the specialist infrastructure and utility investor Infratil Ltd to acquire 11 million shares and become its largest shareholder. By this time it had approximately 40,000 customers as well as a half share in the Kaimai hydro power scheme. Meanwhile, the Rotorua Electric Power Board had also changed its financial structure to become the Rotorua Electricity Ltd. By 1995 Trustpower had built up a 67.7% shareholding in this new entity and in 1996 took full control.

In 1995 Trustpower purchased Taupo Electricity Limited and Taupo Generation Limited which gave it a total of 89,000 customers to make it New Zealand's fourth largest power company and third largest power generator.

=== Merger with Tauranga Electricity ===
While for many years the directors of Tauranga Electricity had been opposed to merging with other companies to create a Bay of Plenty wide energy company as they were of the opinion the resulting monopoly would push up prices. Eventually however the City Council after receiving many proposals over the years agreed to merge with Trustpower.

The merger which occurred on 31 October 1997 guaranteed that the City Council's shareholding in Trustpower would provide an annual revenue of NZ$3.3 million over the next five years.

By 1998 the addition of the Tauranga City's customers meant that new company was supplying 96,513 customers. In 1998 the state-owned Electricity Corporation of New Zealand sold five of its smaller hydro stations, of which Trustpower purchased Coleridge (NZ$91 million), Highbank/Montalto ($37 million) and Matahina ($115 million) hydro power stations.

=== 1998 electricity sector reforms ===
In 1998 the New Zealand Government passed the Electricity Industry Reform Act 1998 which was intended to change the structure of the electricity industry to encourage competition. This Act required the operational separation of lines and generation business activities by 1 July 1999 and separation of the ownership by 1 January 2004. As by now Trustpower had built up a substantial generation portfolio it elected to be a generator/retailer and so sold its lines and its contracting business, PowerLink Limited. Following a competitive sales process, TrustPower sold its lines business to United Networks Limited (formerly Power New Zealand) for $485 million. Trustpower also acquired the retail business from eight energy companies: Waipa Power, Wairoa Power, Marlborough Electric, Buller Electricity, Westpower, Electricity Ashburton, Central Electric, and Otago Power.

Using the proceeds of the sale of these businesses Trustpower began purchasing the generation assets being shed by those energy companies that had opted to be a lines company. This led to it purchasing the following hydro power stations and schemes: Arnold, Branch and Waihopai, Kumara, Mangorei, Motukawa, Paerau, Patearoa, Patea (for $72m) Wahapo, Waipori (for $70m) as well as the Tararua Wind Farm (for $49m). Thus by March 1999 it had 421.5 MW of installed capacity, capable of generating up to 1,769 GWh per annum.

In March 2003 Trustpower completed the purchase of the Cobb Power Station for $92.5m from NGC.

=== Share buyback ===
In 2003 Trustpower bought back some of its shares. Infratil did not participate in the buy-back, which lead to it increasing its shareholding to 33.5%. In 2006 Infratil purchased Allient Energy's shareholding for NZ$6.20 a share, which gave it 51% and thus majority control of Trustpower.

=== Expansion ===
In 2013, Trustpower bought Energy Direct, a Whanganui electricity and gas company.

In 2015, it bought 65% of King Country Energy Ltd from Nova Energy. King Country Energy generates all of its electricity from renewable sources (principally hydro-electric generation) and supplies electricity to the Waitomo, King Country and Ruapehu Districts. King Country Energy was incorporated in 1991.

On 18 December 2015, Trustpower announced that it was considering a process to demerge its wind assets in Australia and New Zealand, separating into two New Zealand incorporated listed companies by way of a Court-approved scheme of arrangement. The Demerger, effective on 31 October 2016, resulted in the creation of two new companies, Trustpower and Tilt Renewables. The demerger enables each business to focus on their respective areas of specialisation.

In 2018, Trustpower and King Country Electric Power Trust (KCEPT), assumed full ownership of King Country Energy Limited (KCE). This is the outcome of a joint venture takeover made by a wholly owned subsidiary of Trustpower and KCEPT, initiated in December 2017, that sought to acquire the balance of KCE's ordinary shares at $5 per share. Trustpower now controls 75% of KCE, with KCEPT controlling the remaining 25%. KCE sold its retail business to Trustpower in July 2018.

Trustpower sold its Australian hydro-power generation assets operator GSP Energy Pty Limited for A$168 million ($129.46 million), as the company focuses on its core New Zealand business.

=== Sale of the mass market retail business and name change ===
In May 2022, Trustpower sold its mass market retail business, retail customer base and the Trustpower brand to Mercury NZ Ltd. The company retained its hydro-electricity assets to become NZ's largest independent electricity generator, representing around 5% of the New Zealand generation capacity and changed their name to Manawa Energy, Manawa means ‘heart’ and it speaks to the heart of the company's operations in the Bay of Plenty. The name was gifted by Ngāti Hangarau hapū in the Kaimai area. It traces the company's origins back to the first hydro-electric power station on the Omanawa River. Trustpower continued to operate under the Trustpower brand and offer bundled services for power, gas, broadband and mobile, until the sale to Mercury Energy in May 2022 (when it was merged into the Mercury retail brand).

=== Acquisition by Contact Energy ===
In 2024, Contact Energy, New Zealand's largest gentailer, offered to acquire 100% of Manawa, and in June 2025 the acquisition was approved by the government and by Manawa shareholders. The deal raised concerns about increased market concentration and potential for anti-competitive behavior. Independent retailer Electric Kiwi argued that the deal will exacerbate existing problems in the electricity market, leading to higher prices and reduced choice. Ultimately, the Commerce Commission found that the merger "would not be likely to have the effect of substantially lessening competition in a market in New Zealand". The acquisition was completed on 11 July 2025.

== Power stations ==
Manawa Energy power stations in New Zealand
Scheme	Station	Type	Capacity	Commissioned	Location
	Bream Bay	diesel	9 MW	2011	Northland
Kaimai	Lloyd Mandeno	hydro	16 MW	1972	Bay of Plenty
Kaimai	Lower Mangapapa	hydro	5.6 MW	1979	Bay of Plenty
Kaimai	Ruahihi	hydro	20 MW	1981	Bay of Plenty
Kaimai	Kaimai 5	hydro	0.3 MW	1994	Bay of Plenty
Matahina	Matahina	hydro	80 MW	1967	Bay of Plenty
Wheao/Flaxy	Wheao / Flaxy	hydro	26 MW	1982	Bay of Plenty
Esk	Rimu	hydro	2.4 MW	2013	Hawke's Bay
	Toronui	hydro	1.4 MW	2013	Hawke's Bay
Hinemaiaia	Hinemaiaia	hydro	6 MW	1952	Waikato
Mangorei	Mangorei	hydro	4.5 MW	1906	Taranaki
Motukawa	Motukawa	hydro	5 MW	1927	Taranaki
Patea	Patea	hydro	31 MW	1984	Taranaki
Cobb	Cobb	hydro	32 MW	1944	Nelson
Branch	Argyle	hydro	11 MW	1983	Marlborough
Waihopai	Waihopai	hydro	2.4 MW	1927	Marlborough
Arnold	Arnold	hydro	3 MW	1932	West Coast
Kumara	Kumara	hydro	6.5 MW	1978	West Coast
Kumara	Dillmans	hydro	3.5 MW	1978	West Coast
Kumara	Duffers	hydro	0.5 MW	1980	West Coast
Kaniere	Kaniere Forks	hydro	0.4 MW	1909	West Coast
Kaniere	McKay's Creek	hydro	1.1 MW	1931	West Coast
Wahapo	Wahapo	hydro	3.1 MW	1960	West Coast
Coleridge	Coleridge	hydro	39 MW	1914	Canterbury
Highbank	Highbank	hydro	28 MW	1945	Canterbury
Highbank	Montalto	hydro	1.8 MW	1982	Canterbury
Paerau/Patearoa	Paerau	hydro	12 MW	1984	Otago
Waipori	Deep Stream	hydro	5 MW	2008	Otago
Waipori	Waipori	hydro	84 MW	1907	Otago

=== Decommissioned stations ===
The McLaren Falls Station on the Kaimai hydro power scheme was decommissioned in 1989 following the commissioning of the Ruahihi Power Station.

In 1998 Trustpower decommissioned the Omanawa Falls Power Station and gifted it to the Tauranga City Council.

== See also ==
- Electricity sector in New Zealand
- New Zealand electricity market
