= Arnold River (New Zealand) =

River on the West Coast of New Zealand

Coordinates: 42°26′S 171°22′E

Arnold River Kōtukuwhakaoka (Māori)
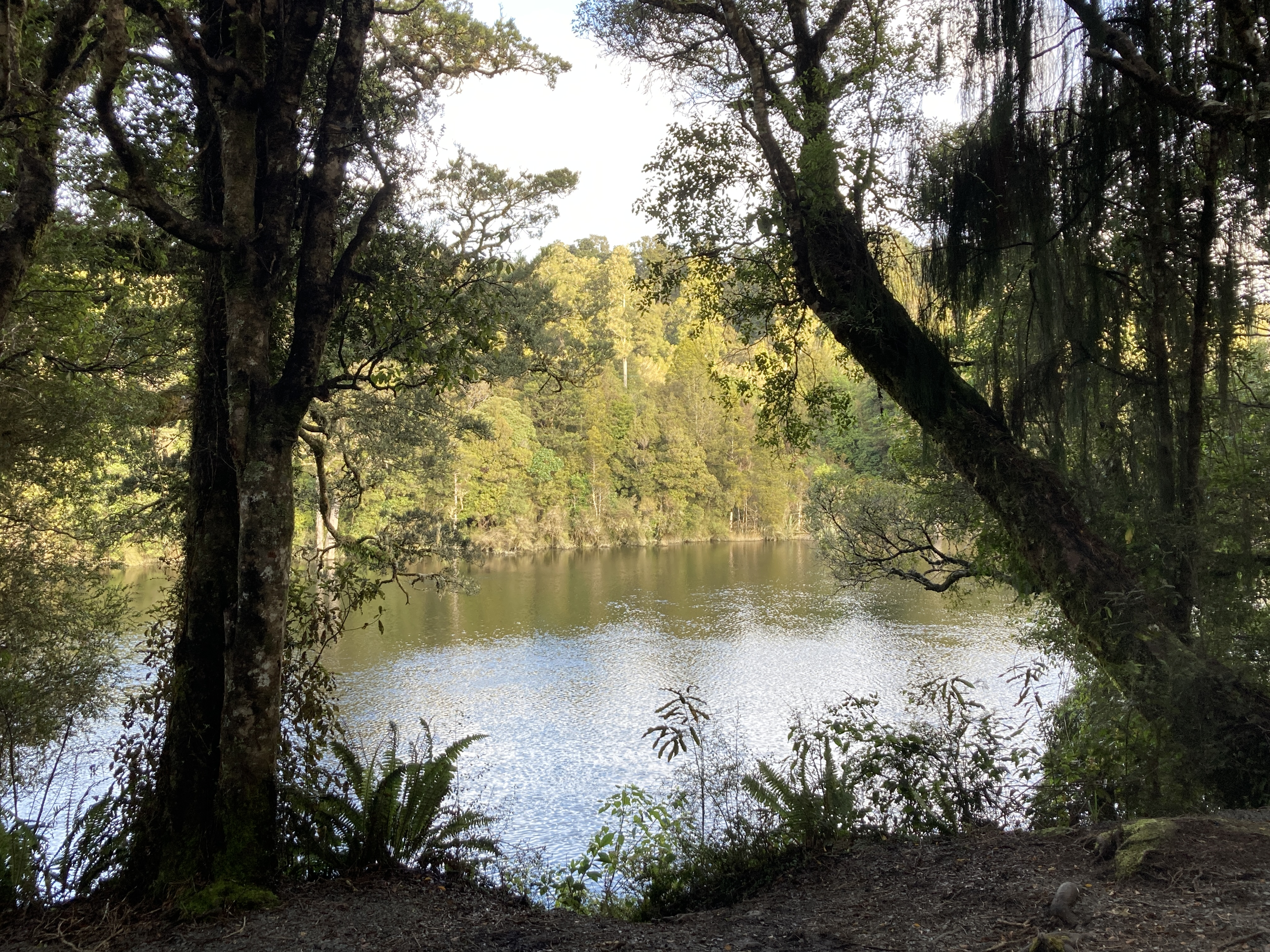
- Arnold River from the Rakaitane Walk
- Native name: Kōtukuwhakaoka (Māori)

Location
- Country: New Zealand
- Region: West Coast
- District: Grey District

Physical characteristics
- Source
  - location: Lake Brunner
- Mouth
  - location: Grey River

The Arnold River (Māori: Kōtukuwhakaoka) is a river on the West Coast of New Zealand's South Island. It is the outflow of Lake Brunner, which it links with the Grey River at Stillwater. The Arnold River flows northwest for 20 kilometres (12 mi), joining the Grey immediately above the town of Brunner, some 15 kilometres (9 mi) from the Tasman Sea. It is a popular spot for whitewater kayaking and trout fishing.

== Naming and early exploration ==
The river was known to Māori as Kōtukuwhakaoka, the name of a Māori chief from the North Island who had followed it upstream to the lake. According to legend, the chief was attacked and killed by a lake taniwha, which later became one of the two islands in the lake after it was in turn killed by his son. Explorer Thomas Brunner, who was the first European to travel up the river to its source, spelled it "Kotu-urakaoka" in the proclamation that in 1853 defined the provincial boundaries.

In 1859 surveyor John Rochfort and his men arrived at the opposite shore of the lake, which he proceeded to name after Brunner. They made a canoe from a hollowed-out kahikatea log and paddled across the lake to where flowed into the Kōtukuwhakaoka, which Rochfort named the "Arnould River". The name "Arnould" appears on maps in the 1860s, but from 1865 onwards the river was usually spelled "Arnold". Rochfort attempted to survey the "Arnould River" by canoe, but it was choked up with logs and snags, and the party eventually abandoned their vessel for "dreary marches in the midst of drenching rain."

== Power station ==
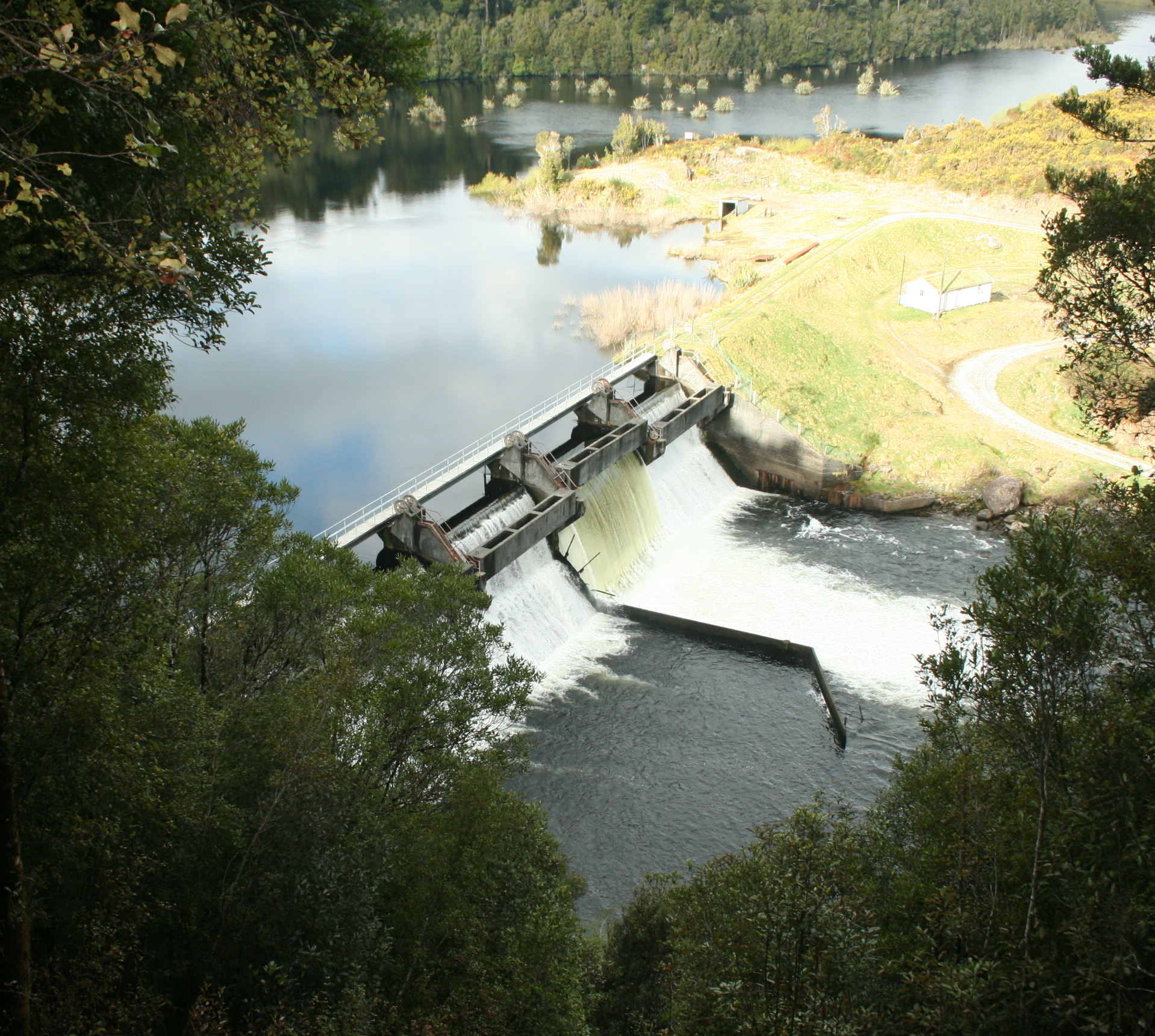
Arnold Power Station weir dam

The Arnold Power Station is on the river close to its confluence with the Grey. TrustPower, which operates the current hydroelectric station, has a proposal for another hydro-electricity scheme on the river.

== Bridge and walkway ==
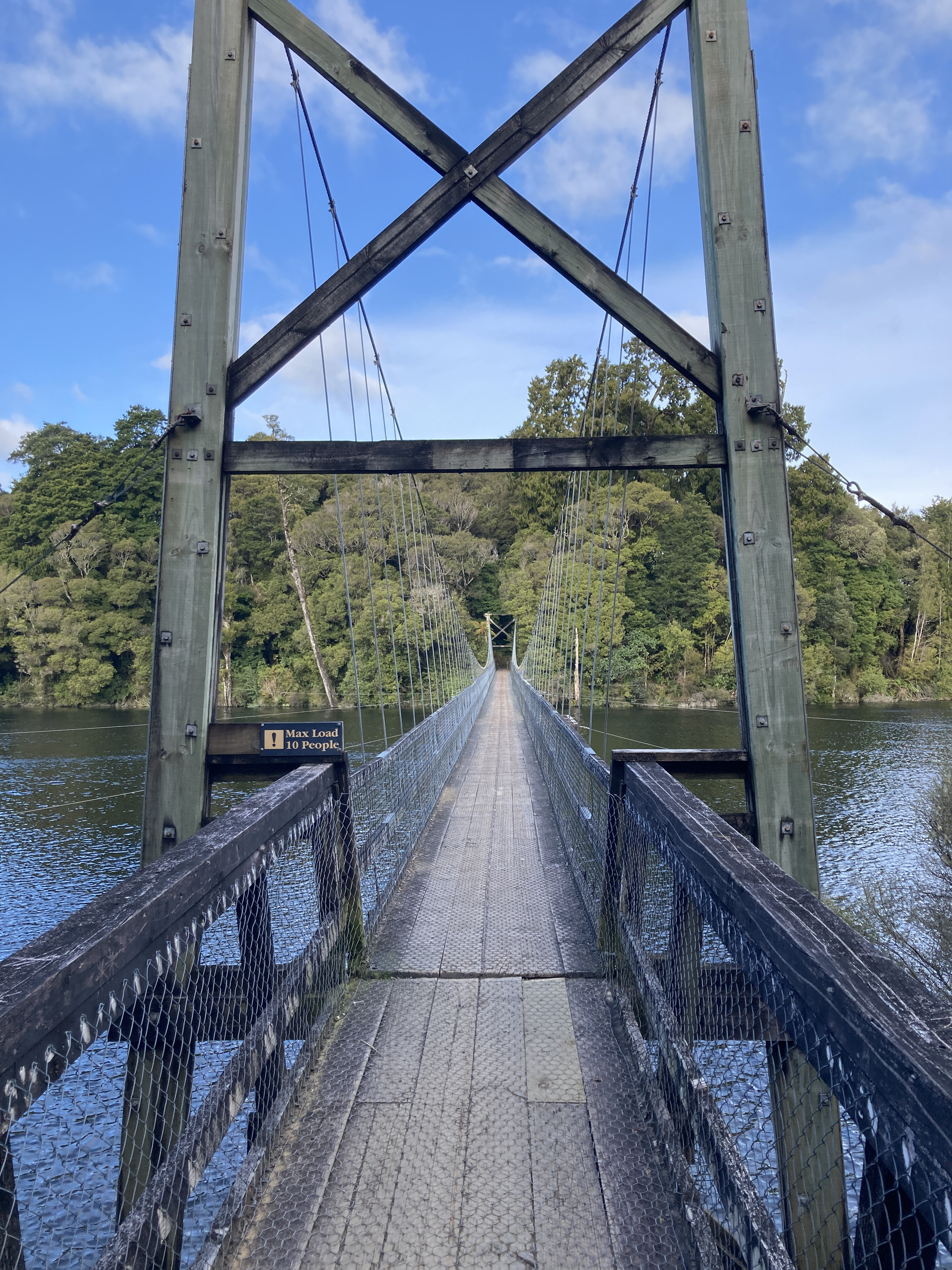
1990 footbridge across the Arnold River at Moana

In the early days of the settlement of Moana, Noel Peat owned land in the township and across the mouth of the Arnold River, and since 1929 had petitioned the government to build a bridge at Moana connecting the two. No bridge was built, until in 1990 as part of New Zealand sesquicentennial celebrations Fletcher Challenge and the Department of Conservation collaborated on the construction of a 83-metre footbridge, which took 15 weeks to build, opening on 15 September 1990. It provided public access to the Tasman Forest Accord Scenic Reserve, 2050 ha of native forest protected from logging in 1989. The Lake Brunner Centennial Committee later developed a walking trial along the western shore of the Arnold River, now known as the Rakaitane Walk.
