= Pātea River =

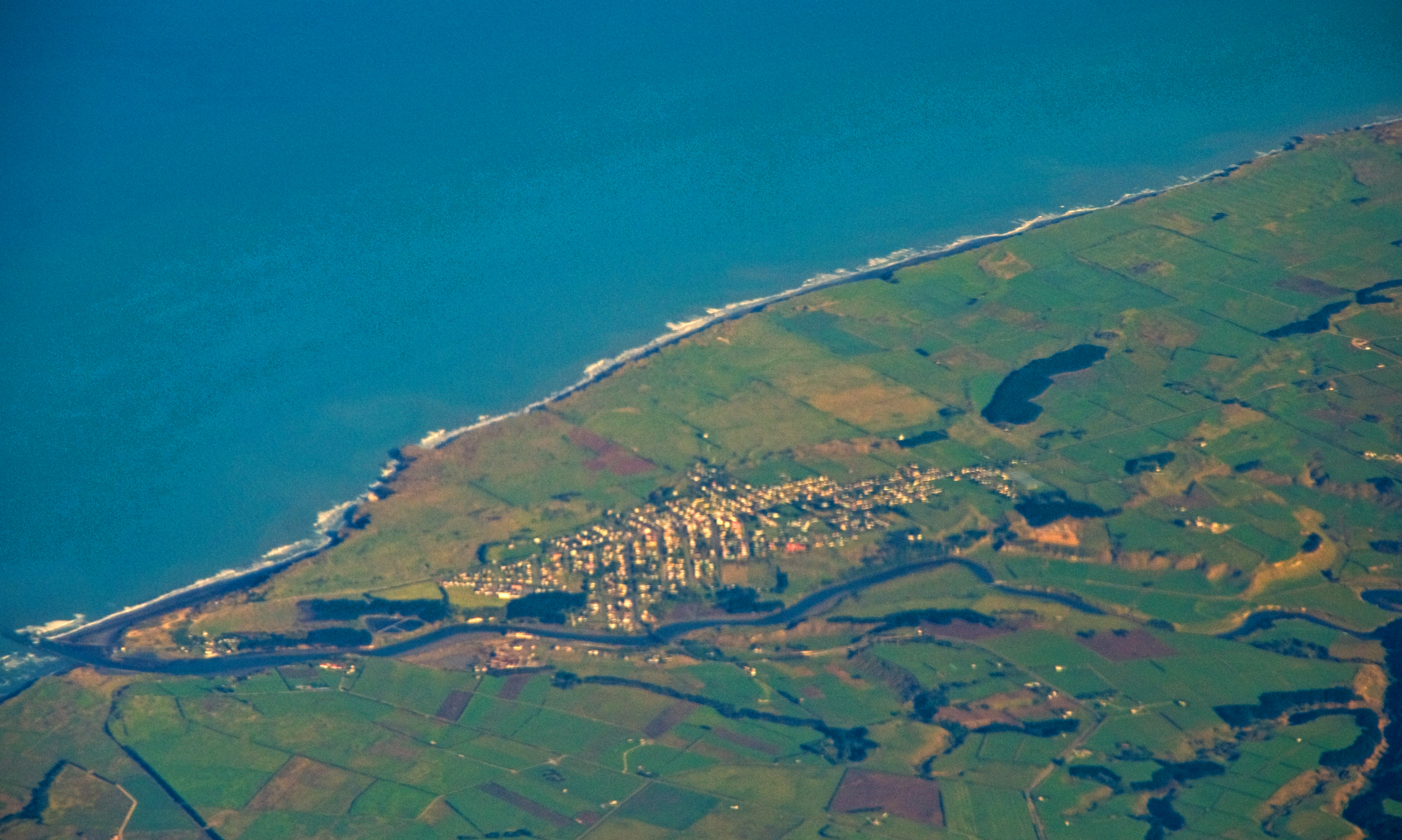
- The mouth of the Pātea River
- Route of the Pātea River
- Mouth of the Pātea River Pātea River (North Island)
- Native name: Pātea (Māori)

Location
- Country: New Zealand

Physical characteristics
- Source
  - location: Mount Taranaki
  - coordinates: 39°18′26″S 174°06′36″E
- Mouth
  - location: South Taranaki Bight
  - coordinates: 39°46′24″S 174°29′22″E
- Length: 174 kilometres (108 mi)

Basin features
- Progression: Pātea River → South Taranaki Bight → Tasman Sea
- Tributaries
  - left: Mangarangi Stream, Piakau Stream, Toko Stream, Makuri Stream, Mangaehu Stream, Mangakotuku Stream, Mangatoromiro Stream, Hauha Stream, Kuranui Stream, Urekawa Stream, Waireka Stream
  - right: Paetahi Stream, Ngaere Stream, Katatuna Stream, Maruarau Stream, Mangamingi Stream, Tutaeariari Stream, Otauira Stream, Okirau Stream, Upokorau Stream, Kakapirau Stream, Ohaha Stream, Ohio Stream
- Bridges: Pātea Bridge

The Pātea River is in Taranaki in the North Island of New Zealand. It runs for 174 kilometres from the eastern slopes of Mount Taranaki, passing east through Stratford before swinging south and reaching the South Taranaki Bight near the town of Pātea.

The river was the original portal to South Taranaki for both Māori and Europeans. In the early days of colonial New Zealand, the Pātea River defined the boundary between New Ulster Province and New Munster Province (from 1841 to 1853—refer to Provinces of New Zealand).

Many enjoy canoeing in the Pātea River—it is the only navigable river in South Taranaki.

Lake Rotorangi on the river is the longest man-made lake in New Zealand (46 km), formed when the Egmont Electric Power Board built the Pātea Dam in 1980–84. The interesting southern access drive is via Ball Road through Alton and Hurleyville. There is a camping site with toilet facilities at the dam.

In 2023 a 150-year-old waka, carved from a single tōtara trunk, was discovered in the Pātea River at the site of the Kuranui Pā, captured during Tītokowaru's War.
