= Hurleyville =

- Interactive map of Hurleyville
- Coordinates: 39°38′33″S 174°29′50″E
- Country: New Zealand
- Region: Taranaki
- District: South Taranaki District
- Ward: Pātea General Ward; Te Tai Tonga Māori Ward
- Community: Pātea Community
- Electorates: Whanganui; Te Tai Hauāuru (Māori)

Government
  - Territorial Authority: South Taranaki District Council
  - Regional council: Taranaki Regional Council
  - Mayor of South Taranaki: Phil Nixon
  - Whanganui MP: Carl Bates
  - Te Tai Hauāuru MP: Debbie Ngarewa-Packer

Area
  - Total: 221.65 km^{2} (85.58 sq mi)

Population (2023 census)
  - Total: 228
  - Density: 1.03/km^{2} (2.66/sq mi)

Hurleyville is a community in south Taranaki, in the western North Island of New Zealand. It is located 18 kilometres north of Pātea and 30 km southeast of Hāwera.

Pātea Dam is 20.6 km north.

== Demographics ==
Hurleyville locality covers 221.65 km^{2} (85.58 sq mi). The locality is part of the larger Mangawhio statistical area.

Historical population
Year	Pop.	±% p.a.
2006	237	—
2013	249	+0.71%
2018	237	−0.98%
2023	228	−0.77%

Hurleyville had a population of 228 in the 2023 New Zealand census, a decrease of 9 people (−3.8%) since the 2018 census, and a decrease of 21 people (−8.4%) since the 2013 census. There were 120 males and 108 females in 84 dwellings. 1.3% of people identified as LGBTIQ+. There were 57 people (25.0%) aged under 15 years, 36 (15.8%) aged 15 to 29, 108 (47.4%) aged 30 to 64, and 30 (13.2%) aged 65 or older.

People could identify as more than one ethnicity. The results were 93.4% European (Pākehā), 19.7% Māori, 2.6% Pasifika, and 5.3% other, which includes people giving their ethnicity as "New Zealander". English was spoken by 100.0%, Māori by 5.3%, Samoan by 1.3%, and other languages by 2.6%. No language could be spoken by 1.3% (e.g. too young to talk). The percentage of people born overseas was 6.6, compared with 28.8% nationally.

Religious affiliations were 31.6% Christian, and 1.3% New Age. People who answered that they had no religion were 59.2%, and 9.2% of people did not answer the census question.

Of those at least 15 years old, 30 (17.5%) people had a bachelor's or higher degree, 102 (59.6%) had a post-high school certificate or diploma, and 45 (26.3%) people exclusively held high school qualifications. 21 people (12.3%) earned over $100,000 compared to 12.1% nationally. The employment status of those at least 15 was 93 (54.4%) full-time, 30 (17.5%) part-time, and 6 (3.5%) unemployed.

== Education ==
Hurleyville School was a coeducational contributing primary (years 1–6) school. The school opened on 15 August 1892 and closed at the end of 2016.
