= Kaimai hydro power scheme =

Hydroelectric power stations in the Bay of Plenty, New Zealand

Coordinates: 37.777306°S 176.055332°E

The Kaimai hydro power scheme is a hydroelectric power scheme on the Wairoa River in the Bay of Plenty in New Zealand. The scheme is operated by TrustPower. It has four operational power stations, and formerly the McLaren Falls Station which was decommissioned in 1989 following the commissioning of the Ruahihi Station.

== Power stations ==
- McLaren Falls Station 750 kW - decommissioned
- Lloyd Mandeno Station 16 MW
- Ruahihi Station 20 MW
- Lower Mangapapa Station 5.6 MW
- Kaimai 5 Station 0.3 MW

== See also ==
- Hydroelectric power in New Zealand
