= Lake Rotorangi =

Lake in the North Island of New Zealand

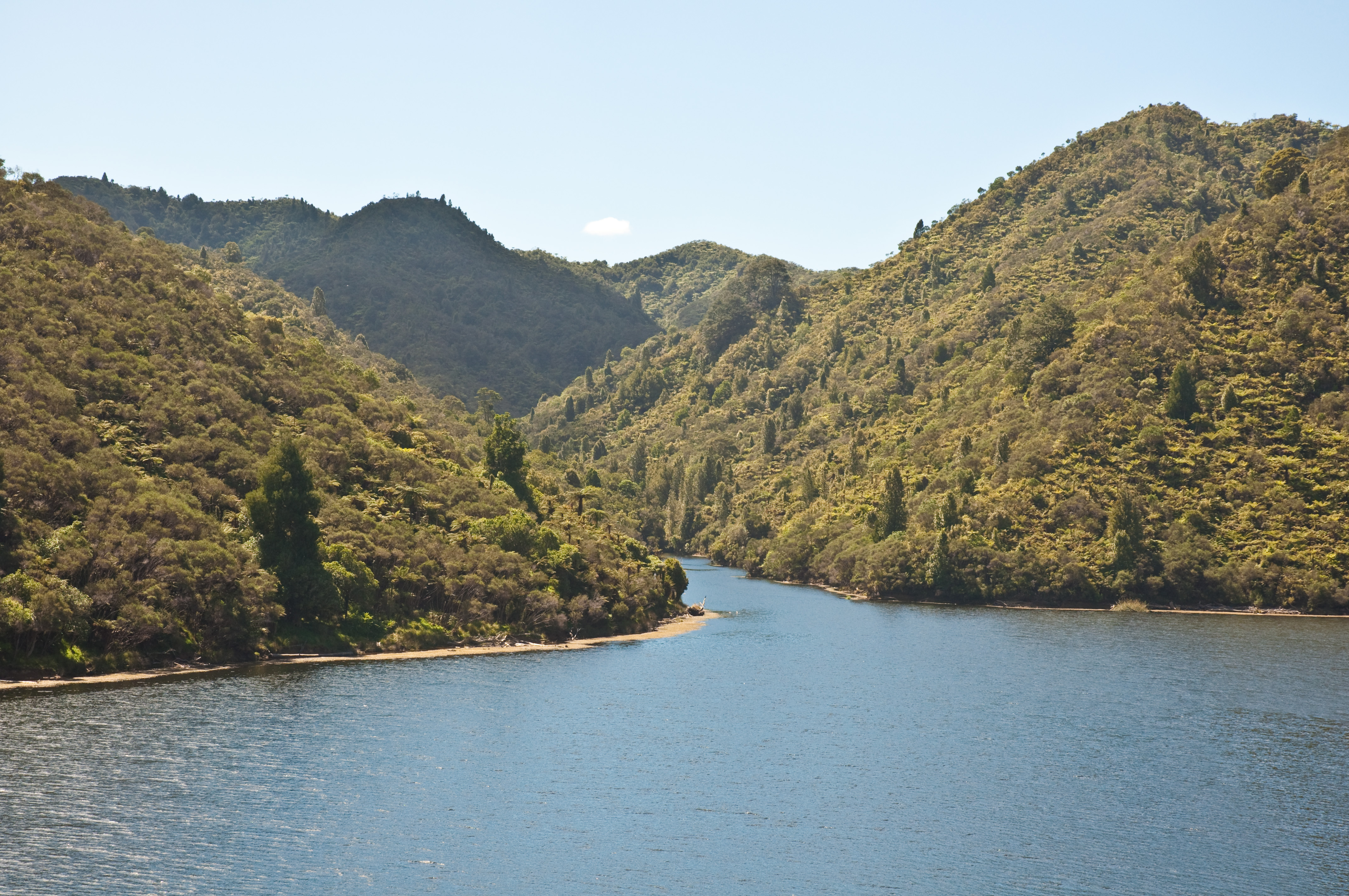
- Lake Rotorangi

- Location within New Zealand
- Interactive map of Lake Rotorangi
- Location: Taranaki, North Island
- Coordinates: 39.5018°S 174.5091°E
- Type: Reservoir
- Primary inflows: Pātea River
- Primary outflows: Pātea River
- Basin countries: New Zealand

Lake Rotorangi is the largest lake in the New Zealand region of Taranaki. The reservoir was created in 1984 by the damming of the Pātea River.

== History ==
Lake Rotorangi was formed in 1984 as a reservoir for hydroelectric power. The lake was formed by building an 82 metre high earth wall dam near the end of Ball Road in South Taranaki District. The dam created then filled the Pātea River valley for a distance of about 46 kilometres to make the longest reservoir of its type in New Zealand.

The Pātea Dam is owned by Manawa Energy (formerly Trust Power) and rated at 33 MW output (115 GWh per annum). Pātea is operated as a peaking station. With around one week's storage capacity, the station generates electricity over periods when electricity prices are highest. It is also a public camping ground, used in the summer time for various water sports.
