= Arnold Power Station =

Hydroelectric power plant in New Zealand

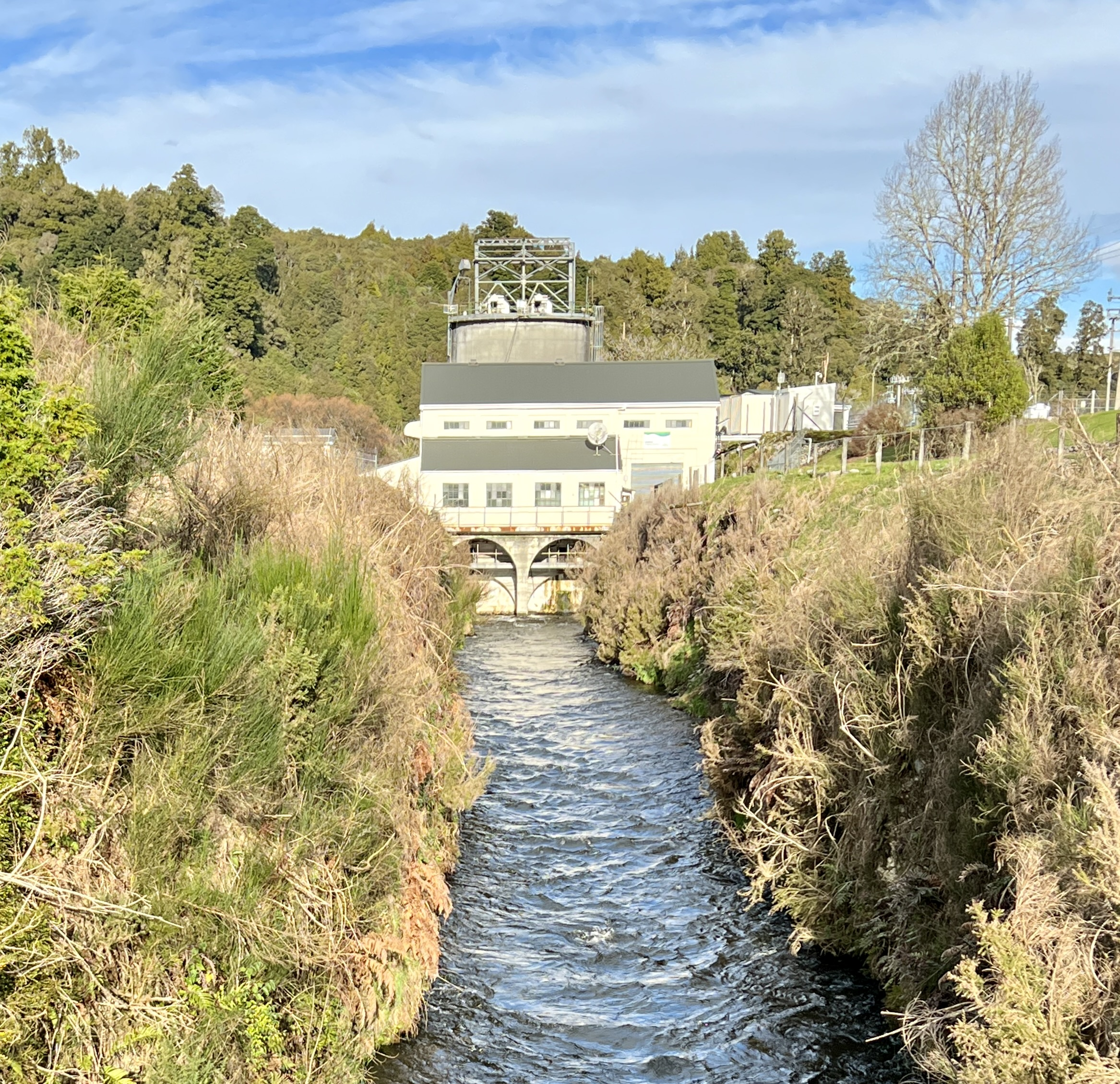
- Arnold Power Station from downstream
- Country: New Zealand
- Location: West Coast
- Coordinates: 42°31′44.58″S 171°24′40.56″E
- Status: Operational
- Commission date: 1932
- Owner: Manawa Energy
- Operator: Manawa Energy

Power generation
- Nameplate capacity: 3 MW (4,000 hp)

External links
- Commons: Related media on Commons

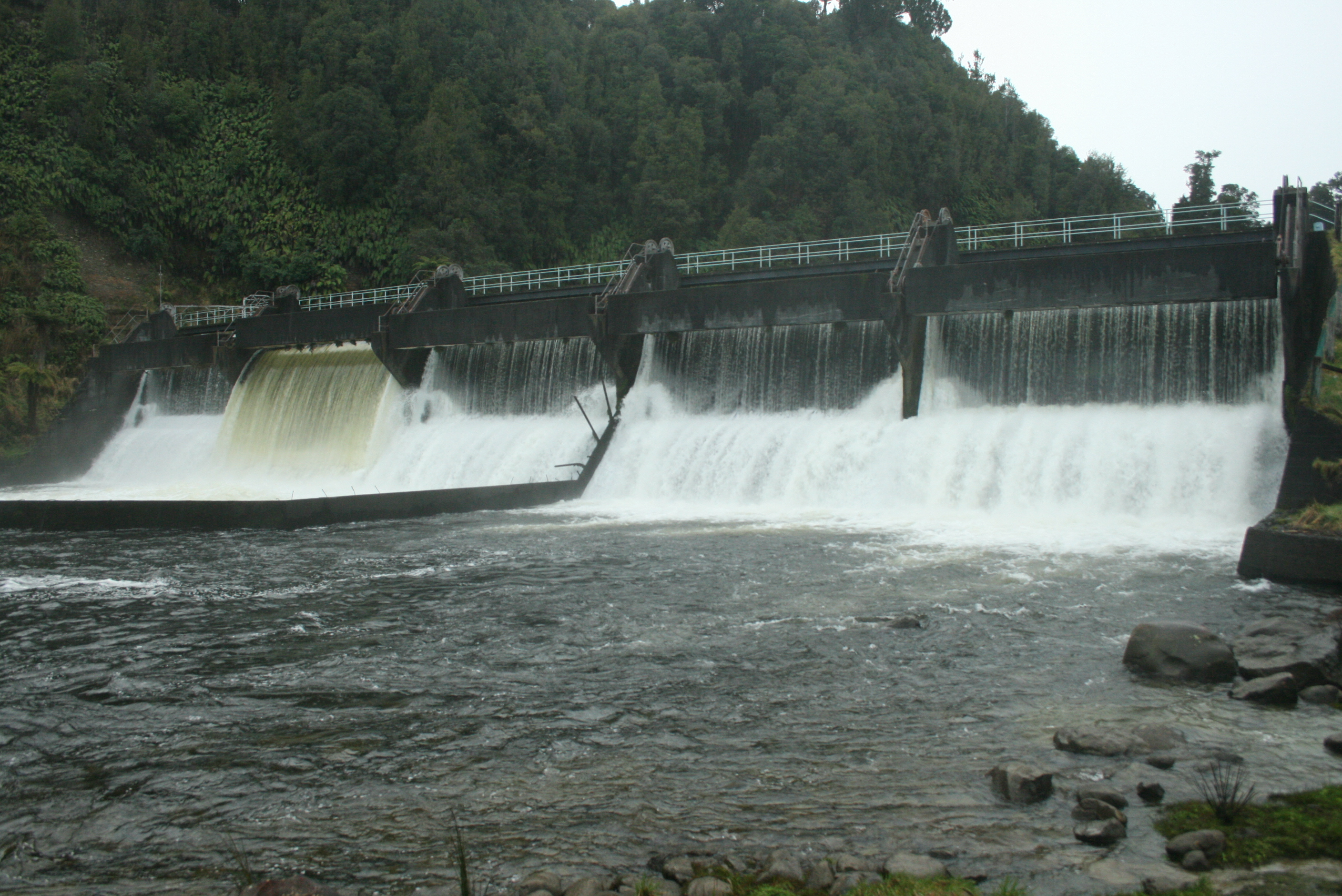
Weir dam at power station

The Arnold Power Station is a hydroelectric facility fed from Lake Brunner on the Arnold River in West Coast, New Zealand, owned and operated by Manawa Energy. Commissioned in 1932, the plant is rated at 3 megawatts (4,000 hp) and has an average annual output of 25 gigawatt-hours (90 TJ).

== History ==
Despite the pioneering achievements in supplying electricity to the town of Reefton in 1888, electricity was relatively late in coming to the settlements of the West Coast. The Grey Electric Power Board was established in October 1922, but at that stage, there was no immediate prospect of supply from the Government, and the Board was permitted to construct its own power scheme and associated transmission network. In 1923, a plan was developed to build a hydro-electric generating station on the Arnold River. However, to meet pressing demands for electricity supply from local residents this plan was postponed, and a coal-burning steam engine power station was built at Dobson in 1926. However, after only a year's operation, the level of demand was such that more capacity was required, and the planning for the Arnold River hydro scheme recommenced. Construction began in October 1929, and the power station was opened in September 1932. Electricity from the station was transmitted at 33 kV.

== Technical details ==
The station was built with a concrete gravity dam, with an earth wing wall. An intake tunnel 11 feet (3.4 m) in diameter and 1,650 feet (500 m) long was built connecting to a surge chamber and two short penstocks. As originally constructed, the station had a head of 36 feet (11 m), but this was later increased to 42 feet (13 m). The Arnold station had two variable-pitch Kaplan turbines each driving generators rated at 1,500 kW.

== Connecting to the National Grid ==
The settlements of the West Coast did not finally receive a supply of electricity from the National Grid until October 1938, when a 66 kV transmission line was completed from Lake Coleridge across the Southern Alps through Arthur's Pass to the West Coast. In anticipation of becoming connected to the National Grid, in 1937 the Grey Electric Power Board agreed to sell the Arnold River hydro-electric power station to the Government, and also to surrender its right to generate power.

== Further development ==
TrustPower had been planning a new hydroelectric power station at Arnold, with an output of 46 megawatts (62,000 hp) and average annual generation of 220 gigawatt-hours (790 TJ). Consents for this project were granted by the Grey District and West Coast Regional Councils in November 2008. Though the resource consents were upheld by the Environment Court in 2010, the project was put on hold indefinitely in 2012 due to changes in economic conditions.

In September 2019 Trustpower said that the scheme was unlikely to proceed as it was not economically viable. Consents for the scheme lapsed in December 2020.

== See also ==
- Electricity sector in New Zealand
- List of power stations in New Zealand
