= Omanawa Falls Power Station =

- Location within New Zealand
- Country: New Zealand
- Location: Bay of Plenty
- Coordinates: 37°50′46.6″S 176°05′21.3″E
- Purpose: Power
- Status: Operational
- Construction began: 1914
- Opening date: 1915
- Built by: Tauranga Borough Council
- Owners: Tauranga Borough Council; Tauranga Electricity; Manawa Energy; Tauranga City Council

Dam and spillways
- Type of dam: Weir
- Impounds: Omanawa River

Reservoir
- Total capacity: None

Omanawa Falls Power Station
- Operator: Omanawa Falls Hydro Limited
- Commission date: 1915
- Type: Run-of-the-river
- Hydraulic head: 109 ft (33.22 m).
- Turbines: 1
- Installed capacity: 0.3 MW (400 hp)
- Annual generation: 2.2 GWh (7.9 TJ)

The Omanawa Falls Power Station is a run of the river hydroelectric facility on the Omanawa River, in the Bay of Plenty in New Zealand. Built in 1915 to supply electricity to the town of Tauranga, it was the Southern Hemisphere's first underground power station.

== History ==
=== Development ===
The first power station in the Bay of Plenty were the Okere Falls Power Station on the Kaituna River which was commissioned in 1901.

The Water Power Act 1903, vested the rights to generate electricity in the Crown. The Public Works Act of 1908 consolidated the control of hydro-electric development by both central and local development, though the act was amended in that same year to allow private companies to generate electricity within strict conditions. The first decade of the 20th century witnessed the development of a number of hydroelectric schemes by various local authorities. Aware of the possibilities that electricity offered the B. C. Robbins, the Mayor of the Tauranga Borough Council engaged consulting engineers H.W. Climie & Son of Napier to investigate options for improving the town's infrastructure, including in addition to sanitary drainage and street improvement, the supply and distribution of electricity. The consultant's report which was delivered on 19 December 1912, identified that the rapids on the Waimapu and Wairoa Rivers, as well as the falls on Omanawa and Wairohi Rivers offered opportunities for the generation of electricity. H.W. Climie & Son proposed that for the Omanawa Falls:

In order to harness this Fall a tunnel should be driven some little distance above to a short distance below the Fall along one side of the gorge. The Power House would be built about twelve feet above the level of the pool in a cavity excavated in the side of the gorge. The water would be conveyed through the tunnel, thence through a vertical penstock direct to the turbines and discharged into a tail race built in the form of a tunnel below the power house.

By this arrangement the whole of the headworks as well as the power house would be protected from injury in the event of slips occurring in the vicinity of the Falls. The entrance to the tunnel would be protected from floating debris by an iron grillage, and leaves and sticks etc. would be prevented from getting into the turbines by an arrangement of screens which would be cleared daily if necessary. As most of the construction would be in concrete the work would be of a very permanent nature.

Two generating sets, each consisting of a high speed turbine direct coupled to an alternating generator, would be installed. Each set should be capable of developing about 120 hp. Until the demand exceeds the capacity of one set the other would be considered a standby, but when it becomes necessary to run both it would be advisable to install a third set. Each turbine would be controlled by means of a sensitive governor.

The report included an estimate of the cost of the Omanawa Falls power station reticulation scheme and concluded that it would make a profit. However, because the likely profit was quite small there was local opposition. In 1912 ratepayers voted by 250 to 98 in flavour of raising a £15,000 loan to pay for the scheme.

In 1913, the Tauranga Borough Council applied to the Department of Lands to have the Omanawa Falls vested in their body corporate for the purposes of water power generation. They also applied under section 268 of the Public Works Act 1908 for a licence to generate electricity.

In October 1914, the Public Works Department gave its approval for water to be taken from the Omanawa River to generate electricity and circulate it throughout the Borough and surrounding area.

H.W. Climie & Son won the tender to undertake the design of the power station and manage its construction. First a large arched cavern 50 ft (15 m) long 19 ft (5.8 m) wide and 19 ft (5.8 m) high in the centre of the parabolic arch was blasted out of the solid rock to the right hand side of the base of the falls. A 2 ft (0.61 m)thick concrete floor was laid in the bottom of the cavern to level the surface, cover the discharge cavity and on which to mount the machinery. A tunnel was then cut to carry water from the intake while an access tunnel was also cut to provide personnel access the powerhouse. The cavern was lined with 3 ft (910 mm) of concrete up to a height of 8 ft (2.4 m).

Two generators with a combined output of 200 kW were installed. The electrical equipment was installed by the Electrical Construction Company of Auckland. For the other parts of the works contracts were let for the supply of materials, and the erection was done by day labour. In 1915 the borough council hired Lloyd Mandeno as its electrical engineer, with responsibility not only for building the distribution system that will take power from the new power station but also to convince the population of 1,540 to give up their candles, kerosene lamps and town gas for the new untried electricity.

By 1924, 68 homes out of the 700 in the borough were using electric cooking.

=== Commissioning ===
On 28 August 1915 Henry Westcott Climie's son Henry ("Harry") Richmond Climie with the assistance of Mr. H.M. Millar, Assistant Electrical Engineer of the Public Works Department, commenced commissioning of the power station. On 2 October 1915 the Borough had electrical street lights for the first time, replacing the system of gas lamps. The output from Omanawa was carried to Tauranga on a three phase 11 kV line.

Tauranga incurred a debt of £17,250 to build the power station and associated reticulation, which came to £11 per head.

The original operator employed to run the power station was E.L. Gossett, When he was away on active service during World War I, W. Milne was employed in his place.

=== Expansion ===
After two years of operation demand for electricity had increased to such a level that the machines were found to be too small.

After the failure to find payable gold at the neighbouring Fleming's Reef to the south of Te Puke, landowner Malcolm Fleming sold the property to George Muir in 1918, who employed experienced prospector, Robert Worth to see if he could find any more gold. Worth discovered another gold bearing reef to the north of Flemings Reef. The mine which was named Muir's Reef operated from 1920 until 1928 when it closed.

To power the gold mining battery the owners of the land approached the Tauranga Borough Council about obtaining a supply of electricity. This new potential load when added to the increased load within the borough convinced the council to raise the output of the power station from 200 kW to 800 kW. It was proposed to supply the mine via a new high voltage over the Otawa range.

Lloyd Mandeno visited Australia to locate equipment that could be used in the expansion of the power station.

While the turbine had been originally designed for an 80 ft head it was locally modified after consulting with to and operated satisfactory on a 110 ft head. In 1921 a new General Electric 650 kW generator was purchased from the USA while a surplus Swiss-made Escher Wyss 1,200 hp turbine (made in 1908) was identified at a gold quartz crushing plant in the Karangahake Gorge after that site had failed in its own attempt at obtaining a power supply. The turbine was removed from its massive concrete foundations and split into two sections in preparation for moving to its new location.

As no truck was large enough to carry the turbine, the contracting firm of Brennans at Paeroa was contracted to carry the turbine sections on horse-drawn wagons the 100 km distance to Omanawa. the heaviest section took five days to cover the distance with a five-horse team supplemented by another five horses at steep sections along the route. To accommodate the new generator the existing units were removed and the powerhouse was enlarged, with W. Milne the foreman in charge of the modifications made on site to the electrical equipment. At the same time the head was increased to 33.5 metres.

This new generator produced on average 700 kW until 1974 when its outage put was reduced to 150 to 160 kW to allow the water to be diverted to other power stations in the Wairoa catchment.

In 1985 the cotton insulation on the windings failed damaging the coils. These were replaced.

As a result of the introduction of the Energy Companies Act in 1992 ownership of the power station was transferred by the council to a new created Tauranga Electricity Ltd, whose majority owner was the council owned Tauranga Civic Holdings Ltd. In June 1997 Tauranga Civic Holdings Ltd took total control of Tauranga Electricity. Following numerous merger and takeover offers Tauranga Electricity was sold by the Tauranga City Council to Manawa Energy on 31 October 1997 in return for a significant shareholding and guaranteed annual income of $3.3 million for the next five years.

=== Decommissioning ===
The station was decommissioned by Manawa Energy (formerly Trustpower) on 29 July 1998, who gifted it to the Tauranga City Council.

=== Refurbishment and recommissioning ===
Following the decommissioning of the station it suffered from vandalism, In 2007 Te Kuiti hydro electricity enthusiast Michael Davis decided to preserve the site due to its historical significance. After obtaining a 35-year lease from the Tauranga City Council. Davis invested NZ$300,000 to restore the power station.

While the generator was in poor condition for continued use it was saved and is now on display in the powerhouse. While it was necessary to install a modern new generator, the turbine was in good condition and was restored by Bay of Plenty engineer Jim Berryman. A new fully automated control system was also installed. The station began generating again in November 2008.

== Design ==
The power station is located adjacent to the 35-metre-high (115 ft) Omanawa Falls. Water is diverted from above the falls by a weir. The original proposal was to take the water from just above the falls, but it was afterwards considered advisable to take advantage of the additional 30 ft (9.14 m) of head which could be obtained by extending the tunnel some 5 ch (100.58 m) to 6 ch (120.70 m) further upstream to give a total head of 109 ft (33.22 m).

The water is drawn from the Omanawa River just above the rapids from a deep pool whose natural weir diverts the water into an intake structure protected from large debris by a steel grating rails. Behind this is a large cast iron headgate is operated through gearing from a concrete valve house located 15 ft (4.57 m) above normal water level. From the intake a 6 ft (1.83 m) high by 4 ft (1.22 m) wide tunnel runs for 9 ch (181.05 m) to a large 20 ft (6.1 m) high by 10 ft (3.0 m) wide reinforced concrete forebay. The forebay contains a revolving net strainer, 17 ft (5.2 m) long by 10 ft (3.0 m) wide, which prevents leaves and other debris brought down by the water from entering the turbines. From the forebay a 90 ft (27 m) long 42 in (1,100 mm)diameter vertical penstock brings the water down into the powerhouse where it was originally distributed via valves to the original two turbines. These valves control the supply of water to the individual turbines and are operated through gearing by means of hand wheels in the powerhouse. The penstock was originally sized for and arranged, so that a third generator (of twice the size if necessary) could be installed at a later date. Since 1921 there has only been one turbine. The powerhouse is carved into the ravine off to one side of the base of the falls. The open end was closed by a concrete wall with windows and a door big enough to allow all of the machinery to be lifted into the powerhouse.

The turbine discharges into a cavity under the floor, which occupies half the width and half the length of the powerhouse and which extents to a depth of 18 ft (5.5 m) below the floor level. During normal conditions there is 5 ft (1.5 m) of water in the bottom of the cavity, which exits via a 8 ft (2.4 m) high by8 ft (2.4 m)wide tunnel into the pool below the falls.

A 250 step access tunnel provided personnel access to the powerhouse. Access to the supply tunnel is obtained by means of several flights of steps, which branch off the main access tunnel.

The spring-fed river has a constant flow which allows the station to produce a constant power output, without any seasonal fluctuations. The water consent to take water from the river ensures that a minimum flow is maintained over the Omanawa Falls.

=== Original electrical equipment ===
Two generators with a nominal combined output of 200 kW were originally installed. Manufactured by Escher Wyss of Zurich, each horizontal Francis turbine had output of 150 hp (110 kW) at 750 rpm. Each turbine's speed was controlled by a dedicated oil pressure governor, which was also supplied by Escher Wyss. The turbine which had a bronze runner with a diameter of 15 in (380 mm), was coupled to a flywheel, from which a flexible coupling transmitted the power directly to an alternating current three-phase generator manufactured by the British Electrical Engineering Company of Loughborough. Each generator had a direct coupled exciter, which was capable of exciting the magnets of both generators at full load. The output of each generators were connected via cables to a 400 V to 11 kV step-up transformer manufactured by the British Electrical Engineering Company, before connecting to high tension oil insulated switchgear.

The principal items of electrical equipment were controlled and monitored via a 12 ft (3.7 m) long six panel 7.5 ft (2.3 m)switchboard, which partially extended across the front end of the power house. Each panel was faced with marble, 2 in (51 mm) thick. Two of the panels were allocated to the generators, with a spare panel reserved for a potential third generator, another panel contained a Tirrel automatic voltage regulator, while the last two panels were allocated to the step-up transformers. The switchboard and switchgear was manufactured by Johnson and Phillips, London. The transformers and the switchgear are located behind the switchboard in a 12 ft (3.7 m) square space enclosed with high wire woven screens to restrict personnel access. To reduce the risk of an explosion in the switchgear spreading to the rest of the powerhouse the switchgear were housed in concrete cubicles and operated remotely via a system of bell crank levers. From the switchgear the output of the station is carried via armoured cable to ground level before being conveyed over a stream above the falls in steel pipes about thirty feet above the water. It then passes up the eastern slope and terminates in a small galvanised iron hut in which were located lightning arresters (manufactured by the General Electric Company of U.S.A.) and from which the overhead three-phase 11 kV transmission line commences. The 13.5 mi (21.73 km) transmission line (which all also carried a telephone circuit) was supported on natural round ironbark poles, spaced on the average 100 yd (91 m) apart. The first 3 mi (4.83 km) traversed both the Kopuererua and Tau Tau gorges before the transmission entered Tauranga along the Waikareao Estuary and before being terminated at substation at the western end of Wharf Street where the voltage was stepped down to 400 V for distribution around the town.

=== Current status ===
The power station equipment was upgraded significantly in 2020 to recover lost turbine efficiency and restore the equipment condition suitable or long term continued operation. The upgrade works were carefully planned to maintain the look and feel of the original turbine and its historical significance which added significant complication to the project. This included locating a new direct drive generator back on the original foundation thus restoring the unit to its original configuration. Output has increased to 330 kW and 2.2-2.5 GWh of electricity a year. Generation is fed into Powerco's Kaimai 11 kV feeder to households on Omanawa Rd and further up the Kaimais.
