= Mangorei Power Station =

- Location within New Zealand
- Country: New Zealand
- Location: Taranaki
- Coordinates: 39°07′08.9″S 174°07′36.9″E for the dam
- Purpose: Power
- Status: Operational
- Construction began: 1904
- Opening date: 1906
- Owners: New Plymouth Borough Council (1906 - 1993); Taranaki Energy (1993 - 1995); Powerco (1995 - 1998); Manawa Energy (1998 -)
- Operator: Manawa Energy

Dam and spillways
- Type of dam: Concrete-core earth
- Impounds: Mangamahoe Stream
- Height (foundation): 27.4 metres
- Length: 160 m (520 ft)
- Spillways: 1

Reservoir
- Creates: Lake Mangamahoe

Mangorei Power Station
- Coordinates: 39°06′18.5″S 174°07′07.7″E
- Operator: Manawa Energy
- Commission date: 1906
- Type: Conventional
- Turbines: Four
- Installed capacity: 5 MW (6,700 hp)
- Annual generation: 20.9 GWh (75 TJ)

The Mangorei Power Station is a hydroelectric power facility near Mangorei in Taranaki in New Zealand which makes use of water from the Waiwhakaiho River (which is often written as Waiwakaiho) and the Mangamahoe Stream catchments.

== History ==
=== Initial development ===
Of the first 14 publicly available electricity supplies in New Zealand, seven were in the province of Taranaki. Most of these were hydroelectric schemes, utilising the seasonally consistent water supply provided by Mount Taranaki’s many streams. This development was driven by the demand for electric lighting by both town and rural dwellers plus farmers wishing to power their new electric shearing sheds, milking machines and separator.

In the late 19th century the New Plymouth Borough Council decided to investigate its options for constructing a hydro-electric power station to supply the town with electricity as well as providing a water supply. The nearby Waiwhakaiho River was identified as a suitable source of water. In 1898 a competition was held to design a scheme. The competition was judged by respected engineer Richard Liron Mestayer (1843 - 1921).

The council decided not to proceed with any of the schemes put forward and instead engaged Mestayer in 1901 to design his own scheme, which was subsequently accepted.

His design called for an intake on the Waiwhakaiho River from which water was conveyed 1,200 m (3,937 ft) to a powerhouse first by a tunnel that passed under the Mangamahoe Stream to a forebay on the hill, from which a 21 in (0.53 m) diameter steel penstock conveyed the water down to a manifold outside of the station from where the water was split to supply two turbines.

=== Construction begins ===
Mestayer's design was accepted, which lead to a construction contract being issued on 13 July 1903 to McWilliams and Andrews to build the scheme. The tunnel was dug from the outlet, from a side drive about 16 chains (322 metres) from the outlet, and from a 82 ft (25 m) deep shaft about 21 chains (422 metres) from the outlet. From the side drive and also from the shaft the tunnel was driven in both directions. The alignment of the tunnel was laid out on the surface by Sladden & Palmer, Civil Engineers and Surveyors, and then transferred to the bottom of the shaft by means of heavy plumb bobs suspended from the top by very fine wires, with the plumb bobs themselves hanging in buckets of water to dampen their movement. The line thus transferred was produced in both directions by means of a theodolite. The line was marked inside the tunnel by iron spikes driven into the roof, and from which the plumb bobs were suspended to guide the excavation. The levels were transferred from, the surface to the bottom of the shaft using a long steel tape, and then maintained as the work progressed by means of an engineer's level.

The power scheme received a licence from the government to generate electricity on 24 February 1905, and was completed in late 1905.

The first electricity was received in New Plymouth in January 1906, with 120 street lights and the town hall being lit. By the end of the year the power station which operated from dusk to midnight was supplying 41 customers. By 1907 demand had increased with the power station supplying 126 customers and 230 by 1912.

The power station originally had two turbines each driving a 45 kW single-phase generator. To meet increasing demand the station was enlarged under the supervision of borough engineer A.H. Kendall to accommodate an additional 150 hp turbine driving a 90 kW single-phase generator, which entered service in December 1907.

=== Expansion ===
With no storage capacity the 180 kW power station was strictly run of the river and was proving to be unreliable during periods of low summer flow. The growth of the town, and the impending introduction of electric powered trams necessitated the need for more generation, as well as providing more water for water reticulation purposes. As a result, the council in 1909 employed Henry Westcott Climie, the principal of consulting engineers H.W. Climie & Son to investigate possible options. Climie identified that the generation output was limited by the size of the tunnel, which couldn't be taken out of service and enlarged without cutting off the power supply to the town. He offered three options, (a) build a weir across the Waiwhakaiho below the present intake so as to give a greater head of water; (b) divert a portion of the water from the Waiwhakaiho, at a point about thirty chains above the present intake, by means of a tunnel and open race into the Mangamahoe Stream, and build a dam across the latter a little below where the present tunnel passes under it, or (c) take the water off the Waiwhakaiho at the same point as proposed in (b) and convey it by means of a larger new tunnel through the hill to the power station. Climie's recommended option was (a) which he calculated would give an effective 876 hp, equivalent to nearly 660 kilowatts of electrical energy at an estimated cost of £5,137 for the civil works plus the cost of the additional turbines and generators.

The council initially opted for option (a) but an inability to install a suitable foundation and a large flood caused this to be abandoned in favour of Climie's Option (c) which involved construction on the Waiwhakaiho River of a new intake 25 chains (502 m) further upstream, which diverted water by means of a 22 chain (442 m) long water race, 100 feet (30.48 metres) of which consists of a tunnel into the Mangamahoe Stream, where a 13 ft (4.0 m) high concrete gravity dam was constructed in 1914, just downstream of where the original tunnel had crossed it. Filling of the lake began in November 1914. From the dam the water was taken to a forebay, from where it entered the powerhouse, and the reticulation pipes of the town. This new diversion which cost approximately £4,000, captured not only water from the Waiwhakaiho but also all of the flow of the Mangamahoe Stream.

As a result of the increased flow the total output of the power station increased to 750 kW.

The new intake proved difficult to maintain as it frequently became blocked with large stones, gravel and branches which then had to be manually removed. As a result, improvements were made to its design which were completed on 16 January 1916.

At the same time as efforts were being made to increase the supply of water two 250 kW generators ordered from Turnbull and Jones entered service in 1912 and 1913. In 1914 the original two 45 kW generators were replaced by a new 250 kW generator.

In 1915 the council converted the transmission and distribution voltage on its system to 6.6 kV single-phase, which was upgraded in 1921 to three-phase.

=== Damage to and replacement of the dam ===
On 25 March 1917 the bed of the Mangamahoe Stream was seriously scoured out immediately from under the tunnel where it passed under the dam to a depth of 6 to 10 ft (2 to 3 m), which caused all of the water in the dam to be lost.

A temporary sack dam was erected behind the breach which allowed an approximately 3 ft 6 in (1.07 m) head to be obtained in the reservoir. However, it was difficult to regulate the flow of water while trying to avoid the risk of carrying away the dam at another place. Rather than repair the damage which would have meant closing down the tunnel and to restricting the town's demand (including closing down the tramways and turning off the street lighting) it was decided to build a new dam 50 ft (15.24 m) downstream of the existing dam. A design for a new concrete dam which would give a 3 ft (914.40 mm) higher head than the existing dam was submitted to the council on 23 May 1917 and approved.

The new dam was 109 ft (33.22 m)long at the top, 18 ft (5.49 m)high with a bottom thickness of 12 ft (3.7 m)and a top thickness of 2 ft (609.6 mm) widened by cornices to 2 ft 6 in (760 mm), to form a footway, which extends over the by-wash in two 13 ft 6 in (4.11 m) spans. This footbridge and the scour-valve platform were the only portions of the dam in which steel reinforcement was installed. The spillway was widened to 28 ft (8.5 m). No great difficulties were met during construction, except that it was necessary dig 4 to 6 ft (1.2 to 1.8 m) lower than originally intended in order to find a hard, and watertight bottom which was found to extend for 60 ft (18.3 m) in length from the north end to the centre of the stream. Beyond this to the south end of the wall the excavation was taken down to a depth of from 8 to 13 ft (2 to 4 m) lower than originally intended. A 30 in (762 mm) cast-iron gate valve was installed to allow emptying and letting sand out of the lake.

By February 1918 the dam had finished and refilled with water.

=== Mason's proposal ===
With the demand for electricity within the Borough of New Plymouth showing no sign of levelling off, and with applications for power been received from other local bodies, the council committed to expanding the Mangorei scheme.

The council in late 1918 engaged consulting engineer John Blair Mason (1858 - 1927) of Blair Mason, Lee, Owen and Cree Brown, to investigate the various options. Mason offered a number of options but Scheme D which also had a partial option called E11 became the preferred choice of the council. Scheme D called for tapping the Waiwhakaiho River at a new upstream intake and conveying the water via a tunnel to a lake created by a new 110 ft (34 m) high dam on the Mangamahoe Stream about 30 chains (603 m) above the existing dam. This high dam would give a head of 231 ft (70 m) above the powerhouse, submerge at least 30 acres (12 hectares) and with a 10 ft (3 m) draw off would provide 13,000,000 cubic feet (370,000 m^{3}) of storage. The lake would rise 2 ft (610 mm)above the saddle about one-half mile (800 m) south of a forebay from whence it would be conveyed by water races and penstocks to the powerhouse. The actual storage required with a load factor of 0.45 to develop the maximum water power would amount to 7¼ million cubic ft (205,000 cubic metres). Mason estimated that this would give a maximum of 6,300 hp. His estimated cost for the project was £46,000. Scheme E11 on the other hand he estimated would cost £11,700, of which only £1,300 need be regarded as temporary work, being the estimated cost of race and depreciation on pipe line. It involved constructing the weir, intake and tunnel portions of the permanent works of scheme D, which could reused if the council choose at a later date to proceed with the full scheme. From the outfall of the tunnel the water would be conveyed via a 140 chain (2,800 m) long water race to a penstock above the present forebay. From here up to 100 cusecs (2.8 cumecs) would be delivered to the powerhouse through new penstocks.

Over the next two years the plans were modified, with scheme D being renamed Scheme 1, with a dam now giving a 237 ft (72.24 m) head, which would submerge 95 acres (38 hectares) and have a capacity of 50 million ft^{3} (1.4 million m^{3}) with a 15 ft (5 m) draw off. This would require the building of two 1,400 ft (426.7 m) long embankments on the South side of the proposed reservoir to prevent the water overflowing the adjacent lands. There would also be three penstocks running from the forebay/surge chamber to the powerhouse. This scheme was expected to develop 9,000 hp.

The partial scheme now known as E2 was basically as per Mason's but had an increased head and flow of 150 cusec which it was expected would produce an additional 2,000 hp on top of the power station's existing 900 hp.

The council made the decision in 1919 to proceed with the partial scheme. However, its estimated cost had to the council's enormous disappointment increased by January 1920 to £112,000 and which they expected to make an annual profit of £13,800 on the electricity being generated. The loans to service this expenditure were approved by ratepayers. In October 1920, the estimate was further increased to £172,000 (which included contingencies of £12,000) with an expected annual profit on the electricity being generated dropping to £6,042. As a result, the council in November 1920 with approximately £60,000 already spent to date reluctantly had to go back to ratepayers to obtain approval to raise another £60,000 loan.

=== The partial scheme ===
The partial scheme as completed in early 1923 had a diversion weir and intake about a mile and a half above the previous intake. The new concrete diversion intake on the Waiwhakaiho River had a base 15 ft below the river level and rose to about 12 ft above the normal height of the river. it was divided into four valve chambers, with three ports open to the river on one face, and one on the other face of the intake. These could be opened or closed by gates as required.

From the intake the water was conveyed through the 1,800 ft (550 m) long Tunnel No. 1. A few feet of this tunnel was driven from the intake end, but the principal excavation work was being done from the opposite end of the tunnel. The haulage of the spoil from the driving was undertaken by pony-drawn trucks. The tunnel was light by electricity with airshafts at regular intervals. The excavation of the tunnel which was estimated to cost approximately £12,000 was undertaken by Payne and Blanchard Ltd using a workforce that varied between 13 and 25 men working in three shifts.

At the exit of Tunnel No.1 a small 37 ft (11.3 m) high dam (which was termed a "Turning Wall") with a concrete core was built to deflect the water into Water Race No. 1. This 1,115 ft (340 m) long race terminated at a 558 ft (170 m) long pipeline which took the water over the Mangamahoe Stream 36 ft (11 m) below to the 1,968 ft (600 m) long Water Race No. 2. This race then transitioned to 4,000 ft (1,200 m) long Tunnel No.2 which took it to a forebay/surge chamber 140 ft (43 m) higher up the hill than the existing surge chamber. From here a steel penstock conveyed the water down to the powerhouse.

This improved supply of water and increased head of 240 ft (73.2 m) allowed the council to install two new 1,000 kVA generators, convert one of the existing 250 kW machines, to produce 750 kVA, and replace another 250 kW unit with a new 1,000 kVA unit.

Defects were found in Tunnel No.2 which led the council in 1923 to dismiss their consulting engineers Blair Mason, Lee, Owen and Cree Brown, who had been responsible for overseeing all civil works. The council's electrical department was responsible for the electrical work.

On 27 April 1928 approximately 100 ft (30.5 m) of the southern end of the pipeline that carried water across the Mangamahoe Stream was destroyed by a landslide, which cut off the water supply to the power station for approximately two weeks until it was repaired. Until it was the supply the street light lighting and trams were switched off and New Plymouth's demand was restricted to what could be supplied via a tie line from the Taranaki Electric Power Board.

=== Creation of Lake Mangamahoe ===
As the demand for electricity continued to rise and aware of the benefits of having a larger reservoir that would provide both generation storage capacity as well as delivering a reliable water supply to New Plymouth, the council committed to undertaking the full scheme by building a dam on the Mangamahoe Stream. The contract to build the dam was won by J. T. Julian and Son in March 1929 with a price of £35,310 7s 6d. Construction started in 1929 with the diversion of the stream through a tunnel on the left abutment. The foundations for the dam were then excavated and a trench dug for the concrete core.

Mechanical earth moving was just starting to be employed in New Zealand, and as a result tractors and scrapers were used to construct the dam.

The dam was completed in 1931 and submerged approximately 79 acres (32 hectares) of land to form Lake Mangamahoe.

At the time of its completion the dam was the highest earth dam in Australasia. The existing two water races and the pipeline over the Mangamahoe Stream were left in place and flooded by the lake. The New Plymouth Borough was connected to the Arapuni Power Station in 1934 which meant that the borough had a sufficient electricity supply.

By March 1948 the various modifications to the power station had resulted in it having an output of 3,750 kW, which was provided by one 90 kW, one 240 kW, one 750 kVA and three 1,000 kW generators.

On 1 September 1983 the power station was added to the New Zealand Historic Places list as a Historic Place Category 2.

=== Changes in ownership ===
As a result of the restructuring of the New Zealand electricity sector in the early 1990s, the electricity department of the New Plymouth City Council (trading as New Plymouth Energy) merged with the Taranaki Electric Power Board on 7 May 1993 to form Taranaki Energy Ltd.

In 1995 Taranaki Energy Ltd merged with and took the name of Powerco.

The introduction of the Electricity Industry Reform Act in 1998 required New Zealand's electricity companies to separate their network and retail businesses. As a result, Powerco having elected to remain a network company sold its five power stations (which including Mangorei) to Manawa Energy (formerly Trustpower).

=== Improvements ===
In recent years Manawa has undertaken extensive work on the linings of the supply tunnel to reduce friction.

== Design ==
A weir on the Waiwhakaiho River diverts water into the 1,800 ft (549 m), 7 ft 3 in (2.21 m) diameter concrete lined Tunnel No.1 which conveys it to the top of Lake Mangamahoe.

This manmade lake was created by a dam at its northern end which impounds the Mangamahoe Stream above its confluence with the Waiwhakaiho River. The 27.4-metre-high earth dam, which is 160 m long at the crest, has a substantial curved concrete core running throughout its centre and set into the hard sandstone on each bank and is at least 6 m thick. The lake side has a 3-to-1 slope, with the surface exposed to the water surface lined with stone, while the downstream side has a 2-to-1 slope.

To the west of it is an intake structure with four remotely controlled intake gates. From the intake structure the 4,000-foot-long (1,219 m), 7-foot-3-inch-diameter (2.2 m) Tunnel No.2 conveys the water from the lake to a 37-foot-diameter (11.2 m) forebay/surge chamber. From the forebay/surge chamber two steel penstocks carry the water down to the powerhouse which is located on Hydro Rd (S.H.3), Mangorei. The powerhouse has three 1.3 MW generators and one 700 kW generator. The generators discharge into a tailrace which flows into the Waiwhakaiho River, approximately six kilometres down stream of the intake.

Water is also taken via two intakes on the lake's western shore to a nearby water treatment plant, from where it is distributed to consumers in the New Plymouth area.

== Operation ==
Resource consents which were granted in 1996 and which expire in June 2021 allow the power station to divert up to 10 cumecs of water from the Waiwhakaiho River and back into it. The power station is required to maintain a minimum flow in the river below the diversion weir.

Lake Mangamahoe also serves as the water supply for New Plymouth and is a Wildlife Refuge. A trap and transfer programme manages any disruption to the migration of longfin eel.

The power station is embedded in Powerco's network behind Transpower's Carrington Street Substation.

The power station is operated remotely via a SCADA system from Manawa Energy's control centre in Tauranga.

== See also ==
- Hydroelectric power in New Zealand
