= Motukawa Power Station =

- Location within New Zealand
- Country: New Zealand
- Location: Taranaki
- Coordinates: 39°12′31.9″S 174°20′0.3″E for the dam on the Mako Stream
- Purpose: Power
- Status: Operational
- Construction began: 1923
- Opening date: 1927
- Owners: Taranaki Electric Power Board (1927 - 1993); Taranaki Energy (1993 - 1995); Powerco (1995 - 1998); Manawa Energy (1998 - )
- Operator: Manawa Energy

Dam and spillways
- Type of dam: Earth
- Impounds: Mako Stream
- Height (foundation): 15 m

Reservoir
- Creates: Lake Ratapiko
- Surface area: 21 hectare
- Maximum length: 3 km

Motukawa Power Station
- Coordinates: 39°11′2.3″S 174°22′54.0″E
- Operator: Manawa Energy
- Commission date: 1927
- Type: Conventional
- Hydraulic head: 99 m
- Turbines: Four
- Installed capacity: 5 MW (6,700 hp)
- Annual generation: 22 GWh (79 TJ)
- Website; Trustpower

The Motukawa Power Station is a hydroelectric power facility in Taranaki in New Zealand which makes use of water from the Manganui River. Water is drawn from behind a weir on the Manganui River near Tariki and diverts this water through a race to Lake Ratapiko and then through penstocks to the Motukawa Power Station. The power station discharges into the Mākara Stream, a tributary of the Waitara River.

== History ==
=== Development ===
Of the first 14 publicly available electricity supplies in New Zealand, seven were in the province of Taranaki. Most of these were hydroelectric schemes, utilising the seasonally consistent water supply provided by Mount Taranaki’s many streams. These development was driven by the demand for electric lighting by both town and rural dwellers plus farmers wishing to power their new electric shearing sheds, milking machines and separator.

Stratford (1898), Patea (1902), Hāwera (1903), Inglewood (1904), Waitara (1905) and New Plymouth (1906) had been early adopters of electricity but Eltham lagged behind.

In May 1919 a meeting was held in Eltham to discuss the feasibility of obtaining a supply of electric power for Eltham Borough and the surrounding districts. This meeting eventually led to the establishment of the Taranaki Electric Power Board which held its first meeting on 7 August 1922. At first the new power board sought to obtain its power from New Plymouth but after it was found that this would not immediately be available they held a competition to design a power station in their area. The winner was Henry ("Harry") Richmond Climie of consulting engineers H.W. Climie and Son. In April 1923 the Taranaki Electric Power Board agreed to go ahead with this scheme which would take advantage of most of the natural 122-metre fall in elevation on the Manganui River near Tariki and the Waitara River near Motukawa.

Once construction started on what became the Motukawa scheme the Stratford Borough Council asked to be connected to the supply once the station was generating.

=== Construction ===
Construction commenced in 1923.

The first step was the building and commissioning of a weir in 1924 on the Manganui River near Tariki from which water was taken to power a small generator to provide power for the construction of the main scheme with surplus electricity being made available to a few local farmers.

To provide temporary power during construction a 200 kVA hydro generator was installed in 1924 at the headworks near Tariki. The generator had sufficient spare capacity that a few nearby farmers were able to receive an electrical supply. The remains of this unit still exist today.

The scheme required the water be conveyed across swampland at Ratapiko. It was intended that this would be by canal with part via a two-metre-high (6.6-foot) tunnel, which meant going through mud, peat and buried logs. The decaying peat made it necessary before commencing work each day for a build-up of marsh gas. After repeated partial collapses and then a complete collapse of the tunnel it was decided to opt for a canal instead of a tunnel for the remainder of the route. While the rest of the twenty men employed to build the tunnel was moved to other work or dismissed, two men were kept on to construct the canal out of the collapsed tunnel by using a powerful pump to sluice out the swampy soil and explosives to remove the timber that had been used to store up the tunnel and buried tree stumps.

To bore the tunnel from the lake to the site of the surge chamber in the Waitara valley, a tunnelling machine was purchased from Sir William Arrol and Co. of Glasgow. This was shipped on the SS Waimana in 12 cases and arrived in New Zealand in January 1924. This is believed to have been the earliest use of a tunnelling machine in New Zealand.

In April 1924, the cases were transported from Inglewood to the site with assembly commencing in May 1924. Delays then occurred through June and July with trying to adjust and operate it due to what was identified as poor workmanship by the manufacturer. Wrong cutters had also been sent and replacements requested, which upon arrival were found to be of such poor quality that new ones had to be manufactured in New Zealand.

These delays meant that it wasn't until 15 September 1924 that a start was made on driving the tunnel from the surge chamber already excavated at the downstream end. The initial average speed of cutting through the papa rock (a Māori-derived term for blue-grey mudstone), was one metre per hour with a maximum advance of 1.5 metres per hour, including all stops. Unfortunately, large boulders were soon encountered, sometimes every 1.5 metres, which all had to be excavated by hand. The largest boulder was 7.6 m long.

In November 1925, after 2,080 metres of the tunnel had been excavated the ground conditions changed to an overlaying silt-like material with the overlying country being swamp. Before it could be shored up with timber, the tunnel caved in over the machine, filling the tunnel for 80 metres, with fortunately no loss of life. It was then necessary to excavate the whole crater which formed in the swamp 18 metres above the collapsed tunnel. A shaft was sunk and then shored up with timber so that the tunnelling machine could be brought out through it.

Further work on the tunnel was carried out by hand using heavy timbering until by May 1926, the faulty section of the tunnel had been concrete lined. The section of the tunnel that passed rock was shotcrete lined. The tunnel was finally completed on 23 August 1926.

A shaft was constructed at the upstream end of the tunnel to allow the tunnelling machine to be removed, a task which was accomplished by May 1926. With no further need for the tunnelling machine the Power Board offered it for sale. While some auxiliary equipment was sold (such as the cement gun and air compressor) the machine itself ended up being utilised as a source of parts for other activities undertaken by the Power Board.

The cost of the scheme more than doubled compared with the original estimate, which required the power board to introduce an availability rate for four years. This was applied to customers living within 201 metres (10 chains) of a supply line to offset some of the costs.

=== Commissioning ===
The first generator at Motukawa Power Station came into operation on 9 January 1927, with the last of the three units commissioned in 1938.

Stratford received its first supply from Motukawa by 1930, with Inglewood taking supply by 1933 and Waitara by 1934.

=== 1970 upgrade ===
To increase the station output the original 1,219-metre-long (3,999 ft), 1.22-metre-diameter (4.0 ft) steel, riveted penstock was replaced in 1970 by 1.6-metre-diameter (5.2 ft) spiral-welded penstock. The original designers had made provision for the installation of an additional penstock which allowed the changeover of the penstocks to be effected with minimum interruption to supply.

=== Changes in ownership ===
As a result of the restructuring of the New Zealand electricity sector in the early 1990s the Taranaki Electric Power Board merged with the electricity department of the New Plymouth City Council (trading as New Plymouth Energy) on 7 May 1993 to form Taranaki Energy Ltd.

In 1995 Taranaki Energy Ltd merged with Powerco.

The introduction of the Electricity Industry Reform Act in 1998 required New Zealand's electricity companies to separate their network and retail businesses. As a result, Powerco having elected to remain a network company sold its five power stations (which including Motukawa) to Manawa Energy.

=== Improvements ===
In 2005 Manawa Energy installed a weir and a 200 kW in-race generator in the canal, adjacent to the Mangaotea Road to take advantage of the natural fall in the canal system. In 2007 pumps were installed to lift water about four metres up out of the Mangaotea Stream to contribute extra flow into the canal and hence through the generators. These improvements added to the scheme's power output.

== Design ==
The Motukawa scheme makes use of 99 metres of an available 122-metre difference in elevation between the Manganui River near Tariki and the Waitara River near Motukawa to drive three generators located in the powerhouse, plus an in-race generator in the canal which runs between the headworks and Lake Ratapiko.

=== Headworks ===
Water is diverted from the upper reaches of the Manganui River by a weir with a fish pass located about four kilometres from the junction of State Highway 3 and Tariki Road.

Up to 5,200 litres per sec of water is allowed to be taken, with the amount of water being diverted from the weir managed by two motorised control gates down a short canal into a settling pond. From this pond the water goes along a five kilometre canal which includes two tunnels and an aqueduct across the Mangaotea Stream before entering Lake Ratapiko.

A resource consent requires that a residual flow of no less than 400 L/s is maintained in the Manganui River below the weir at all times in order to provide for the passage of fish and maintain a reasonable water quality in the Manganui River downstream of the weir. This residual flow is to be passed through a fish pass.

=== Lake Ratapiko ===
The canal discharges into the shallow manmade Lake Ratapiko which was created by constructing a 15-metre-high (49 ft) earth dam across the Mako Stream, which is a tributary of the Makino Stream. The 21-hectare lake is approximately three kilometres long and has an average depth of 2.5 metres with many shallow sections. The lake level is only allowed to vary by one metre when generating electricity. As well as providing storage for the Motukawa Power Station the lake is available for recreation and is used for power boat racing and water skiing.

=== Tunnel ===
From the lake, the water runs via a forebay structure into a 2.875-kilometre-long (1.786 mi), 2.13-metre-diameter (7.0 ft) tunnel which conveys it to a 9.1-metre-diameter (30 ft), 19.8-metre-high (65 ft) surge chamber, located in the hill above the power station. A 1.6-metre-diameter (5.2 ft) welded-steel penstock takes the water from the surge chamber to the powerhouse. The powerhouse is accessed from Motukawa Rd, Ratapiko, Inglewood.

The generators in the power station discharge into the Mākara Stream, a tributary of the Waitara River.

== Operation ==
Operation of the power station is covered by a total of 23 resource consents, which include a total of 186 conditions. These were obtained in 2001 and will expire in June 2022.

Eel and fish are not able to pass through the scheme. However, there's a successful trap and transfer programme for longfin eel, supporting the species’ migration.

The power station is embedded in Powerco's network behind Transpower's Huirangi Substation.

The power station is operated remotely via a SCADA system from Manawa Energy's control centre in Tauranga.

== See also ==
- Hydroelectric power in New Zealand
