= Powerco =

New Zealand electricity and gas distribution company

Powerco Limited
- Industry: Energy
- Predecessor: Taranaki Energy Limited
- Founded: 1999
- Headquarters: New Plymouth, New Zealand
- Services: Electricity distribution Natural gas distribution
- Number of employees: 520 full-time equivalent
- Website: www.powerco.co.nz

Powerco is a New Zealand electricity and gas distribution company. It operates networks in the North Island and is one of two companies in the country (the other being Vector) that distribute both electricity and natural gas. As of 2024, Powerco’s electricity network spans approximately 29,200 km (18,100 mi), while its gas network includes about 6,300 km (3,900 mi) pipelines. The company serves around 360,000 electricity and 113,000 gas counsumers.

Powerco is jointly owned by Queensland Investment Corporation and AMP Capital, both based in Australia.

== History ==
- April 1993 - New Plymouth Energy (the electricity division of the New Plymouth District Council) merges with Taranaki Electricity (former Taranaki Electric Power Board) to become Taranaki Energy Limited.
- 1994 - Taranaki Energy acquired the Hawera Gas Company.
- October 1995 - Taranaki Energy Limited merges with Wanganui-based Powerco (the former Wanganui Electric Power Board) to become Powerco Limited.
- September 1997 - Powerco acquires Hawera based Egmont Electricity.
- April 1998 - Government pass Electricity Industry Reform Act. PowerCo decided to become a "network business" (or lines company), and the following changes are made:
  - Electricity Retail Business (customer base) sold to Genesis Power
  - Gas Retail Business sold to Natural Gas Corporation
  - Natural Gas Corporation's Taranaki gas networks sold to Powerco
  - Powerco's five hydro power stations sold to TrustPower
  - Powerco purchases Wairarapa Electricity's network business (formerly part of the Wairarapa Electric Power Board)
- August 2000 - Powerco merged with CentralPower (itself formed by the merger of CentralPower (for former Manawatu-Oroua Power Board) and ElectroPower, the former electricity division of Palmerston North City Council).
- June 2001 - Powerco purchases the Hutt Valley and Porirua gas networks from AGL.
- February 2002 - Powerco purchases the electricity assets of United Networks Limited in Tauranga, Eastern and Southern Waikato, Thames and Coromandel, plus gas networks in Wellington, Horowhenua, Manawatū and Hawke's Bay.
- 2004 - Powerco purchased Siemens Energy Services' Tauranga based contracting division
- November 2005 - Powerco sold its New Zealand field services contracting business to Tenix Alliance
- 2008 - Divestment of Powerco Australia Group (Tasmania gas distribution) to Babcock & Brown Infrastructure.
- October 2025 - Powerco confirmed intentions to buy Firstlight Network, the electricity distribution business serving the Gisborne and Wairoa districts, from Clarus. The purchase is subject to regulatory approval.

== Electricity network ==
Powerco's electricity distribution network serves the eastern Waikato, western Bay of Plenty, Taranaki, most of Manawatū-Whanganui, and Wairarapa.

Powerco Limited network statistics for the year ending 31 March 2024
Parameter	Value
Regulatory asset base	$2,797 million
Line charge revenue	$427.4 million
Capital expenditure	$281.9 million
Operating expenditure	$123.0 million
Customer connections	359,857
Energy delivered	5,003 GWh
Peak demand	967 MW
Total line length	29,202 km
Distribution and low-voltage overhead lines	20,145 km
Distribution and low-voltage underground cables	7,227 km
Subtransmission lines and cables	1,829 km
Poles	264,577
Distribution transformers	37,664
Zone substation transformers	212
Average interruption duration (SAIDI)	251 minutes
Average interruption frequency (SAIFI)	2.00

== Gas network ==
Powerco's gas distribution network serves Hawke’s Bay, Taranaki, Manawatū, and the Wellington metropolitan area.

Powerco Limited gas network statistics for the year ending 30 September 2024
Parameter	Value
Regulatory asset base	$455 million
Line charge revenue	$65.0 million
Capital expenditure	$18.1 million
Operating expenditure	$19.7 million
Customer connections	113,385
Total gas conveyed	8,183 TJ
Maximum daily load	36.6 TJ
System length	6,291 km
