= Aniwhenua Power Station =

- Location within New Zealand
- Country: New Zealand
- Location: Bay of Plenty
- Coordinates: 38°18′30.3″S 176°47′27.7″E (For the dam)
- Purpose: Power
- Status: Operational
- Construction began: 1977
- Opening date: 1980
- Construction cost: NZ$27,767,203
- Owner: Southern Generation Partnership
- Operator: Pioneer Energy

Dam and spillways
- Impounds: Rangitaiki River

Reservoir
- Creates: Lake Aniwhenua
- Surface area: 255 ha
- Maximum length: 4.5 km
- Maximum width: Approximately 500 m
- Maximum water depth: 10 m

Power Station
- Coordinates: 38°17′37.3″S 176°47′32.5″E
- Operator: Pioneer Energy
- Commission date: 1980
- Type: Run of the river
- Hydraulic head: 38 metres
- Turbines: Two
- Installed capacity: 25 MW (34,000 hp)
- Annual generation: 127 GWh (460 TJ)
- Website; Aniwhenua Hydro Station

The Aniwhenua power station is a hydroelectric power facility in Bay of Plenty in New Zealand located on the Rangitaiki River upstream of the Matahina Power Station. Water is drawn from behind a dam above the Aniwhenua Falls and diverted through a canal and a headpond to the power station before being discharged back into the river. The power station is named after the falls which are adjacent to the power station.

== History ==
=== Development ===
In the late 19th century and early 20th century, numerous small local power generation stations were built by both private and local authorities. From the 1920s onward as the state electricity system expanded and the national grid was developed, development of small local power stations declined as the centralisation of electricity supply under state control increased.

The 1973–74 oil shock, nation-wide electricity shortages during the winters of 1973 and 1974, a renewed policy emphasis on regional development by central government, and increased uncertainty as to future wholesale electricity price trends lead to the New Zealand government to re-evaluate its policy regarding local hydro development. As a result, in 1977 the government announced that they would subsidize local power station schemes of less than 50 MW by providing grants to cover the investigation and design work, cheap loans to finance construction as well as loans from the NZED to cover operating losses in the early years of approved schemes. The government established the Committee on Local Authority Hydro Development (CLAHD) to evaluate applications for grants or loans from supply authorities.

Taking up this opportunity the Bay of Plenty Electric Power Board which had begun operations in 1928 and engaged consultants to investigate a local hydro scheme in mid-1973. Preparation of a feasibility report was authorised in December 1973, with the report being completed in September 1974. The study determined that a power station on the Rangitaiki River at its confluence with the Pokairoa Stream, midway between Murupara and Whakatane. The scheme was technically feasible and financially viable. The main identified environmental impacts were significantly reduced flows over the Aniwhenua Falls, inundation of productive farm land and the displacement of one family, as well as the long term accumulation of sediment in the lake that the project would create. The issue of the reduced flow was managed by the imposing of a minimum residual flow over the falls.

The estimated cost was NZ$12.5 million.

=== Construction ===
Following the obtaining of water rights, government consent and other necessary approval, construction and equipment supply contracts were let in the second half of 1977.

The civil works which commenced by the end of 1977 constructed by Downer and Company which involved the excavation of one million tons of material and the placing of 270,000 cubic metres of fill, 20,000 cubic metres of concrete and 884 tonnes of reinforcing steel.

=== Commissioning ===
Aniwhenua began generating on 3 October 1980. The 1982 annual report for the board showed that the total cost of the station to 31 March 1982 was $27,767,203 of which $24,628,809 was financed by government loan. The book value of the scheme as at 31 March 1992 was $21,109,000. By the 1985/86 financial year, the scheme was breaking even financially and was able to trade its way into long-run profit without any write-offs of debt. Over the period from 1989 to 1992 as its trading activities were making a loss the profits from Aniwhenua kept the power board in the black.

=== Service ===
The Energy Companies Act was enacted in 1992, and amended later that year. This act required the corporatisation of the electricity and gas undertakings of electric power boards and municipalities with the aim of ensuring a commercial and efficient approach to electricity distribution and supply.

As a result, the power board was forced in August 1994 to vest all of its assets including Aniwhenua and associated water rights to the Bay of Plenty Electricity Limited. Bay of Plenty Electricity subsequently became the first electricity company to be listed on the New Zealand stock exchange.

==== Purchase by Nova Energy ====
In July 1998 the New Zealand Government passed the Electricity Industry Reform Act which was intended to change the structure of the electricity industry to encourage competition. This Act required the operational separation of distribution and generation business activities by 1 July 1999 and separation of the ownership by 1 January 2004.

As a result, in 1998 Bay of Plenty Electricity sold its retail and generation business, together with its name to Nova Energy, which was owned by the Todd Corporation. On 1 April 1999, the remaining distribution assets were transferred to a new company, Horizon Energy Distribution Limited (which operates these assets under the name of Horizon Networks).

==== Leak ====
After a serious leak developed in the dam during Nova's ownership. Following investigations and development of a solution by consultants Tonkin + Taylor, the contracting firm of Waiotahi Contractors commenced in February 2006 the 58 day repair of the leak which took 58 day at a cost NZ$2.78 million.

==== Purchase by Southern Generation Partnership ====
Looking to raise capital to invest in other energy projects in the North Island Nova agreed to sell Aniwhenua in November 2015 to Southern Generation Partnership (a partnership between Pioneer Generation Investments and Roaring Forties) for approximately NZ$100 million with ownership transferring in April 2016. The Roaring Forties is a partnership between The Power Company and Electricity Invercargill.

At the beginning of December 2018 Pioneer Energy took over the services agreement with the Southern Generation Partnership to operate and maintain the power station.

== Design ==
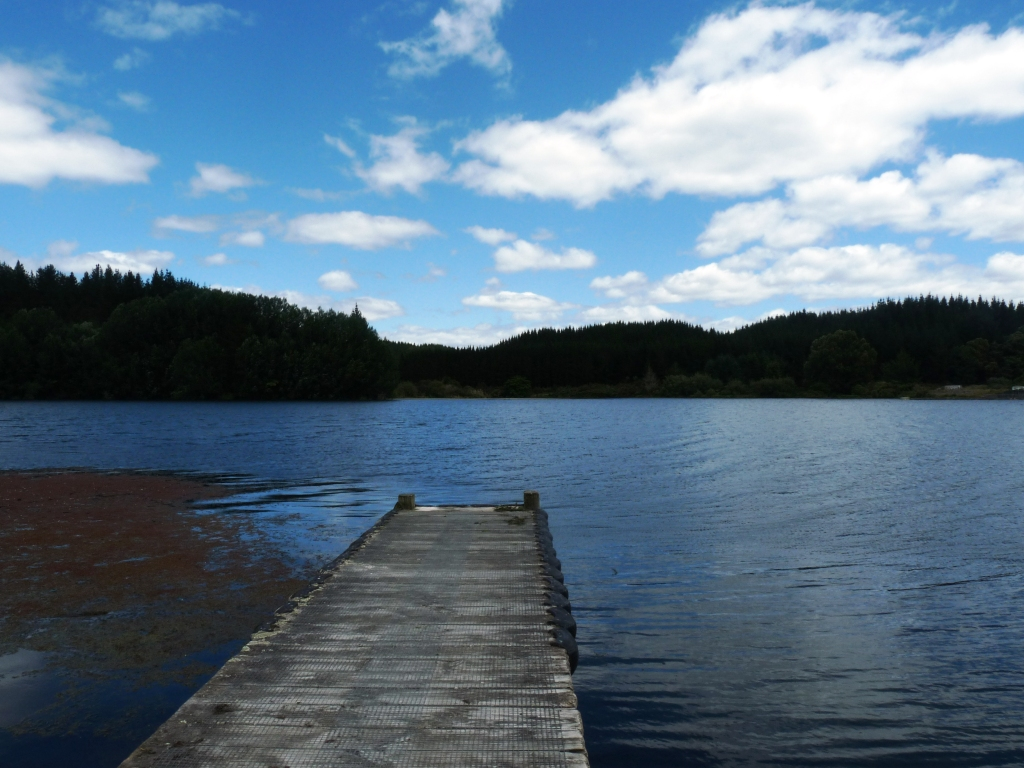
Lake Aniwhenua, the lake created by the dam.

A 200-metre-long, 10-metre-high dam located upstream of the eight-metre-high Aniwhenua Falls impounds the Rangitaiki River and Pokairoa Stream at their confluence at Black Road, Galatea, approximately 65 km upstream from the river mouth to create Lake Aniwhenua. Smaller dams also divert water from the Pokairoa into Lake Aniwhenua. The lake is 4.5 km long by approximately 500 m wide and is 255 ha in area. The maximum depth of the lake is 10 metres at the dam but it is typically less than three metres deep in other locations. The dam contains two wheeled penstock intake closure gates, two radial spillway gates which can discharge 1,270 cumecs of water. As well there are three additional flap type flood gates designed to handle higher flood conditions.

From the dam a 2.2 km long concrete-lined canal conveys water to the Pahekeheke Headpond, which was created by damming the Pahekeheke Stream. From the headpond two penstocks transport the water down to a powerhouse containing two Escher Wyss vertical Francis turbines which are each directly coupled to an ASEA 11 kV 12.5 MW synchronous generator. The station produces on average 127 GWh per annum. The output from the generating units is discharged back to the river just below the falls. The generator size was based on the desire to meet the power board's load factor of 65%.

The power station has a head of 38 metres.

Compensation water of a 2.5 cumecs is also released from the dam to preserve the original river channel and maintain flow over the falls. A small turbine coupled to a 100 kW generator is driven by the compensation flow and supplies power to the local distribution network via Horizon Energy's Galatea feeder.

Compensation water is also released from the headpond through a draw off pipe into the original course of the Pahekeheke Stream.

Via two 11/33/110 kV tertiary wound step-up transformers Aniwhenua is the primary supplier of electricity to Horizon Network's distribution network in the Galatea and Kaingaroa regions via a single 33 kV feeder that runs to Snake Hill and then splits into two feeders to supply Galatea with a further single feeder from Galatea to Kaingaroa. Any surplus above this local demand is exported via a 110 kV circuit to the Matahina Power Station where the two power stations combine to export electricity to the national grid via two 110 kV circuits to Transpower's Edgecumbe Substation.

== Operation ==
For transmission pricing purposes a Prudent Discount Agreement exists for Aniwhenua that makes it part of the Edgecumbe GXP. Aniwhenua is operated to maximise injection into the Horizon network. If there is any generation in excess of local load, this is exported to the national grid. As a result, the power station is effectively embedded.

Operation of the power station is covered by the requirements of five resource consents, with the principal consent expiring in September 2026. The lake level operates between a normal operating range of 146.1 to 146.8 metre RL (relative to the Moturiki datum) with the emergency spillway having a level of 148.6 metre RL. The power station operates as a run of river scheme as the lake is small in terms of river flow. Low overnight demand allows refilling of the lake and drawdown to provide increased generation over the daytime peaks. and

The power station typically generates at least 8 MW, as below this value it will be necessary to spill water which will impact on the river downstream.

There is an ongoing programme to transfer migrating elvers and eels both upstream and downstream from the lake, to maintain eel stocks.

=== Sedimentation ===
The headwaters of the Rangitaki River collect lightweight pumice sands and partly greywacke gravels which are deposited in the lake. During its first 15 years of operation the lake accumulated approximately 1.5 million m3 of sediment. Loss of storage has been managed by constructing training banks to encourage the sediment to settle in the deeper areas of the lake as well as lowering of the lake and flushing during floods.

In addition, it has been necessary to undertake limited dredging operations to remove sedimentation with 30,000 m3 removed in 2002.

== See also ==
- Hydroelectric power in New Zealand
