= Omanawa River =

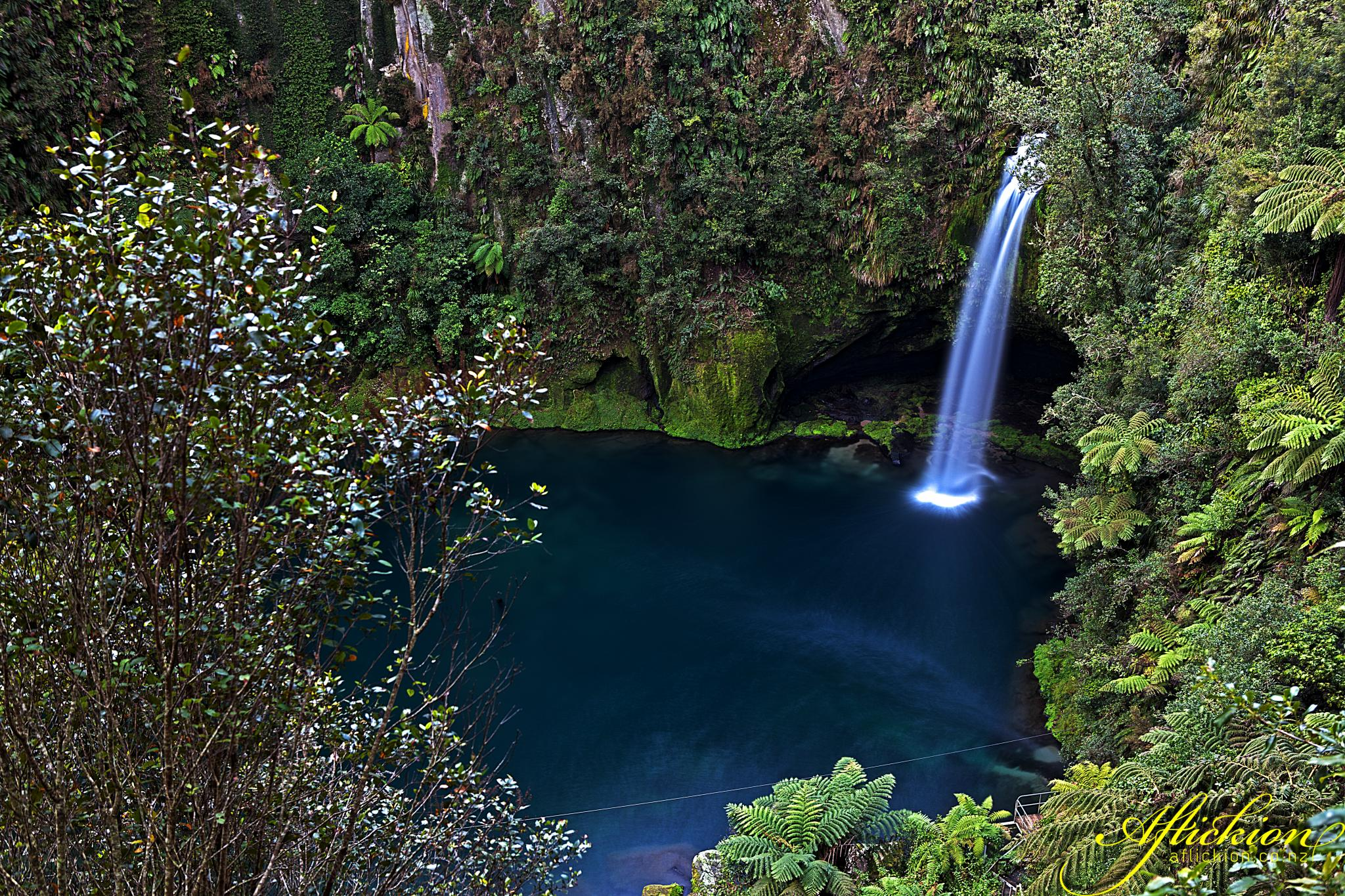
- Omanawa Falls
- Route of the Omanawa River
- Mouth of the Omanawa River Omanawa River (North Island)

Location
- Country: New Zealand

Physical characteristics
- Source
  - coordinates: 37°58′01″S 176°05′40″E
- Mouth
  - location: Wairoa River
  - coordinates: 37°45′37″S 176°04′18″E
- Length: 25 km (16 mi)

Basin features
- Progression: Omanawa River → Wairoa River → Tauranga Harbour → Bay of Plenty → Pacific Ocean
- Tributaries
  - right: Upokokotio Stream
- Waterfalls: Omanawa Falls
- Bridges: Ōmanawa River Bridge

The Omanawa River is a river of the Bay of Plenty Region of New Zealand's North Island.

The New Zealand Ministry for Culture and Heritage gives a translation of "place of Manawa" for Ōmanawa.

== Geography ==
An important tributary of the Wairoa River it flows north from the northern edge of the Mamaku Plateau, through a valley to enter a 122 m (400 ft) long narrow gorge through which the river flows in a series of rapids before 11.3 km (7.0 mi) above the confluence with the Wairoa the river drops 35 metres over the Omanawa Falls. At the base of the falls is a large deep pool approximately 100 metres in diameter. At the back and under the lip of the falls, the river has hollowed out a huge cavern. To one side of the falls is the Omanawa Falls Power Station which is powered by water diverted around the falls.

The Omanawa joins the Wairoa River about 9.7 km (6.0 mi) from its mouth and 10 km (6.2 mi) southwest of Tauranga.

== See also ==
- List of rivers of New Zealand
