= Pātea Dam =

Hydroelectric dam in Taranaki, New Zealand

Coordinates: 39°32′46″S 174°34′13″E

The Pātea Dam is a high compacted earth fill–type hydroelectric dam in Taranaki, New Zealand, constructed between 1980 and 1984.

The dam is 82 metres (269 ft) high, and is the fourth highest dam in New Zealand. It was the first dam constructed using tertiary sandstone and siltstone as fill materials. The dam impounds the Pātea River and formed Lake Rotorangi, which is the longest man-made lake in New Zealand (46 kilometres (29 mi)).

== Pātea Hydro Electric Scheme ==
The Pātea Hydro Electric Scheme was commissioned in May 1984 and was built for the Egmont Electric Power Board. After construction difficulties, wetter than normal weather had caused a six-month delay. Since 1999 it is owned and operated by Manawa Energy. With three 10.5 MW vertical Francis turbine generator sets and one 700 kW auxiliary generator, the scheme has a total capacity of 33 MW and an average annual output of 118 gigawatt-hours (420 TJ).
