= Coleridge Power Station =

Dam in Canterbury, New Zealand

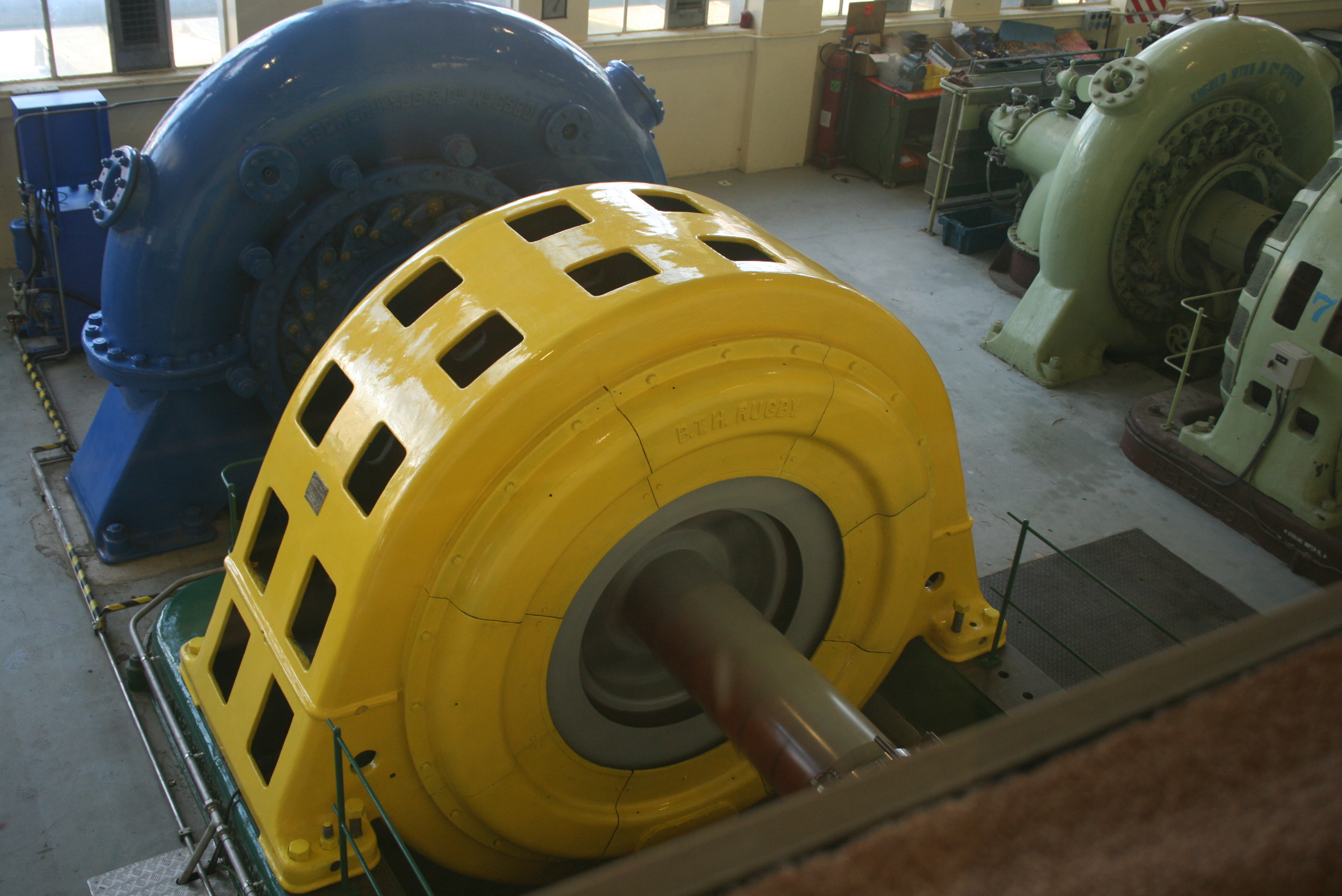
- Horizontal turbine (BTH) at Lake Coleridge power station
- Interactive map of Coleridge Power Station
- Country: New Zealand
- Location: Canterbury
- Coordinates: 43°21′51″S 171°31′37″E
- Status: Operational
- Construction began: 1911
- Owner: Contact Energy

Reservoir
- Creates: Lake Coleridge

Power Station
- Commission date: 1914
- Type: Conventional
- Turbines: 3 (1914), 9 (1930), 5 (today)
- Installed capacity: 39.5 MW (53,000 hp); 4.5 MW (6,000 hp) (1914); 34.5 MW (46,300 hp) (1930)
- Annual generation: 270 gigawatt-hours (970 TJ)

The Coleridge Power Station is a hydroelectric facility at Lake Coleridge on the Rakaia River in Canterbury, New Zealand. The power station is owned and operated by Manawa Energy (formerly Trustpower).

== History ==
Coleridge was New Zealand's first major power station in which the state was involved. It was constructed mainly to supply electricity to Christchurch, with construction beginning in 1911 and completed with three generating units in 1914. For the most part it was built by hand, with some heavier work done by steam shovels. Following its initial construction, the twin 66 kV transmission lines connecting the power station with Christchurch's Addington substation were the highest voltage in New Zealand, and the longest at over 100 kilometres (62 mi) long.

In the early years of the station, demand for electricity in Christchurch grew rapidly and the transmission system extended to reach Rangiora in the north and Oamaru in the south. The limited capacity at Coleridge resulted in regular interruptions to supply. To remedy this the fourth generator was connected in April 1917, with two more connected in November 1921 and March 1922. The turbine hall was extended in 1924 to make room for additional larger turbines. By the early 1930s, Coleridge had reached capacity, and was supplemented in 1934 by the commissioning of the Waitaki Dam and in 1935 by extending transmission lines south to join Coleridge/Waitaki to Dunedin's Waipori scheme.

Water supply was a challenge, and so three river diversions were made to increase the amount of water available in the lake: the Harper River in 1922, the Acheron River in 1930, and later the Wilberforce River in 1977.

The station was built and initially owned by the New Zealand Government through the Hydro Electric Branch of the Public Works Department, which this branch later became the State Hydro Electric Department in 1946, which in turn became the New Zealand Electricity Department (NZED) in 1958, which then became the Electricity Division of the Ministry of Energy in 1978. In 1987, the government dissolved its responsibility for electricity to create a state-owned enterprise called the Electricity Corporation of New Zealand (Electricorp). Electricorp began downsizing staff and upgrading systems at the facility, and in 1994, it was restructured into two subsidiaries. One subsidiary, Transpower, adopted responsibility for the outdoor switching yard, with the parent company planning to sell the facility at Coleridge. After Ngāi Tahu waived their right of first refusal to the facility, in 1998 the facility was purchased for $90.6 million by both Alpine Energy and Trustpower. Alpine Energy was only involved in the deal to circumvent a rule that the station could only be sold to a South Island company, with Alpine withdrawing from the scheme in 1998. The facility has been owned by Trustpower (now Manawa Energy) since.

== Technical details ==
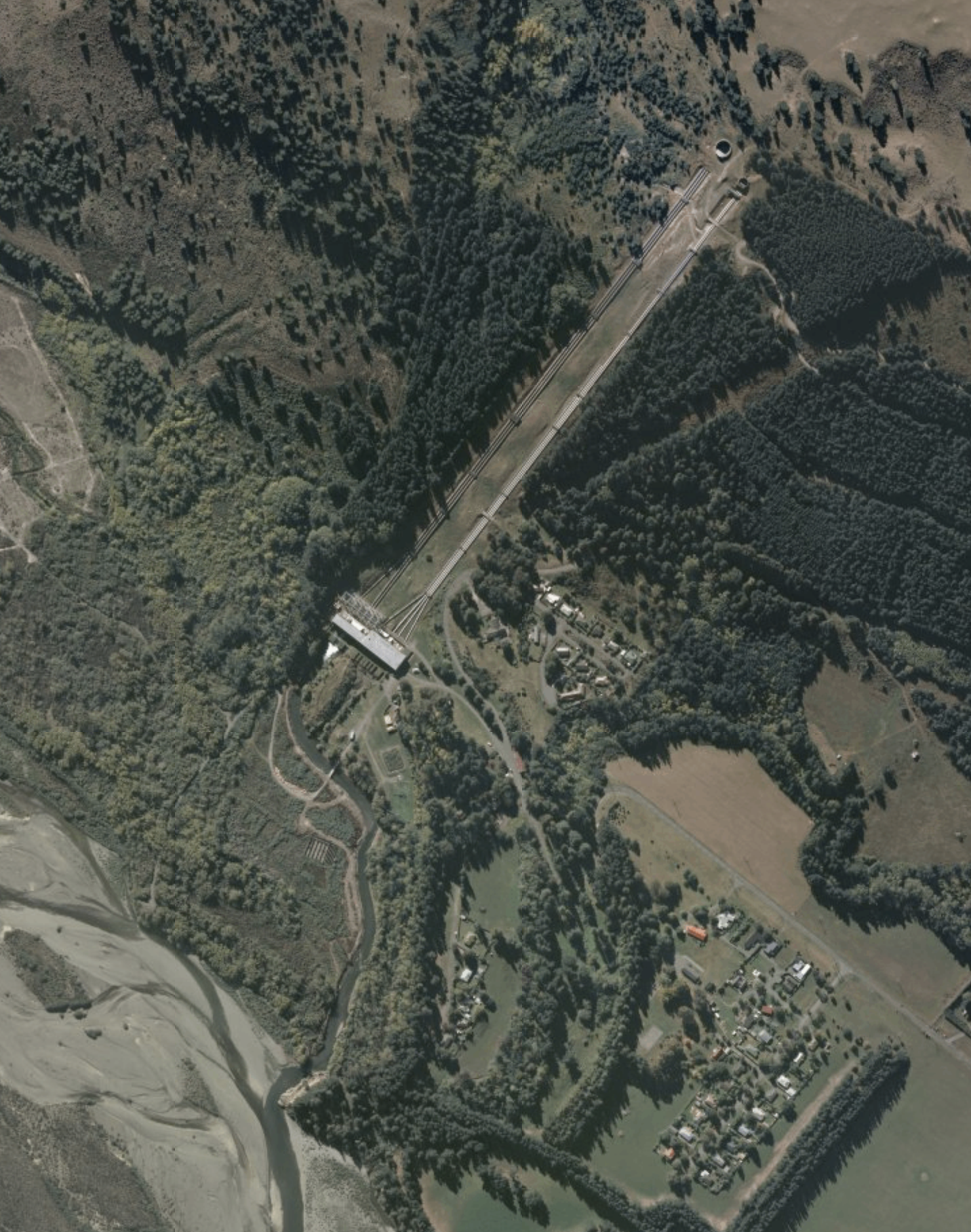
Aerial view of the facility, showing the distinctive penstock pipes running down the hill between the surge chambers and the turbine hall.

As of 2020, the station has a generation capacity of 39 megawatts (52,000 hp) of electricity, and annual generation averages 270 gigawatt-hours (970 TJ).

Coleridge is unusual in that it does not use a dam like most other hydroelectric facilities. Lake Coleridge is a natural lake that runs alongside a natural river, but at a much higher elevation. Water is fed to the station from two inlets at the lake, which is elevated 165 metres (541 ft) above the station's turbine hall. The newer No. 1 inlet is visible up at the lake as a whirlpool on calm days, with some of the older No. 2 inlet visible on the shore near to it. These inlets supply water to two horseshoe-shaped tunnels which run almost horizontally (grade of 1:1000) through approximately 2.2 kilometres (1.4 mi) of the hill between the lake and the power station. These tunnels terminate in large concrete surge chambers above the power station, which in turn connect to the distinctive steel penstock pipes that run down the hill above-ground to the turbine hall. The older No. 2 surge chamber is 12 metres (39 ft) in diameter and connects to the original set of 1.32 metres (4 ft 4 in) diameter penstock pipes. Originally there were four of these pipes, however only two remain in use, with the other two disconnected half way up the hill. The newer No.1 surge chamber is 19 metres (62 ft) in diameter and connects to an additional set of three penstock pipes that taper from 2.14 metres (7 ft 0 in) at the top of the run to 1.5 metres (4 ft 11 in) at the bottom, which are used to power the newer and larger set of turbines. The water is discharged to the Rakaia River.

While it initially started with 3 turbines, this was increased to 9 by 1930 with a total power output of 34.5 megawatts (46,300 hp). Currently only 5 turbines are operational, but despite having four fewer turbines than in 1930 they produce 75 gigawatt-hours (270 TJ) more energy due to modern redesign and refurbishment using computational fluid dynamics modelling, completed in 2008.

Coleridge was the first station in the world to use aerated draft tubes on the turbines, invented on-site by Silston Cory-Wright to solve an issue with heavy thumping when under load. It was also the first to be built on glacial morraine, which caused significant issues with stability of the turbine hall.

The open-air switching yard supplies 66kV lines that run both east (connecting to the Transpower switch yard at Hororata and from there on to Christchurch) and west (across the Southern Alps via Arthur's Pass to supply the West Coast).

=== Turbines ===
All turbines are of the horizontal Francis type.

Turbines Commissioned at Coleridge
Number	Date Commissioned	Wattage	Status
1	1930	7,500 kilowatts (10,100 hp)	Active
2	1927	7,500 kilowatts (10,100 hp)	Active
3	1926	7,500 kilowatts (10,100 hp)	Active
4	1914	1,500 kilowatts (2,000 hp)	Decommissioned
5	1914	1,500 kilowatts (2,000 hp)	Decommissioned
6	1914	1,500 kilowatts (2,000 hp)	Decommissioned
7	1917	1,500 kilowatts (2,000 hp)	Decommissioned
8	1921	3,000 kilowatts (4,000 hp)	Active
9	1923	3,000 kilowatts (4,000 hp)	Active

== See also ==
- Electricity sector in New Zealand
