= Avoca River (Canterbury) =

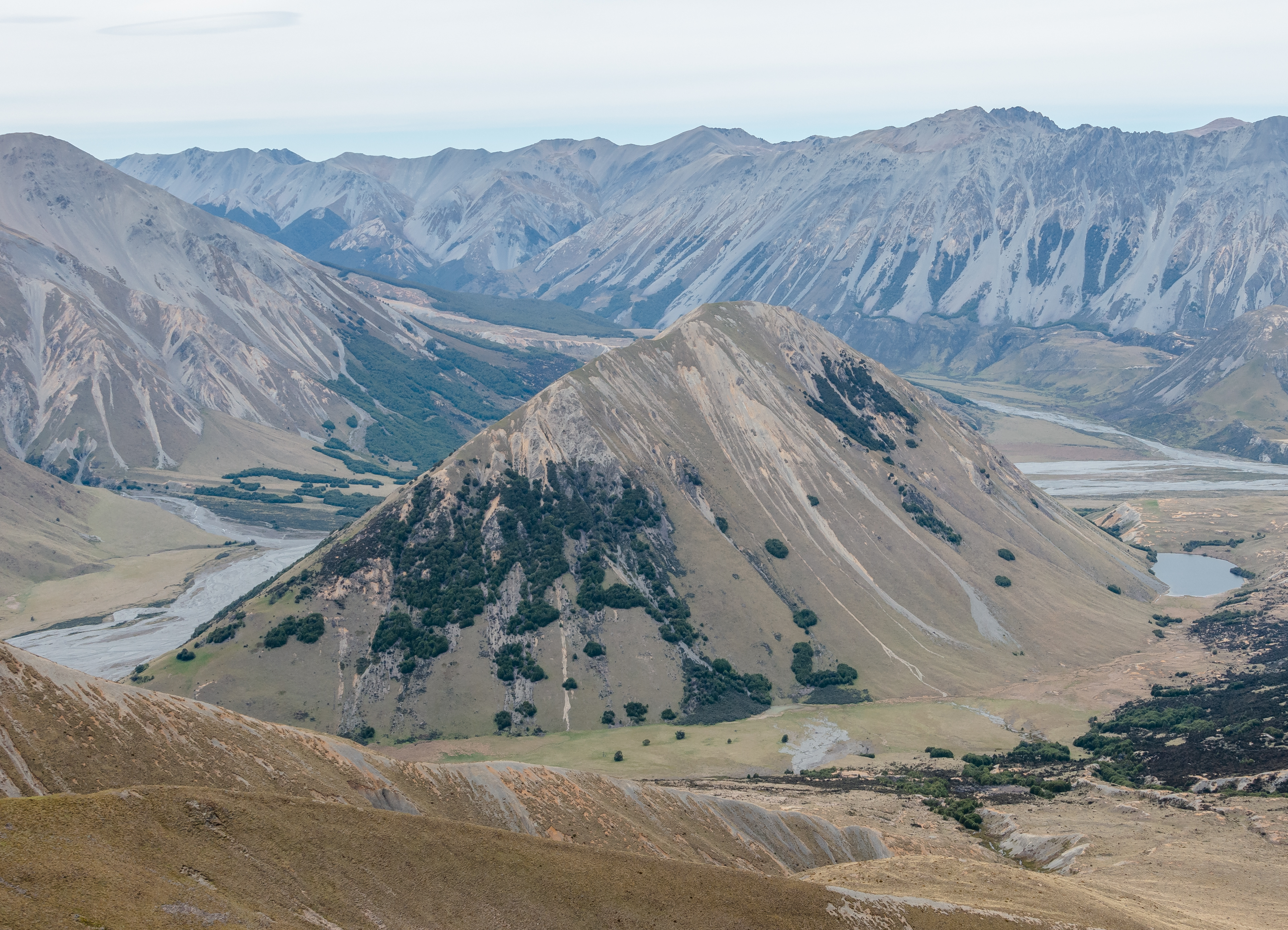
- Mount Fitzwilliam, with the Avoca River on the left

- Location within New Zealand
- Etymology: Presumed to be named after Avoca Homestead and the station of the same name in the area

Location
- Country: New Zealand
- Region: Canterbury
- District: Selwyn District

Physical characteristics
- Source: Moraine Flat
  - coordinates: 43.0488°S 171.4244°E
  - elevation: 1,075 metres (3,527 ft)
- Mouth: Harper River
  - coordinates: 43.1816°S 171.5481°E
  - elevation: 630 metres (2,070 ft)
- Length: 21.4 kilometres (13.3 mi)

Basin features
- Progression: Harper River→ Lake Coleridge→ Rakaia River→ Canterbury Bight
- Tributaries
  - left: Easy Stream, Blind Creek, Galilee Creek, Amphitheatre Creek, Centre Creek
  - right: Hanging Valley Creek, Basin Creek, Mid Basin Creek, Triangle Creek, Lillian Creek

The Avoca River is a river in the Canterbury region of New Zealand. It is a minor tributary of the Rakaia River via the Harper and Wilberforce Rivers, south of Arthur's Pass in Canterbury.
