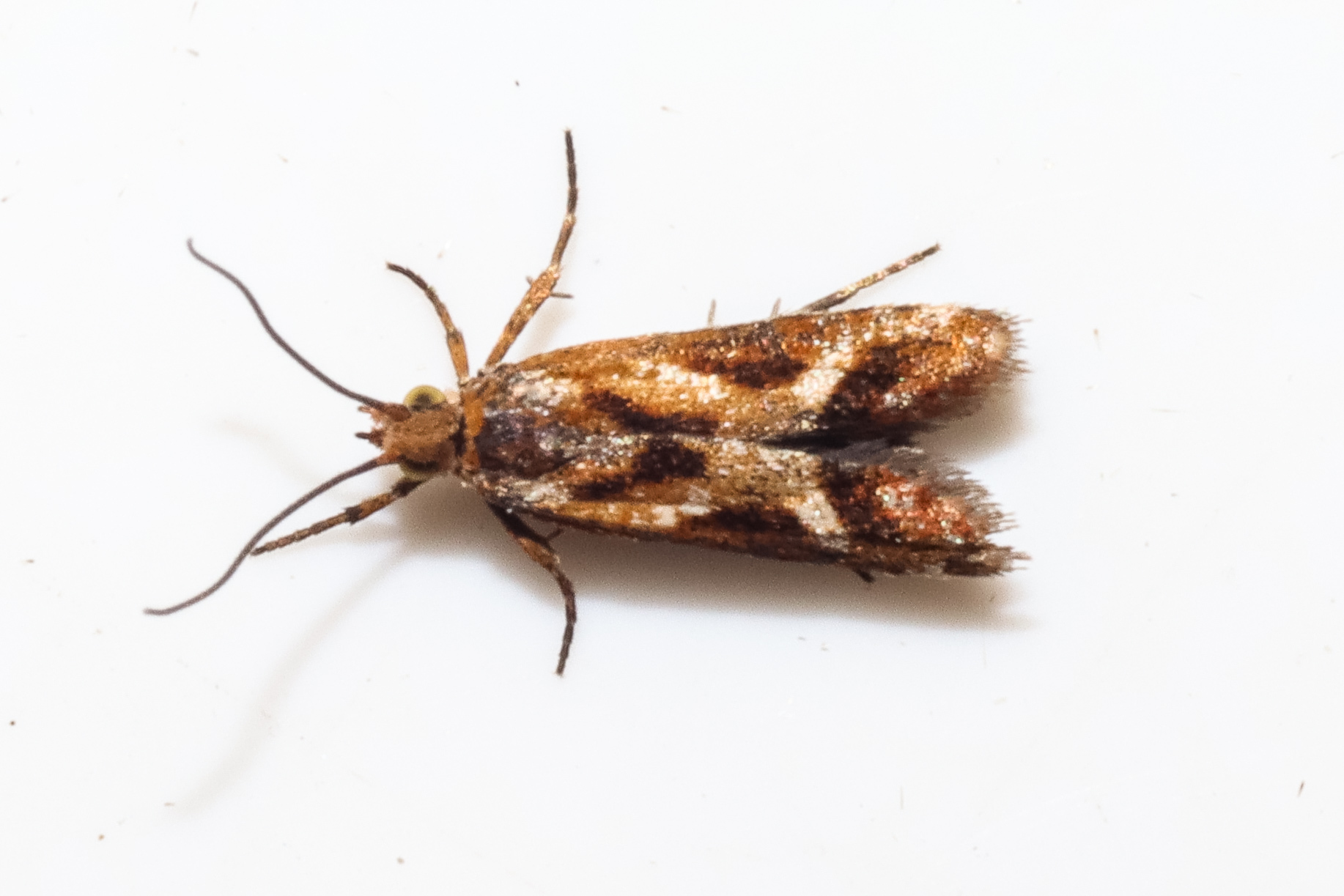

Scientific classification
- Kingdom: Animalia
- Phylum: Arthropoda
- Clade: Pancrustacea
- Class: Insecta
- Order: Lepidoptera
- Family: Tortricidae
- Genus: Protithona
- Species: P. fugitivana

Binomial name
- Protithona fugitivana Meyrick, 1882

Synonyms
- Eucosma fugitivana (Meyrick, 1882); Eurythecta varia Philpott, 1916; Raumatia varia (Philpott, 1916)

= Protithona fugitivana =

Species of moth endemic to New Zealand

Protithona fugitivana is a species of moth of the family Tortricidae. It was first described by Edward Meyrick in 1882. This species is endemic to New Zealand and has been observed in the North and South Islands. The larvae are semiaquatic and can be found in and around seepages and damp areas. Larvae feed on species in the genus Potamogeton. They pupate in grass or turf areas. The adult female is slightly larger than the adult male and are a more greyish fuscous in appearance. Adults are on the wing in December and February.

== Taxonomy ==
P. fugitivana was first described by Edward Meyrick in 1882. In 1883 Meyrick gave a fuller description of the species. In 1911 Meyrick placed this species in the genus Eucosma. In 1916 Alfred Philpott, thinking he was describing a new species, named this moth Eurythecta varia. George Hudson, following Meyrick, discussed this species under the name Eucosma fugitivana in his 1928 book The butterflies and moths of New Zealand. In the same book Hudson also discussed and illustrated this species under the name Eurythecta varia. Philpott synonymised this latter name into Eucosma fugitivana in 1931. In 1988 John S. Dugdale discussed this species under the name Protithona fugitivana. The male holotype specimen, collected at Lake Coleridge, is held at the Natural History Museum, London.

== Description ==
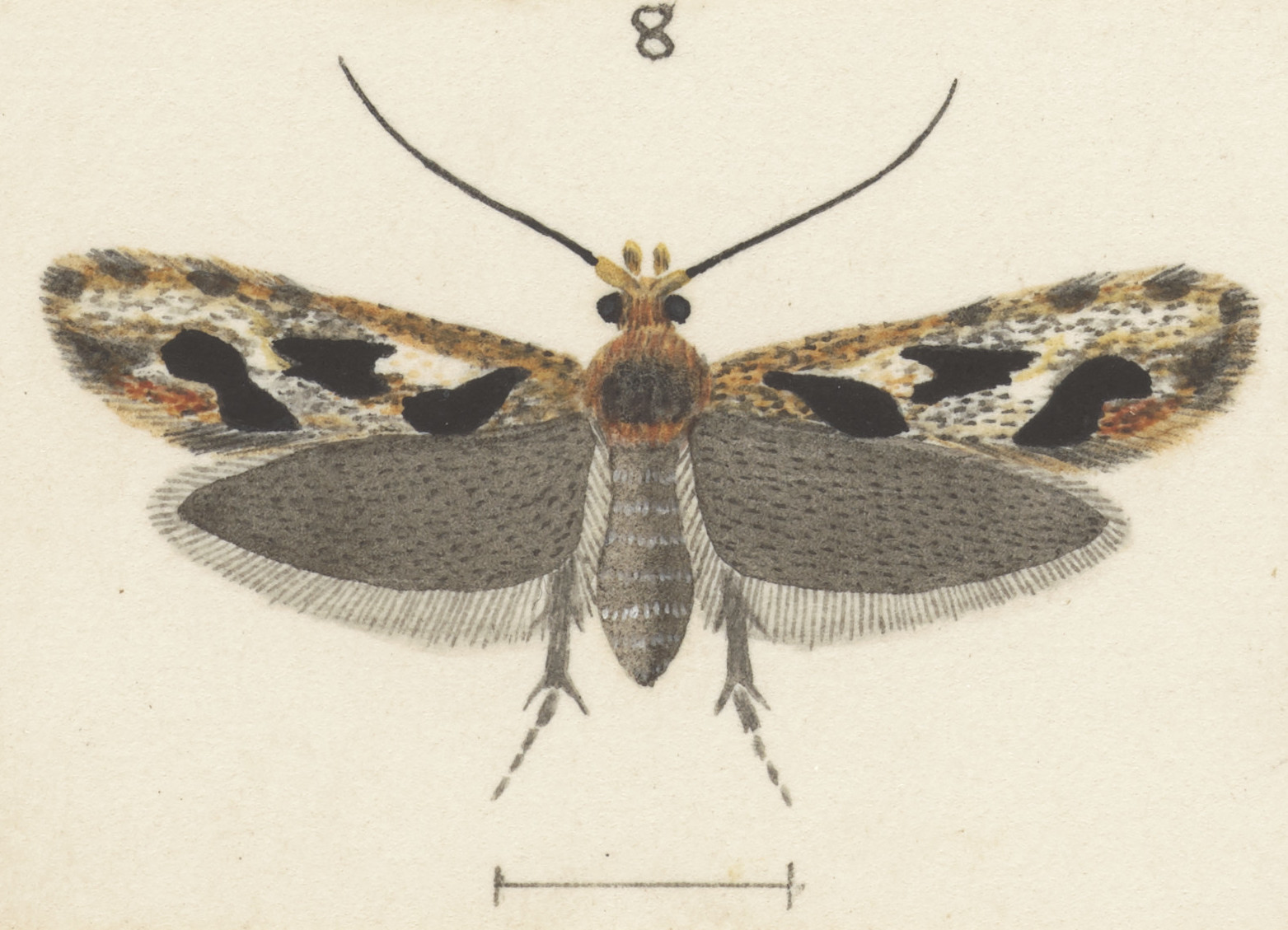
Illustration by George Hudson c. 1927

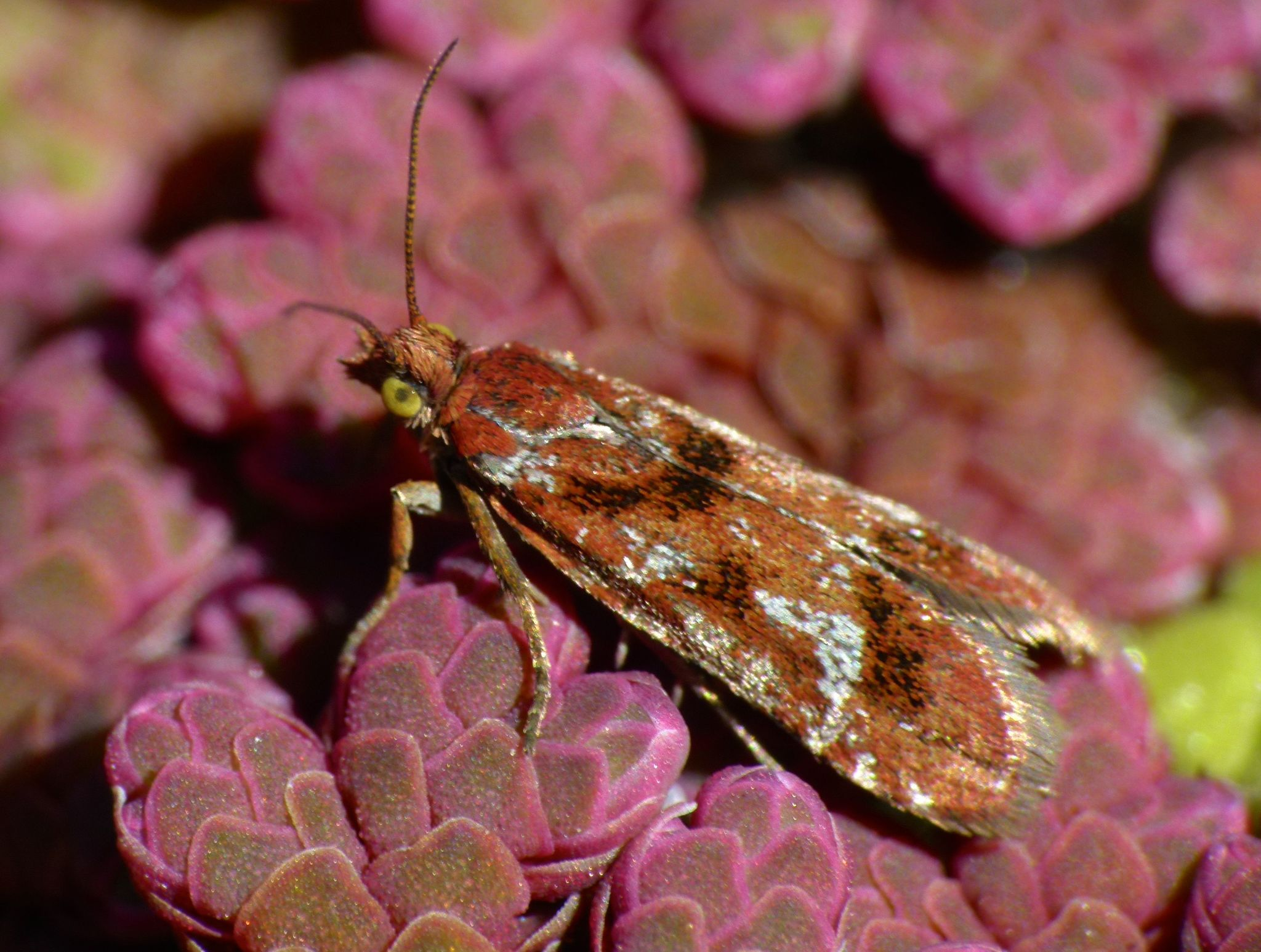
P. fugitivana.

Meyrick described the species as follows:

Male.—8 mm. Head, palpi, thorax, and abdomen pale greyish-ochreous, mixed with fuscous. Antennae dark fuscous. Legs whitish-grey-ochreous, anterior and middle tibiae and all tarsi suffused with dark fuscous, except at apex of joints. Forewings narrow, costa moderately arched, hindmargin very obliquely rounded; light greyish-ochreous ; a suffused elongate blackish patch in disc above middle ; an inwardly oblique suffused blackish mark on inner margin before middle, before which the ground-colour is somewhat mixed with blackish ; an outwardly oblique slightly curved broad blackish spot from inner margin before anal angle, extending suffusedly to apex ; the space between these three blackish marks is ochreous-whitish, which colour is suffusedly produced along submedian fold to base; three small suffused dark fuscous spots on costa towards apex: cilia ochreous-whitish, mixed with dark fuscous towards base. Hindwings fuscous-grey; cilia ochreous-grey-whitish.

The wingspan is 9–10 mm for males and 10–12 mm for females. The forewings are dull to bright ochreous, mixed with dark fuscous. There is a white or pale-ochreous streak from the base to one third of the wing, margined beneath by a dark-fuscous blotch. The forewings of the females are almost wholly suffused with greyish fuscous. The hindwings are greyish fuscous.

== Distribution ==
This species is endemic to New Zealand. It has been observed in the North and South Islands.

== Habitat and host species ==
The larvae of this moth is semiaquatic and can be found in and around seepages or on surface detritus near moist areas. The larvae feed on Potamogeton species.

== Behaviour ==
Larvae pupate in turf. Adults of this species are on the wing in December and March. When the adults are disturbed they often alight on nearby water.
