= Lake Browning / Whakarewa =

Lake in the South Island of New Zealand

- Whakarewa (Māori)
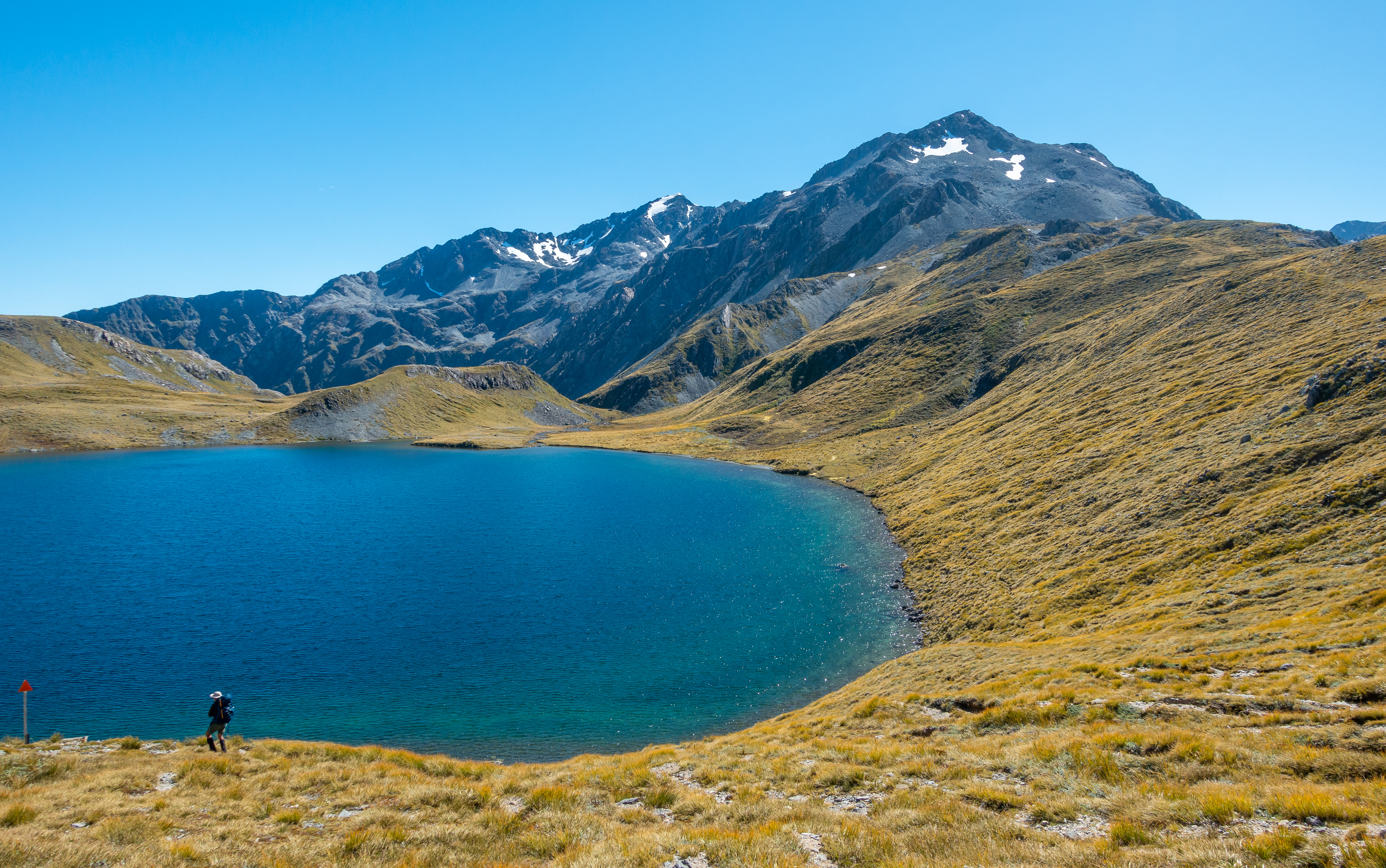
- Lake Browning, photo taken from Three Passes Track, New Zealand

- Location within New Zealand
- Location: Browning Pass / Nōti Raureka, West Coast Region, South Island
- Coordinates: 42.947°S 171.344°E
- Type: tectonic lake
- Primary inflows: Browning Pass / Nōti Raureka
- Primary outflows: Arahura River
- Catchment area: Arahura
- Basin countries: New Zealand
- Max. length: 0.52 kilometres (0.32 mi)
- Max. width: 0.42 kilometres (0.26 mi)
- Surface area: 0.162 square kilometres (0.063 sq mi)
- Surface elevation: 1,360 metres (4,460 ft)

Lake Browning / Whakarewa is a small lake (0.162 km^{2} or 0.063 sq mi) situated on the Main Divide of the Southern Alps in New Zealand. It is 130 km (81 mi) northwest of Christchurch.

The lake occurs in a tectonically-controlled depression formed by a dilational jog or fault stepover along the Main Divide Fault. This depression is also the location of Browning Pass / Nōti Raureka, a mountain pass connecting the upper reaches of the Wilberforce River with the West Coast. The pass was one of the first routes used by local Māori to cross from one side of the Southern Alps to the other.

The lake waters feed into the Arahura River, which drains to the West Coast. The climb to Lake Browning from the west, up the Arahura River, is considerably more gentle than the steep scree-slope descent into the Wilberforce River on the east of the Main Divide.

The lake is named after John Browning who was part of the early European surveying party who first negotiated the pass, which is also named for him. In 1998, the name was officially changed to the current dual name of Lake Browning / Whakarewa as part of the Treaty of Waitangi settlement with Ngāi Tahu.
