= John Browning (surveyor) =

British surveyor in New Zealand (1831–1909)

- Born: John Samuel Browning; 1831; Norfolk, England
- Died: 24 July 1909 (aged 77–78)
- Engineering career
- Discipline: Sailor; Surveyor; Civil Engineer
- Institutions: New Zealand Institute of Surveyors

John Samuel Browning (1831 – 24 July 1909), also known as John Spence Browning, was a British-born pioneer surveyor in the South Island of New Zealand.

== Life ==
John Browning was born in Norfolk, England in 1831. Browning's family held shipping interests, which in September 1844 at the age of just thirteen, would lead to him travelling to the East Indies. Later, at the age of 24, he would navigate the Pacific (1855–1856) as captain of the whaling vessel Susan. Browning first arrived in New Zealand in 1856 to trade with goods from Australia.

In 1857, Browning entered the New Zealand Government Service as an assistant surveyor and draughtsman with the Canterbury Public Works Department. In 1862, on closure of the afore-mentioned department, he became Assistant Surveyor with the newly formed Lands and Survey Department and was employed in exploring the mountain passes between Canterbury and the West Coast. He later became District and Mining Surveyor, and set up the Survey Department in Hokitika. In 1876 he was appointed Chief Surveyor at Nelson, as well as being appointed Commissioner of Crown Lands in 1891 a position he held until his retirement on 1 October 1896.

== Wilberforce expedition ==
In 1864–65, at the commencement of the gold rush era on the West Coast, John Browning and others were sent to explore the passes over the Main Divide in the Southern Alps with the object of finding a practicable route for a road. Browning was part of an exploring party along with Richard James Strachan Harman (after whom Harman Pass is named), and J. J. Johnstone, who in April 1865 negotiated the pass on the basis of information supplied by an elderly Māori man living in Kaiapoi. This pass (Māori: Nōti Raureka) was subsequently named Browning Pass and the small lake at the pass given the name Lake Browning (Māori Whakarewa). One of the peaks overlooking the pass was called Mount Harman (Māori: Kaniere, 1,900 m (6,200 ft)) after party member Richard Harman.
