= Browning Pass =

Browning Pass may refer to:

- Browning Pass / Nōti Raureka, in the Southern Alps of New Zealand
- Browning Pass (Antarctica), in the Victoria Land region of Antarctica
- Browning Pass, a maritime feature near Port Hardy on the north of Vancouver Island, Canada
