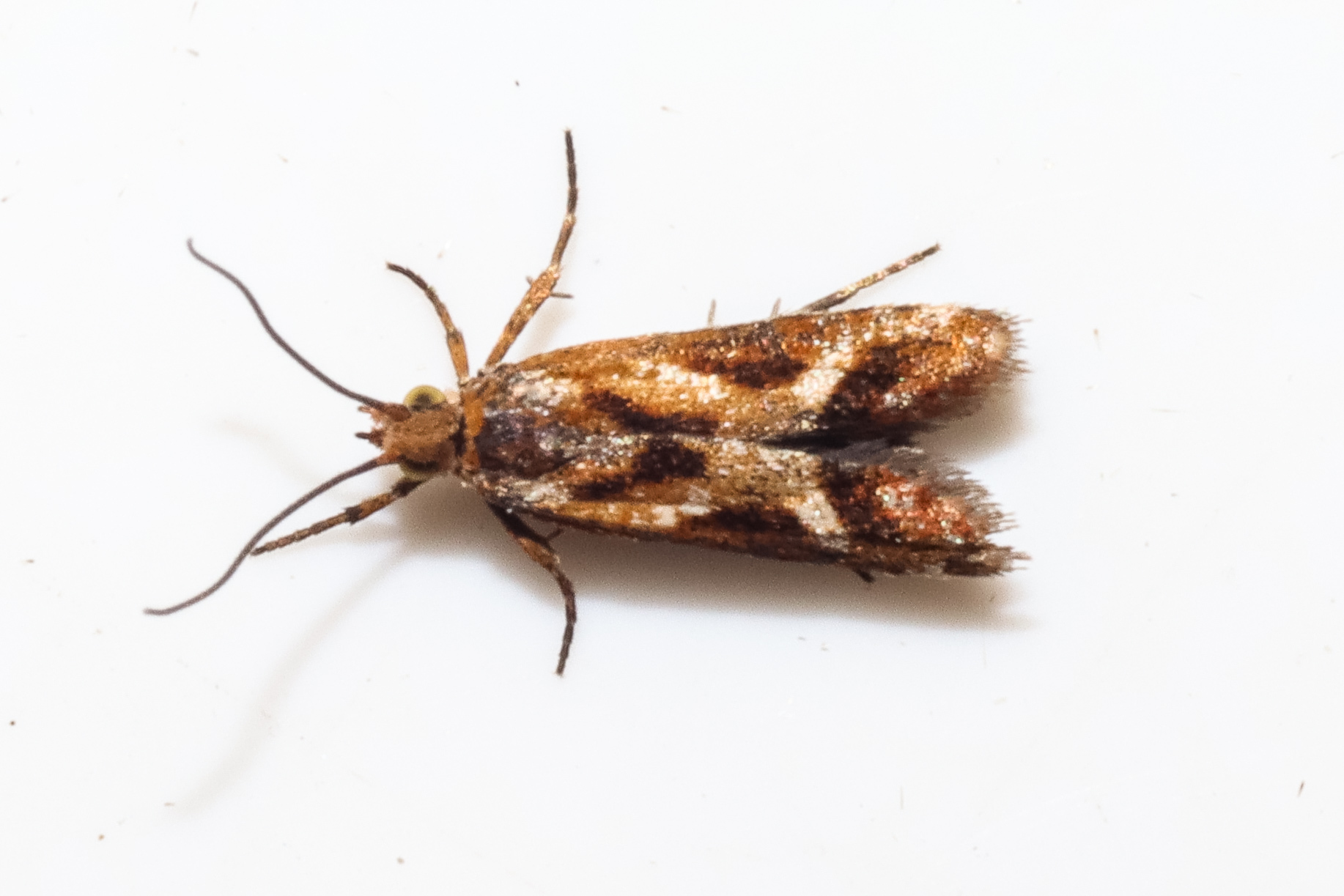
- Protithona fugitivana

Scientific classification
- Kingdom: Animalia
- Phylum: Arthropoda
- Clade: Pancrustacea
- Class: Insecta
- Order: Lepidoptera
- Family: Tortricidae
- Tribe: Eucosmini
- Genus: Protithona; Meyrick, 1882

Synonyms
- Raumatia Philpott, 1928 (nomen nudum)

= Protithona =

Genus of tortrix moths

Protithona is a genus of moths belonging to the family Tortricidae. This genus was first described by Edward Meyrick in 1882. In 1883 Meyrick gave a fuller description of the genus. Species in this genus are only found in New Zealand.

== Species ==
- Protithona fugitivana Meyrick, 1882
- Protithona potamias (Meyrick, 1909)

== See also ==
- List of Tortricidae genera
