= Browning Pass / Nōti Raureka =

- Māori: Nōti Raureka
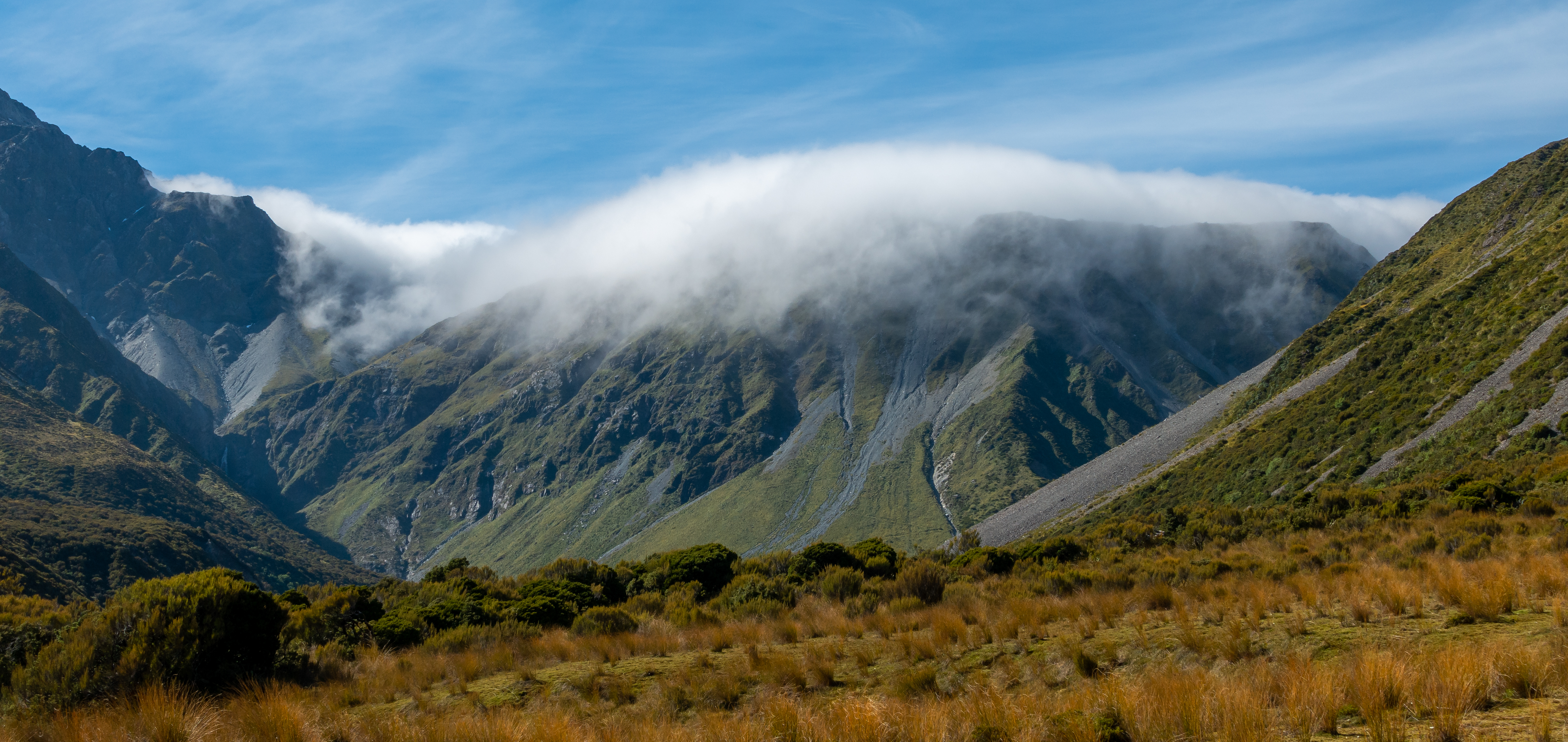
- Browning Pass from Three Passes Track

- Location within New Zealand
- Elevation: 1,411 metres (4,629 ft)
- Traversed by: Foot track (Three Passes route)

Third Approach
- Location: Canterbury
- Range: Southern Alps
- Coordinates: 42.9501°S 171.3444°E

Browning Pass / Nōti Raureka is a mountain pass across the Southern Alps, on the South Island of New Zealand. The pass reaches an elevation of 1,411 metres (4,629 ft) above sea level, connecting the upper reaches of the Wilberforce River with the West Coast.

== History and name ==
According to Māori tradition, Nōti Raureka was originally discovered by a woman belonging to Kāti Wairaki, a formerly Taranaki-based iwi which had settled on the West Coast. The woman, Raureka, arrived in what is now South Canterbury by way of the pass, where she was found by a party of Ngāi Tahu. Raureka demonstrated the strength of her pounamu adze when compared to tools used by local Māori and described the route by which she arrived on the eastern side of the island. This prompted further exploration of the region at the head of the Rakaia River along with the route described by Raureka, with the Māori name for the pass – Nōti Raureka – being named in her honour. At this point, relations between Ngāi Tahu and Kāti Wairaki were tense, owing to a breakdown of discussions during previous Ngāi Tahu attempts to meet with Kāti Wairaki to learn about their knowledge of the island. With the discovery of Nōti Raureka, a Ngāi Tahu party under the leadership of Te Rakitāmau crossed into the West Coast, causing relations between the two iwi to erupt into open conflict. Fighting continued for roughly three to four generations, with Ngāi Tahu eventually taking control of the West Coast and the associated pounamu trade.

By the time of European settlement, the route over Nōti Raureka had mostly fallen into disuse in favour of other, safer routes. An effort during the 1860s by the Reverend Canon James West Stack to identify traditional Māori routes across the Southern Alps found only one elderly man who had travelled the route himself, with all other knowledge coming from oral histories of the route. The elderly man sketched landmarks of the route, however, including Lake Browning / Whakarewa on the western side of the pass and a cave near its base. Shortly after Stack's work, a track for stock driving was created over the pass in order to supply the goldfields of the West Coast with a supply of fresh meat from Canterbury farms. As commerce between the coasts progressed, there were calls to develop the route into a road over the pass. However, as other routes were developed (such as the nearby Arthur's Pass), this was scaled back to maintenance of the pack track due to cost.

European surveyors who crossed the pass in 1865 drew lots to determine which of them the summit lake should be named after; Robert Browning was the winner. In 1998, the name was officially changed to the current dual name of Browning Pass / Nōti Raureka as part of the Treaty of Waitangi settlement with Ngāi Tahu.

== Geography ==
Browning Pass / Nōti Raureka is located on the main divide of the Southern Alps, roughly 18 km (11 mi) due west from the town of Arthur's Pass. The Canterbury side of the pass, to the south, follows the Wilberforce River valley south towards Lake Coleridge. From the valley floor, the route ascends roughly 300 metres (980 ft) in altitude to reach the pass itself. Immediately to the north of the pass is Lake Browning / Whakarewa, at an altitude of 1,360 metres (4,460 ft). The route then continues in a northwesterly direction, following the headwaters of the Arahura River towards the West Coast. An alternate route crosses Styx Saddle, heading due west along the Styx River instead.
