= Harman River =

River in New Zealand

Coordinates: 42°54′56″S 171°19′27″E

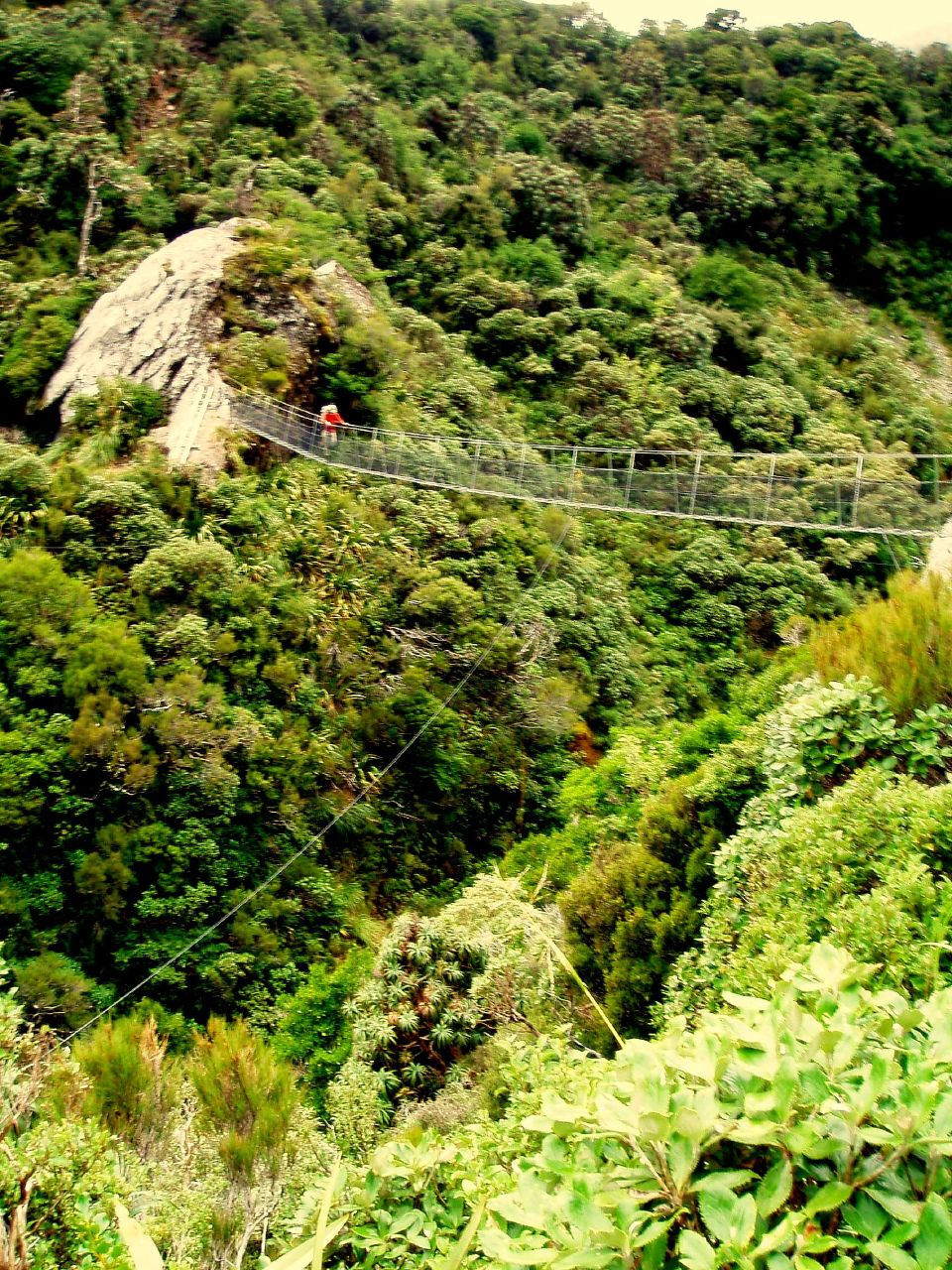
- Suspension bridge over the Harman River

Location
- Country: New Zealand

Physical characteristics
- Source
  - location: Southern Alps
- Mouth
  - location: Arahura River

The Harman River is a river of New Zealand. It starts in the Browning Range of the Southern Alps and becomes the Arahura River, which flows into the Tasman Sea north of Hokitika.

The river can be reached on foot using the Styx Valley track.

The river is named for R.J.S. Harman, a Canterbury surveyor, who discovered the nearby Harman Pass in 1865.

== See also ==
- List of rivers of New Zealand
