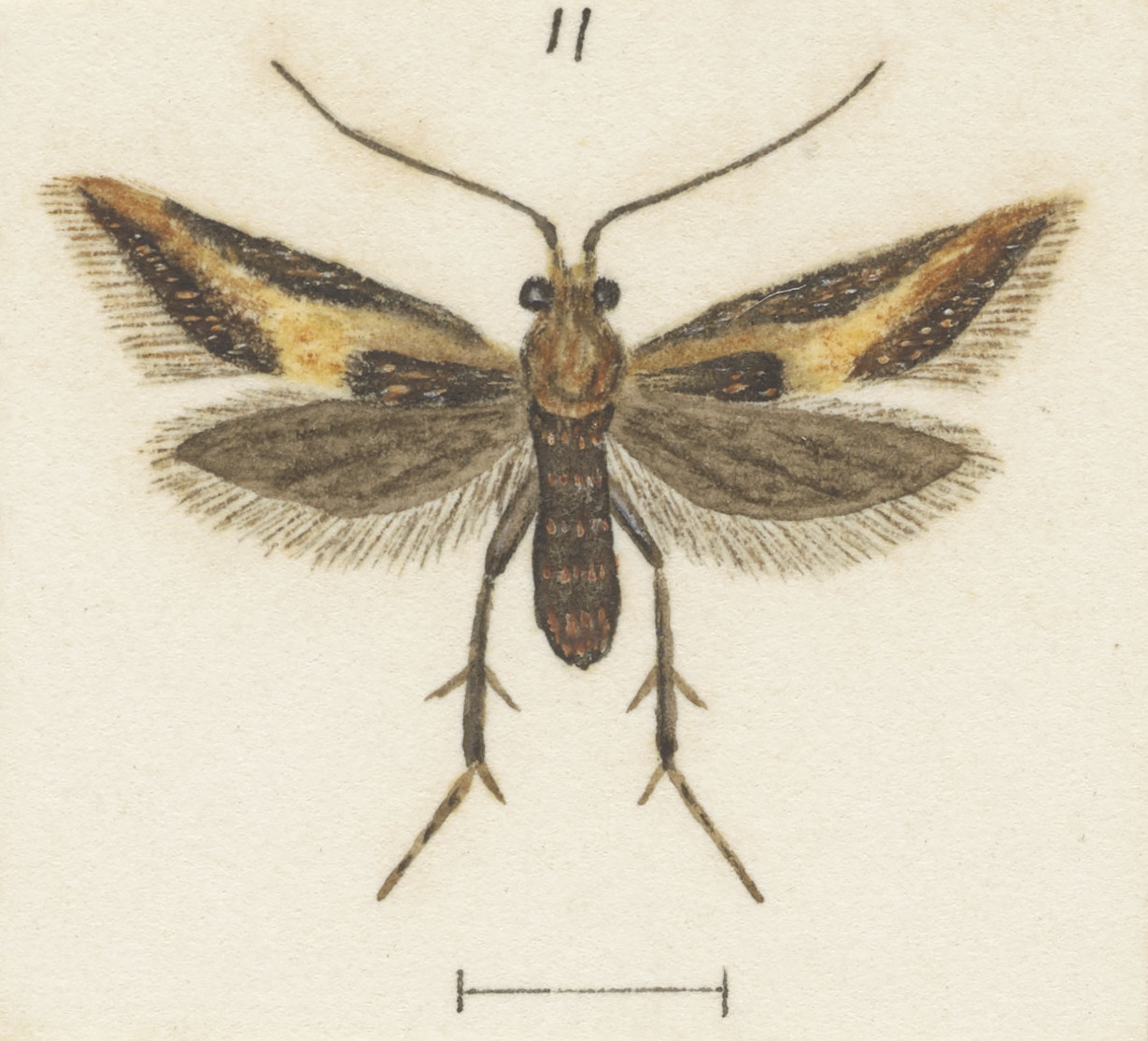

Scientific classification
- Kingdom: Animalia
- Phylum: Arthropoda
- Clade: Pancrustacea
- Class: Insecta
- Order: Lepidoptera
- Family: Tortricidae
- Genus: Protithona
- Species: P. potamias

Binomial name
- Protithona potamias (Meyrick, 1909)

Synonyms
- Eurythecta potamias Meyrick, 1909; Raumatia potamias (Meyrick, 1909); Eucosma potamias (Meyrick, 1909)

= Protithona potamias =

Species of moth endemic to New Zealand

Protithona potamias is a species of moth in the family Tineidae and was first described by Edward Meyrick in 1909. This species is endemic to New Zealand.

== Taxonomy ==
This species was first described by Edward Meyrick in 1909 and originally named Eurythecta potamias. George Hudson discussed and illustrated this species under this name in his 1928 book The butterflies and moths of New Zealand. Hudson, in 1939, subsequently placed this species in the genus Eucosma. The male lectotype specimen, collected at Riverton / Aparima by Alfred Philpott, is held at the Natural History Museum, London.

== Habitat and hosts ==
This species likely inhabits salt-tolerant grasses found amongst sandhills. Larvae of this species inhabit the riparian zone and is likely hosted by species of grass. They pupate amongst grasses.
