= Turbine hall =

Building within which electricity-generating turbines are located

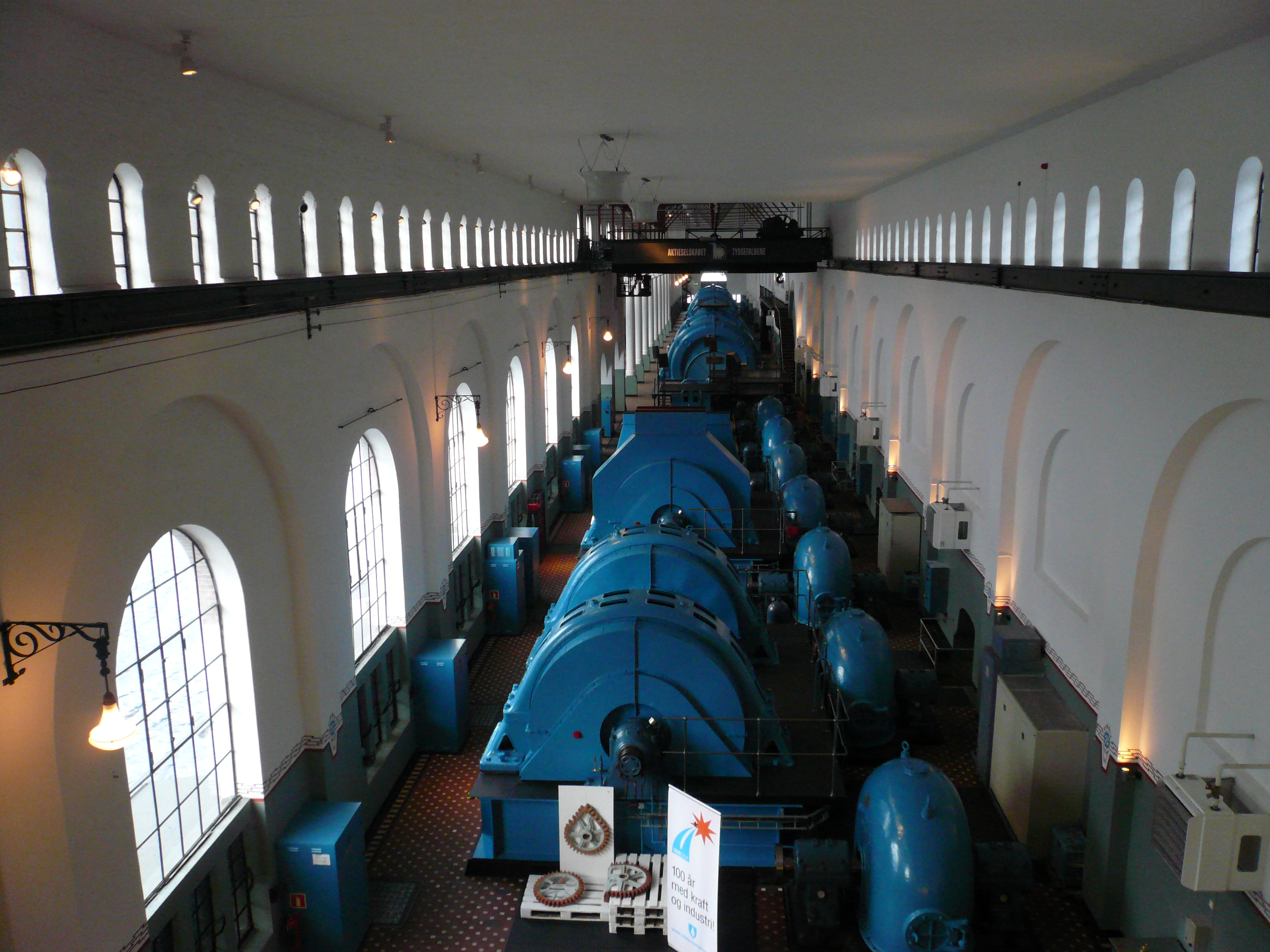
Turbine hall in the Tyssedal hydroelectric power station in Norway. Note the overhead crane along the length of the hall, for moving in and out machinery.

The turbine hall, generating hall or turbine building is a building or room in any steam cycle or hydroelectric power plant which houses a number of components vital to the generation of electricity from the steam that comes from the boiler, or from the water coming from the reservoir.

== Components ==
The components in the turbine hall typically are the turbines and electric generators, and in the case of steam cycle plants, moisture separators and reheaters. A turbine hall is typically extremely loud, and in the case of steam cycle plants, hot.

The turbine hall is of sufficient height to enable plant and equipment to be lifted and removed, sometimes vertically, for maintenance or replacement. The hall is often equipped with a travelling crane to facilitate such movements.

== Challenges ==
In nuclear power plants, boiling water reactors present unique challenges since the steam going through the turbines may be radioactive. This means that the turbine hall has to be slightly contained and much unique maintenance must be performed. A typical plant will house one high-pressure turbine and two low-pressure turbines.

== See also ==
- Boiler
- Turbine
