= Harper River =

Coordinates: 43°13′S 171°25′E

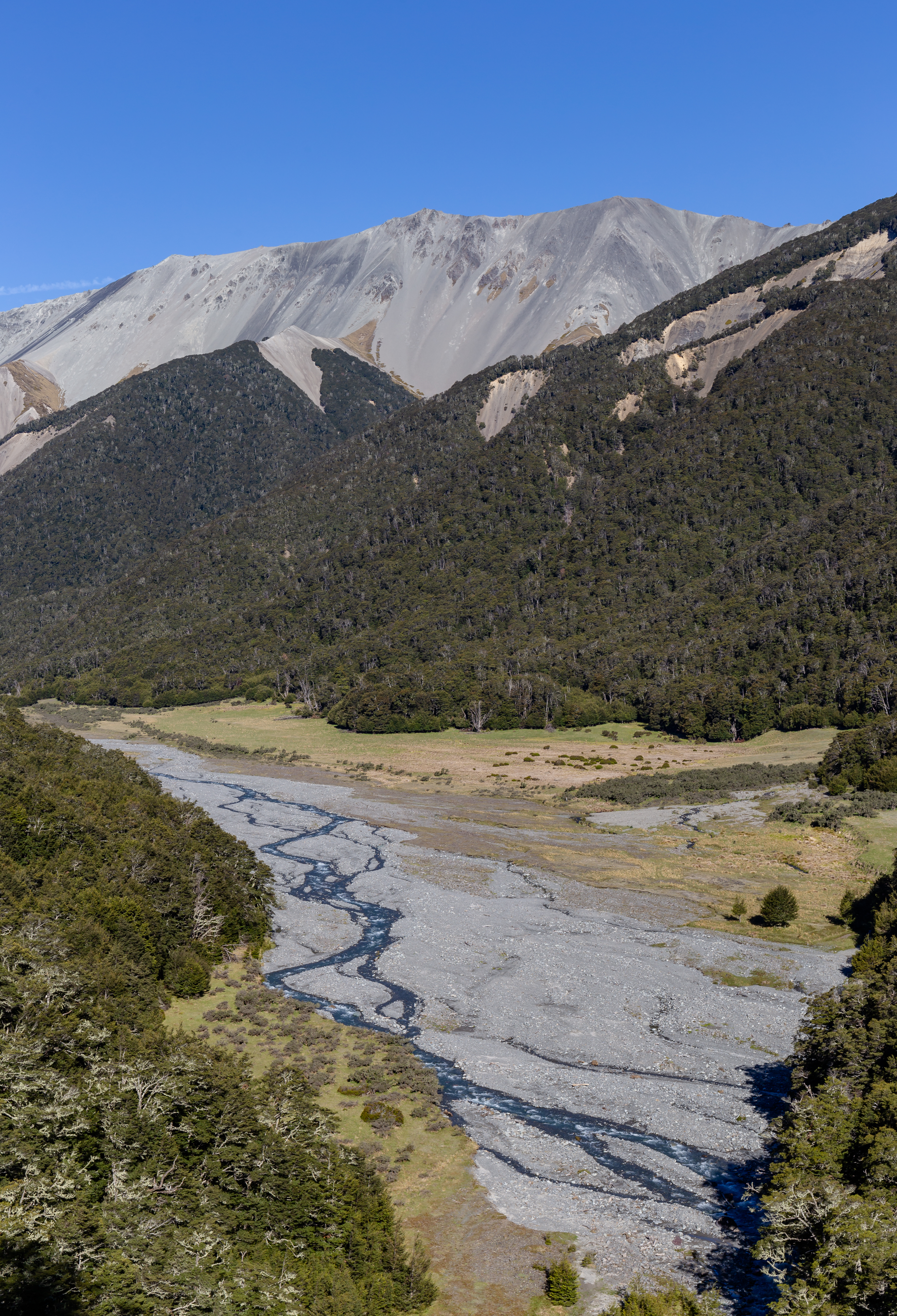
- Harper River by its confluence with Hamilton Creek (2019)

- Location of the mouth within New Zealand

Location
- Country: New Zealand

Physical characteristics
- Source
  - location: Southern Alps
- Mouth
  - location: Wilberforce River

The Harper River is a tributary of the Wilberforce River which itself flows into the Rakaia River in New Zealand's Canterbury region. It is located in the Southern Alps and a pass in the Harper River headwaters leads into the Waimakariri River catchment. One of the most popular tramping routes in Canterbury enters the East Harper via Cass Saddle and exits via Lagoon Saddle at the head of the West Harper.

The waters of the Harper River and its major tributary, the Avoca River, are channelled into Lake Coleridge via a structure known as the Harper Diversion which was constructed in 1921 as part of a hydroelectricity project.

The Harper Avoca catchment has been the site of much ecological research since the mid-1950s.

It is well serviced by huts on Lagoon and Cass Saddles, the West Harper, Hamilton Hut at the junction of the two branches of the Harper, Avoca Hut in the headwaters of the Avoca, two huts at Back Basins Creek, a small two man hut up Back Basins Creek and a larger hut that can be rented off Glenthorne Station near the junction of the Avoca and Harper Rivers. The Harper is comparatively well documented by early European explorers including Julius von Haast and Samuel Butler.
