= Arahura River =

River in the West Coast Region of New Zealand

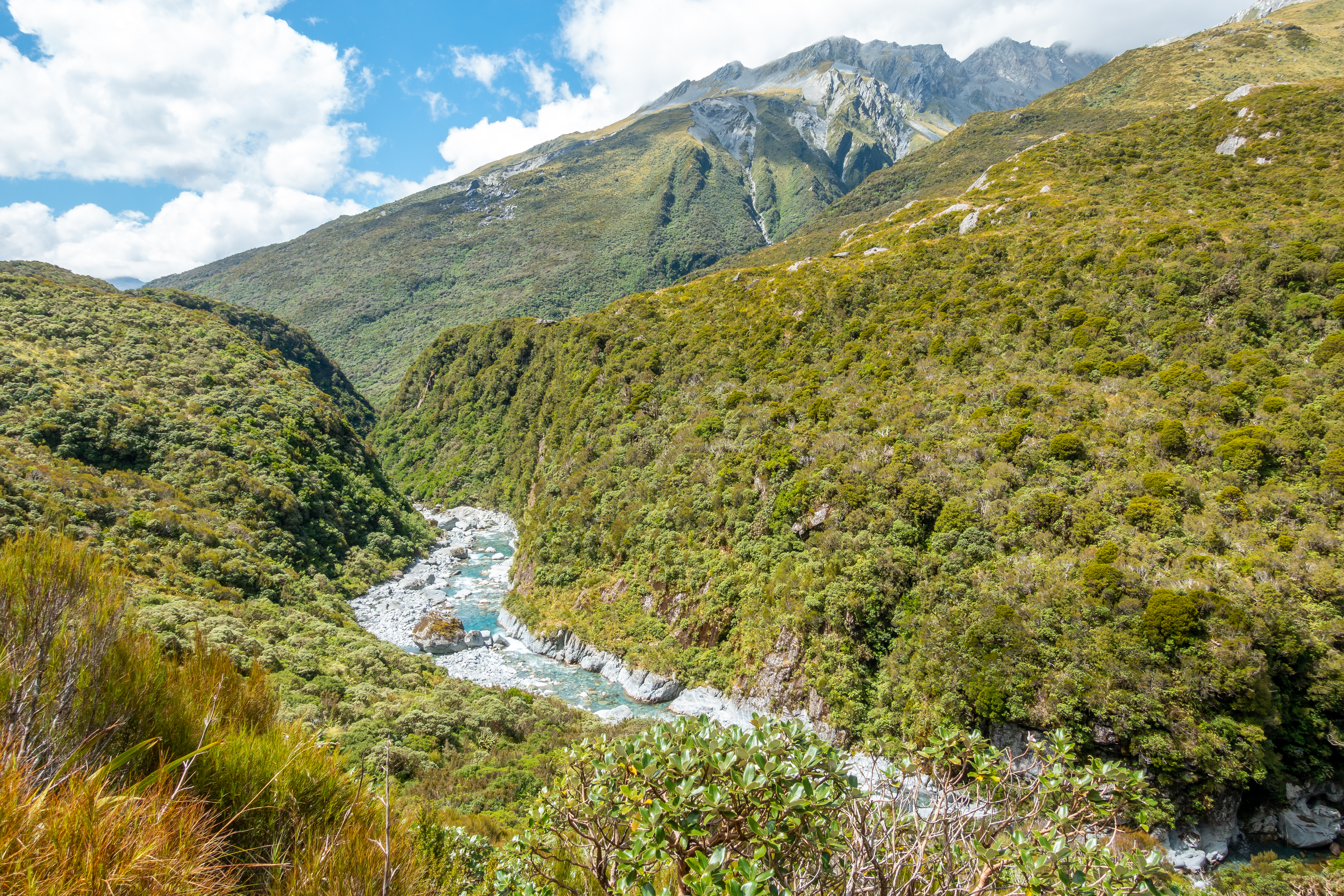
- Arahura River seen from Three Passes Track.
- Route of the Arahura River
- Mouth of the Arahura River Arahura River (South Island)

Location
- Country: New Zealand
- region: West Coast Region
- District: Westland District

Physical characteristics
- Source: Lake Browning / Whakarewa
  - location: Southern Alps / Kā Tiritiri o te Moana
  - coordinates: 42.947°S 171.344°E
  - elevation: 1,360 m (4,460 ft)
- Mouth: Tasman Sea
  - location: Arahura Pa
  - coordinates: 42°40′S 171°02′E
  - elevation: 0 m (0 ft)
- Length: 56 km (35 mi)

Basin features
- Tributaries
  - left: Harman River

The Arahura River, for a time called the Brunner River after the explorer Thomas Brunner, is a river located on the West Coast of the South Island of New Zealand. In 1846, Brunner and Heaphy sketched and described a Māori settlement they called Araura [sic] (Arahura).

It is approximately 56 kilometres (35 mi) in length and flows into the Tasman Sea eight kilometres north of Hokitika, next to the Arahura Pa. The Harman River is an early stage tributary.

It is an important place to Māori for the resource of pounamu (greenstone), only found in a few places in the South Island of New Zealand. When the region was sold to the British Crown in 1860 by the chiefs of Poutini Ngāi Tahu, the rights to pounamu on the Arahura River were meant to be retained, these rights were ignored in the deed (Arahura Deed). In 1990s, Ngāi Tahu and the government negotiated for ownership of pounamu from the river to be restored and this was settled in the Ngāi Tahu (Pounamu Vesting) Act 1997.

The lower reaches of the Arahura River were a major producer of gold in the past – and extensively mined, but are now worked out.

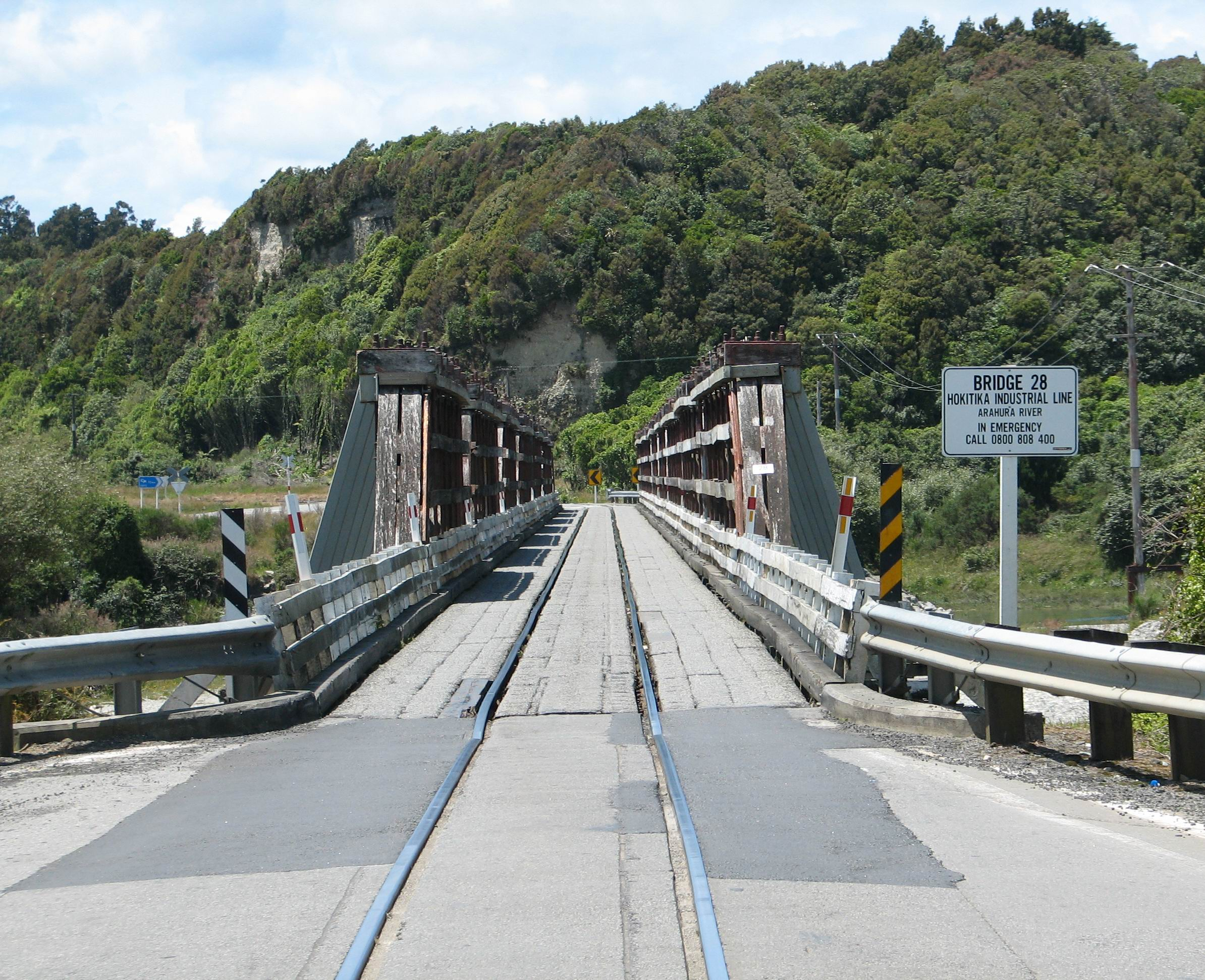
The historic Arahura road/rail bridge. It was replaced in 2009.

In 2009, the 120-year-old dual road/rail bridge across the river was replaced. Sections of the old bridge were reused elsewhere on the rail network and one complete span was retained for a local heritage park.

The river is the subject of a 2016 song of the same name by Marlon Williams.
