= Wilberforce River =

Coordinates: 43°20′S 171°26′E

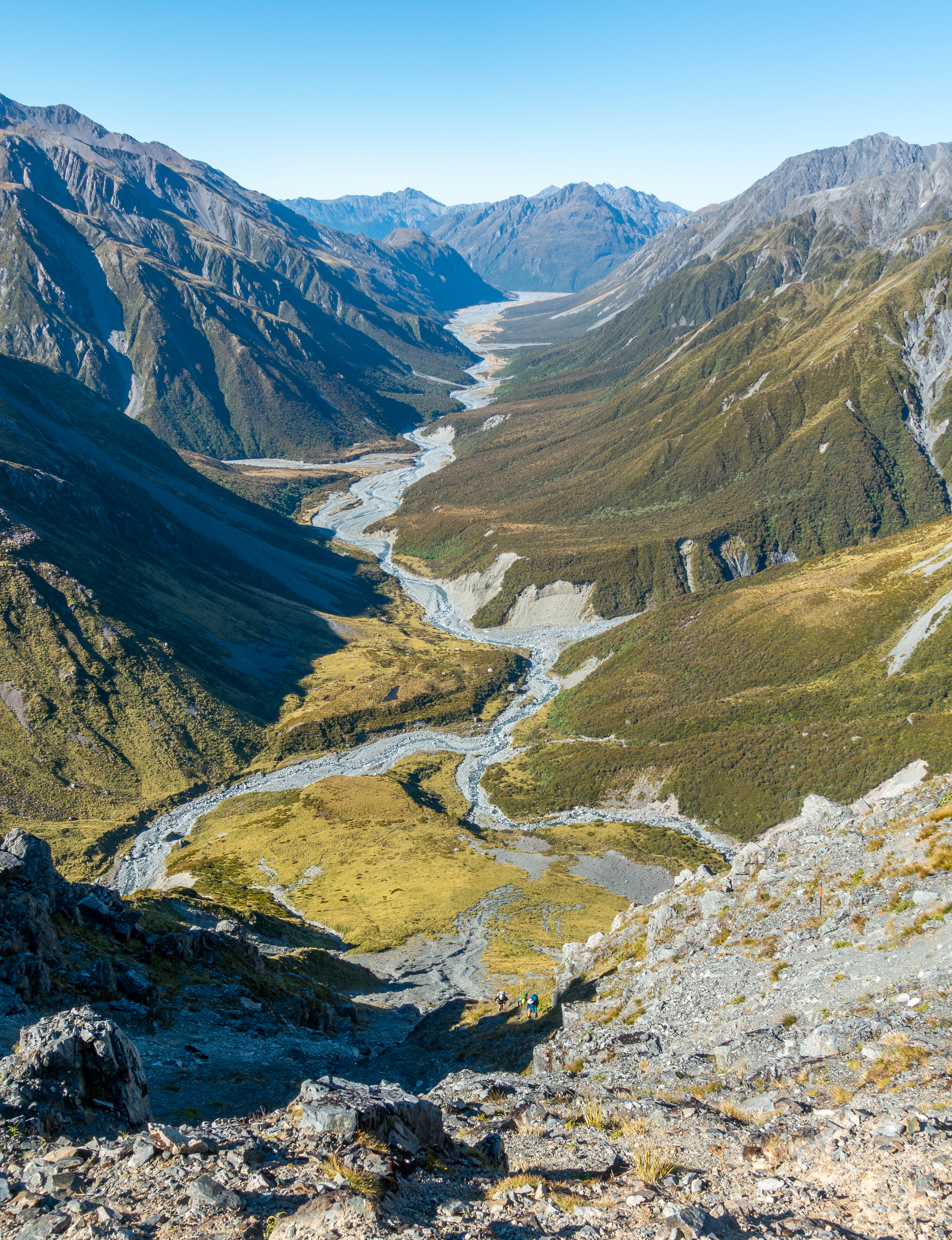

- Location of the mouth within New Zealand

Location
- Country: New Zealand

Physical characteristics
- Source
  - location: Southern Alps
- Mouth
  - location: Rakaia River

The Wilberforce River is a river in the Southern Alps of New Zealand. It is located in western Canterbury and is naturally a tributary of the Rakaia River, but like the Harper River, it has had some of its flow diverted into Lake Coleridge as part of a hydroelectricity project. This diversion boosted the output of the Coleridge Power Station and was established in 1977.

An early proposal for the route of the Midland Line railway from Christchurch to Westland involved extending the Whitecliffs Branch to the West Coast via the Wilberforce River and Browning Pass / Nōti Raureka. This was one of the proposals rejected in favour of a route via Arthur's Pass.
