= Lake Coleridge =

Lake in the South Island of New Zealand

- Whakamatau (Māori)
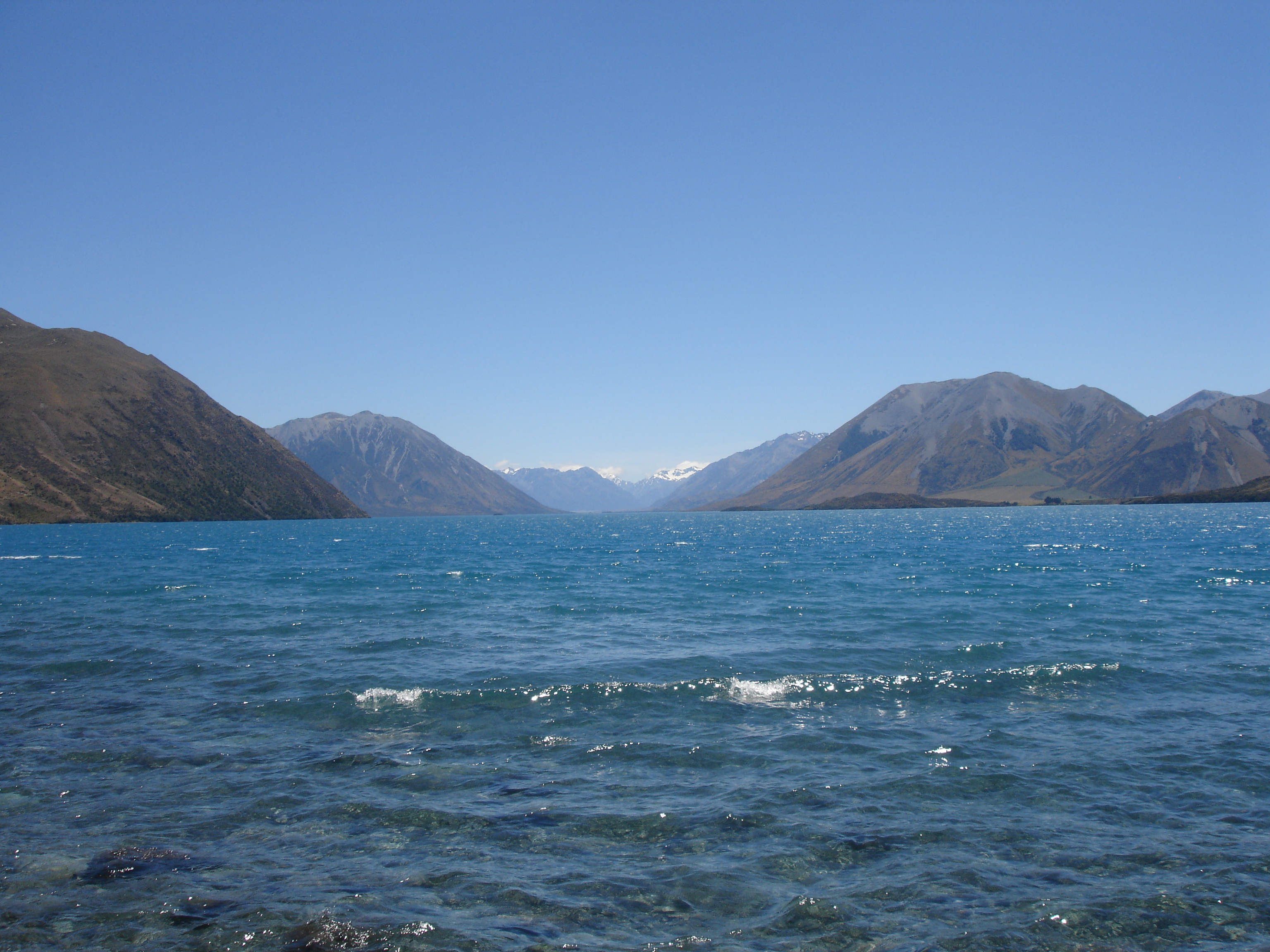
- Lake Coleridge, looking northwest from the southern end

- Location within South Island
- Interactive map of Lake Coleridge
- Location: Selwyn District, Canterbury region, South Island
- Coordinates: 43°17′S 171°30′E
- Primary inflows: Harper, Wilberforce, Acheron
- Primary outflows: Rakaia River (via Coleridge Power Station)
- Basin countries: New Zealand
- Max. length: 11 km (6.8 mi)
- Max. width: 4.8 km (3.0 mi)
- Surface area: 47 km^{2} (18 sq mi)
- Max. depth: 200 m (660 ft)

Lake Coleridge (Māori: Whakamatau) is in inland Canterbury, New Zealand's South Island. It is located 35 kilometres (22 mi) northwest of Methven and has a surface area of 47 square kilometres (18 sq mi). The lake is situated in an over-deepened valley formed by a glacier over 20,000 years ago in the Pleistocene era. It currently has no natural outflows. There is a small settlement at the lake.

== Ecology ==
Early colonial explorers found the shores of the lake covered in mānuka (or kānuka), kōwhai, cabbage trees, flax and general swamp plants. The lake was also surrounded by southern rātā trees and native beech trees. The lake itself was fairly lacking in aquatic plants because of a lack of nutrients. It was known for a population of large eels.

Human activity has significantly changed the ecology. Colonial settlers introduced game fish, including rainbow trout, brown trout, Atlantic salmon and Chinook salmon. Changing water levels caused by the operation of the Coleridge Power Station killed most of the kānuka in 1914 and rata in 1923. In modern times a mixture of native and introduced plants surround the lake, including matagouri, broom, gorse, briar, coprosma and biddi-biddi.

== History ==
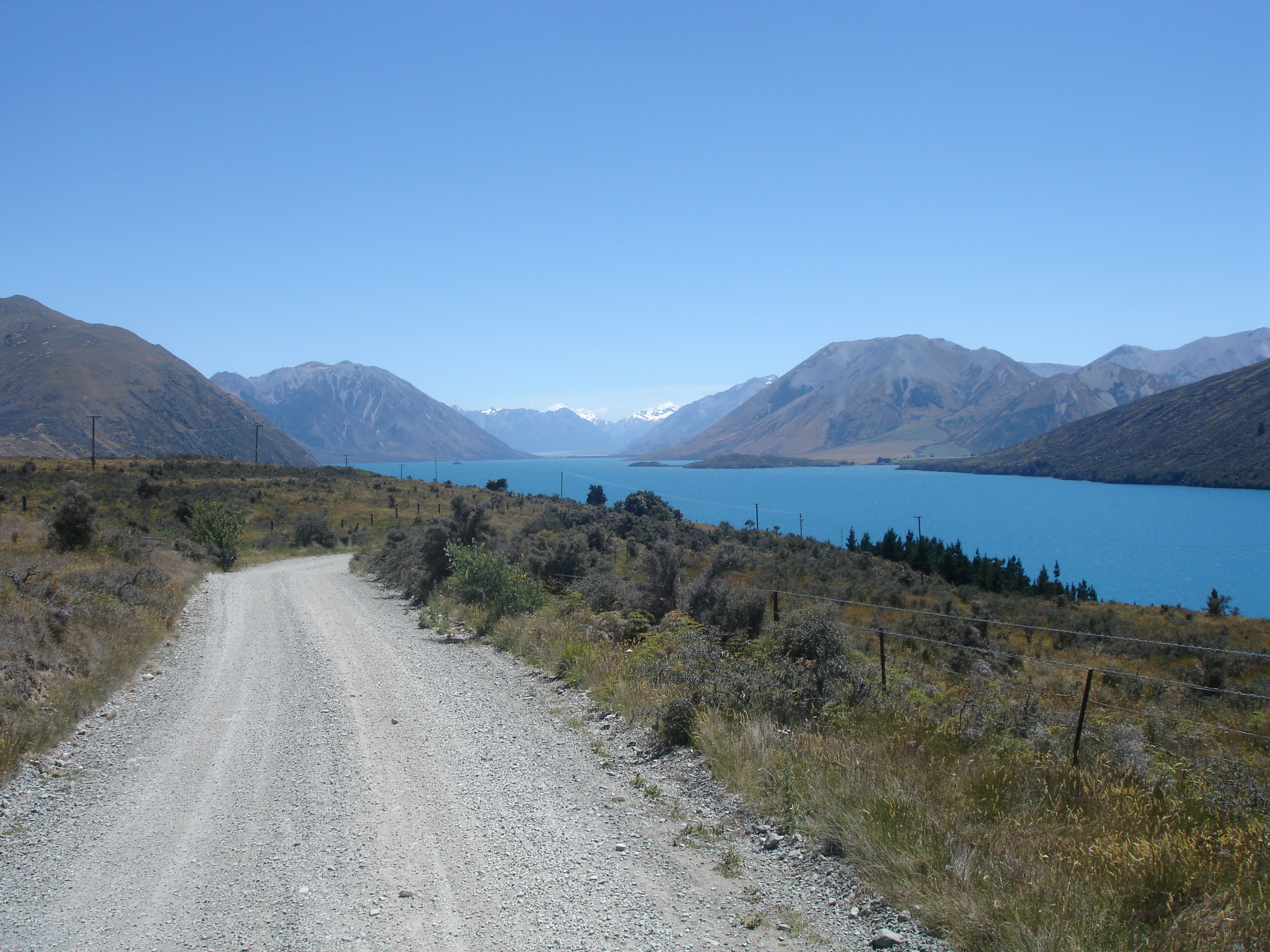
Lake Coleridge pictured from close to the Coleridge Power Station looking north.

=== Pre-history ===
The area of the lake was formed by glacial erosion, probably during the Waimaungan, Waimean and Otiran glaciations. The lake sits close to multiple geological fault-lines, including the Porters Pass Fault, the Cass Fault and the Blue Hill Fault.

=== Māori ===
There is evidence of Māori activity in the area dating back potentially as far as the 13th century. Some nearby archaeological campfires and moa bones were carbon-dated to between 1340 and 1420 AD. Although the area was initially thickly forested, large fires destroyed most of the vegetation between 1200 and 1400. Later, the lake became an important stopping place for coastal tribes making the difficult journey between the east and west coasts to obtain pounamu: the lake’s abundant eels, weka and water fowl could be used to replenish stocks on the long journey.

=== Colonisation and modern times ===
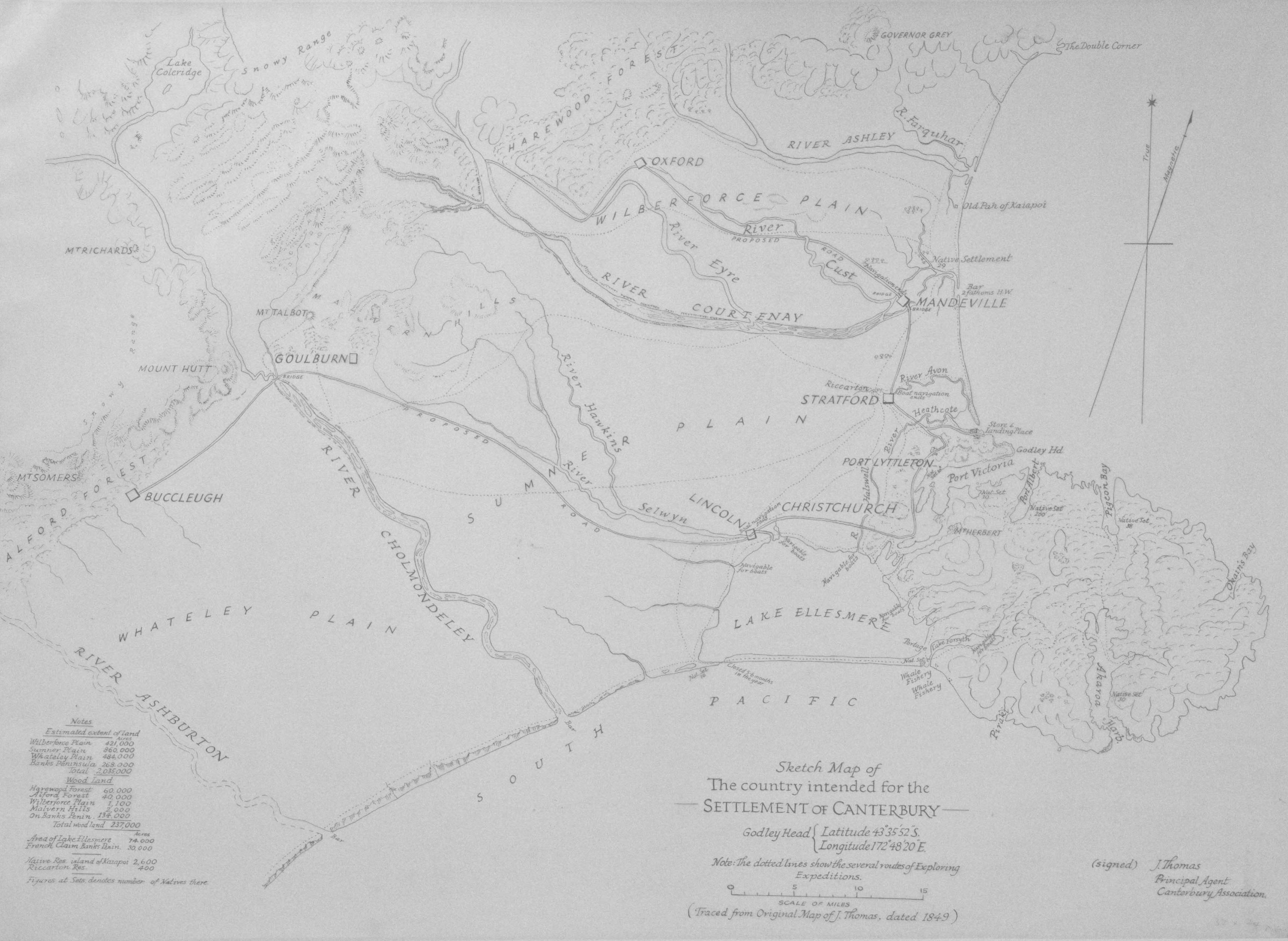
Original map of Canterbury by Joseph Thomas on which he named Lake Coleridge

The lake was named by the chief surveyor of the Canterbury Association, Joseph Thomas, on a sketch map prepared in early 1849. The name commemorates two early members of the Canterbury Association, Edward Coleridge and William Coleridge, who were first cousins and both nephews of Samuel Taylor Coleridge. Two other members of the Coleridge family joined the Canterbury Association in June 1851, after the lake had been named: John Taylor Coleridge (a brother of Edward), and John Coleridge, one of John Taylor's sons.

The lake is the site of one of the country's earliest hydroelectric schemes, the Coleridge Power Station, initially completed in 1914 and built mainly to supply power to Christchurch. The project makes use of the difference in altitude between the lake and river (the lake is 150 metres or 490 feet higher). Both the Harper and Wilberforce rivers have had some of their flow diverted into the lake, with up to 100% of the Harper's flow diverted for the power station. The power station is still operating today.

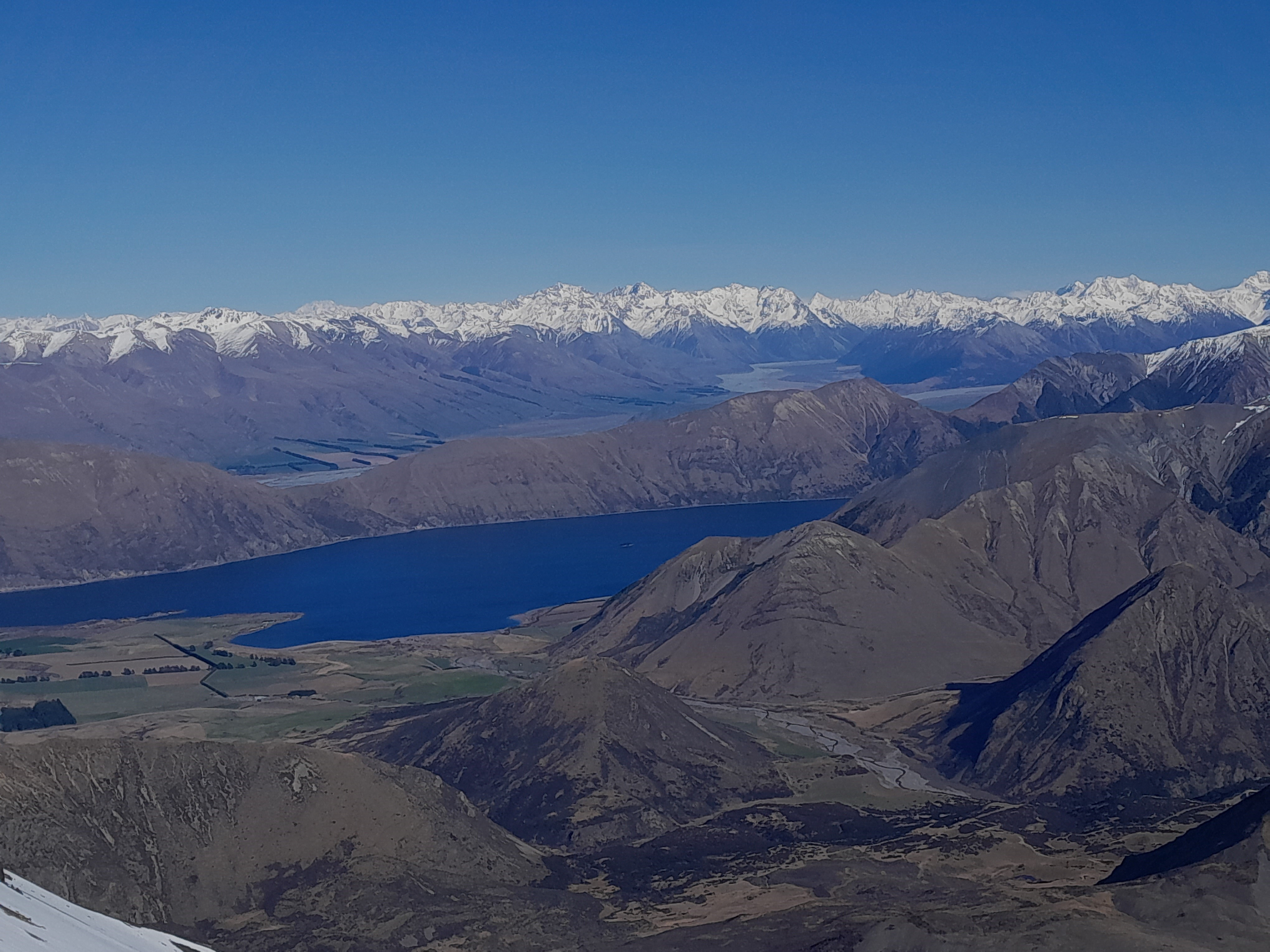
Lake Coleridge seen from Porters Ski Area

The lake was the epicentre of a 6.5 magnitude earthquake that struck on 26 June 1946.

== Climate ==
Climate data for Lake Coleridge, elevation 364 m (1,194 ft), (1981–2010)
Month	Jan	Feb	Mar	Apr	May	Jun	Jul	Aug	Sep	Oct	Nov	Dec	Year
Mean daily maximum °C (°F)	22.4 (72.3)	22.0 (71.6)	20.2 (68.4)	17.3 (63.1)	13.9 (57.0)	10.6 (51.1)	10.0 (50.0)	11.8 (53.2)	14.5 (58.1)	16.2 (61.2)	18.4 (65.1)	20.4 (68.7)	16.5 (61.7)
Daily mean °C (°F)	16.2 (61.2)	15.9 (60.6)	14.2 (57.6)	11.3 (52.3)	8.2 (46.8)	5.5 (41.9)	4.7 (40.5)	6.3 (43.3)	8.7 (47.7)	10.6 (51.1)	12.6 (54.7)	14.5 (58.1)	10.7 (51.3)
Mean daily minimum °C (°F)	10.0 (50.0)	9.7 (49.5)	8.1 (46.6)	5.3 (41.5)	2.5 (36.5)	0.3 (32.5)	−0.6 (30.9)	0.7 (33.3)	2.9 (37.2)	5.0 (41.0)	6.7 (44.1)	8.6 (47.5)	4.9 (40.9)
Average rainfall mm (inches)	57.1 (2.25)	37.4 (1.47)	60.1 (2.37)	67.1 (2.64)	55.7 (2.19)	74.7 (2.94)	80.2 (3.16)	97.8 (3.85)	90.5 (3.56)	80.4 (3.17)	66.5 (2.62)	56.4 (2.22)	823.9 (32.44)
Source: NIWA (rain 1991–2020)

Climate data for Harper River, elevation 533 m (1,749 ft), (1991–2020)
Month	Jan	Feb	Mar	Apr	May	Jun	Jul	Aug	Sep	Oct	Nov	Dec	Year
Mean daily maximum °C (°F)	21.2 (70.2)	21.7 (71.1)	19.0 (66.2)	16.0 (60.8)	13.2 (55.8)	9.9 (49.8)	9.3 (48.7)	10.8 (51.4)	12.9 (55.2)	14.9 (58.8)	16.6 (61.9)	19.3 (66.7)	15.4 (59.7)
Daily mean °C (°F)	15.4 (59.7)	15.5 (59.9)	13.2 (55.8)	10.5 (50.9)	8.2 (46.8)	5.2 (41.4)	4.4 (39.9)	5.8 (42.4)	7.8 (46.0)	9.6 (49.3)	11.3 (52.3)	13.7 (56.7)	10.0 (50.1)
Mean daily minimum °C (°F)	9.6 (49.3)	9.3 (48.7)	7.5 (45.5)	5.1 (41.2)	3.2 (37.8)	0.6 (33.1)	−0.6 (30.9)	0.8 (33.4)	2.7 (36.9)	4.3 (39.7)	6.0 (42.8)	8.1 (46.6)	4.7 (40.5)
Average rainfall mm (inches)	89.1 (3.51)	54.7 (2.15)	90.4 (3.56)	77.2 (3.04)	91.5 (3.60)	136.9 (5.39)	86.0 (3.39)	130.5 (5.14)	119.7 (4.71)	126.3 (4.97)	125.6 (4.94)	92.9 (3.66)	1,220.8 (48.06)
Source: NIWA

== See also ==
- Lakes of New Zealand
- List of lakes of New Zealand
