= Mangapapa River (Bay of Plenty) =

River in New Zealand

- Route of the Mangapapa River
- Mouth of the Mangapapa River Mangapapa River (Bay of Plenty) (North Island)

Location
- Country: New Zealand

Physical characteristics
- Source: Kaimai Range
  - coordinates: 38°00′32″S 176°03′21″E
- Mouth
  - location: Lake McLaren
  - coordinates: 37°49′13″S 176°02′22″E
  - elevation: 81 m (266 ft)
- Length: 25 km (16 mi)

Basin features
- Progression: Mangapapa River → Opuiaki River → Wairoa River → Tauranga Harbour → Bay of Plenty → Pacific Ocean

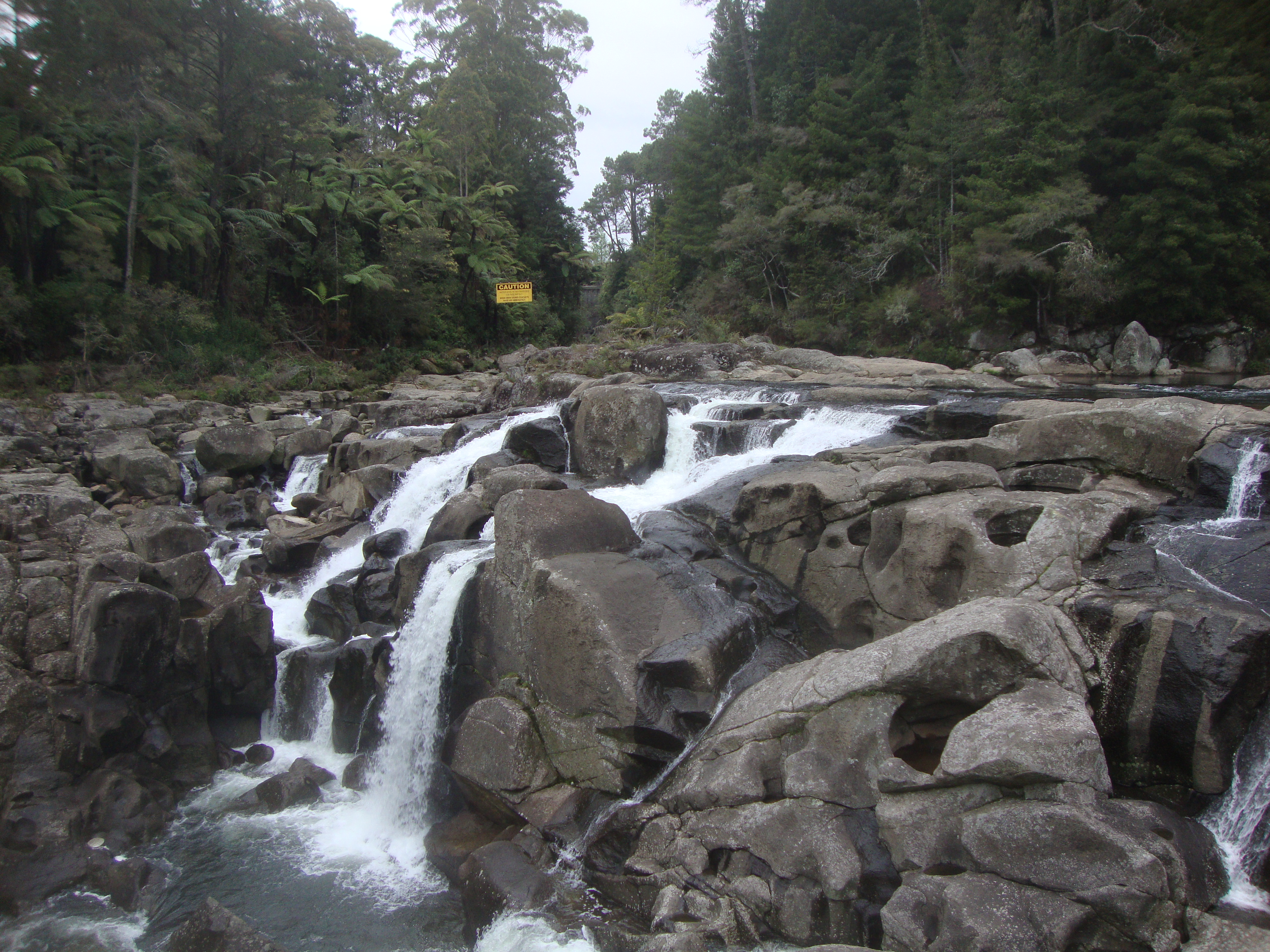
Opuiaki River at McLaren Falls, at the confluence with the Mangakarengorengo River

The Mangapapa River is a river of the Bay of Plenty Region of New Zealand's North Island. It rises on the north slopes of the Mamaku Plateau at the southern end of the Kaimai Range and meets the Opuiaki River at the head of Lake McLaren, which discharges to the Wairoa River a short distance downstream from the lake at the confluence with the Mangakarengorengo River.

The river has been modified as part of the Kaimai hydro power scheme. The 15.6 MW Lloyd Mandeno Power Station is on the left bank of the river and discharges water diverted from other nearby streams. About 4 kilometres (2.5 mi) below this is a concrete arch dam with the 6.25 MW Lower Mangapapa Power Station.

== See also ==
- List of rivers of New Zealand
