= Ngāti Hinerangi =

Coordinates: 37.8213°S 175.7664°E

- Iwi (tribe) in Māoridom
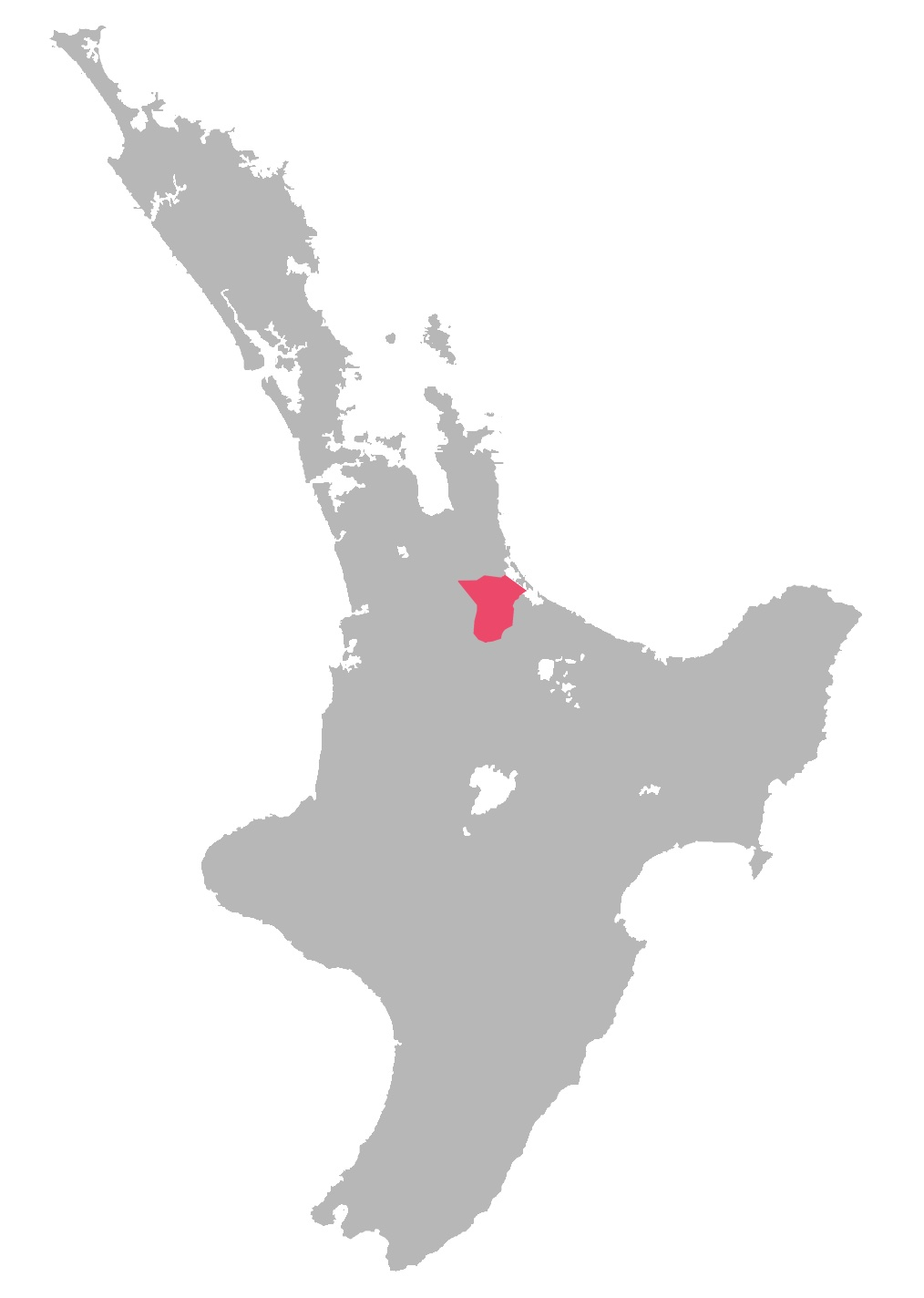
- Ngāti Hinerangi area of interest
- Rohe (region): Eastern Waikato and northern Bay of Plenty
- Waka (canoe): Tainui
- Website: www.ngatihinerangiiwi.co.nz/oursettlementAIP

Ngāti Hinerangi is a Māori iwi of New Zealand, based in Matamata, with 4 marae (Hinerangi Tawhaki, Te Ohaki, Tangata and Tamapango) at Okauia. As well as Matamata, Te Rohe o Kōperu (Ngāti Hinerangi area of interest) includes Te Tapui (a hill west of Matamata), Peria, Puketutu (near Kiwitahi), the Kaimai Range, Tanners Point, Rereatukahia, Aongatete, Apata, Te Paeoturawaru, Pahoia, Ōmokoroa, Huharua, Motuhoa Island, the inner reaches of Tauranga harbour, Pukehou on the Wairoa River, Haukapa, Ngāumuwahine, Whenua-a-kura and Hinuera. A 2021 Treaty Settlement gave $8.1m, returned 14 sites of cultural significance and apologised for confiscation of 100,000 ha (250,000 acres) in Tauranga in 1863 and for the invasion of villages in 1867, the 'bush campaign', when government forces destroyed the crops and homes of those opposing surveys of the confiscated area, to the south-west of Tauranga.

== History ==
Ngāti Hinerangi iwi and hapu descend from Hoturoa, leader of the Tainui canoe, via the ancestors, Whatihua and Rua-pū-tahanga, and the following generations, Uenukuterangihoka, Tamapango and Kōperu. Kōperu, the founding ancestor of Ngati Hinerangi and 10th generation descendant of Hoturoa, fought Ngā Marama to take their lands in Tauranga and Matamata. His grandsons Tokotoko, Te Riha and Tangata completed the conquest, with help from Ngāti Rangi and Ngāti Tāwhaki who were closely related to Ngāti Hinerangi. They combined together again to confront European colonisation.

== See also ==
- List of Māori iwi
