= Mangapapa River =

Mangapapa River may refer to:

- Mangapapa River (Bay of Plenty) - a river of the western Bay of Plenty Region of New Zealand's North Island
- Mangapapa River (Manawatu-Wanganui) - a river of the Manawatu-Wanganui Region of New Zealand's North Island

== See also ==
- Mangapapa for the suburb of Gisborne, New Zealand.
- Manganui River (disambiguation)
- Mangaone River (disambiguation)
