= Ngāumuwahine River =

- Route of the Ngāumuwahine River
- Mouth of the Ngāumuwahine River Ngāumuwahine River (North Island)

Location
- Country: New Zealand

Physical characteristics
- Source: Kaimai Range
  - coordinates: 37°47′17″S 175°54′25″E
- Mouth
  - location: Mangakarengorengo River
  - coordinates: 37°49′06″S 176°01′02″E
- Length: 25 km (16 mi)

Basin features
- Progression: Ngāumuwahine River → Mangakarengorengo River → Opuiaki River → Wairoa River → Tauranga Harbour → Bay of Plenty → Pacific Ocean
- Tributaries
  - right: Mangaputa Stream, Mangatotara Stream

The Ngāumuwahine River, formerly known as the Ngamuwahine River, is a river of the Bay of Plenty Region of New Zealand's North Island. It flows initially north from its source in the Kaimai Range before turning southeast to meet the Mangakarengorengo River 19 kilometres (12 mi) southwest of Tauranga.

Following the passage of the Ngā Hapū o Ngāti Ranginui Treaty Claims Settlement Act 2025, the name of the river officially became the Ngāumuwahine River.

== See also ==
- List of rivers of New Zealand
