= Opuiaki River =

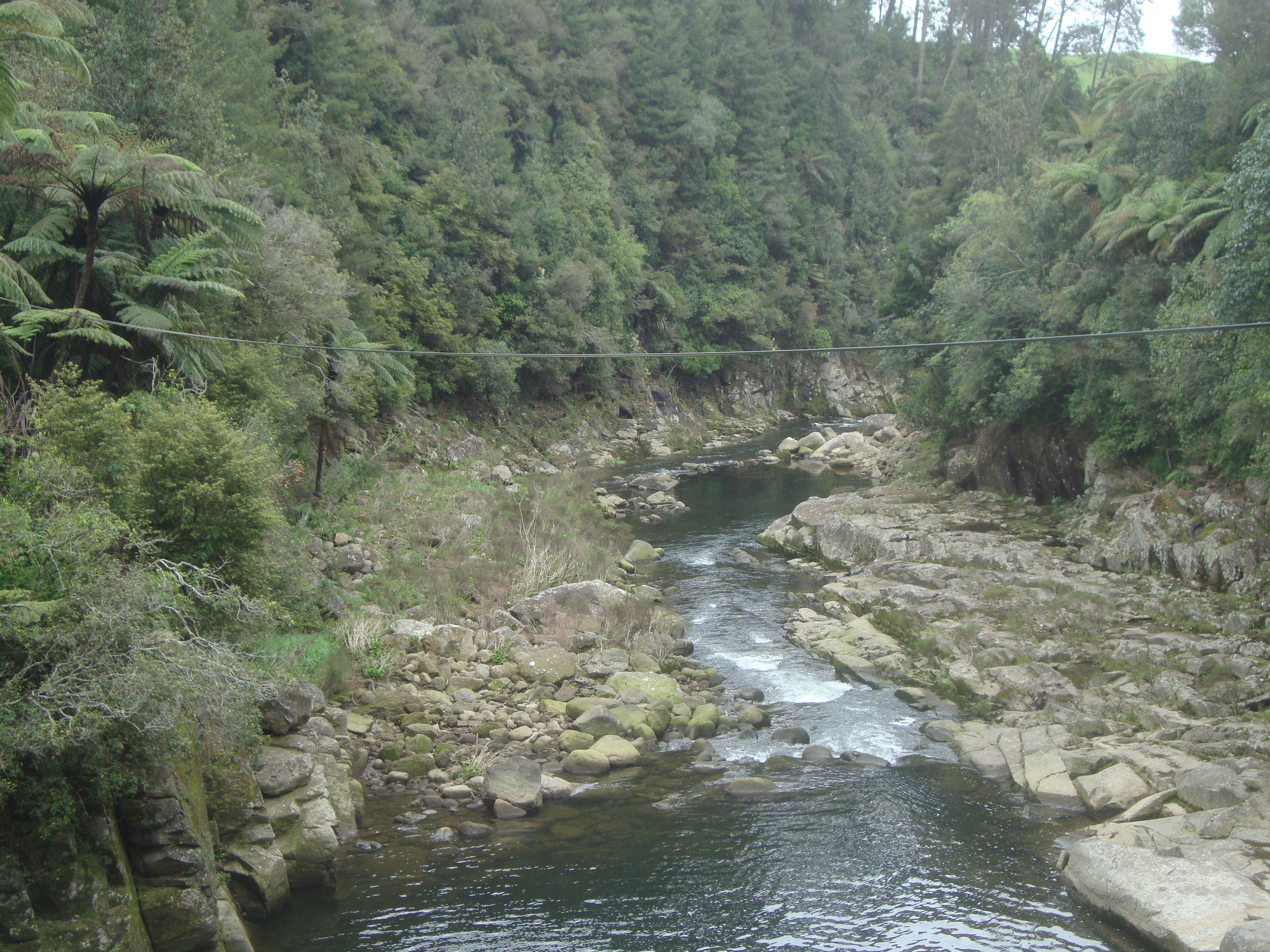
- Opuiaki River seen from the McLaren Falls power station
- Route of the Opuiaki River
- Mouth of the Opuiaki River Opuiaki River (North Island)

Location
- Country: New Zealand

Physical characteristics
- Source: Mamaku Plateau
  - coordinates: 37°56′41″S 175°56′42″E
- Mouth
  - location: Wairoa River
  - coordinates: 37°46′58″S 176°03′07″E
- Length: 24 km (15 mi)

Basin features
- Progression: Opuiaki River → Wairoa River → Tauranga Harbour → Bay of Plenty → Pacific Ocean
- Tributaries
  - left: Mangaroa Stream, Mangapapa River, Mangakarengorengo River
  - right: Waipapa Stream, Waiwhakarewarewa Stream, Waiwhakangau Stream, Ngatuhoa Stream, Mangaonui Stream
- Waterfalls: Te Rereioturu Falls, McLaren Falls
- Bridges: McLaren Falls Road Bridge

The Opuiaki River is a river of the Bay of Plenty Region of New Zealand's North Island. It flows north from the Mamaku Plateau into Lake McLaren, to reach the Wairoa River 15 kilometres (9 mi) southwest of Tauranga.

== Geography ==
Te Rere I Oturu Falls are on the Opuiaki River, with the coordinates of 37° 55' 34.89" S 175° 59' 55.38" E. The name is based on a legend about a member of the Ngāti Ranginui tribe. His name was Oturu and while being pursued by members of his tribe, he jumped from the falls. The falls are about 25 metres (82 ft) wide and 40 metres (130 ft) high. The Opuiaki river is mainly rain-fed and the flow can change rapidly during and immediately after a downpour. The falls can be reached via hiking tracks starting at the Ngatuhoa Lodge. A gravel forestry road runs past at some distance, from where a hiking track leads to the falls. The river runs through, and is part of, the Opuiaki Ecological Area, created for the protection of native flora and fauna. The Department of Conservation (DOC) carries out pest control and breeding programs, including for the kōkako, an endangered native bird species.

== History ==
The river contributes to the Kaimai hydro power scheme built in the 1980s. A dam was built uphill from where the Ngatuhoa Lodge is now. From the dam a tunnel was dug, which channels the water into the Ngatuhoa Stream, where it enters just above another dam built there. Provisions are made to maintain some flow in both streams. Digging the tunnel was a challenging operation due to the geology of the area, formed by volcanic activity from various volcanoes, with clay and other sediment in between. Artesian waters also flow between the layers of rock and contribute to the flow of the streams in the area.

== Whitewater recreation ==
Every year in February the upper section of the river is home to a kayak extreme whitewater race. The first day is a sprint down to bottom of The Waterfall. The second day is head to head racing down the Grade V Waterfall and Rollercoaster.

The whitewater starts at McLaren Falls, a seven-metre Grade VI waterfall (usually not paddled). The first one-metre drop is called "Humpty Dumpty", often used as a warm-up. The first major rapid is "Mother's Nightmare" - a long Grade IV rapid finishing with a 2-metre drop. Then follow the few grade III rapids (Helicopter, Double Trouble & Devils Elbow/Washing Machine). Then comes the two Grade V sections, "Top Waterfall" (a small drop into a hole followed by a three-metre drop) and Roller Coaster. After that there is a Grade III rock garden, a Whitewater Slalom gorge and few short grade III rapids leading up to the grade III "Bottom Waterfall" (another two metre drop).

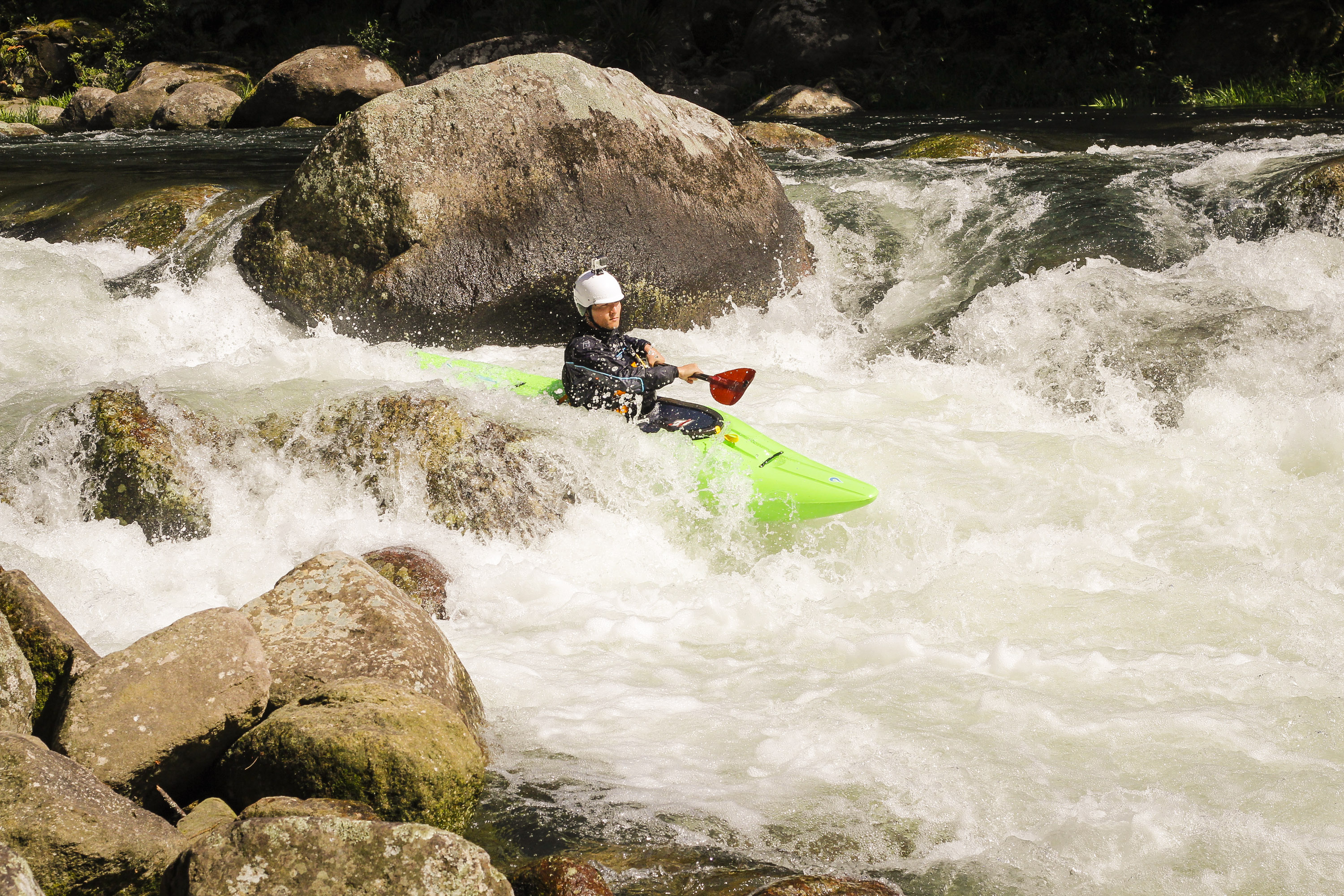
Mother's Nightmare entry

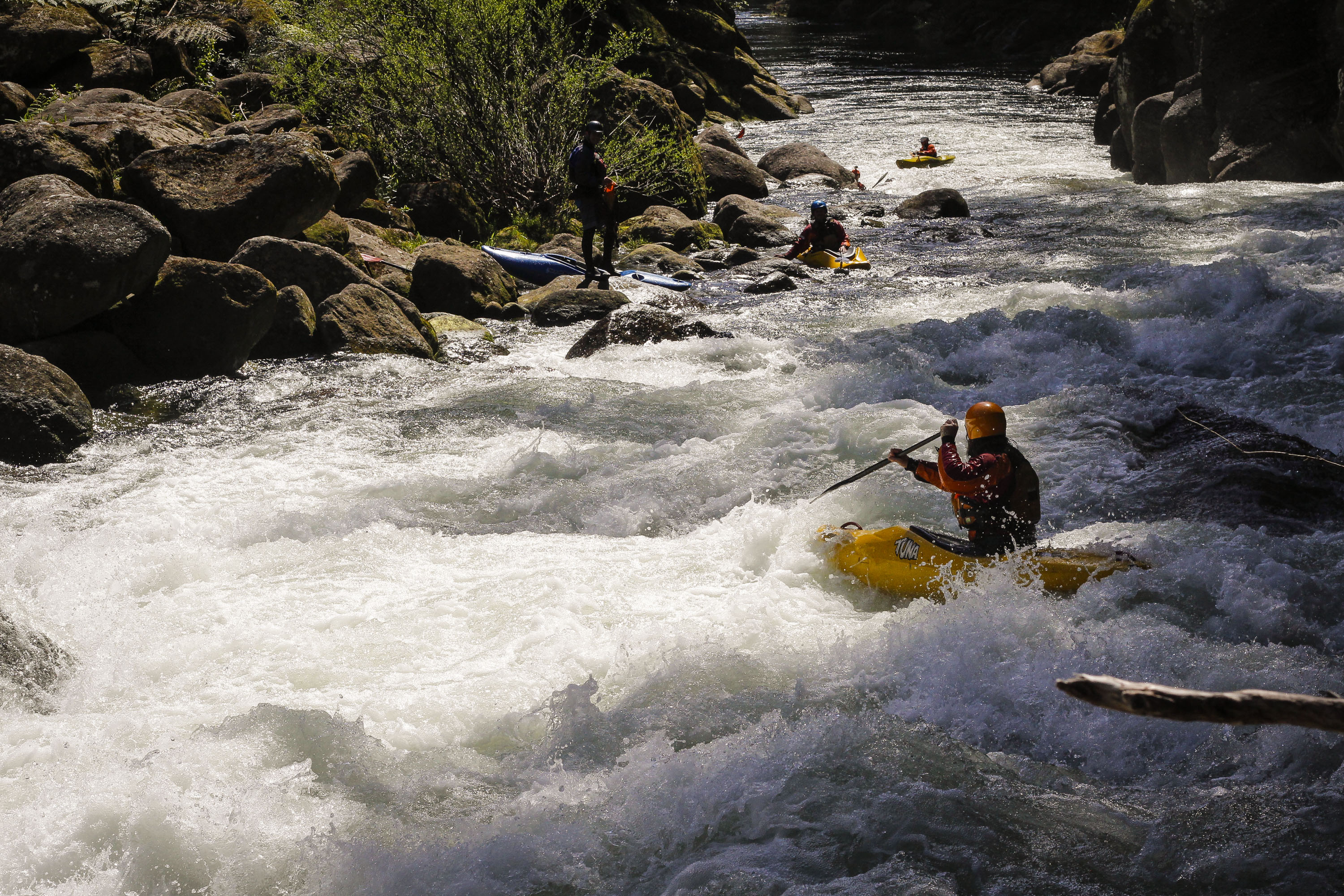
Mother's Nightmare

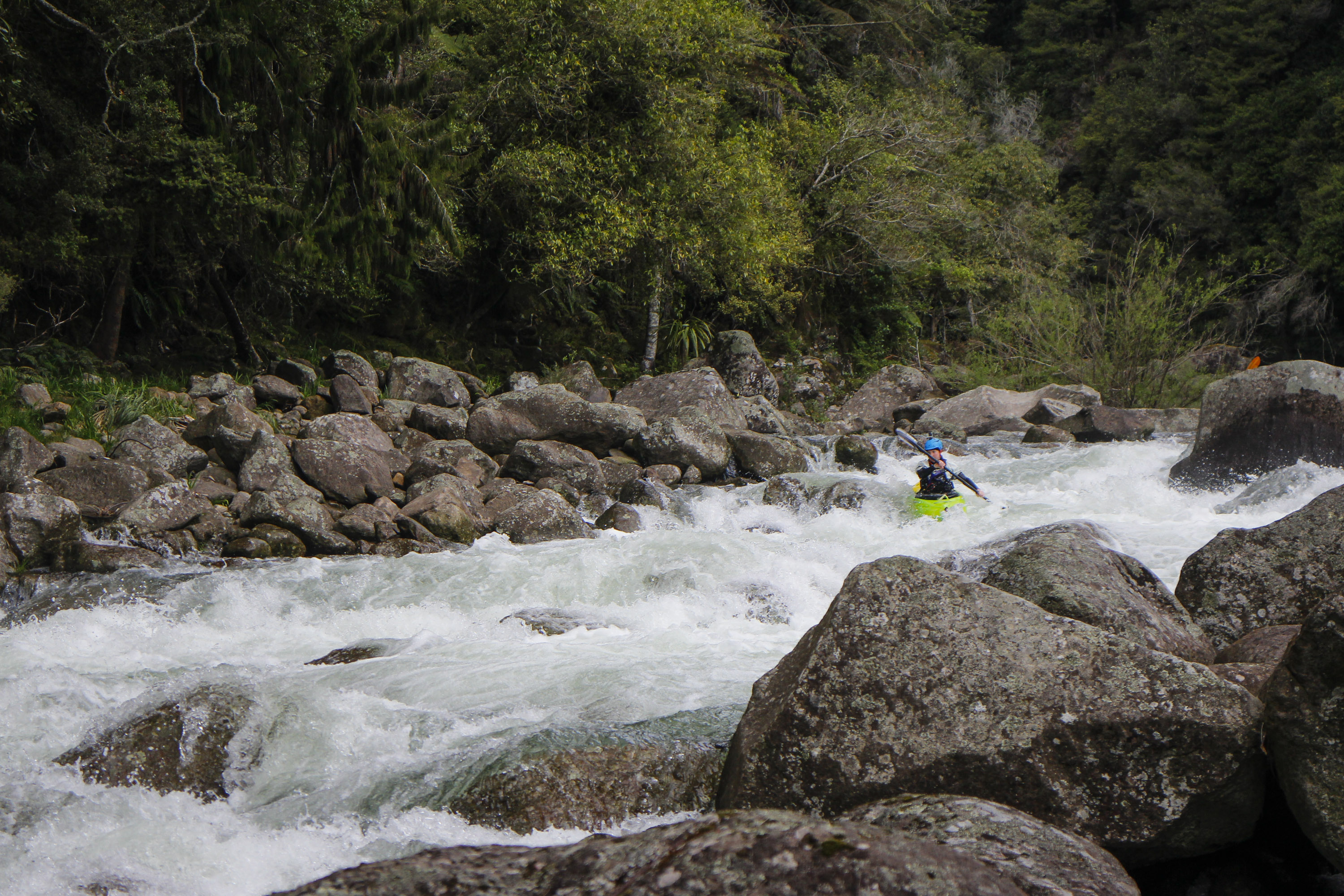
Mother's Nightmare (looking upstream)

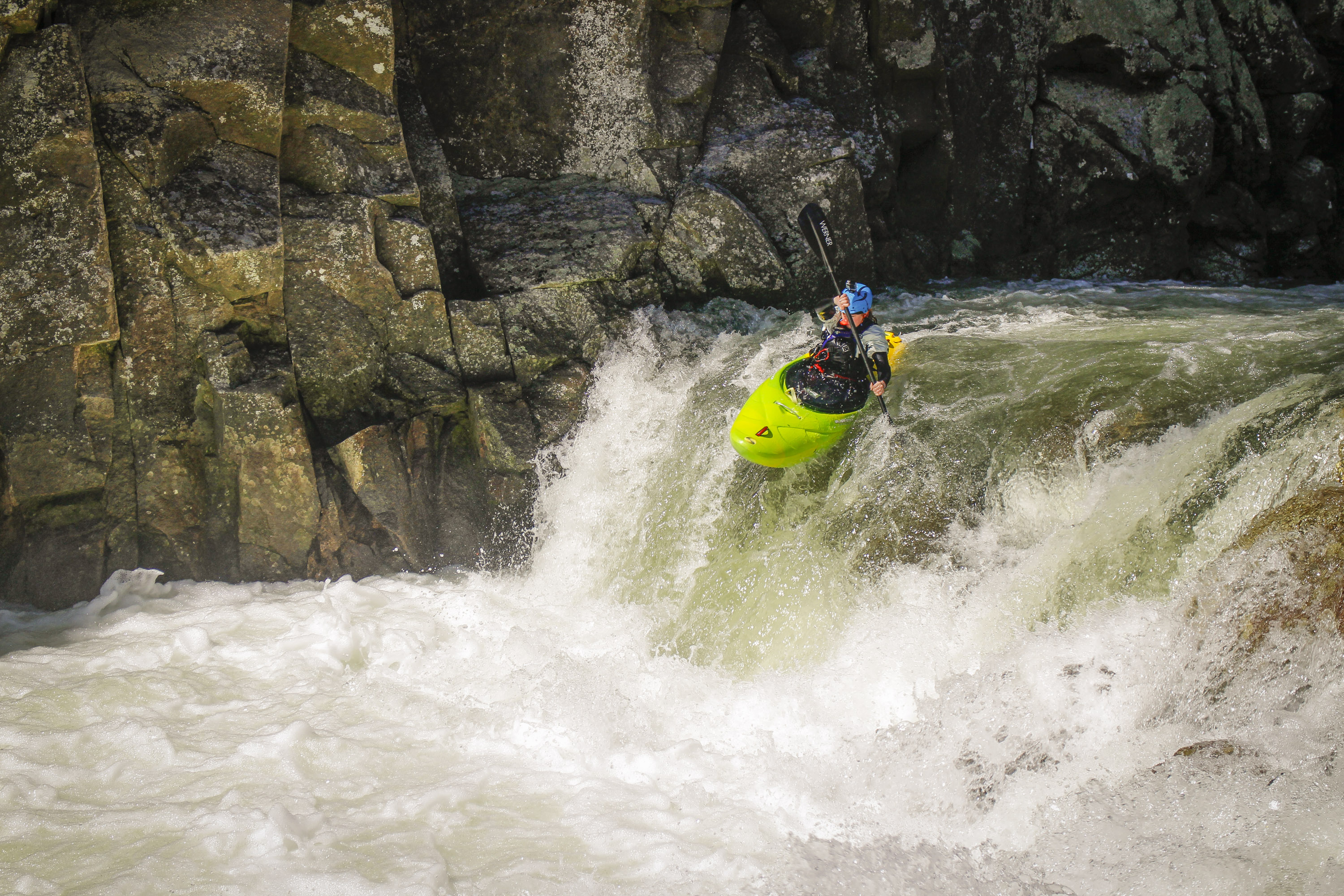
Mother's nightmare drop

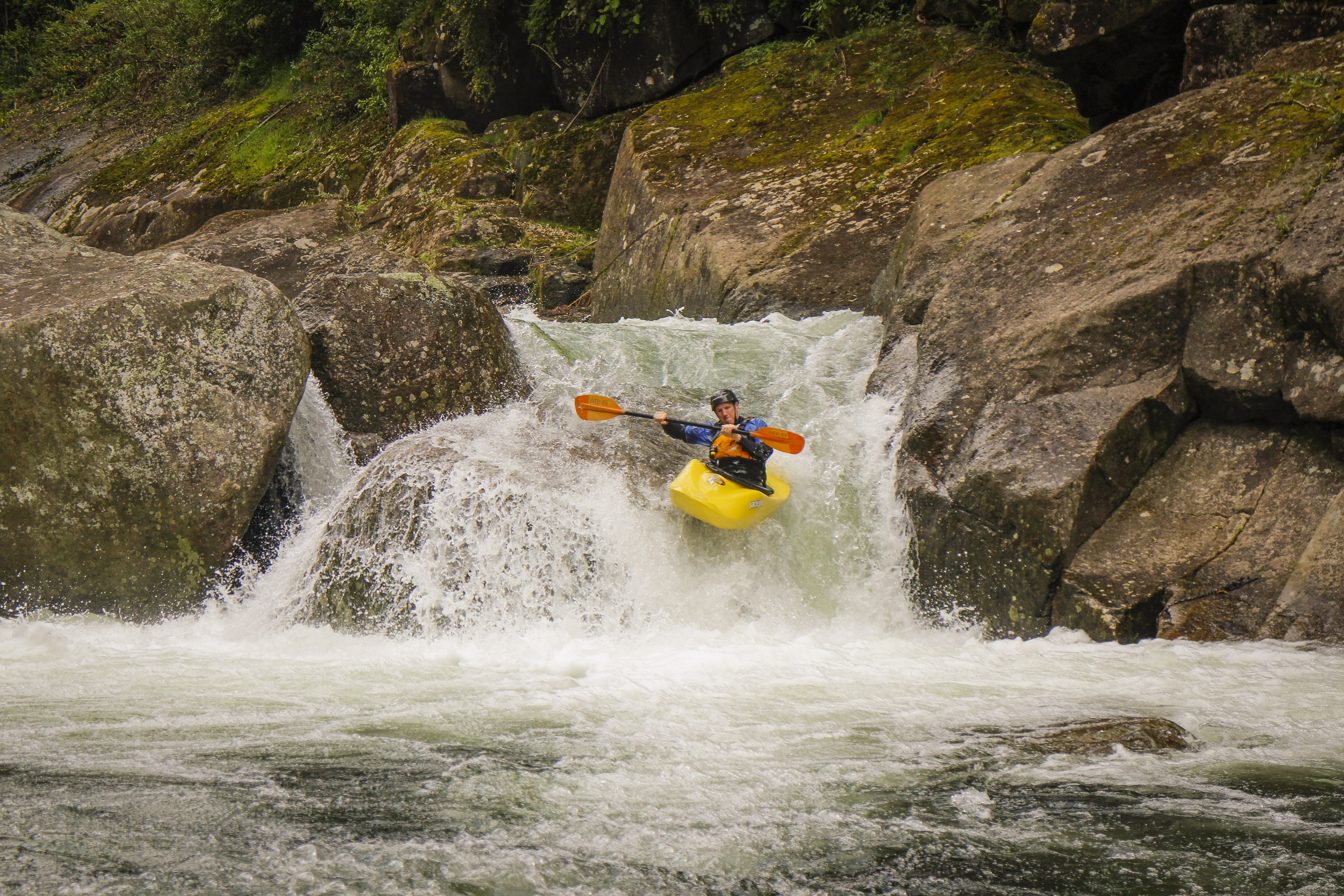
Top Waterfall

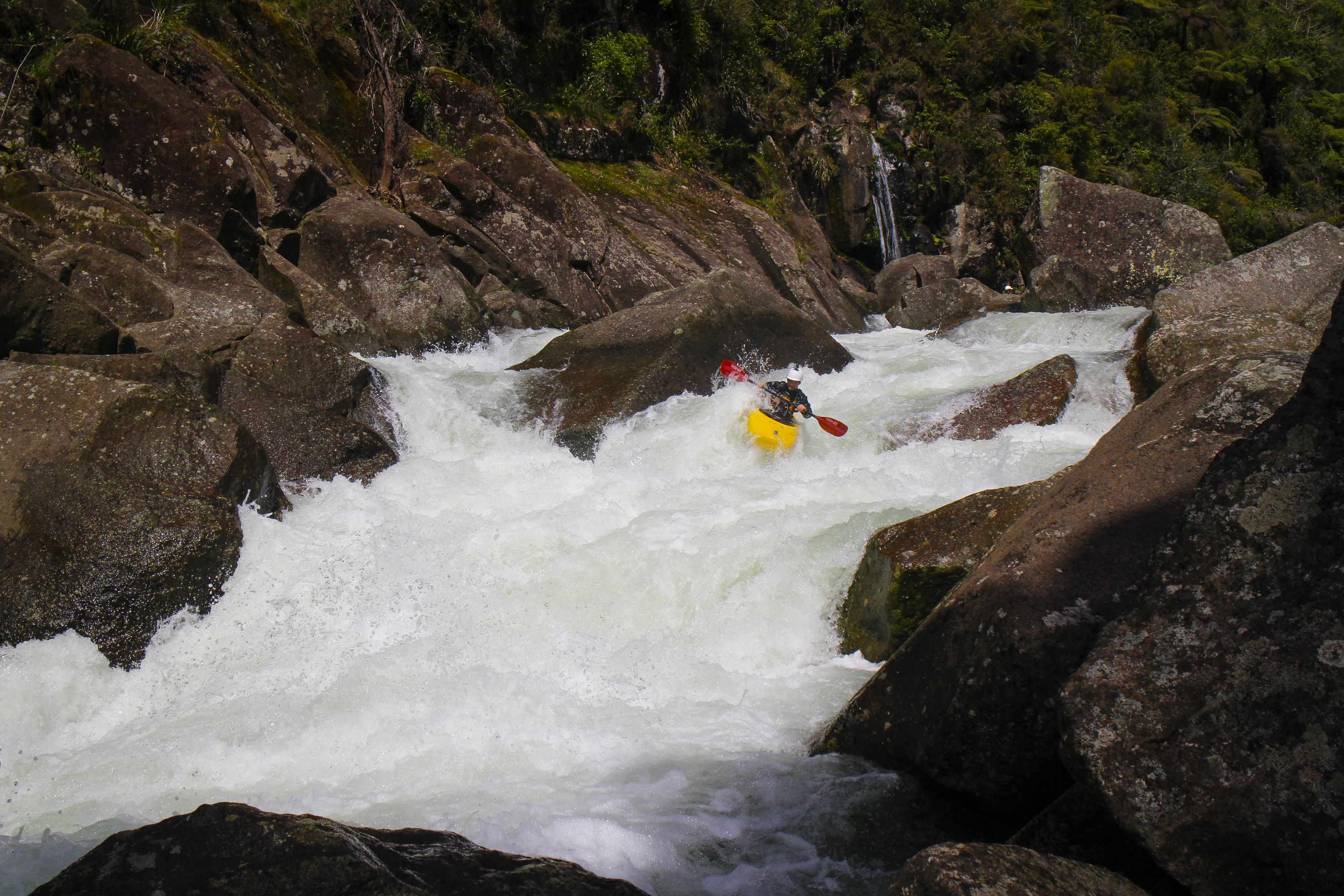
Rollercoaster Rapid

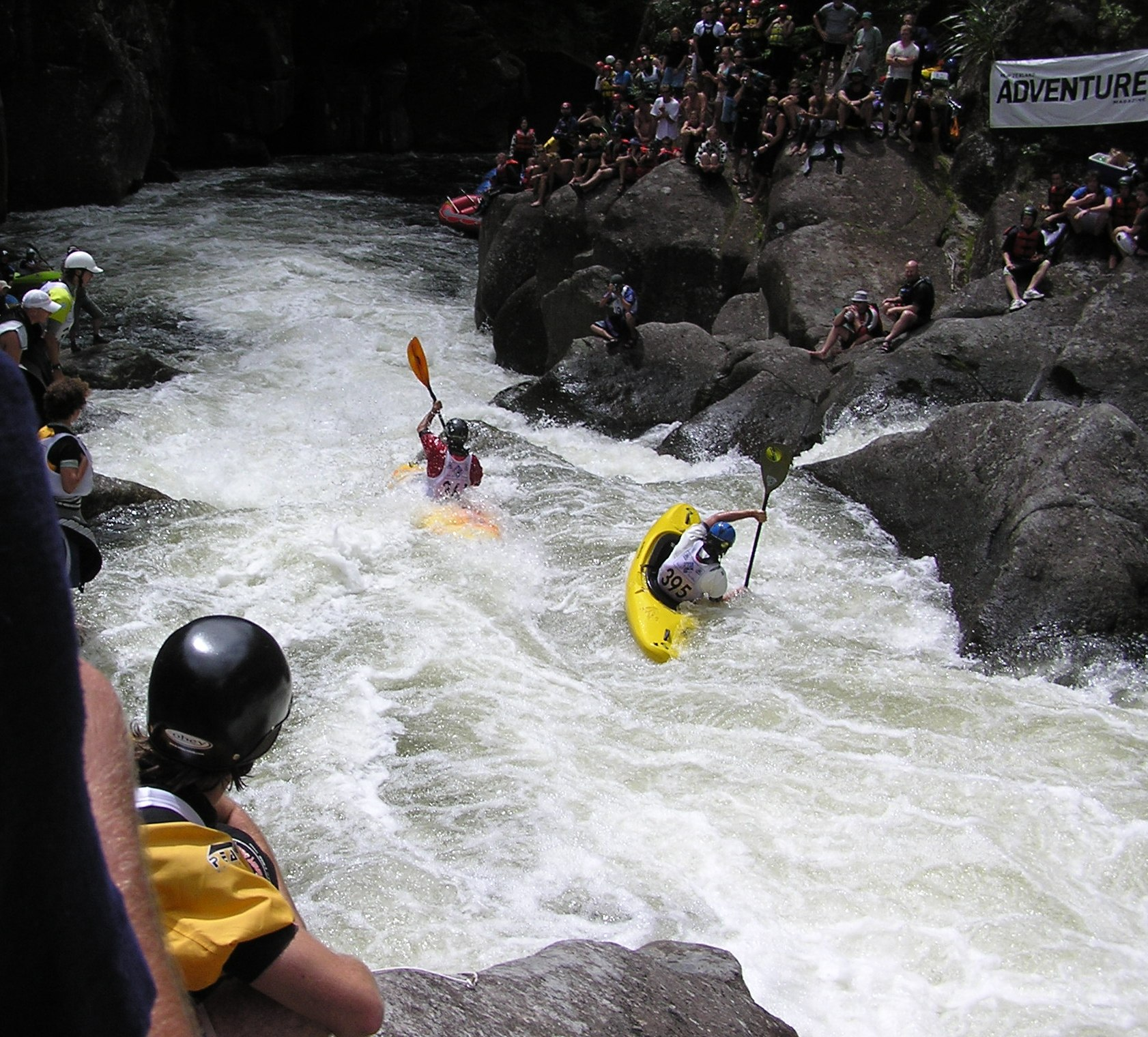
Roller Coaster, Wairoa River, Bay of Plenty

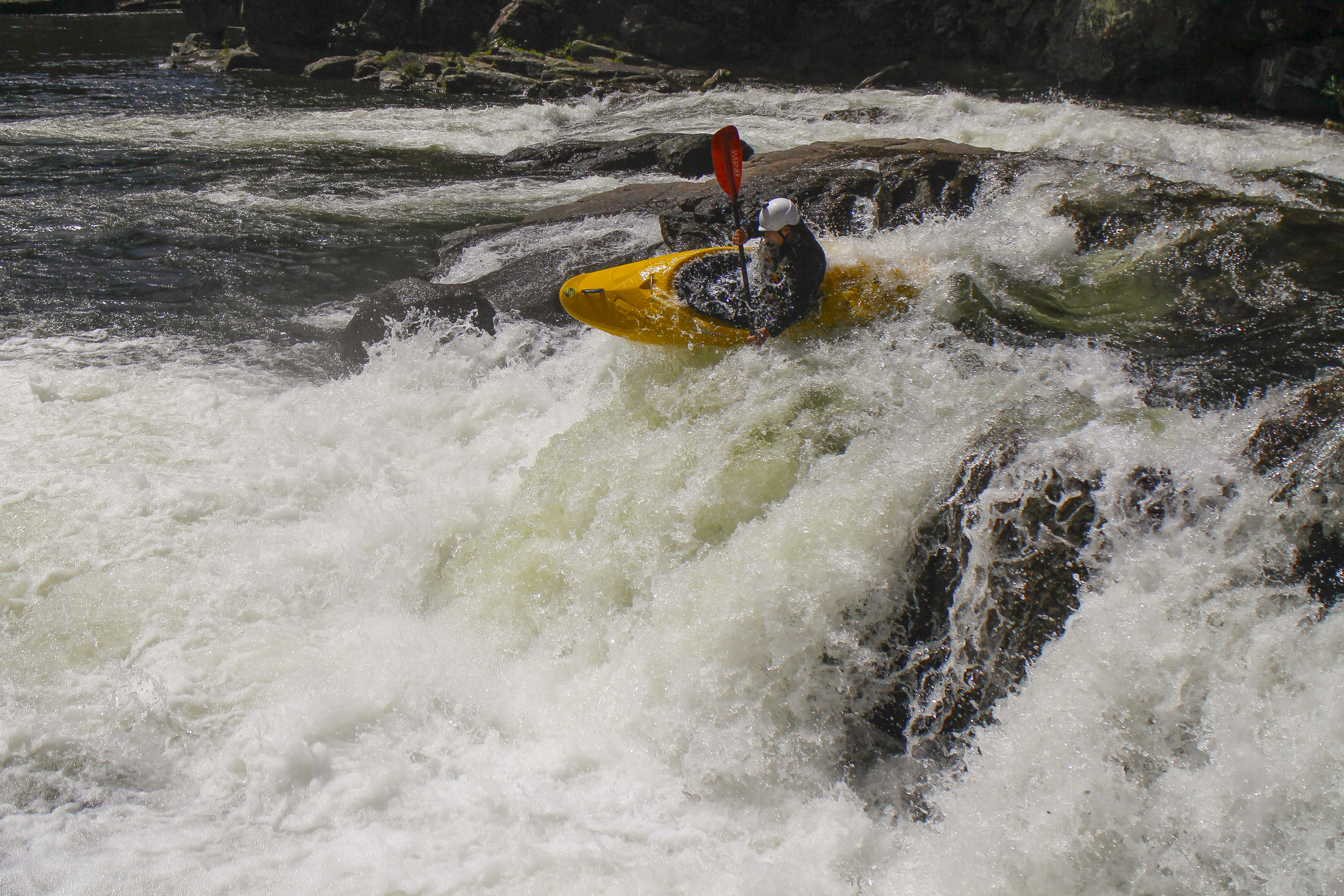
Bottom Waterfall

== See also ==
- List of rivers of New Zealand
- List of waterfalls of New Zealand
