= Mangaone River =

Mangaone River may refer to:

- Mangaone River (Hawke's Bay), a river of the Hawke's Bay Region of New Zealand
- Mangaone River (Manawatu-Wanganui), a river of the south of New Zealand's North Island

== See also ==
- Manganui River (disambiguation)
- Mangapapa River (disambiguation)
