= Okauia =

Settlement in Waikato, New Zealand

- Interactive map of Okauia
- Coordinates: 37.788390°S 175.838420°E
- Country: New Zealand
- Region: Waikato
- Territorial authority: Matamata-Piako District
- Ward: Matamata General Ward
- Electorates: Waikato; Hauraki-Waikato (Māori)

Government
  - Territorial Authority: Matamata-Piako District Council
  - Regional council: Waikato Regional Council
  - Mayor of Matamata-Piako: Ash Tanner
  - Waikato MP: Tim van de Molen
  - Hauraki-Waikato MP: Hana-Rawhiti Maipi-Clarke

Area
  - Total: 54.48 km^{2} (21.03 sq mi)

Population (2023 Census)
  - Total: 342
  - Density: 6.28/km^{2} (16.3/sq mi)
- Time zone: UTC+12 (NZST)
  - Summer (DST): UTC+13 (NZDT)
- Postcode: 3401
- Area code: 07

Okauia is a rural settlement and community located east of Matamata, in the Waikato region of New Zealand's North Island.

The New Zealand Ministry for Culture and Heritage gives a translation of "place of articles threaded on a stick" for Ōkauia.

There are hot springs on both banks of the Waihou River. Opal is on the west bank and Crystal, or Chrystal, on the east.

Wairere Falls, the highest waterfall in the North Island, is northeast of Okauia.

== Marae ==
The area includes three marae affiliated with the Ngāti Hinerangi iwi:

- Hinerangi Tawhaki Marae is affiliated with the hapū of Ngāti Rangi, Ngāti Tamapango, Ngāti Tawhaki and Uri o Tangata.
- Tamapango Marae is affiliated with the hapū of Ngāti Rangi, Ngāti Tamapango and Ngāti Tawhaki.
- Te Ōhākī Marae is affiliated with the hapū of Ngāti Kura, Ngāti Te Riha, Ngāti Tokotoko and Ngāti Whakamaungarangi.

Another local marae, Tangata Marae, is affiliated with the Ngāti Raukawa iwi and its Ngāti Hinerangi hapū. In October 2020, the Government committed $1,259,392 from the Provincial Growth Fund to upgrade Tangata Marae and 7 other Ngāti Raukawa marae, creating 18 jobs.

== History ==
In 1879 about 30,000 acres (12,000 ha) at Okauia was divided, largely to F A Whittaker and Josiah Firth. In 1896 the government bought the 6,528 acres (2,642 ha) Okauia section of Firth's Matamata estate, under the Land for Settlements Acts, and started selling it to settlers in 1898. However, it wasn't until 1911 that most of the land was taken up and the Okauia scheme was reported as a success. The hot springs were not part of the sales.

A post office opened in 1906.

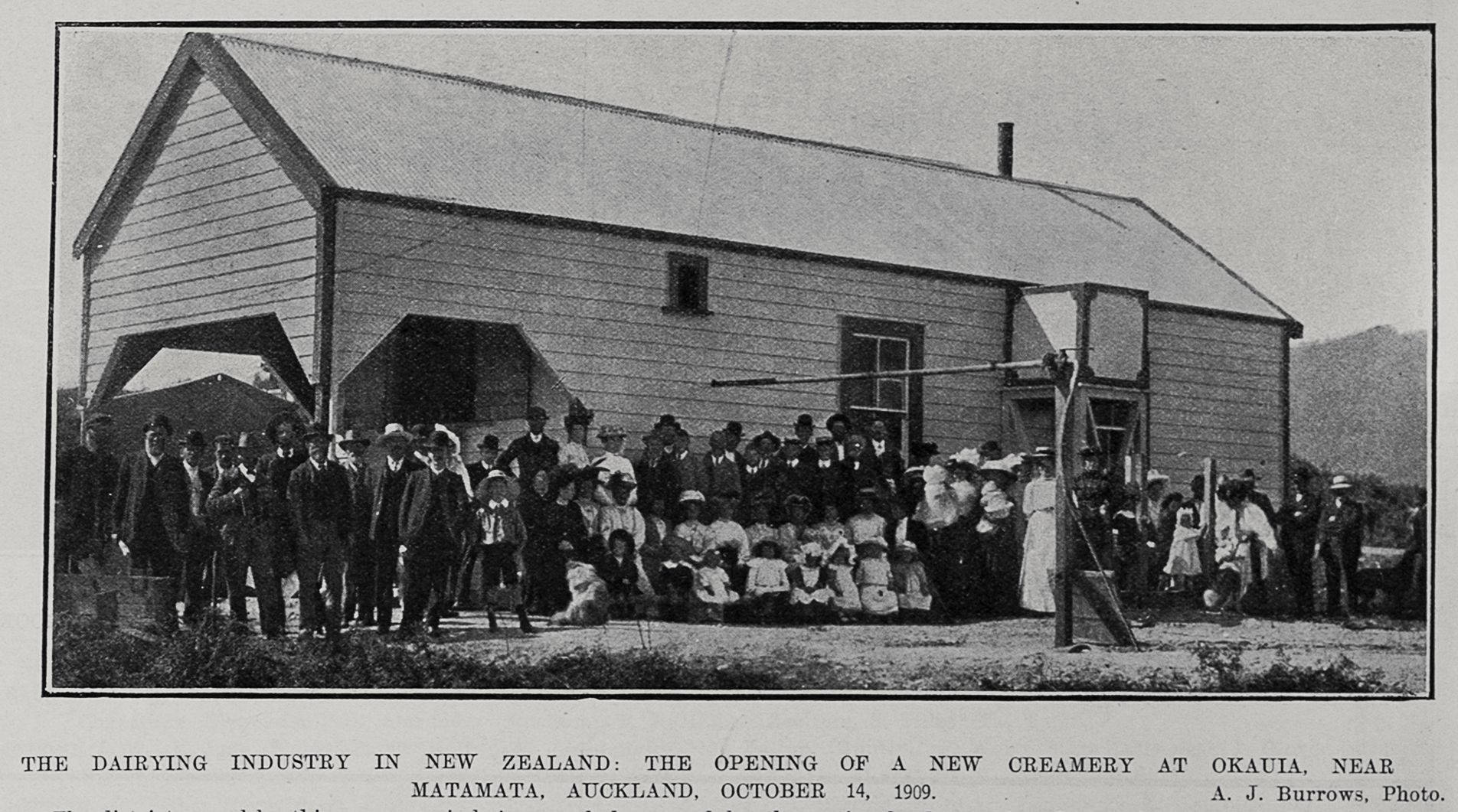
Okauia Creamery in 1909

A school, at the east end of Okauia Springs Road opened early in 1909. In 1924 there were 34 pupils and 2 teachers. and closed between 1936 and 1945. From 1925 standards 5 and 6 pupils went to Matamata Junior High School. In 1939 a 2-room Native school opened, at the end of Douglas Road, using the Okauia school building. That school closed in 1968 and the building was moved to Walton School. The Okauia Hall, opened in 1961, was built on the site of the old Okauia School horse paddock.

A creamery opened in October 1909, to the east, on Old Te Aroha Road. It closed in 1915.

In 1919 plans were made for a residential development, where the 18-hole, 100 acres (40 ha) golf course (opened in 1935) now is.

The Thames Valley Electric Power Board extended their lines to Okauia in 1923.

A hall opened in 1928, to the south, on Barton Road. It was replaced by the present hall, about a kilometre east of the springs, around 1951.

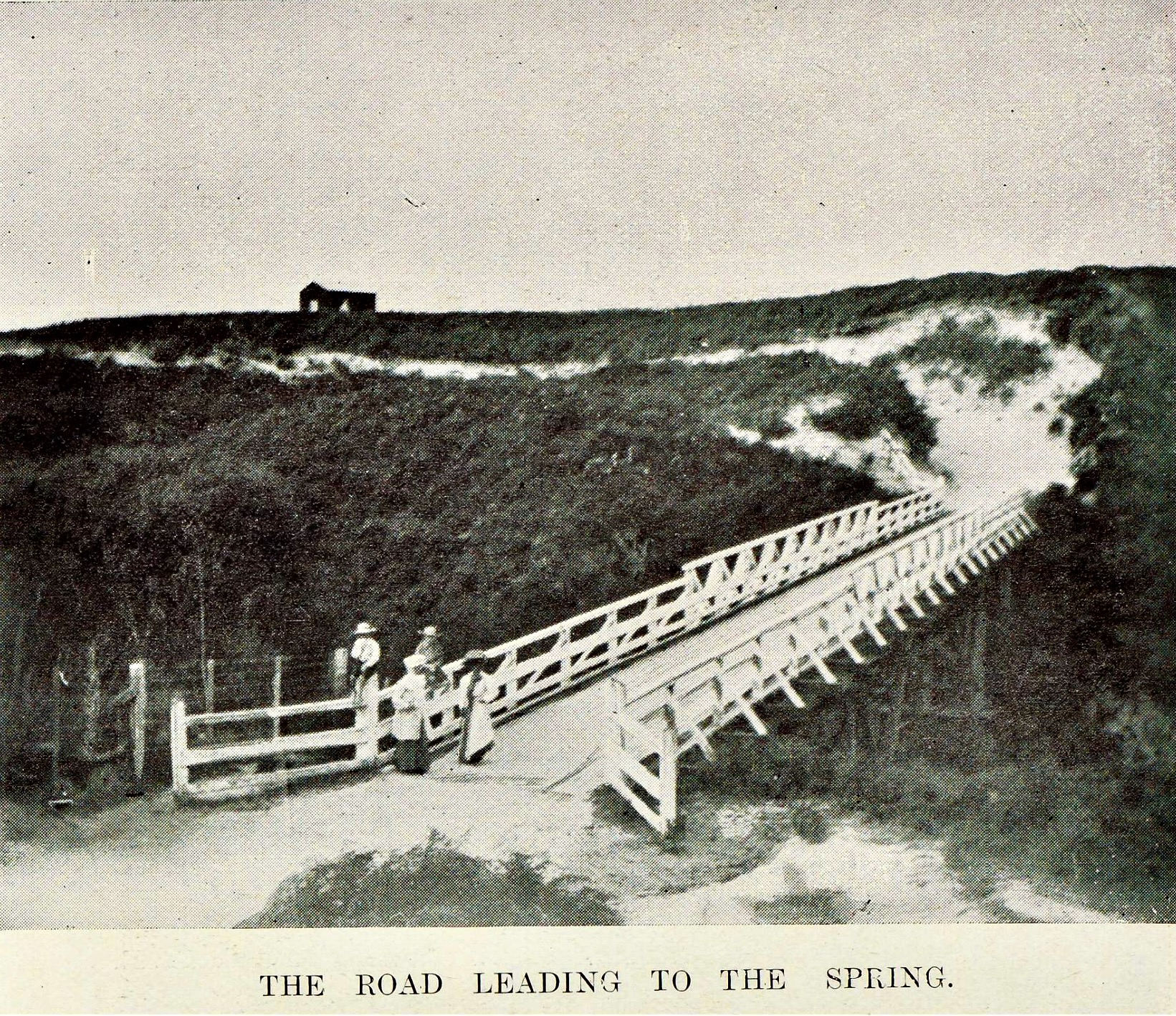
Okauia bridge in 1908

The first bridge across the Waihou River was built for Josiah Firth. It was shortened to 40 ft (12 m) in 1913, repaired in 1929 and replaced in 1956. Te Aroha Road was extended south to Okauia in 1915. Shingle for roads was taken from the river in the 1920s. The road from Matamata was gravelled in 1924. It was sealed in 1931. A bus from Matamata to the springs began in 1923 and was still running in 1938.

Obstructions were removed from the river, so that by 1923 a 30 ft (9.1 m) launch could reach Okauia. The river below Okauia isn't blocked by willow trees, but is now little used.

== Demographics ==
Okauia settlement and its surrounds cover 54.48 km^{2} (21.03 sq mi). It is part of the larger Okauia statistical area.

Historical population for Okauia and surrounds
Year	Pop.	±% p.a.
2006	255	—
2013	312	+2.92%
2018	306	−0.39%
2023	342	+2.25%

Okauia had a population of 342 in the 2023 New Zealand census, an increase of 36 people (11.8%) since the 2018 census, and an increase of 30 people (9.6%) since the 2013 census. There were 192 males, 147 females and 3 people of other genders in 114 dwellings. 0.9% of people identified as LGBTIQ+. There were 78 people (22.8%) aged under 15 years, 54 (15.8%) aged 15 to 29, 159 (46.5%) aged 30 to 64, and 48 (14.0%) aged 65 or older.

People could identify as more than one ethnicity. The results were 82.5% European (Pākehā); 28.1% Māori; 6.1% Pasifika; 5.3% Asian; 0.9% Middle Eastern, Latin American and African New Zealanders (MELAA); and 3.5% other, which includes people giving their ethnicity as "New Zealander". English was spoken by 96.5%, Māori language by 8.8%, Samoan by 0.9%, and other languages by 2.6%. No language could be spoken by 2.6% (e.g. too young to talk). New Zealand Sign Language was known by 0.9%. The percentage of people born overseas was 14.0, compared with 28.8% nationally.

Religious affiliations were 33.3% Christian, 2.6% Māori religious beliefs, and 0.9% New Age. People who answered that they had no religion were 49.1%, and 14.9% of people did not answer the census question.

Of those at least 15 years old, 36 (13.6%) people had a bachelor's or higher degree, 171 (64.8%) had a post-high school certificate or diploma, and 66 (25.0%) people exclusively held high school qualifications. 24 people (9.1%) earned over $100,000 compared to 12.1% nationally. The employment status of those at least 15 was that 132 (50.0%) people were employed full-time, 54 (20.5%) were part-time, and 6 (2.3%) were unemployed.

=== Okauia statistical area ===
Okauia statistical area covers 119.50 km^{2} (46.14 sq mi) and had an estimated population of 1,120 as of June 2025, with a population density of 9.4 people per km^{2}.

Historical population for the statistical area
Year	Pop.	±% p.a.
2006	891	—
2013	972	+1.25%
2018	1,038	+1.32%
2023	1,092	+1.02%
The 2006 population is for a larger area of 120.03 km^{2}. Source:

Okauia had a population of 1,092 in the 2023 New Zealand census, an increase of 54 people (5.2%) since the 2018 census, and an increase of 120 people (12.3%) since the 2013 census. There were 567 males, 522 females and 6 people of other genders in 387 dwellings. 1.1% of people identified as LGBTIQ+. The median age was 36.5 years (compared with 38.1 years nationally). There were 249 people (22.8%) aged under 15 years, 198 (18.1%) aged 15 to 29, 495 (45.3%) aged 30 to 64, and 147 (13.5%) aged 65 or older.

People could identify as more than one ethnicity. The results were 88.7% European (Pākehā); 16.2% Māori; 2.5% Pasifika; 4.4% Asian; 0.8% Middle Eastern, Latin American and African New Zealanders (MELAA); and 1.6% other, which includes people giving their ethnicity as "New Zealander". English was spoken by 97.3%, Māori language by 3.8%, Samoan by 0.3%, and other languages by 6.6%. No language could be spoken by 2.2% (e.g. too young to talk). New Zealand Sign Language was known by 0.3%. The percentage of people born overseas was 15.7, compared with 28.8% nationally.

Religious affiliations were 33.8% Christian, 0.3% Hindu, 0.5% Islam, 1.4% Māori religious beliefs, 0.3% Buddhist, 0.3% New Age, and 0.3% other religions. People who answered that they had no religion were 53.8%, and 9.3% of people did not answer the census question.

Of those at least 15 years old, 117 (13.9%) people had a bachelor's or higher degree, 507 (60.1%) had a post-high school certificate or diploma, and 216 (25.6%) people exclusively held high school qualifications. The median income was $44,700, compared with $41,500 nationally. 99 people (11.7%) earned over $100,000 compared to 12.1% nationally. The employment status of those at least 15 was that 468 (55.5%) people were employed full-time, 159 (18.9%) were part-time, and 12 (1.4%) were unemployed.

== Hot springs ==
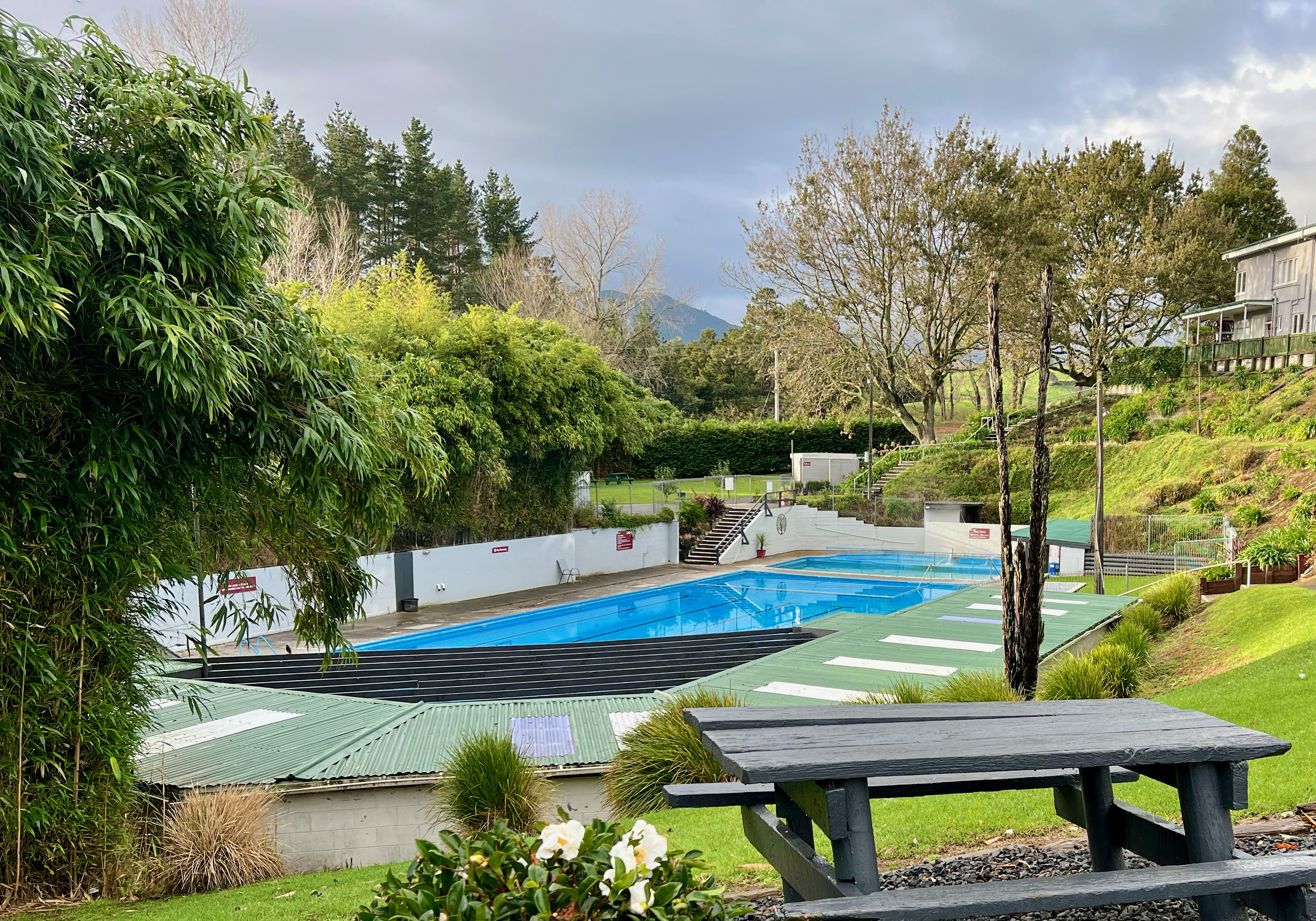
Opal Hot Springs in 2023

Okauia Springs were part of the geothermal taonga of Ngāti Hinerangi, but by 1880 Okauia No.5 block, containing the Ramaroa spring, was sold into private ownership, with a verbal agreement between the owner and the iwi that they could continue to use it. However, by 1920 the block had been sold to a new owner, and despite protest to the Crown, Ngāti Hinerangi had to pay to use the spring. Access to other hot springs ended in a similar way. A deed of settlement between Ngāti Hinerangi and the Crown, redressing some of the unjust Crown actions, was signed on 4 May 2019.

J. C. Firth opened Opal (Okauia) and Crystal (Papahuia) springs. The original pool, Ramaroa, was named after a canoe, turned to a stone in the pool. An alternative explanation of the name Rama Roa, is “Long Light,” as the sun sometimes causes it to shimmer with light. Opal was named for its clear, pale-blue water and Crystal for its small, diamond-like crystals. At Opal, after the bridge was built overlooking the pool, changing rooms, concrete steps and a wall between Opal and the river, were added. Accommodation was built in 1923. In 1925 Opal was doubled in length to 61 ft (19 m) x 25 ft (7.6 m), lined with concrete and extra changing rooms added. A sample at Okauia in 1994 measured a temperature of 39 °C (102 °F) and a higher level of bicarbonate than most springs.

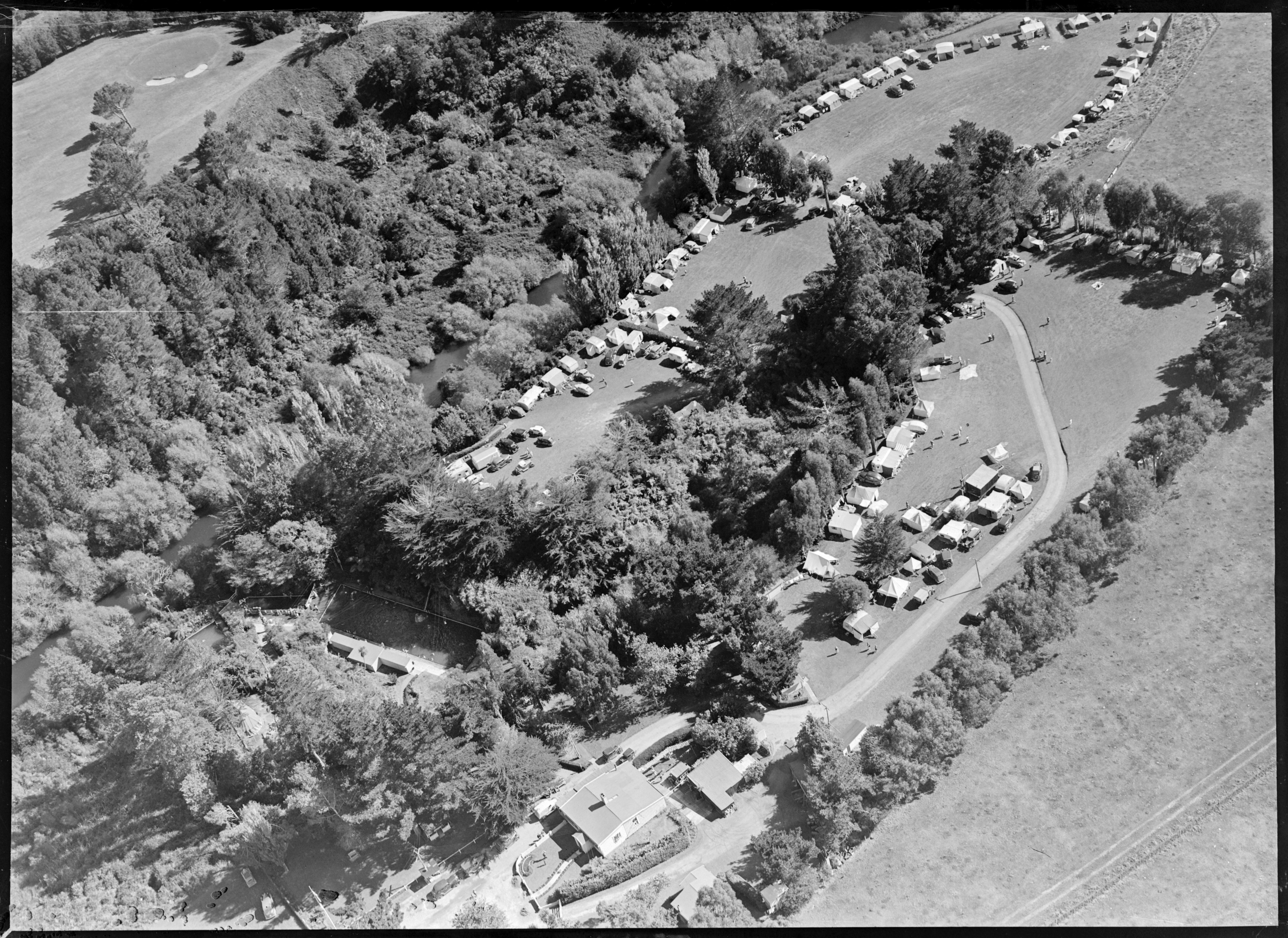
Crystal Hot Springs in 1949

William Owen Garland developed Crystal Springs from 1916. The river was dammed and a rectangular pool dug out. Crystal was concreted and extended in 1929, when a report said 80,000 imp gal (360,000 L) filled the pool in 2h 45m, equivalent to about 485 imp gal (2.20 m^{3}) per minute. In 1959 the flow was reported as about 100 imp gal (0.45 m^{3})/min higher. In 1968 4 cases of meningitis were contracted after swimming at Crystal Springs, so the public pool was closed, as it was after other cases in 1971 and 1978. The pools were rebuilt and opened for bathing of horses and greyhounds. Crystal Springs are now used by Youth With A Mission.

== See also ==
- List of towns in New Zealand
