= Manganui River =

Manganui River may refer to the following New Zealand rivers:

- Manganui River (Northland)
- Manganui River (Waikato)
- Manganui River (Taranaki)
- Manganui o te Ao River

== See also ==
- Manganui
- Mangaone River (disambiguation)
- Mangapapa River (disambiguation)
