= Mangakarengorengo River =

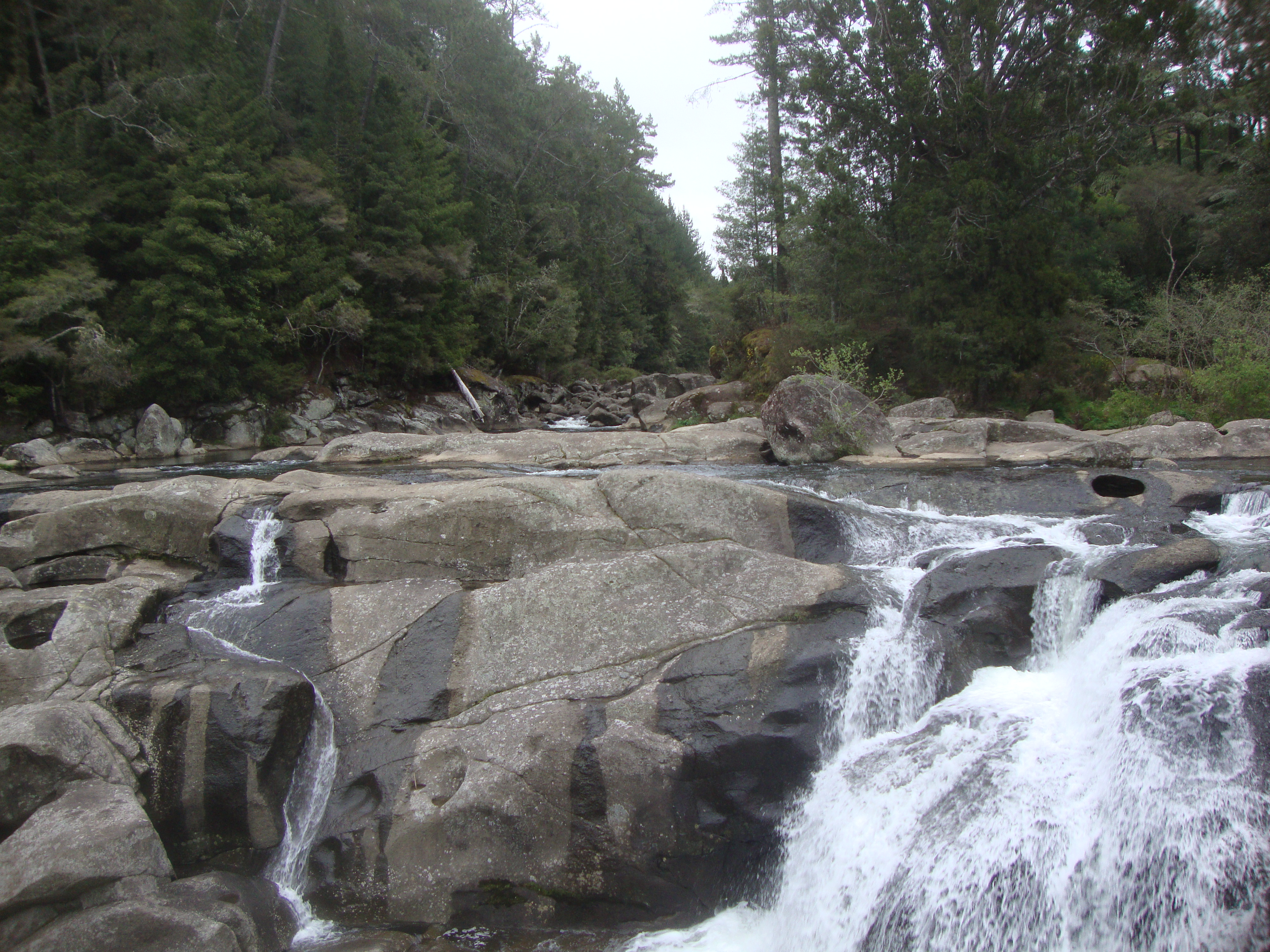
- Mangakarengorengo River at McLaren Falls, at the confluence with the Opuiaki River
- Route of the Mangakarengorengo River
- Mouth of the Mangakarengorengo River Mangakarengorengo River (North Island)

Location
- Country: New Zealand

Physical characteristics
- Source: Confluence of Ngāumuwahine River and Mangahuruhuru Stream
  - coordinates: 37°49′06″S 176°01′02″E
- Mouth
  - location: Opuiaki River
  - coordinates: 37°48′21″S 176°02′41″E
- Length: 25 km (16 mi)

Basin features
- Progression: Mangakarengorengo River → Opuiaki River → Wairoa River → Tauranga Harbour → Bay of Plenty → Pacific Ocean
- Tributaries
  - left: Mangakaiwhiria Stream

The Mangakarengorengo River is a river of the Bay of Plenty Region of New Zealand. It is a tributary of the Opuiaki River.

== See also ==
- List of rivers of New Zealand
