= Mamaku Ranges =

Range of rugged hills in the North Island of New Zealand

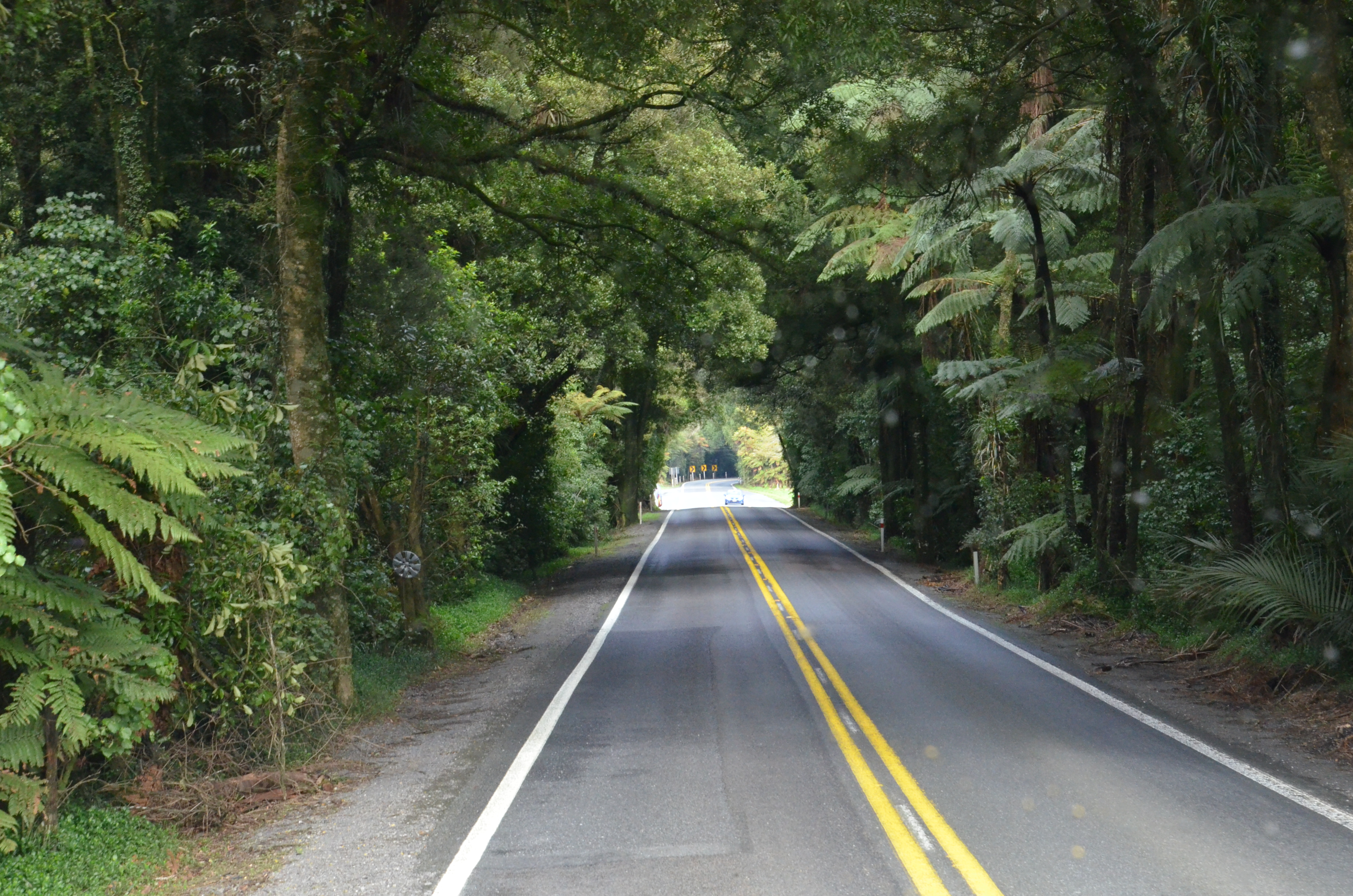
- The Fitzgerald Glade on SH 5 is in the western Mamaku Ranges and is usually noted by tourists who pass through as like a forest tunnel

Highest point
- Elevation: 696 m (2,283 ft)
- Coordinates: 38°10′32″S 175°58′35″E

Geography
- Approximate extent of Mamaku Ranges

Geology
- Rock age(s): Mainly about 240 thousand years ago but some formations to south west over a million years ago and in southern valleys adjacent to the ranges as recent as 232 CE.
- Mountain type: Mostly rhyolitic formations
- Rock type: Predominantly rhyolite volcanics
- Volcanic belt: Taupō Volcanic Zone

Climbing
- Easiest route: SH 1 (but only briefly)
- Normal route: SH 5 (classic scenic route through the middle) or State Highway 29 (New Zealand) (southern side of road)
- Access: As well as above there are multiple roads in the ignimbrite plateau region. Many of these however are private access to commercial forest. Access to much of the northern part of the range covered in native forest between SH 29 and SH 5 is often hard due to absence of formal tracks except access to the Rapurapu Kauri Track (off SH 29) and Te Rereiotura Falls (accessed from Ngatuhoa Lodge area off Frankham Road which is off Canal or Mangaaonui Roads which are off the Mclaren Falls Road off SH 29)

The Mamaku Ranges are a mountain range in the North Island of New Zealand. Located to the west of Lake Rotorua and north of Lake Taupō, they lie to the immediate south of the Kaimai Range and can be thought of as an extension of it, in much the same way that the Kaimai Range can be considered an extension of the Coromandel Range. The hills terminate in the south with the valley of the Waikato River. There were at one time numerous bush railways that ran over and through the Ranges. One disused line has been developed for tourism.

At their highest, the Mamaku Ranges rise to over 600 metres (2,000 ft), and much of the high ground within the hills forms a plateau. The range is extensively forested, with the Kaimai-Mamaku State Forest and Kinleith Forest both covering a considerable part of them. The forest includes kauri trees growing at the far southern limit of their natural range. Some kauri can be accessed via the Rapurapu Kauri Track.

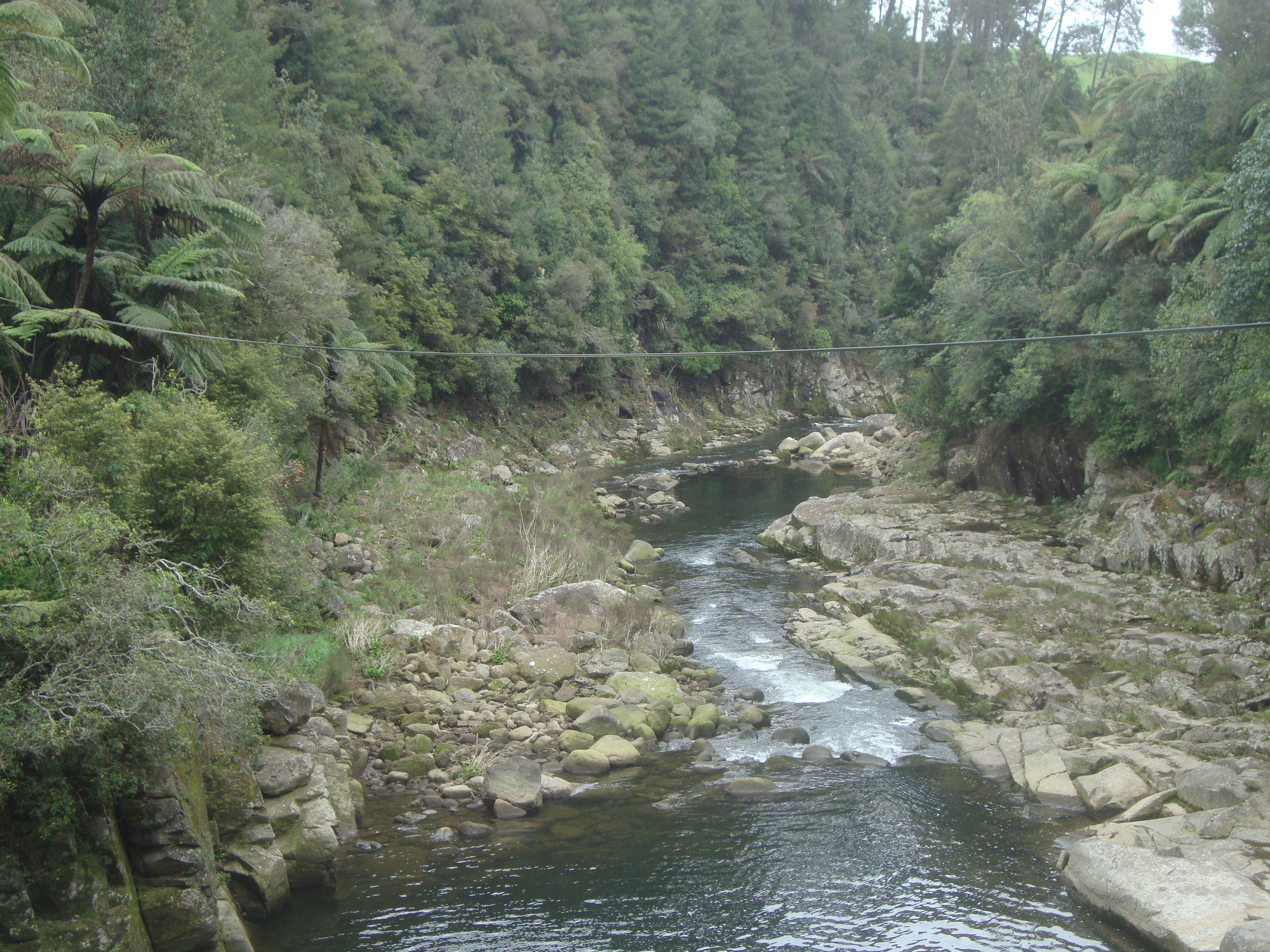
Wairoa River near McLaren Falls drains the northern Mamaku Ranges

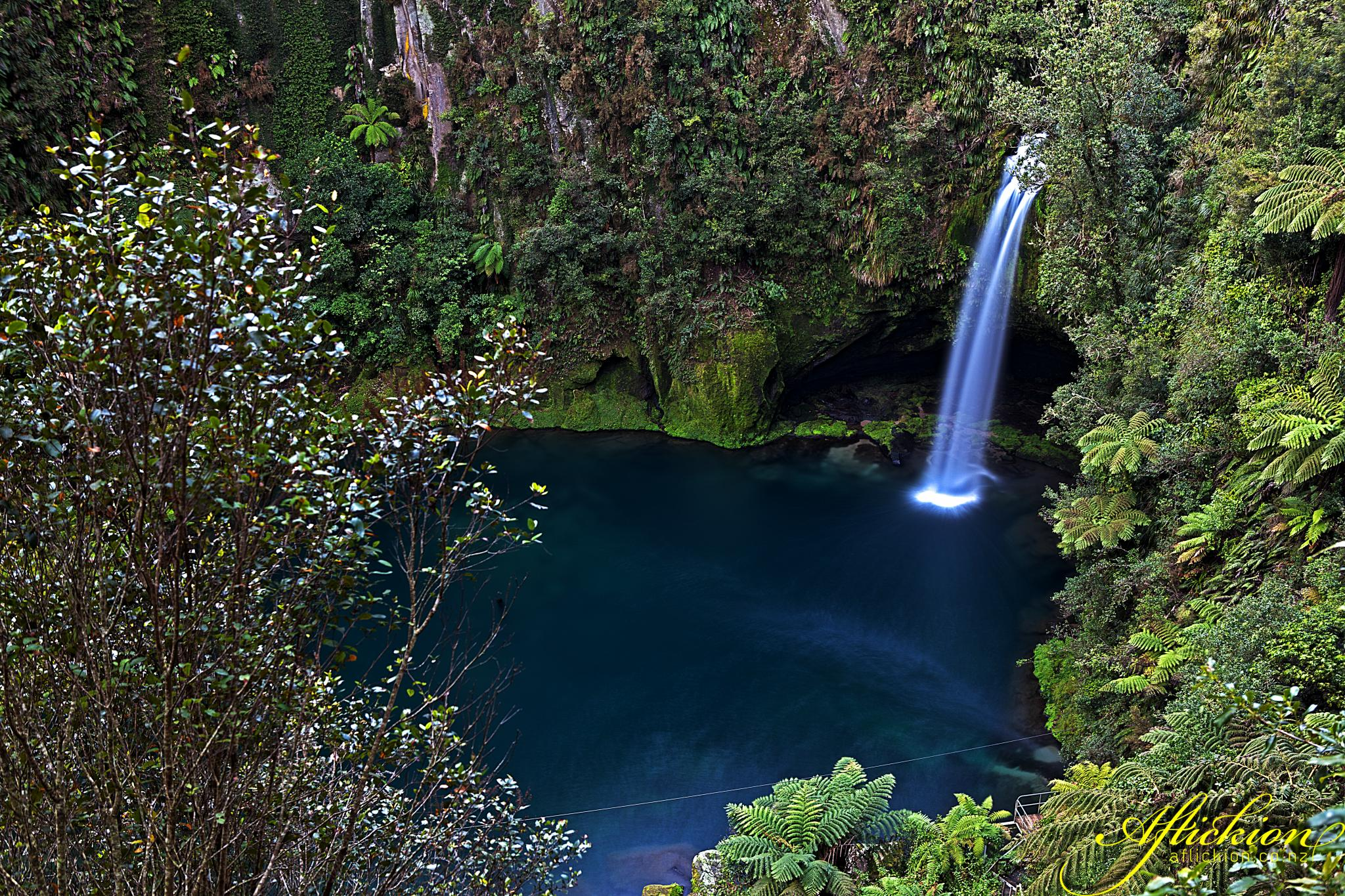
The Omanawa Falls are on the north eastern border of the Mamaku Ranges

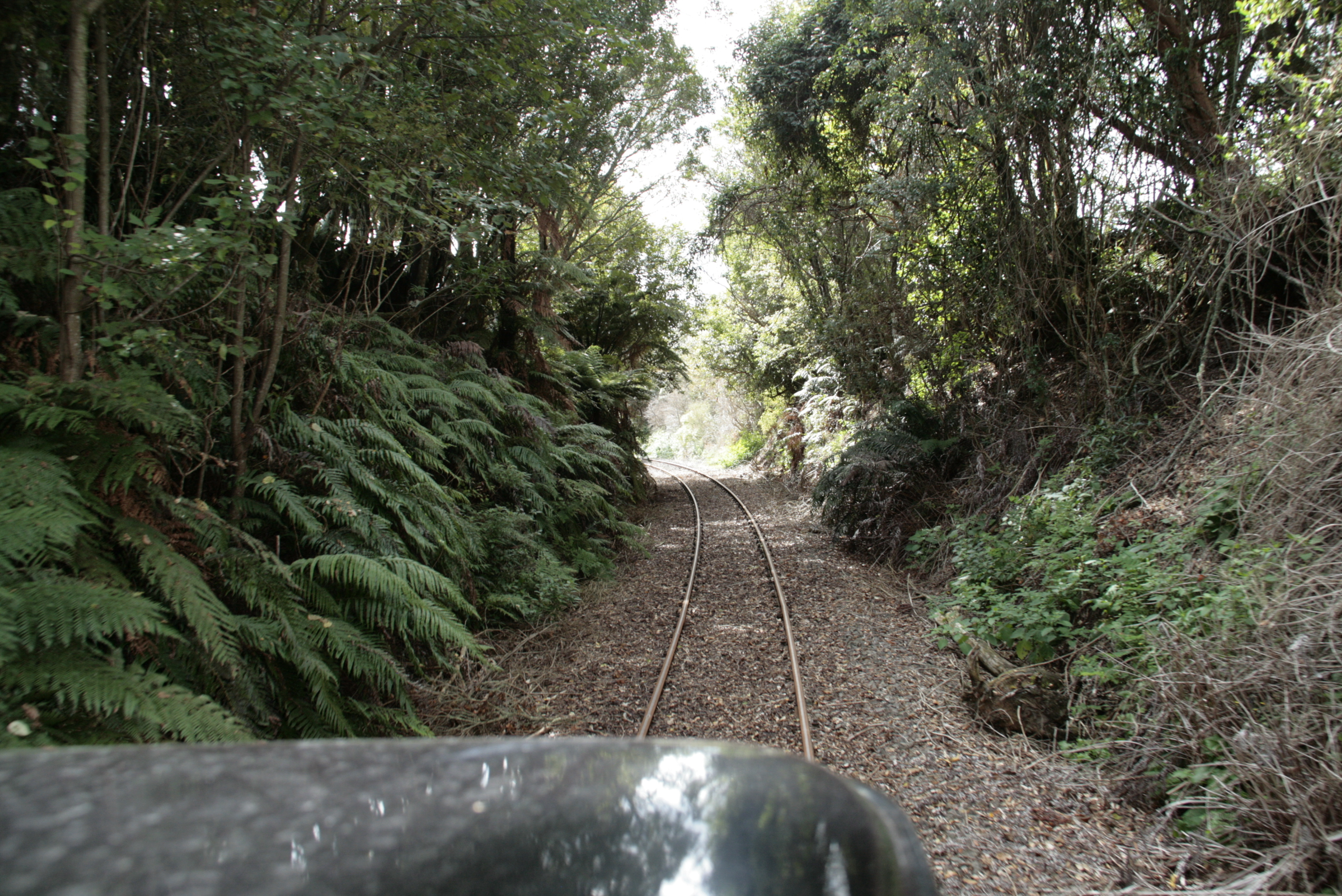
View near Mamaku of more accessible eastern portion of ranges with a former disused railway line used as a tourist activity.

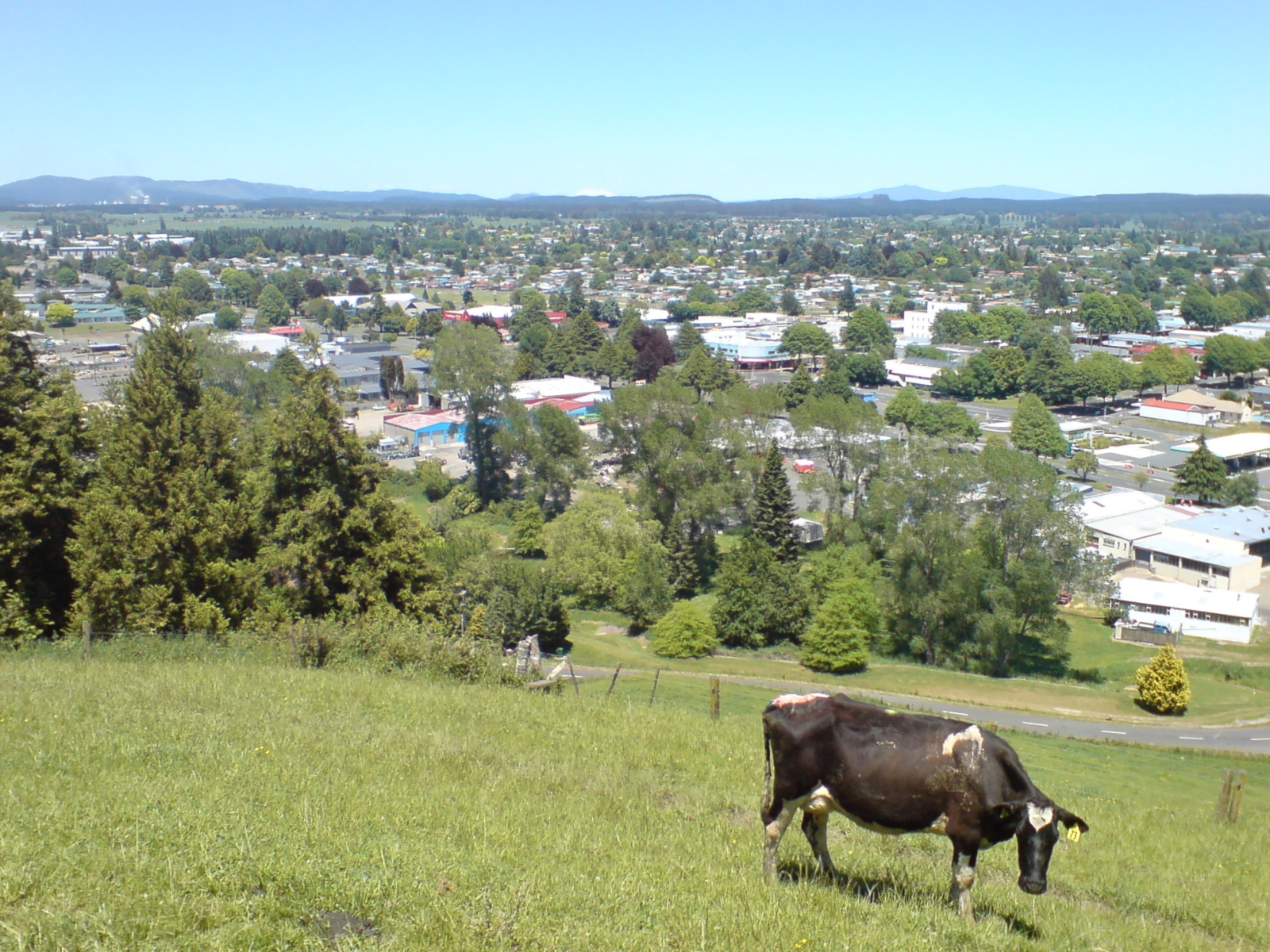
View to south from Tokoroa scenic lookout that includes in the distance to the left of the picture much of the south western Mamaku Ranges
