= Wairoa River (Bay of Plenty) =

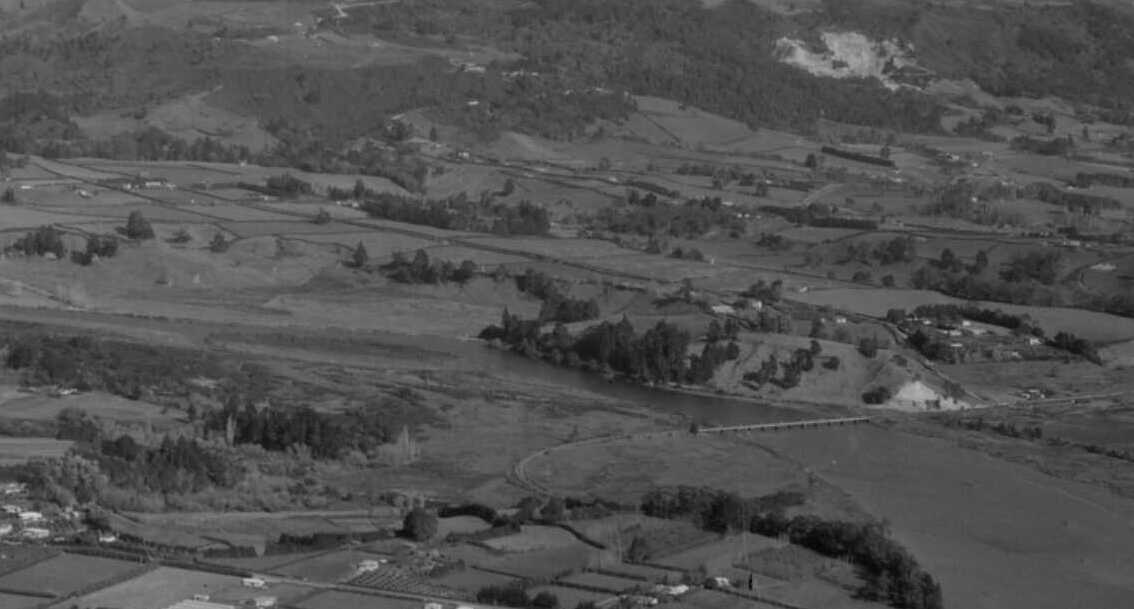
- Aerial view of the mouth of the Wairoa River entering Tauranga Harbour, 1965
- Route of the Wairoa River
- Mouth of the Wairoa River Wairoa River (Bay of Plenty) (North Island)

Location
- Country: New Zealand

Physical characteristics
- Source: Opuiaki River
  - coordinates: 37°46′58″S 176°03′07″E
- Mouth
  - location: Tauranga Harbour
  - coordinates: 37°41′11″S 176°05′39″E
  - elevation: 0 m (0 ft)
- Length: 14 km (8.7 mi)

Basin features
- Progression: Opuiaki River → Wairoa River → Tauranga Harbour → Bay of Plenty → Pacific Ocean
- Tributaries
  - left: Ngutukakariki Stream, Mangatarata Stream, Mangarata Stream, Waireia Stream, Raratonga Stream, Ruangārara Stream
  - right: Omanawa River
- Bridges: Ruahihi Bridge, Wairoa River Bridge

The Wairoa River runs north into Tauranga Harbour at the western end of the Bay of Plenty in New Zealand's North Island.

== Hydroelectric power ==
In the mid-1970s, the Tauranga Joint Generation Committee proposed a hydroelectric power scheme for the Opuiaki River and Wairoa River. The newly formed Kaimai Canoe Club (established by Barry Anderson, Bill Ross, Kerry Smith and Peter Entwistle) opposed the scheme at the water rights hearings, this was on the grounds that it would destroy fishing, sport and recreation for existing and future generations. A compromise was arrived at by allowing the release of water 26 days a year for whitewater recreation. The last dam diverts water around the river bed to the Ruahihi Power Station.

TrustPower is now the manager of the power scheme on the river.

== See also ==
- Rivers of New Zealand
- Kaituna River
